= Pimelea pendens =

Scientific classification
- Kingdom: Plantae
- Clade: Tracheophytes
- Clade: Angiosperms
- Clade: Eudicots
- Clade: Rosids
- Order: Malvales
- Family: Thymelaeaceae
- Genus: Pimelea
- Species: P. pendens

Binomial name
- Pimelea pendens Rye

Species of flowering plant

Pimelea pendens is a species of flowering plant in the family Thymelaeaceae and is endemic to the southwest of Western Australia. It is an erect, spindly shrub with egg-shaped to narrowly elliptic leaves and compact, pendulous clusters of pale green flowers surrounded by 2 to 4 pairs of green or yellowish-green involucral bracts.

== Description ==
Pimelea pendens is an erect, spindly shrub that typically grows to a height of 0.1–1 m (3.9 in – 3 ft 3.4 in) and has a single stem at the base. The leaves are arranged in opposite pairs, glabrous, egg-shaped to narrowly elliptic, 6–18 mm (0.24–0.71 in) long, 3–8 mm (0.12–0.31 in) wide and sessile. The flowers are arranged in compact, pendulous clusters on a peduncle 1–5 mm (0.039–0.197 in) long. The clusters are surrounded by 2 to 4 pairs of green or yellowish-green involucral bracts 14–25 mm (0.55–0.98 in) long, each flower on a hairy pedicel up to 2 mm (0.079 in) long. The flower tube is 9–14 mm (0.35–0.55 in) long and the sepals narrowly egg-shaped to egg-shaped and 3.5–4.5 mm (0.14–0.18 in) long. The stamens are slightly longer than the sepals and the style extends 3–5 mm (0.12–0.20 in) beyond the end of the flower tube. Flowering occurs from May to August.

== Taxonomy ==
Pimelea pendens was first formally described in 1988 by Barbara Lynette Rye and the description was published in the journal Nuytsia from specimens collected east of Esperance in 1983. The specific epithet (pendens) means "hanging down", referring to the flower clusters.

== Distribution and habitat ==
This pimelea grows on scree slopes and on road verges near woodlands along the coast of southern Western Australia between Frenchman Peak in Cape Le Grand National Park and Mount Arid in Cape Arid National Park, and as far inland as Mount Ney north of Esperance, in the Esperance Plains and Mallee bioregions of south-western Western Australia.

== Conservation status ==
Pimelea pendens is listed as "not threatened" by the Western Australian Government Department of Biodiversity, Conservation and Attractions.
