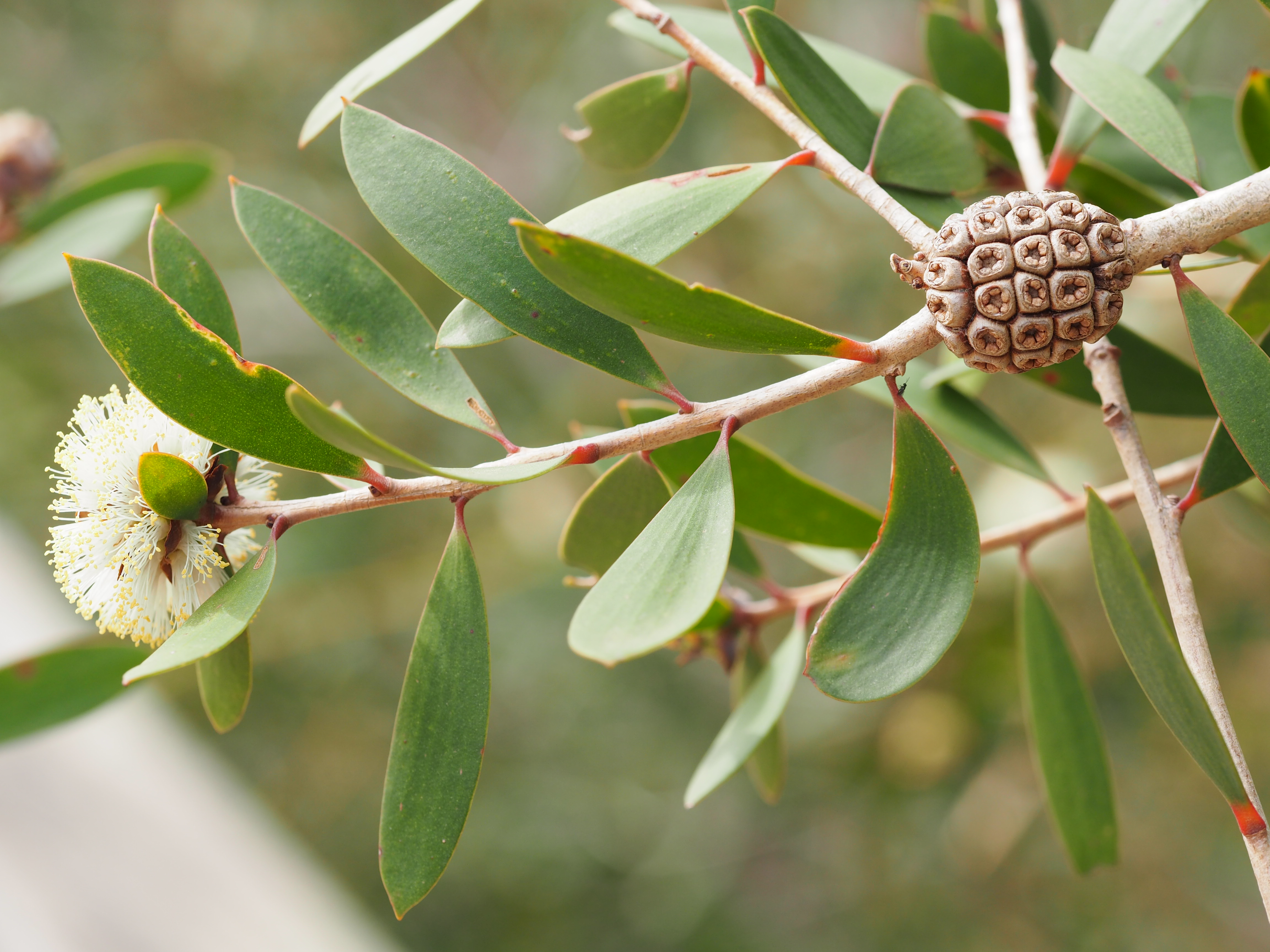

Conservation status
- Least Concern (IUCN 3.1)

Scientific classification
- Kingdom: Plantae
- Clade: Tracheophytes
- Clade: Angiosperms
- Clade: Eudicots
- Clade: Rosids
- Order: Myrtales
- Family: Myrtaceae
- Genus: Melaleuca
- Species: M. globifera

Binomial name
- Melaleuca globifera R.Br.

Synonyms
- Myrtoleucodendron globiferum (R.Br.) Kuntze

= Melaleuca globifera =

Species of shrub

Melaleuca globifera is a shrub in the myrtle family, Myrtaceae and is endemic to the south-west of Western Australia. It is a bushy, small tree with papery bark and spherical heads of flowers on the ends of the branches.

== Description ==
Melaleuca globifera grows to a height of about 10 m (30 ft) and has light brown, papery bark. Its leaves are arranged alternately, 26–66 mm (1–3 in) long and 7.0–20.5 mm (0.3–0.8 in), flat, oblong, thick, usually a slightly pointed end and with 5 to 7 parallel veins.

The flowers are in heads at the ends of branches that continue to grow after flowering (and sometimes in the upper leaf axils). Each head has between 12 and 20 groups of flowers in threes 30–35 mm (1.2–1.4 in) in diameter. The petals are 1.7–2.5 mm (0.07–0.1 in) long and fall off as the flower ages. The stamens are white to creamy yellow, arranged in 5 bundles around the flower, each bundle containing 7 to 10 stamens. Flowering occurs from June to September and is followed by the fruit which are woody capsules in globular clusters with a diameter of 20 mm (0.8 in).

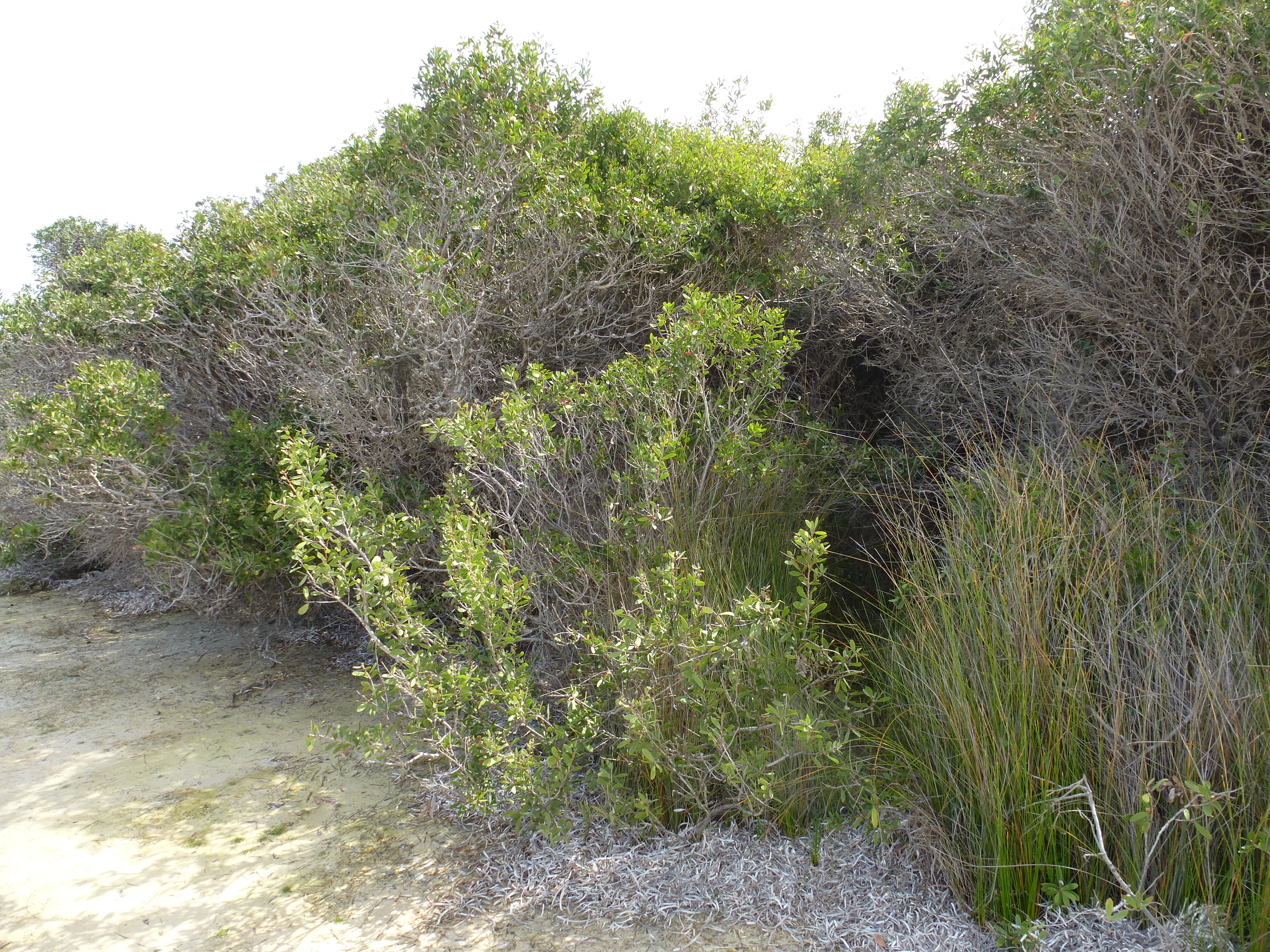
Habit at Lucky Bay in the Cape Le Grand National Park

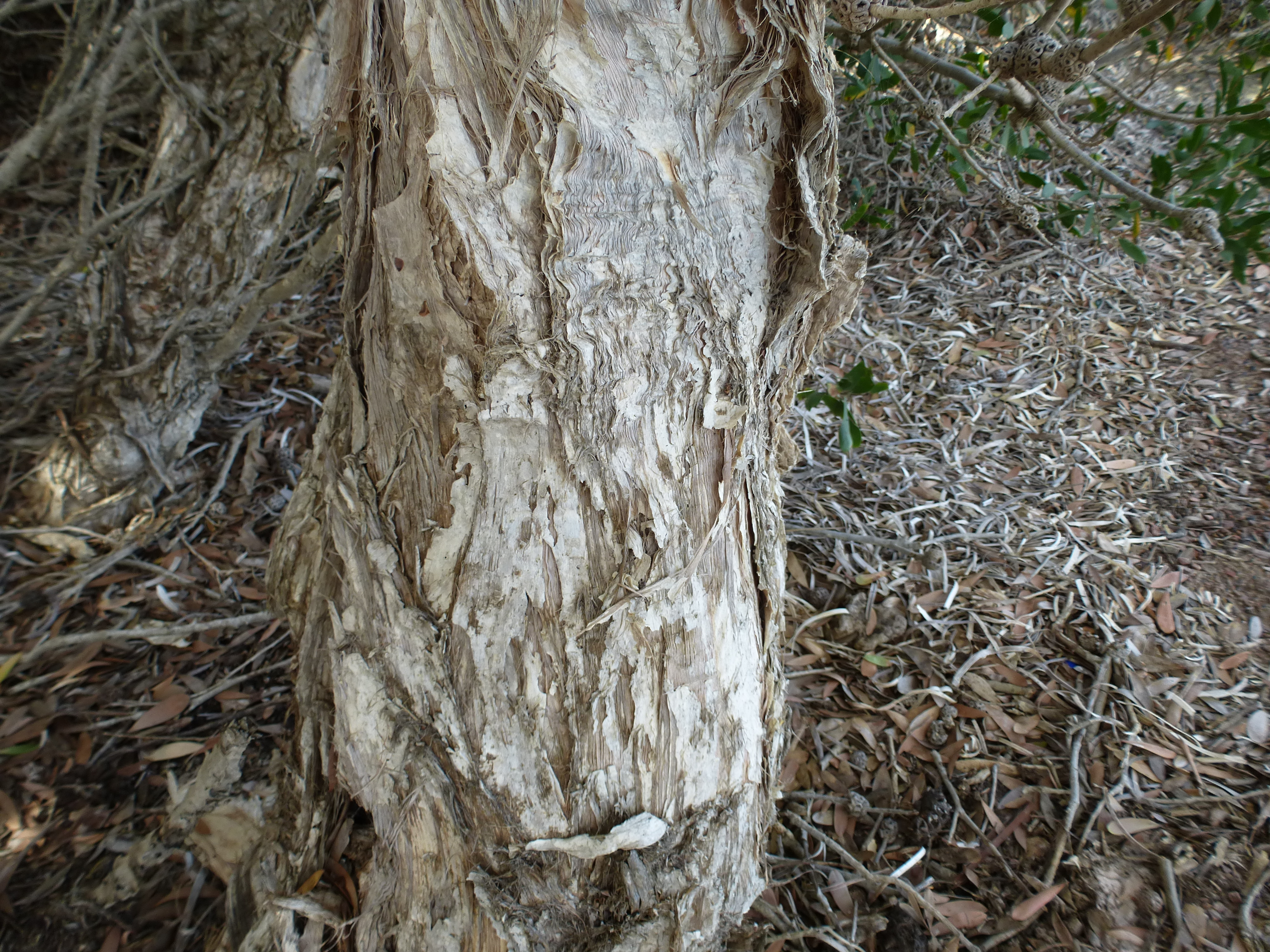
Bark

== Taxonomy and naming ==
This species was first formally described in 1812 by Robert Brown in the Hortus Kewensis of William Aiton. The specific epithet (globifera) is from the Latin globus and -fer meaning "carrying", referring to the spherical fruiting clusters of this species.

== Distribution and habitat ==
Melaleuca globifera occurs on the coast near Esperance including the Cape le Grand and Cape Arid national parks, and on the nearby islands of the Recherche Archipelago in the Esperance Plains biogeographic region. It grows on white or grey sand, on granite outcrops and near salt lakes.

== Conservation status ==
This melaleuca is listed as not threatened by the Government of Western Australia Department of Parks and Wildlife.
