= Acacia incanicarpa =

Conservation status
- Priority Two — Poorly Known Taxa (DEC)

Scientific classification
- Kingdom: Plantae
- Clade: Embryophytes
- Clade: Tracheophytes
- Clade: Spermatophytes
- Clade: Angiosperms
- Clade: Eudicots
- Clade: Rosids
- Order: Fabales
- Family: Fabaceae
- Subfamily: Caesalpinioideae
- Clade: Mimosoid clade
- Genus: Acacia
- Species: A. incanicarpa

Binomial name
- Acacia incanicarpa A.R.Chapman & Maslin
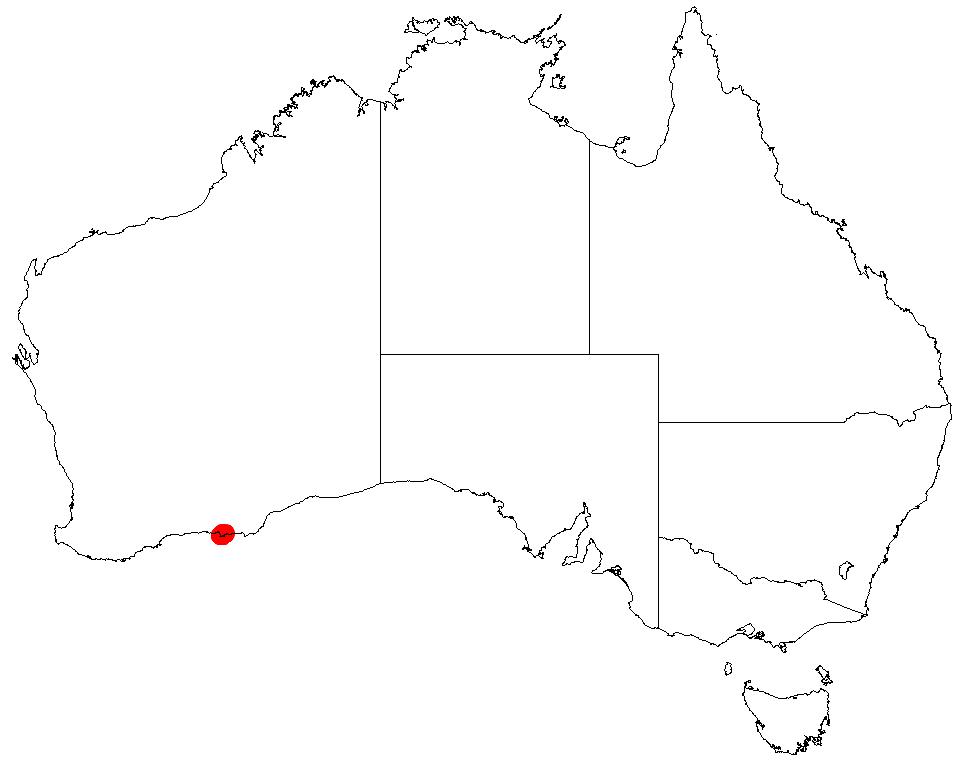
- Occurrence data from AVH

Synonyms
- Acacia aff. tarculensis [P12] (A.S.Weston 7169); Racosperma incanicarpum (A.R.Chapm. & Maslin) Pedley

Species of legume

Acacia incanicarpa is a species of flowering plant in the family Fabaceae and is endemic to the Cape Le Grand National Park in the south of Western Australia. It is a bushy, rounded or inverted cone-shaped shrub with leathery, lance-shaped to narrowly oblong or elliptic phyllodes, spherical heads of light golden yellow flowers, and linear, crusty hoary pods.

== Description ==
Acacia incanicarpa is a bushy, rounded or inverted cone-shaped shrub that typically grows to a height of 1–2 m (3 ft 3 in – 6 ft 7 in) and has ribbed, hoary, often scaly branchlets. Its phyllodes are leathery, lance-shaped with the narrower end towards the base, narrowly oblong or elliptic, 40–90 mm (1.6–3.5 in) long and 7–14 mm (0.28–0.55 in) wide and silvery grey-green, with one or three main veins and many finer closely parallel veins in between. The flowers are borne in an oblong to short cylindrical head 7–10 mm (0.28–0.39 in) long and 4–5 mm (0.16–0.20 in) in diameter in axils, on a peduncle 2–3 mm (0.079–0.118 in) long. The peduncles are covered with silky hairs, but often obscured by resin. Flowering has been recorded in November to December and in January and April, and the pods are linear, straight, firmly crust-like, up to 100 mm (3.9 in) long and 4–5 mm (0.16–0.20 in) wide. The seeds are oblong to elliptic, 3–5 mm (0.12–0.20 in) long, semi-glossy dark brown with white aril on the end.

== Taxonomy ==
Acacia incanicarpa was first formally described in 2001 by Alexander Robert Chapman and Bruce Maslin in the journal Nuytsia from specimens collected by Maslin on Frenchmans Peak in the Cape Le Grand National Park in 1983. The specific epithet (incanicarpa) mean 'grey-' or 'hoary-fruited'.

== Distribution ==
This species of wattle is restricted to the Cape Le Grand National Park east of Esperance where it grows in pockets of loamy sand on granite ridges and slopes in open scrub or heathland and low shrubland communities.

== Conservation status ==
Acacia incanicarpa is listed as 'Priority Two', meaning that it is poorly known and from only one or a few locations.

== See also ==
- List of Acacia species
