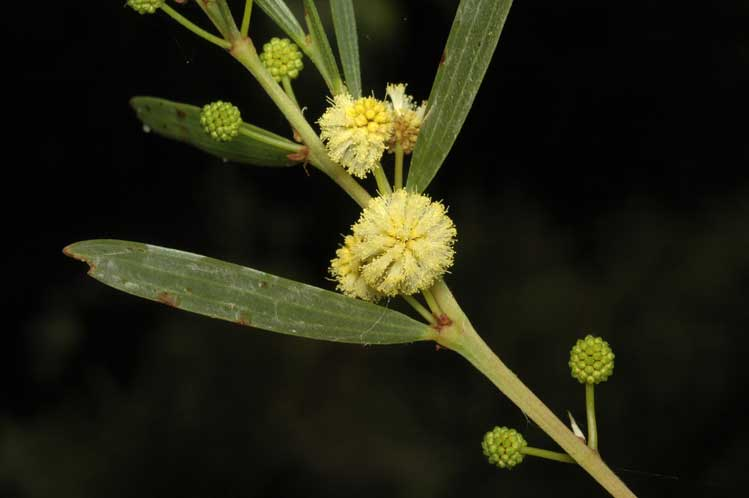
- In the Australian National Botanic Gardens

Scientific classification
- Kingdom: Plantae
- Clade: Tracheophytes
- Clade: Angiosperms
- Clade: Eudicots
- Clade: Rosids
- Order: Fabales
- Family: Fabaceae
- Subfamily: Caesalpinioideae
- Clade: Mimosoid clade
- Genus: Acacia
- Species: A. heteroclita

Binomial name
- Acacia heteroclita Meisn.
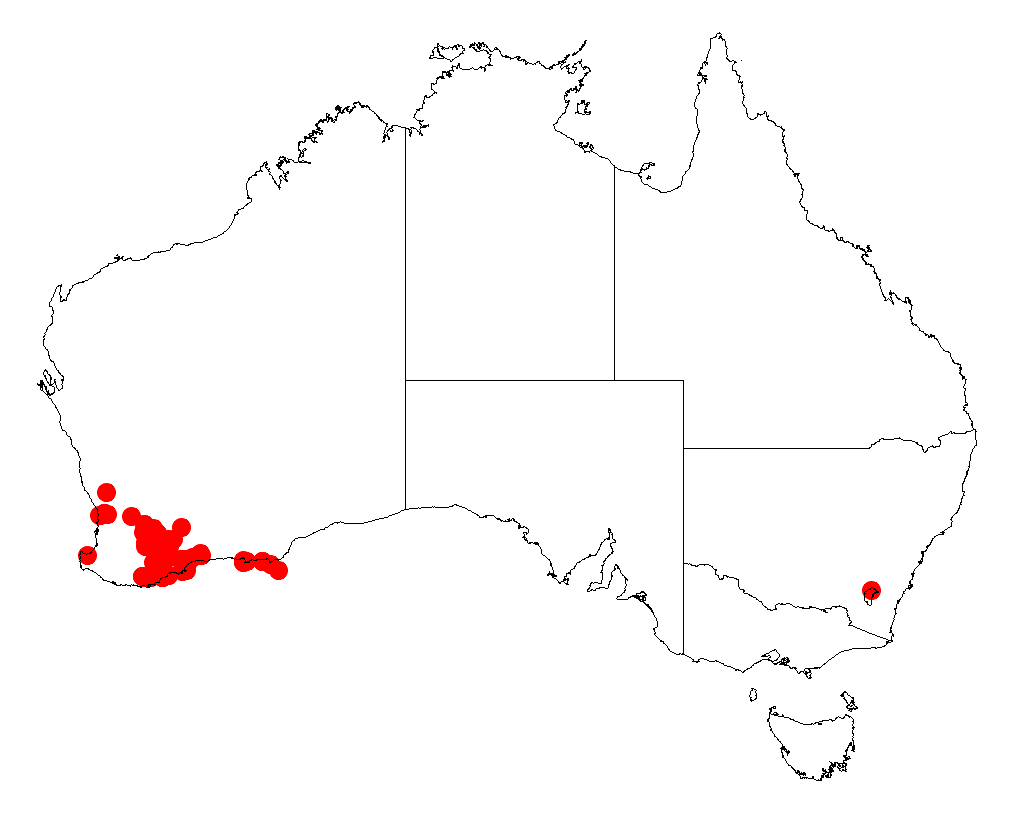
- Occurrence data from AVH

Synonyms
- Acacia trissoneura F.Muell.; Racosperma heteroclitum (Meisn.) Pedley

= Acacia heteroclita =

Species of legume

Acacia heteroclita is a species of flowering plant in the family Fabaceae and is endemic to the south-west of Western Australia. It is an erect, spreading shrub or tree with linear to lance-shaped, more or less curved leathery phyllodes, spherical heads of golden yellow flowers and narrowly oblong to linear, straight pods slightly raised over the seeds.

== Description ==
Acacia heteroclita is an erect, spreading shrub or tree that typically grows to a height of 1–4 m (3 ft 3 in – 13 ft 1 in), its new growth usually covered with silky, yellow hairs. Its phyllodes are spreading to ascending, linear to lance-shaped with the narrower end towards the base, more or less curved, mostly 50–110 mm (2.0–4.3 in) long, 3–9 mm (0.12–0.35 in) wide and leathery, usually with three strongly raised main veins and a gland 1.5–10 mm (0.059–0.394 in) above the pulvinus. The flowers are borne in one or two, more or less spherical heads in axils on peduncles 5–12 mm (0.20–0.47 in) long, each head 4–6 mm (0.16–0.24 in) in diameter with 25 to 60 congested, golden yellow flowers. Flowering occurs from September to December and the pods are narrowly oblong to linear, straight, sometimes wavy, up to 80 mm (3.1 in) long, 2.5–9 mm (0.098–0.354 in) wide and slightly raised over the seeds.The seeds are elliptic, 2.5–6 mm (0.098–0.236 in) long, dull, indistinctly mottled with a small aril.

== Taxonomy ==
Acacia heteroclita was first formally described in 1844 by Carl Meissner in Lehmann's Plantae Preissianae from specimens collected near Cape Riche in 1840. The specific epithet (heteroclita) means 'different slopes', possibly because the phyllodes are sometimes oblique.

In 1999, Richard Cowan and Bruce Maslin describe two subspecies of A. heteroclita and the names are accepted by the Australian Plant Census:

- Acacia heteroclita Meisn subsp. heteroclita has phyllodes mostly 3–4 mm (0.12–0.16 in) wide, pods 2.5–5 mm (0.098–0.197 in) wide and seeds 2.5–3.5 mm (0.098–0.138 in) long with a small areole.
- Acacia heteroclita subsp. valida R.S.Cowan & Maslin has phyllodes 4–9 mm (0.16–0.35 in) wide, pods 7–9 mm (0.28–0.35 in) wide and seeds 5.5–6.0 mm (0.22–0.24 in) long with a large areole.

== Distribution and habitat ==
This species of wattle occurs sporadically from Kulin and south to the Porongurup Range and east to Cape Le Grand National Park and nearby islands in the Avon Wheatbelt, Esperance Plains, Jarrah Forest and Mallee bioregions of south-western Western Australia.

- Subspecies heteroclita grows in shrubland, mallee or heath in sand, sandy loam or clay sand, often in saline areas and near the edge of granite outcrops from Kulin and south to the Fitzgerald River National Park and east to the Cape Le Grand National Park and nearby islands of the Recherche Archipelago.
- Subspecies valida is endemic in the Porongurup Range where it grows in loamy soil on, or near granite.

== See also ==
- List of Acacia species
