= Leucopogon apiculatus =

Conservation status
- Priority Three — Poorly Known Taxa (DEC)

Scientific classification
- Kingdom: Plantae
- Clade: Tracheophytes
- Clade: Angiosperms
- Clade: Eudicots
- Clade: Asterids
- Order: Ericales
- Family: Ericaceae
- Genus: Leucopogon
- Species: L. apiculatus

Binomial name
- Leucopogon apiculatus R.Br.
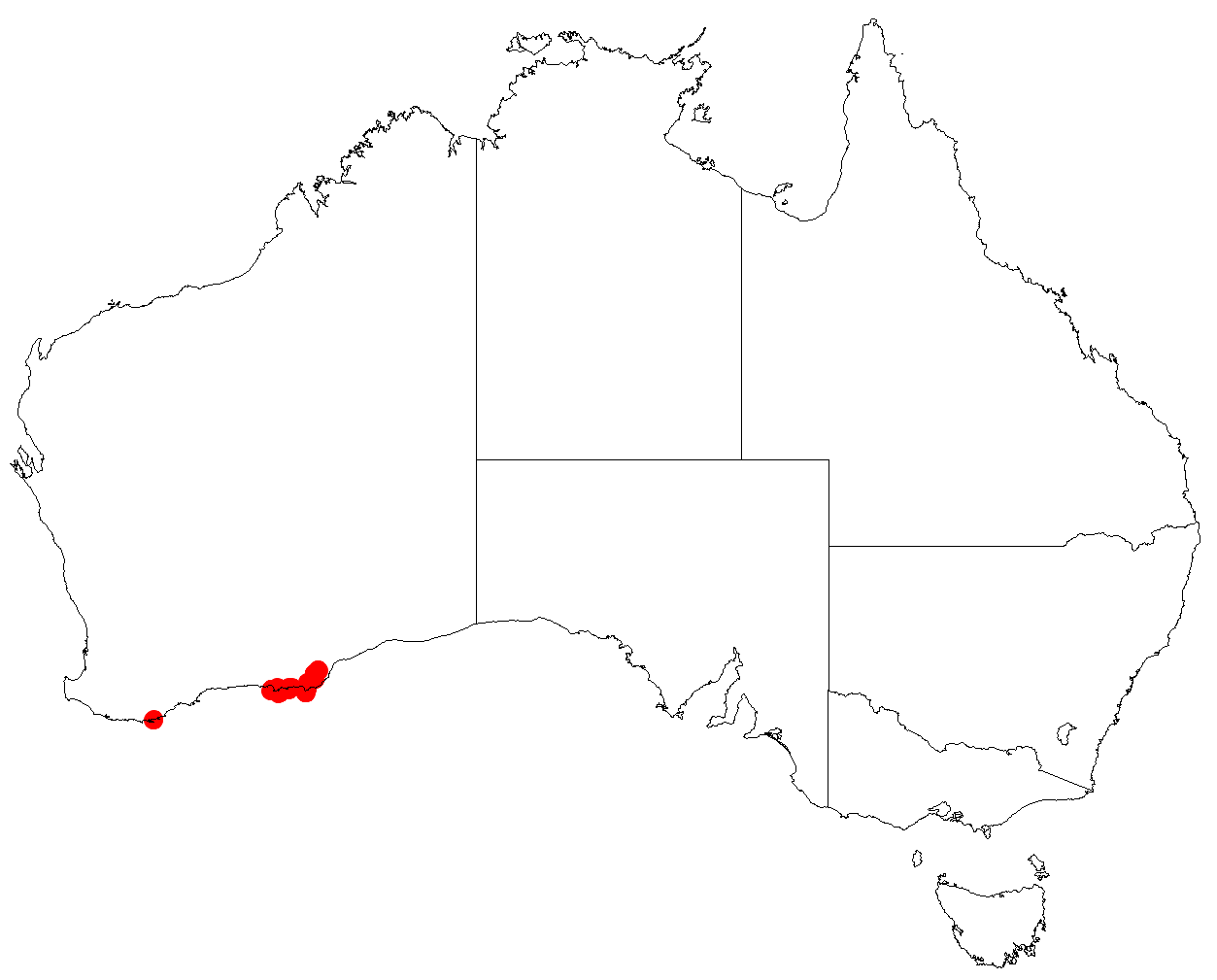
- Occurrence data from AVH

Species of shrub

Leucopogon apiculatus is a species of flowering plant in the family Ericaceae and is endemic to the south of Western Australia. It is an erect shrub with oblong to elliptic leaves and pink to white tube-shaped flowers.

== Description ==
Leucopogon apiculatus is an erect, openly-branched shrub that typically grows to a height of 0.3–2 m (1 ft 0 in – 6 ft 7 in) and has oblong to elliptic leaves 13–19 mm (0.51–0.75 in) long with a sharply-pointed tip. The sepals are about 5.2 mm (0.20 in) long with narrowly lance-shaped bracts at the base, the petals white to pink, the petal tube and the petal lobes about the same length as the sepals. Flowering occurs from July to November.

== Taxonomy ==
Leucopogon apiculatus was first formally described in 1810 by Robert Brown in Prodromus Florae Novae Hollandiae et Insulae Van Diemen. The specific epithet (apiculatus) means "abruptly ending in a small point", referring to the leaves.

== Distribution and habitat ==
This leucopogon grows in sandy or stony soils on granite outcrops, hills and rocky slopes in near-coastal areas of southern Western Australia, from Cape Le Grand National Park in the west to Cape Arid National Park in the east, including on the islands of the Recherche Archipelago, in the Esperance Plains and Mallee bioregions of southern Western Australia.

== Conservation status ==
Leucopogon apiculatus is listed as "Priority Three" by the Government of Western Australia Department of Biodiversity, Conservation and Attractions, meaning that it is poorly known and known from only a few locations but is not under imminent threat.
