= Nine Mile Beach Wind Farm =

Wind farm in Western Australia

Coordinates: 33°53′42″S 121°46′51″E

Nine Mile Beach wind farm was a wind farm generating power for the town of Esperance, Western Australia. The other was Ten Mile Lagoon Wind Farm which was adjacent. The farm generated 9.5 gigawatt-hours (34 TJ) of electricity per annum.

Nine Mile Beach wind farm was commissioned in 2003. The Nine Mile Beach wind farm began decommissioning in 2022. This followed several years of inactivity, and repowering of the site was not an option.
