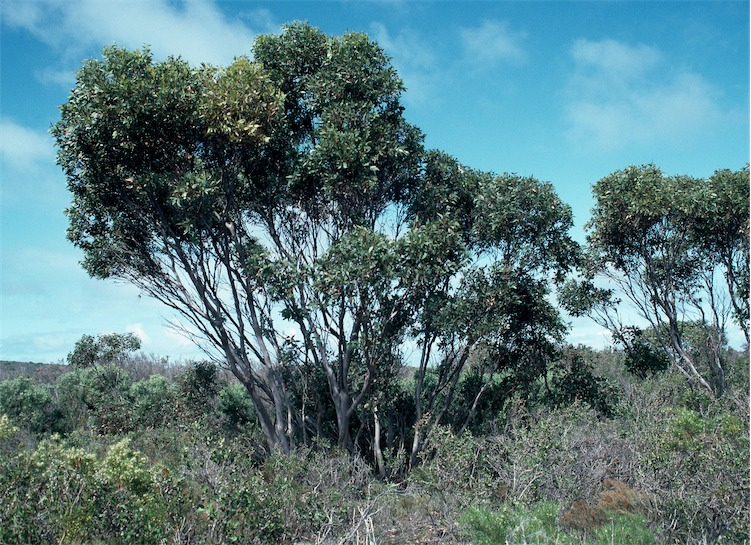
- Eucalyptus semiglobosa at Cape Le Grand National Park

Scientific classification
- Kingdom: Plantae
- Clade: Embryophytes
- Clade: Tracheophytes
- Clade: Spermatophytes
- Clade: Angiosperms
- Clade: Eudicots
- Clade: Rosids
- Order: Myrtales
- Family: Myrtaceae
- Genus: Eucalyptus
- Species: E. semiglobosa

Binomial name
- Eucalyptus semiglobosa (Brooker) L.A.S.Johnson & K.D.Hill

Synonyms
- Eucalyptus goniantha subsp. semiglobosa Brooker; Eucalyptus semiglobosa subsp. brevipedata L.A.S.Johnson & K.D.Hill MS

= Eucalyptus semiglobosa =

Species of eucalyptus

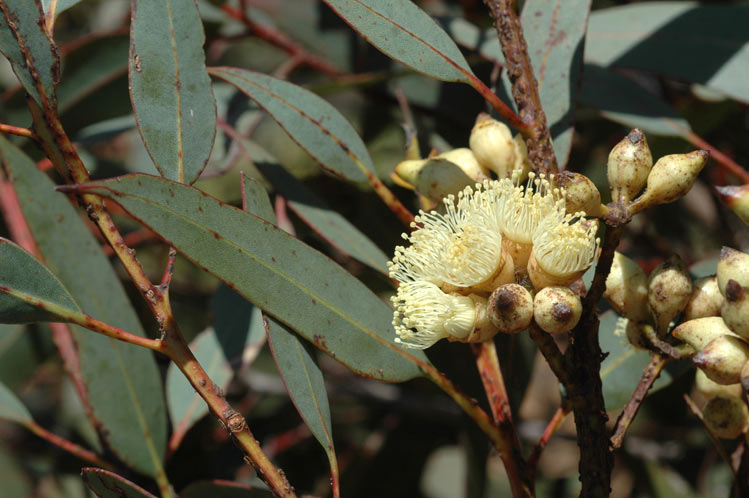
Flower buds and flowers

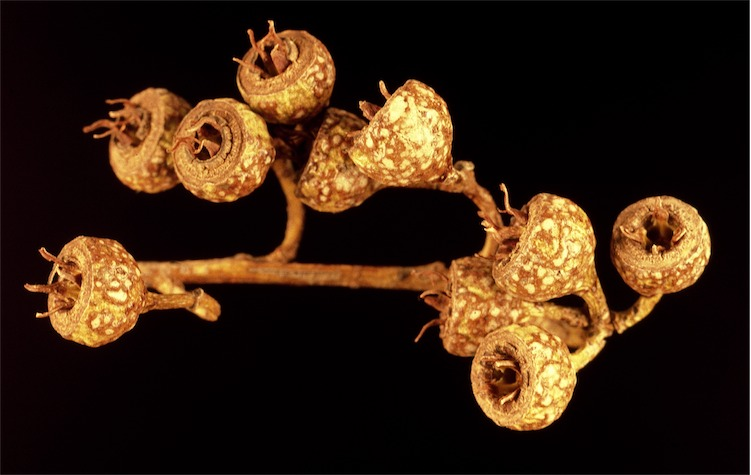
Fruit

Eucalyptus semiglobosa is a species of mallee or small tree that is endemic to the south coast of Western Australia. It has smooth bark, broadly lance-shaped adult leaves, flower buds in groups of seven, creamy white flowers and ribbed or wrinkled, shortened spherical or hemispherical fruit.

== Description ==
Eucalyptus semiglobosa is a shrub 2 m (6 ft 7 in) tall or mallee that typically grows to a height of 5 m (16 ft), and forms a lignotuber. It has smooth grey or light brown bark. Young plants and coppice regrowth have stems that are square in cross-section and leaves that are the same shade of green on both sides, elliptic to egg-shaped, 20–105 mm (0.79–4.13 in) and 10–60 mm (0.39–2.36 in) wide. Adult leaves are broadly lance-shaped, the same shade of dull to slightly glossy green on both sides, 60–120 mm (2.4–4.7 in) and 18–38 mm (0.71–1.50 in) wide on a petiole 12–32 mm (0.47–1.26 in) long. The flower buds are arranged in leaf axils in groups of seven on an unbranched peduncle 9–21 mm (0.35–0.83 in) long, the individual buds on pedicels 2–8 mm (0.079–0.315 in) long. Mature buds are oval, ribbed, 9–11 mm (0.35–0.43 in) and 7–9 mm (0.28–0.35 in) wide with a hemispherical operculum about the same length as the floral cup. The fruit is a woody, shortened spherical or hemispherical, ribbed or wrinkled capsule 8–10 mm (0.31–0.39 in) and 10–14 mm (0.39–0.55 in) wide with the valves protruding above the rim.

== Taxonomy and naming ==
This species was first formally described in 1976 by Ian Brooker in the journal Nuytsia and given the name Eucalyptus goniantha subsp. semiglobosa. In 1992, Lawrie Johnson and Ken Hill raised the subspecies to species status as E. semiglobosa in the journal Telopea and the change has been accepted at the Australian Plant Census. The specific epithet (semiglobosa) is from the Latin semi- meaning "half" and globosa meaning "globose", referring to the operculum.

== Distribution and habitat ==
This eucalypt is found in scattered populated growing on shallow sand over granite between the Cape Le Grand and Cape Arid National Parks in the Esperance Plains and Mallee biogeographic regions.

== Conservation status ==
Eucalyptus semiglobosa is classified as "Priority Three" by the Government of Western Australia Department of Parks and Wildlife meaning that it is poorly known and known from only a few locations but is not under imminent threat.

== See also ==
- List of Eucalyptus species
