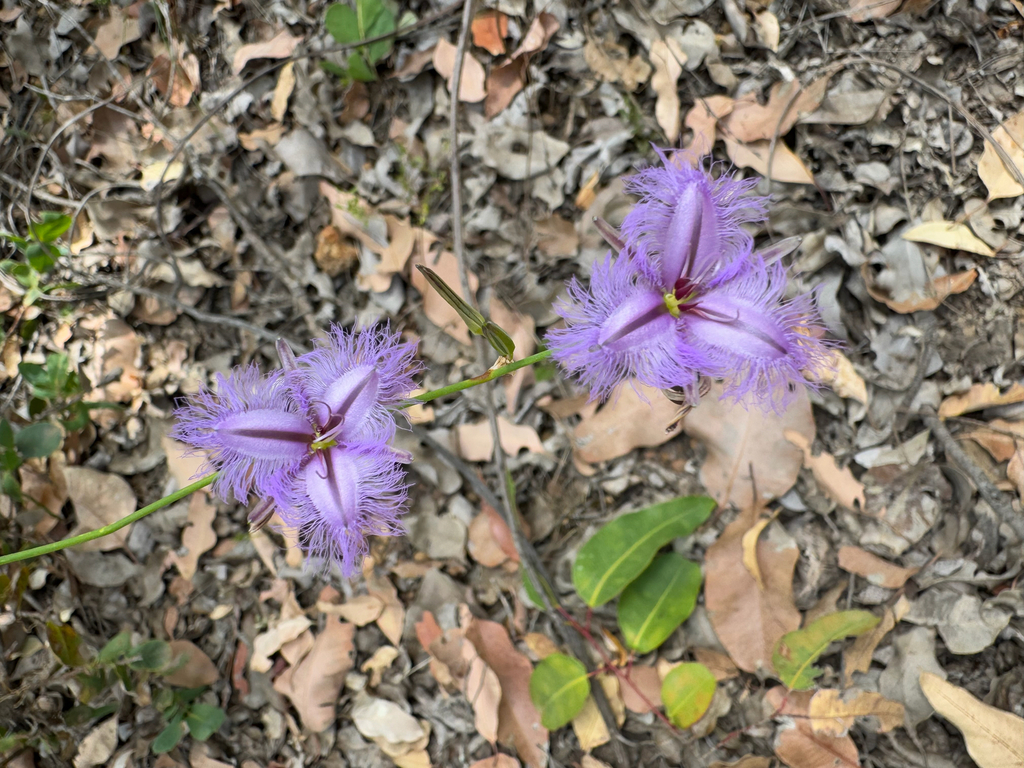
- Near Greenbushes

Scientific classification
- Kingdom: Plantae
- Clade: Tracheophytes
- Clade: Angiosperms
- Clade: Monocots
- Order: Asparagales
- Family: Asparagaceae
- Subfamily: Lomandroideae
- Genus: Thysanotus
- Species: T. sparteus

Binomial name
- Thysanotus sparteus R.Br.

= Thysanotus sparteus =

Species of flowering plant

Thysanotus sparteus, commonly known as leafless fringed lily, is a species of flowering plant in the Asparagaceae family, and is endemic to the south-west of Western Australia. It is a leafless, perennial herb with an irregularly shaped rhizome, fibrous roots and umbels of two to seven purple flowers with linear sepals, elliptic, fringed petals and six stamens.

== Description ==
Thysanotus sparteus is a leafless perennial herb with an irregularly shaped rhizome, fibrous roots and many branches. Young stems are ridged, densely to sparsely hairy and mature stems 39–100 cm (15–39 in) long, and occasionally hairy on the lowers 2–5 cm (0.79–1.97 in). The flowers are borne in groups of two to seven, in umbels on pedicels 10–20 mm (0.39–0.79 in) long. The perianth segments are 10–20 mm (0.39–0.79 in) long, the sepals linear, 2.0–3.5 mm (0.079–0.138 in) wide and the petals are purple, 5–7 mm (0.20–0.28 in) wide with a fringe 3–5 mm (0.12–0.20 in) wide. There are six stamens, the outer three anthers 2.5–5.5 mm (0.098–0.217 in) long and the inner anthers 7–10 mm (0.28–0.39 in) long and curved. The style is curved, 8–11 mm (0.31–0.43 in) long. Flowering occurs from October to December or February, and the fruit is elliptic, about 2 mm (0.079 in) long and 1 mm (0.039 in) in diameter with an orange aril.

== Taxonomy ==
Thysanotus sparteus was first formally described in 1810 by Robert Brown in Prodromus Florae Novae Hollandiae. The specific epithet (sparteus) means 'like esparto or spanish broom', referring to the broom-like habit of the species.

== Distribution and habitat ==
This species of Thysanotus is found from near Mingenew to near Cape Leeuwin, along the coast to Albany and eastwards to Esperance and towards Israelite Bay and several inland locations. It grows in jarrah-marri (Eucalyptus marginata-Corymbia calophylla) forest and woodland, sometimes in sandplain vegetation, in the Avon Wheatbelt, Esperance Plains, Geraldton Sandplains, Jarrah Forest and Mallee, Swan Coastal Plain and Warren biogregions of south-western Western Australia.

== Conservation status ==
Thysanotus sparteus is listed as "not threatened" by the Western Australian Government Department of Biodiversity, Conservation and Attractions.
