= Ten Mile Lagoon Wind Farm =

Wind farm in Western Australia

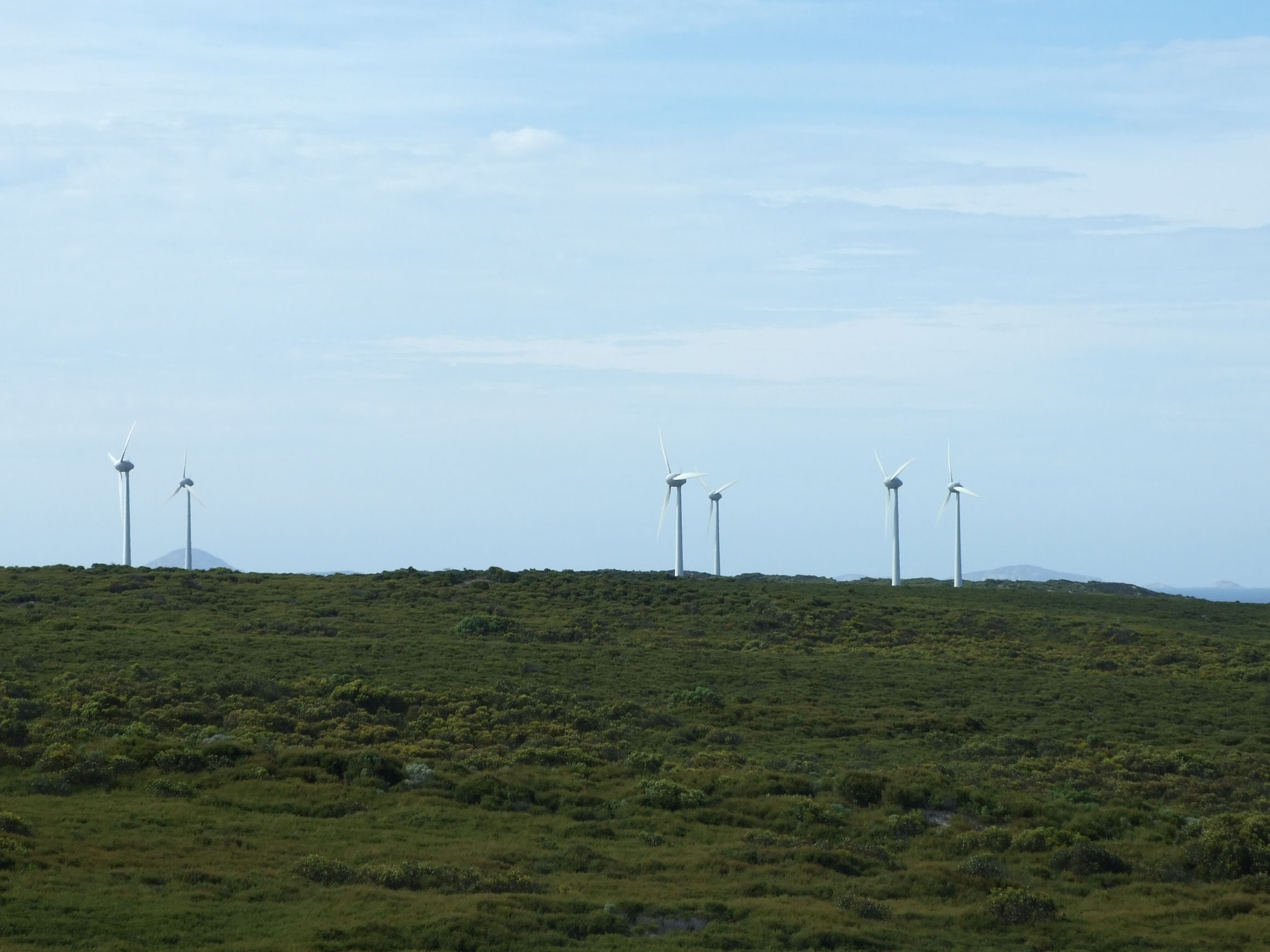
- Country: Australia
- Coordinates: 33°52′38″S 121°45′43″E
- Status: Decommissioned

Wind farm
- Type: Onshore
- Site usage: Wilderness
- Rotor diameter: 16 m (52 ft)

Power generation
- Units operational: 9 × 0.225 MW
- Make and model: Vestas Vestas V27 (9)

External links
- Commons: Related media on Commons

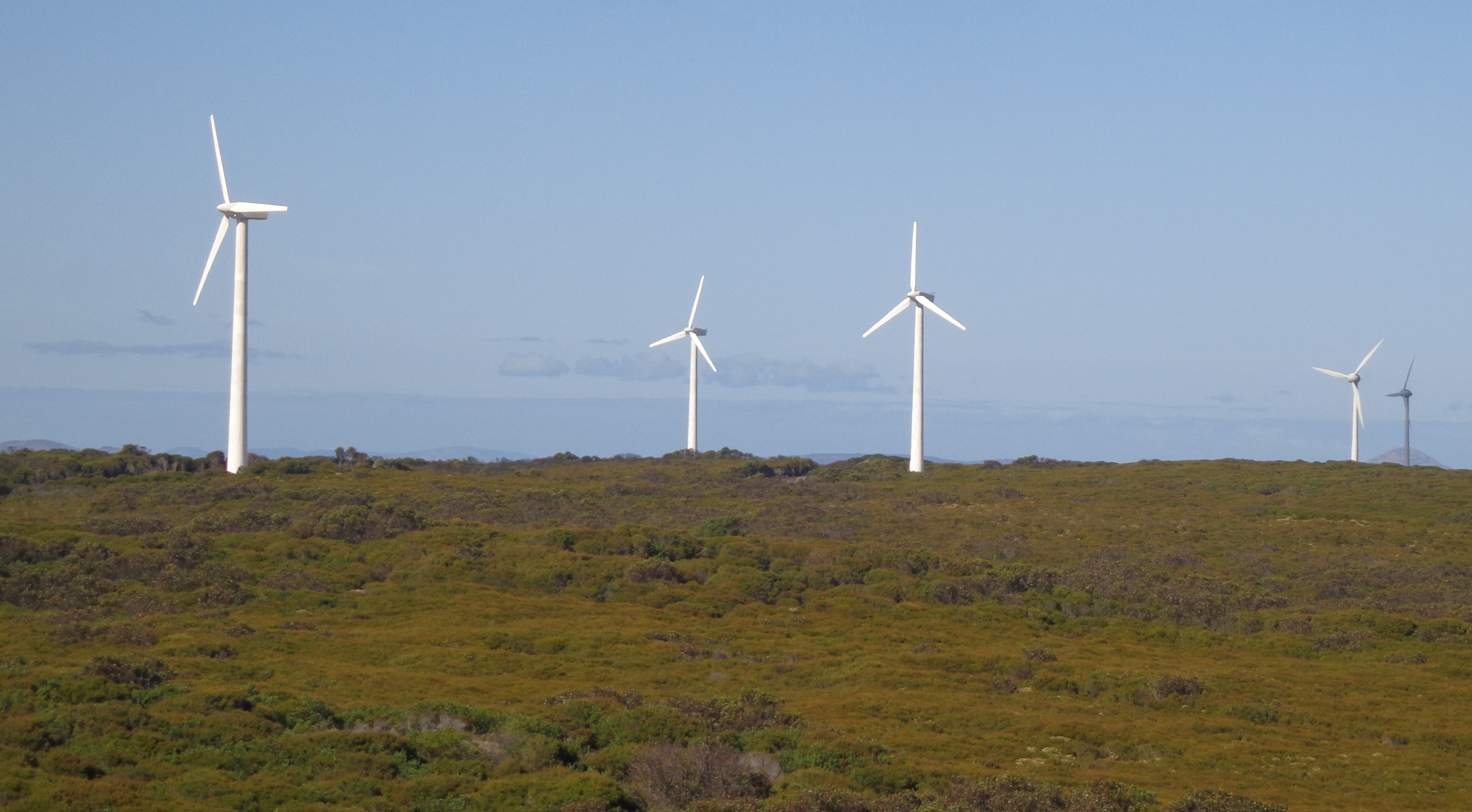
Ten Mile Lagoon wind farm from observation point

Ten Mile Lagoon wind farm was a wind farm situated on a coastal ridge 16 kilometres west of Esperance in Western Australia, located in the northern extremities of the reliable Roaring Forties winds. It was Australia's first commercial wind farm that was still operating, and consisted of nine 225 kW Vestas wind turbines giving a total generating capacity of just over 2 Megawatts. The farm was established in October 1993, after the successful operation of a smaller experimental wind farm at Salmon Beach, Esperance.

Esperance is an isolated town and it is not connected to the electricity grid. Before the installation of wind turbines, the electrical needs of Esperance town and surrounding districts were supplied solely from a diesel power station. The Ten Mile Lagoon wind farm served the Esperance community in conjunction with the power station and complemented the electricity generated by the gas turbines.

Considerable care was taken in the design and construction of the wind farm to ensure the least possible disturbance to the natural environment.

The Ten Mile Lagoon wind farm began decommissioning in 2022, along with the adjacent Nine Mile Beach Wind Farm. This followed several years of inactivity, and repowering of the site was not an option. The area was replanted and returned to its former status in 2026. Some of the turbines were repurposed on local farms.

== See also ==
- Wind power in Australia
