= Esperance, Western Australia =

Esperance Kepa Kurl (Wudjari)
- Town
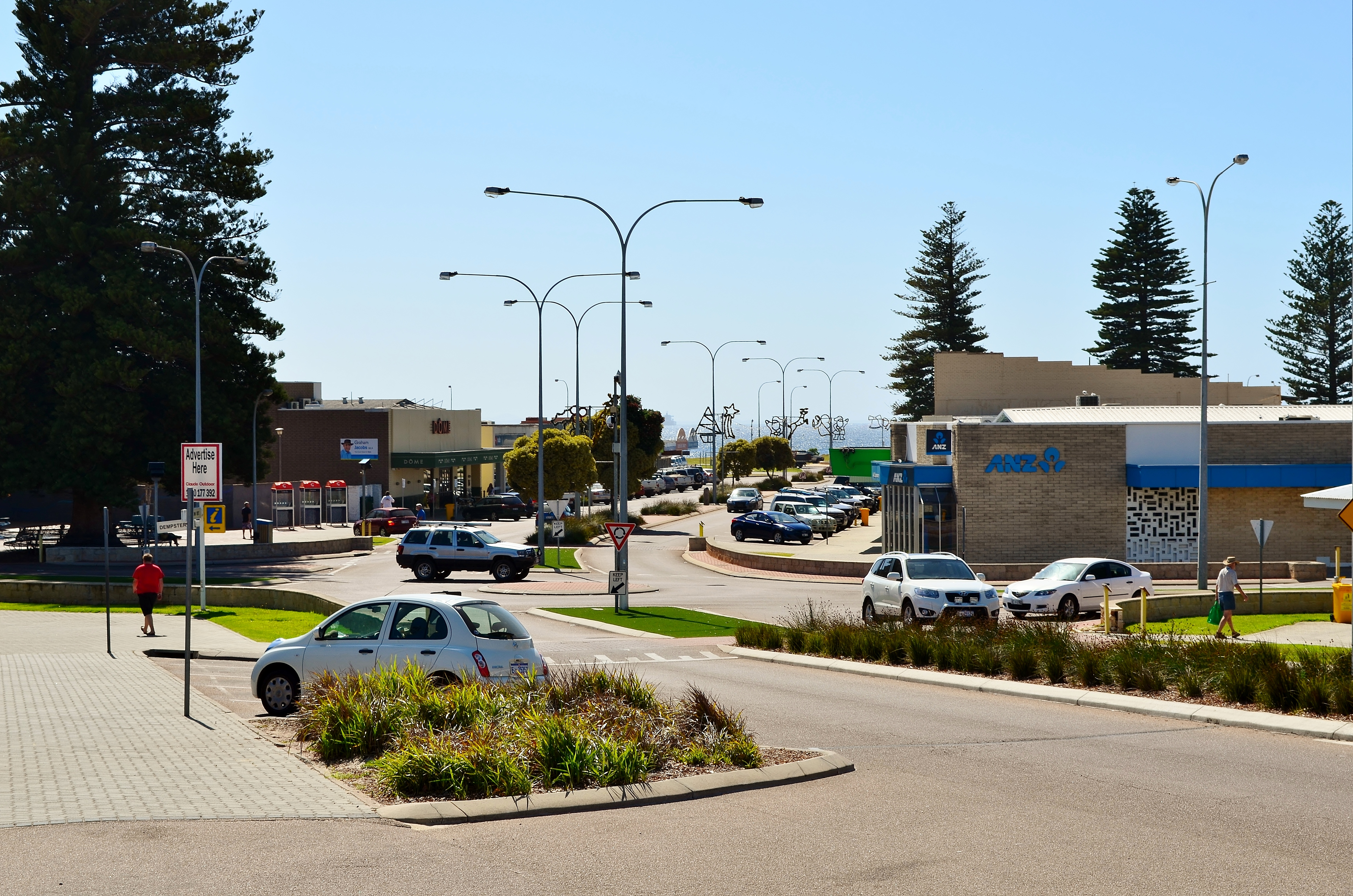
- View of the Esperance CBD, 2012

- Interactive map of Esperance
- Coordinates: 33°51′40″S 121°53′31″E
- Country: Australia
- State: Western Australia
- LGA: Shire of Esperance
- Location: 482 km (300 mi) from Albany; 391 km (243 mi) from Kalgoorlie; 713 km (443 mi) from Perth
- Established: 1893
- Council seat: Esperance

Government
  - State electorate: Roe
  - Federal division: O'Connor
- Elevation: 8 m (26 ft)

Population
  - Total: 13,883 (2021)
- Time zone: UTC+8 (AWST)
- Postcode: 6450
- Mean max temp: 22.0 °C (71.6 °F)
- Mean min temp: 12.2 °C (54.0 °F)
- Annual rainfall: 615.2 mm (24.22 in)

Esperance (Wudjari: Kepa Kurl (/kɛp.pɑː kɜːrl/, Kep-pa Kurl)) is a town in the Goldfields–Esperance region of Western Australia, on the southern coastline approximately 720 kilometres (450 mi) east-southeast of the state capital, Perth and 391 kilometres (243 mi) south of Kalgoorlie.

The urban population of Esperance was 12,003 at June 2018. Its major industries are tourism, agriculture, and fishing.

== Toponymy ==
The town is named after a French ship, the Espérance, which entered Esperance Bay in December 1792 to shelter from heavy seas and gale force winds.

The French-language word espérance means "hope", in the sense of an expectation of something probable, as opposed to a mere wish for something uncertain (ie espoir). So, eg, in mathematics, the term espérance mathématique is the French-language equivalent of the English-language term "expected value".

In the Wudjari language of the local Aboriginal people, who form part of the Noongar cultural group and live at its southern edge, the name of the area is Kepa Kurl (/kɛp.pɑː kɜːrl/ Kep-pa Kurl). According to the Esperance Tjaltjraak Native Title Aboriginal Corporation (ETNTAC):

"'Kepa' translates to water and 'kurl' to boomerang. Kepa Kurl means 'where the waters lie like boomerangs' and refers to the shape of the two bays closest to the Esperance townsite."

== History ==
European history of the region dates back to 1627 when the Dutch vessel Gulden Zeepaert, skippered by François Thijssen, passed through waters off the Esperance coast and continued across the Great Australian Bight.

French explorers are credited with making the first landfall near the present day town, naming it and other local landmarks while sheltering from a storm in this area in 1792.

In 1802, British navigator Matthew Flinders sailed the Bay of Isles, discovering and naming places such as Lucky Bay and Thistle Cove. Whalers, sealers and pirates followed, as did pastoralists and miners, keen to exploit the free land and cash in on the gold boom in the gold fields to the north.

The first European settlement of the Esperance townsite area was by the Dempsters, a pioneer family of Scottish descent, in the 1860s. The Dempster brothers – Charles, Edward, Andrew and James – were granted 123,000 hectares (304,000 acres) of land in the area, first settling in 1864. They initially brought sheep, cattle and horses overland from Northam, but in 1866 they shipped stock to the Esperance area from South Australia. They built Esperance's first landing, but only one ship made the Adelaide to Esperance voyage in the first year.

Once other settlers started taking up land on the Esperance coastal plain, a small settlement developed, serving as an important link in the Overland Telegraph between Albany and Eucla. A telegraph station was opened in 1876, although the formal gazettal of the townsite did not occur until 1893.

The town jetty was also built through the 1890s, following the discovery of gold in the eastern goldfields region. At this point, Esperance became the "gateway to the Goldfields."

The population of the town was 985 (623 males and 362 females) in 1898.

After visiting the town in 1898, Western Australian Premier John Forrest pledged to construct a railway line between Esperance and the Goldfields. However, due to a perceived threat that Adelaide merchants would take Goldfields trade away from Fremantle merchants via the Esperance port, Norseman was connected by rail to the Goldfields and Fremantle, but the line was not extended to Esperance. A railway line between Coolgardie and Esperance was eventually completed in 1927.

The Mallee area approximately 100 km (60 mi) north of the town began grain production in the 1920s, and by 1935 the construction of a second jetty, tankers jetty, was completed. After a rail link had been established between Salmon Gums and the Esperance port in 1925, the wheat harvest rose from 1,495 tonnes (1,471 long tons) that year to 4,446 tonnes (4,376 long tons) in 1929 and more than 15,858 tonnes (15,608 long tons) two years later.

Large-scale agriculture was introduced to the Esperance sand plain by an American syndicate, in partnership with the state government, in the 1960s following the discovery that adding superphosphate fertilisers containing trace elements to the poor soils made them suitable for cropping and pastoral activity. Despite early difficulties, the project eventually became a success and large areas of land were cleared during this time.

The population of the town in 1968 was approximately 2,700.

In 1979, pieces of the space station Skylab crashed onto Esperance after the craft broke up over the Indian Ocean. The municipality fined the United States $400 for littering. The fine was paid in April 2009, when radio show host Scott Barley of Highway Radio raised the funds from his morning show listeners, and paid the fine on behalf of NASA. Skylab's demise was an international media event, with merchandising, wagering on time and place of re-entry, and nightly news reports. The San Francisco Examiner offered a $10,000 prize for the first piece of Skylab to be delivered to their offices. Seventeen-year-old Stan Thornton scooped a few pieces of Skylab off the roof of his home in Esperance, caught the first flight to San Francisco, and collected the prize.

On 14 February 1991, the bulk carrier Sanko Harvest sank off Esperance, leaking 700 tonnes (1.5 million pounds) of bunker oil and 30,000 tonnes (66 million pounds) of fertiliser into the surrounding waters near the Recherche Archipelago; the wreck later became a marine sanctuary and dive site.

In January 2007 Esperance experienced a storm with wind gusts of up to 110 km/h (68 mph) which brought 155 mm (6 in) of rainfall within 24 hours, causing significant flooding. More than 100 homes were damaged, several boats were destroyed, trees were felled, 35 m (115 ft) of bridge on the South Coast Highway, (the main road linking Esperance to Perth), was washed away, and power was cut from thousands of homes. The Western Australian Government declared the area a "natural disaster zone". At least 37,000 sheep were killed in the storm.

== Climate ==
Esperance experiences a Mediterranean climate (Köppen climate classification Csb) with warm, dry summers and mild, wet winters. It is subject to wide variations in the weather, from hot summer days when northerly winds arrive from the interior of the state, to cold, wet winter days with southerly winds from the Great Southern Ocean. Annually, the town has 95.5 clear days.

Climate data for Esperance (1991–2020 averages, 1969–2022 extremes)
Month	Jan	Feb	Mar	Apr	May	Jun	Jul	Aug	Sep	Oct	Nov	Dec	Year
Record high °C (°F)	46.9 (116.4)	46.7 (116.1)	44.0 (111.2)	40.1 (104.2)	34.5 (94.1)	27.7 (81.9)	27.6 (81.7)	32.1 (89.8)	34.9 (94.8)	40.9 (105.6)	42.7 (108.9)	45.3 (113.5)	46.9 (116.4)
Mean maximum °C (°F)	40.7 (105.3)	38.9 (102.0)	37.9 (100.2)	32.9 (91.2)	28.2 (82.8)	23.3 (73.9)	22.8 (73.0)	26.4 (79.5)	28.5 (83.3)	33.8 (92.8)	37.2 (99.0)	38.3 (100.9)	42.7 (108.9)
Mean daily maximum °C (°F)	26.2 (79.2)	26.0 (78.8)	25.1 (77.2)	23.4 (74.1)	20.7 (69.3)	18.3 (64.9)	17.4 (63.3)	18.2 (64.8)	19.5 (67.1)	21.4 (70.5)	23.3 (73.9)	24.6 (76.3)	22.0 (71.6)
Daily mean °C (°F)	21.1 (70.0)	21.2 (70.2)	20.2 (68.4)	18.5 (65.3)	16.0 (60.8)	13.8 (56.8)	13.0 (55.4)	13.5 (56.3)	14.6 (58.3)	16.3 (61.3)	18.1 (64.6)	19.6 (67.3)	17.2 (62.9)
Mean daily minimum °C (°F)	15.9 (60.6)	16.4 (61.5)	15.3 (59.5)	13.5 (56.3)	11.2 (52.2)	9.3 (48.7)	8.5 (47.3)	8.8 (47.8)	9.6 (49.3)	11.1 (52.0)	12.9 (55.2)	14.5 (58.1)	12.2 (54.0)
Mean minimum °C (°F)	11.0 (51.8)	11.2 (52.2)	9.8 (49.6)	8.0 (46.4)	6.5 (43.7)	4.9 (40.8)	4.4 (39.9)	4.9 (40.8)	5.5 (41.9)	6.2 (43.2)	7.6 (45.7)	9.1 (48.4)	3.9 (39.0)
Record low °C (°F)	8.3 (46.9)	8.0 (46.4)	7.4 (45.3)	5.5 (41.9)	2.9 (37.2)	2.2 (36.0)	1.4 (34.5)	2.5 (36.5)	2.7 (36.9)	3.6 (38.5)	4.9 (40.8)	6.6 (43.9)	1.4 (34.5)
Average precipitation mm (inches)	34.1 (1.34)	25.3 (1.00)	34.0 (1.34)	39.5 (1.56)	63.1 (2.48)	72.8 (2.87)	91.5 (3.60)	86.3 (3.40)	66.6 (2.62)	43.5 (1.71)	34.5 (1.36)	22.0 (0.87)	615.2 (24.22)
Average precipitation days (≥ 0.2mm)	6.4	5.9	8.9	9.6	13.0	15.5	16.4	15.9	14.3	10.8	9.2	7.0	132.9
Average afternoon relative humidity (%)	57	57	57	58	57	59	59	56	57	56	57	57	57
Average dew point °C (°F)	13.3 (55.9)	13.8 (56.8)	12.7 (54.9)	11.4 (52.5)	9.5 (49.1)	8.0 (46.4)	7.1 (44.8)	7.0 (44.6)	7.8 (46.0)	8.6 (47.5)	10.5 (50.9)	11.8 (53.2)	10.1 (50.2)
Source 1: Bureau of Meteorology, Esperance (1991–2020) (dew point at 3pm)
Source 2: Bureau of Meteorology, Esperance (all years)

== Economy ==
=== Esperance Port ===
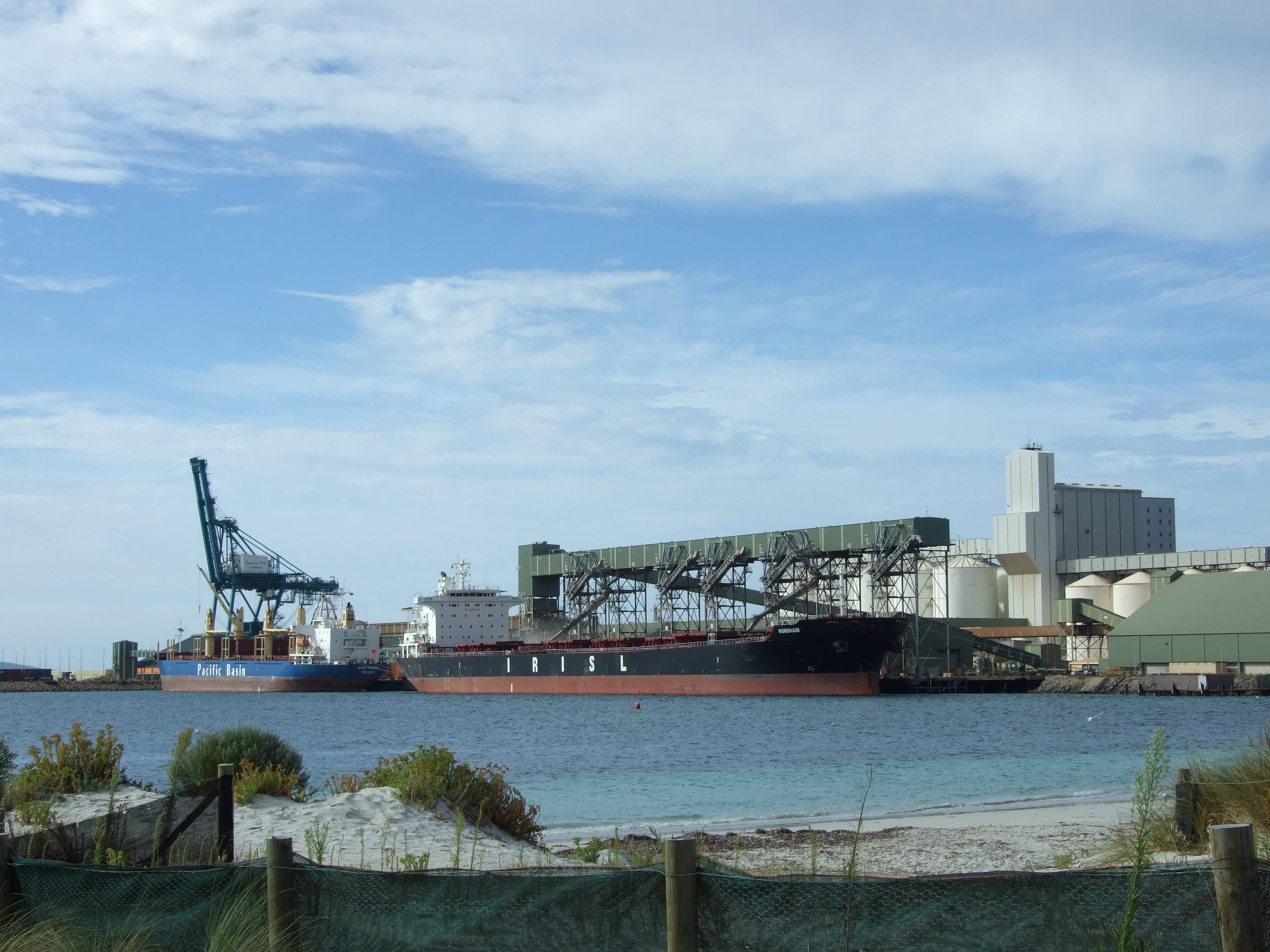
Grain loading at Esperance Port

Esperance has the only port in the south-east of Western Australia – the Esperance Port Authority completed an A$54 million upgrade in 2002. The upgrade made the port one of the deepest in southern Australia, capable of handling Cape-class vessels of up to 180,000 tonnes (400 million pounds), and fully loaded Panamax-class vessels of up to 75,000 tonnes (170 million pounds).

Exports for the year ending June 2005 were 7,694,155 tonnes (17 billion pounds), including 1.8 million tonnes (4 billion pounds) of grain, and 5.5 million tonnes (12 billion pounds) of iron ore which is railed from Koolyanobbing.

==== Lead and nickel contamination ====
In 2007, the deaths of thousands of wild birds alerted residents to a toxicity hazard which was found to be the unsafe transport by truck and rail of lead ore from Wiluna for export by ship. When elevated levels of lead were measured in a number of adults and children, as well as in water tanks, a multimillion-dollar cleanup was paid for by the state government. The miner, Magellan Metals, was banned from exporting lead through the port.

A parliamentary inquiry presented its report in November 2007. Before long, additional concerns were raised about pollution caused by nickel dust escaping from exported ore. In October 2008, the Esperance Port Authority banned the export of nickel after emission targets were exceeded twice, but the ban, which threatened Western Australia's $8 billion nickel industry, was overturned by the newly elected Premier of Western Australia, Colin Barnett.

=== Tourism ===
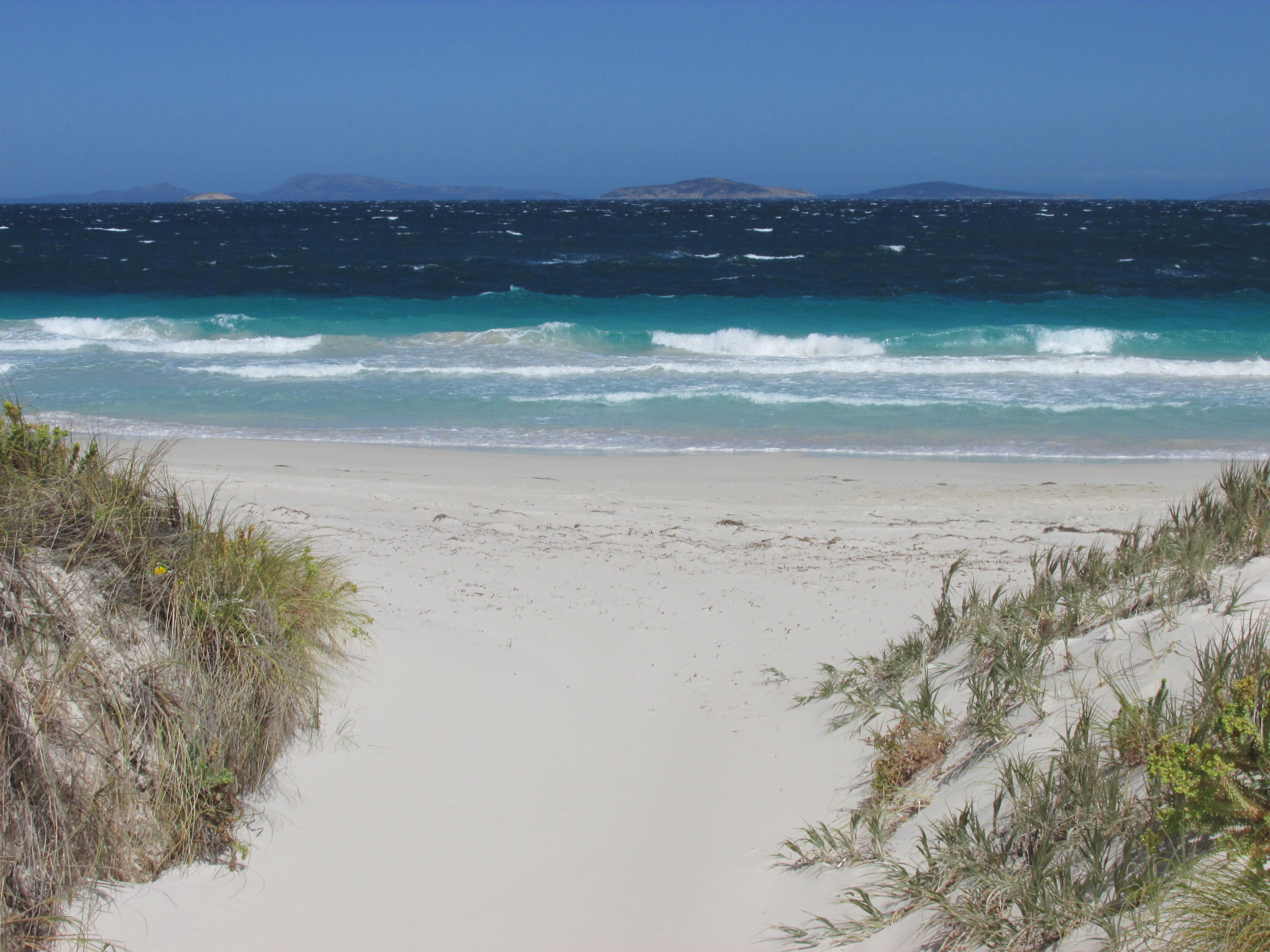
Esperance is renowned for its white sandy beaches and aqua coloured waters.

Near the town itself are numerous beaches, offering surfing, scuba diving, and swimming. Also nearby are a number of salt lakes, including Pink Lake which, despite its name, is rarely pink in colour.

There are five major national parks near the town. A major nearby tourist attraction, 20 minutes away from the town centre, is the Cape Le Grand National Park, which offers a picturesque coast of largely granite terrain and sheltered white sand beaches. The park is a popular spot for recreational fishing, as well as four wheel drive enthusiasts and hikers.

In October 2020, a surfer who was a member of the local community in Esperance was killed by a shark at Wylie Bay near the town.

=== Cooper Reef ===
Cooper Reef is a purpose-built artificial reef located approximately five kilometres from the Bandy Creek Boat Harbour. Named after its driving force, Mr Graham Cooper, The reef was built to attract fish and enhance fish stocks, creating new fishing and recreation opportunities for tourists, anglers and local families.

=== Wind turbines ===
Esperance also has a number of wind turbines supplying electricity to the town. Esperance had the first electrical wind farm in Australia, built at Salmon Beach as a research facility in 1987. Esperance was also home to the Ten Mile Lagoon Wind Farm, established in 1993, and the Nine Mile Beach Wind Farm, commissioned in 2003. Both sites were decommissioned in 2022, following several years of inactivity. In May 2022, a new renewables Hub was constructed by Horizon Power consisting of 2 new 4.45MW turbines and 4MW of solar.

== Education ==
There are five primary schools in the region: Our Lady Star of the Sea Catholic Primary School, Castletown Primary School, Esperance Primary School, Nulsen Primary School and Esperance Christian Primary School. There are also two secondary schools: Esperance Senior High School and Esperance Anglican Community School.

The Anglican school won an appeal in December 2009 against a State Government condition that limited it to grades 8–10; the school can now educate years 8–12.

South Regional TAFE also has a campus in the town, with a major redevelopment completed in 2021.

== Transport ==
Esperance is at the southern end of the Coolgardie–Esperance Highway and the eastern end of the South Coast Highway, both highways forming a part of Australia's Highway 1.

The town is connected by public transport to Perth, Albany and Kalgoorlie via Transwa coach services GE1, GE2, GE3 and GE4.

Regional Express Airlines has daily flights to/from Perth, arriving and departing from Esperance Airport. The Esperance-Perth route was previously serviced by Virgin Australia Regional Airlines and Skywest Airlines. The Esperance airport is also used for general aviation.

The Esperance branch railway is a standard gauge railway line from Kalgoorlie to Esperance, linking the region to the Trans-Australian Railway and the Eastern Goldfields Railway. This is a freight-only railway and no passenger services currently run.

== Sport ==
Esperance District Football Association is the region's Australian rules football league.

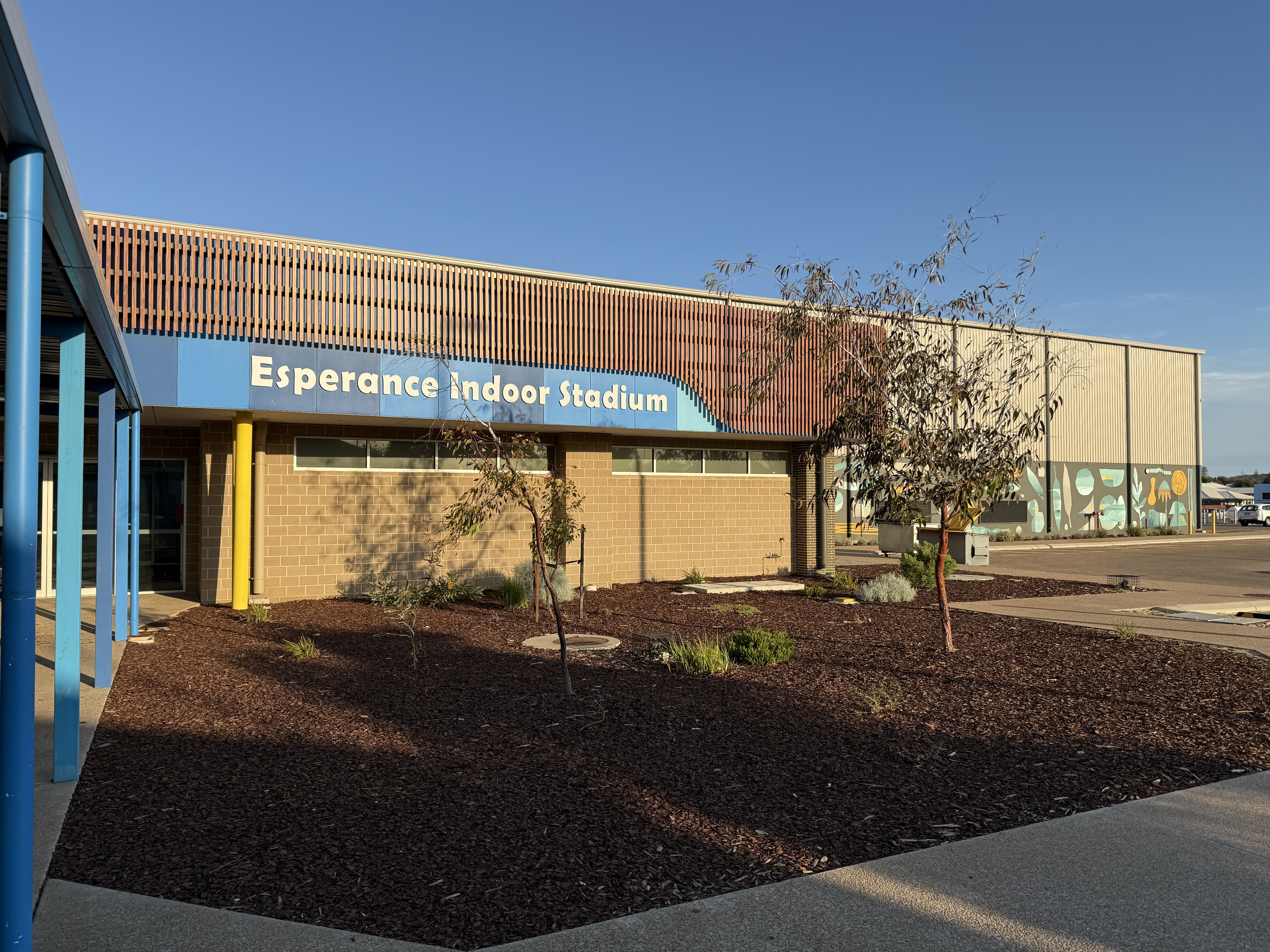
Esperance Indoor Stadium, January 2025

In 2020, a new $6 million indoor stadium was opened in Esperance, with Esperance Basketball Association being a major tenant. The Esperance Indoor Stadium hosted an NBL1 West fixture between the Goldfields Giants and South West Slammers during the 2022 season. The stadium was closed in 2024 after mould was discovered following a burst pipe. The four-court stadium required removal of all of its sports flooring at an estimated cost of $250,000. All costs were expected to be recovered through insurance.

Also in 2024, a local company was awarded the tender to design and build the replacement for the aged Graham MacKenzie Stadium, which was built in 1985.

== Media ==
A locally printed lifestyle, entertainment and news magazine, Esperance Tide, was first published in 2016. It was published monthly, on the first Friday of the month. The magazine ceased publication in September 2023.

Up until 2020, the local newspaper for the Esperance region was The Esperance Express. The Australian Community Media Group (ACM) suspended the weekly paper production due to the COVID-19 pandemic.

In 2021 a new local newspaper was formed, the Esperance Weekender. It was published weekly on Friday. In November 2025 the newspaper ceased publication leaving the Kalgoorlie Miner as the remaining newspaper in the region.

ABC Esperance is the local ABC station in Esperance, servicing the entire region. It broadcasts a local breakfast show and a co-produced local statewide morning show each weekday from studios at 80B Windich Street in the city. ABC Esperance also has a local news service, produced by local journalists. As well as rural reports, ABC Esperance broadcasts national programs like AM, Conversations, The World Today, PM, Nightlife, Overnights, Grandstand, Speaking Out, Saturday Night Country, and Australia All Over, along with a WA-centred weekend early morning and breakfast show, broadcast from either Perth, Albany or Kalgoorlie. Other national ABC services that are available in Esperance on separate FM frequencies include Triple J, RN, ABC Classic FM and ABC NewsRadio.

== Notable residents ==
- West Coast Eagles 2006 Premiership player Quinten Lynch lives in Grass Patch, a farming region of Esperance.
- Former Neighbours actor Dan Paris was raised in Esperance and works as a photographer and helps with the harvest season in surrounding farms.

== Twin town ==
- (France) Saint-Martin-de-Ré, Charente-Maritime

== See also ==
- Recherche Archipelago
