= Cape Le Grand National Park =

National park in Western Australia

- IUCN category II (national park)
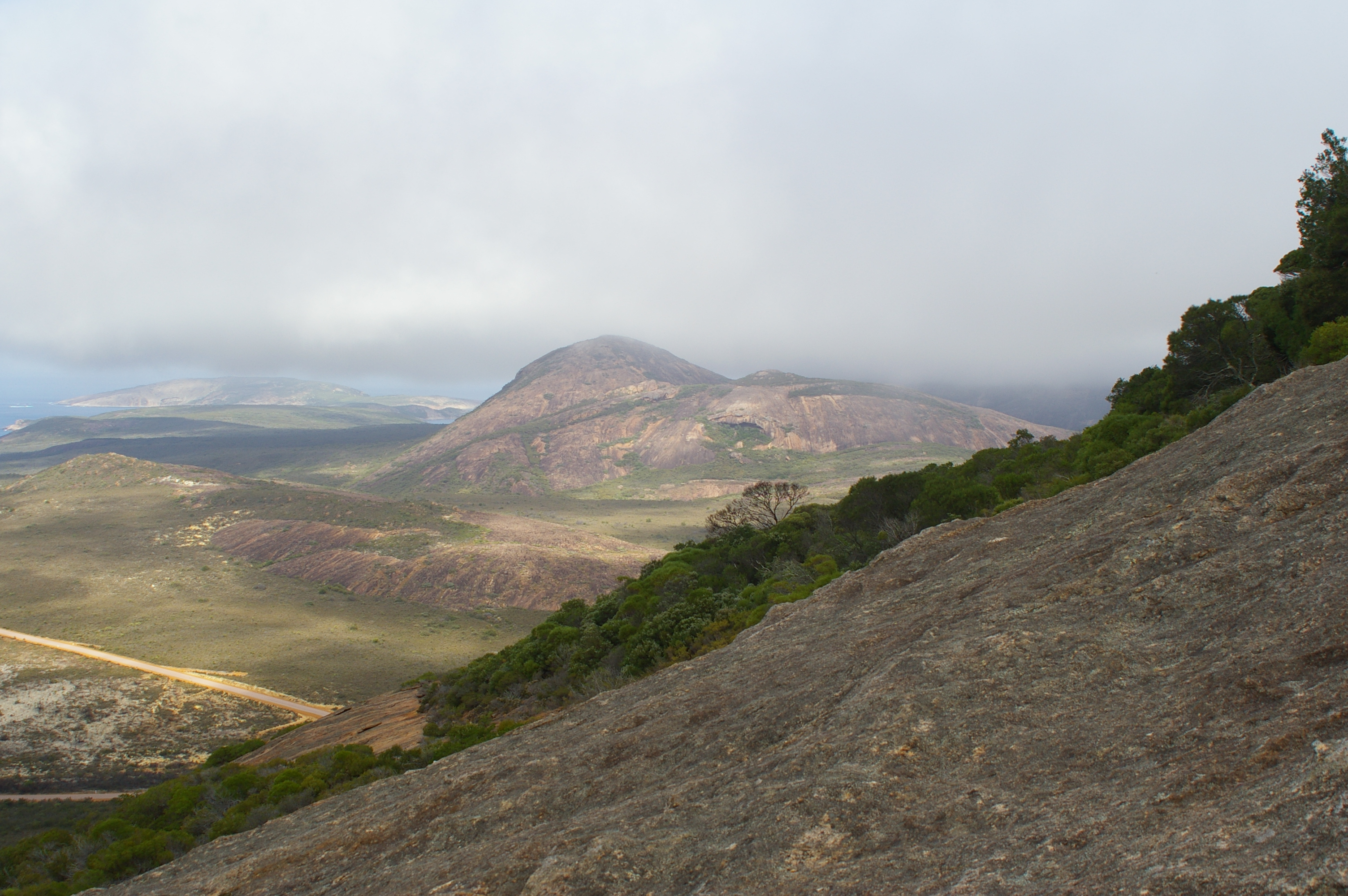
- Mount Le Grand from Frenchman Peak

- Location within Western Australia
- Location: Western Australia
- Nearest city: Esperance
- Coordinates: 33°56′49″S 122°09′20″E
- Area: 318.01 km^{2} (122.78 sq mi)
- Established: 1966
- Governing body: Department of Parks and Wildlife
- Website: https://exploreparks.dbca.wa.gov.au/park/cape-le-grand-national-park

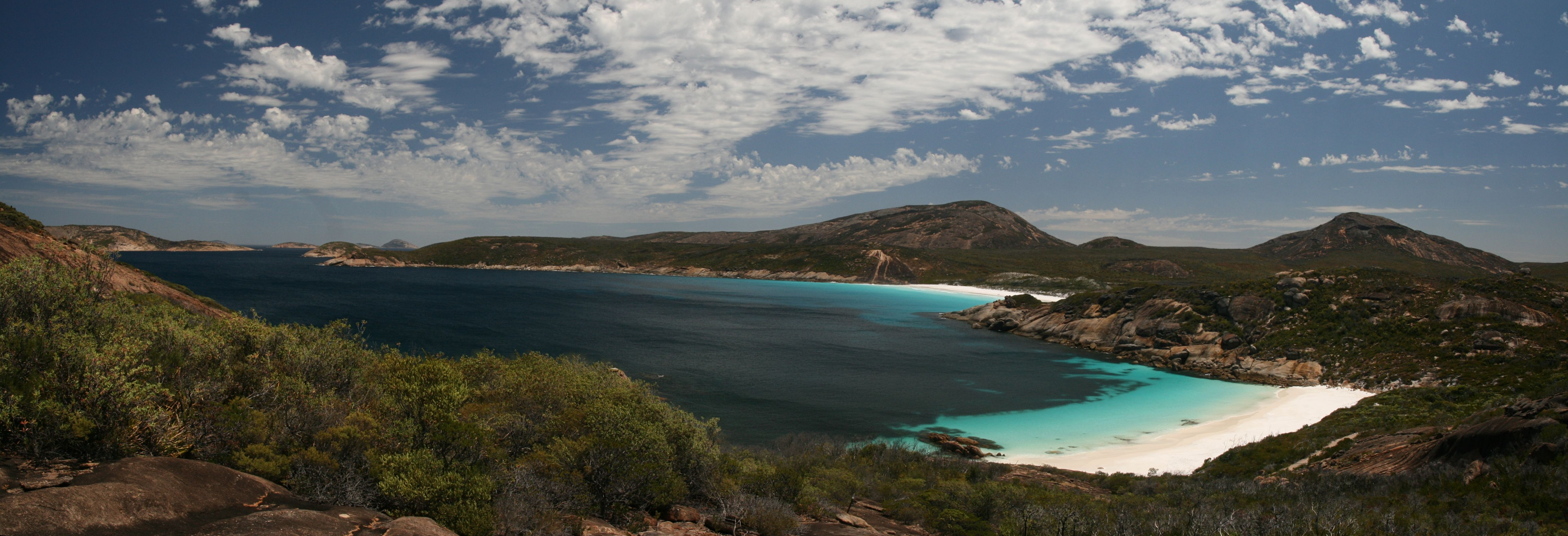
Panorama of the cape

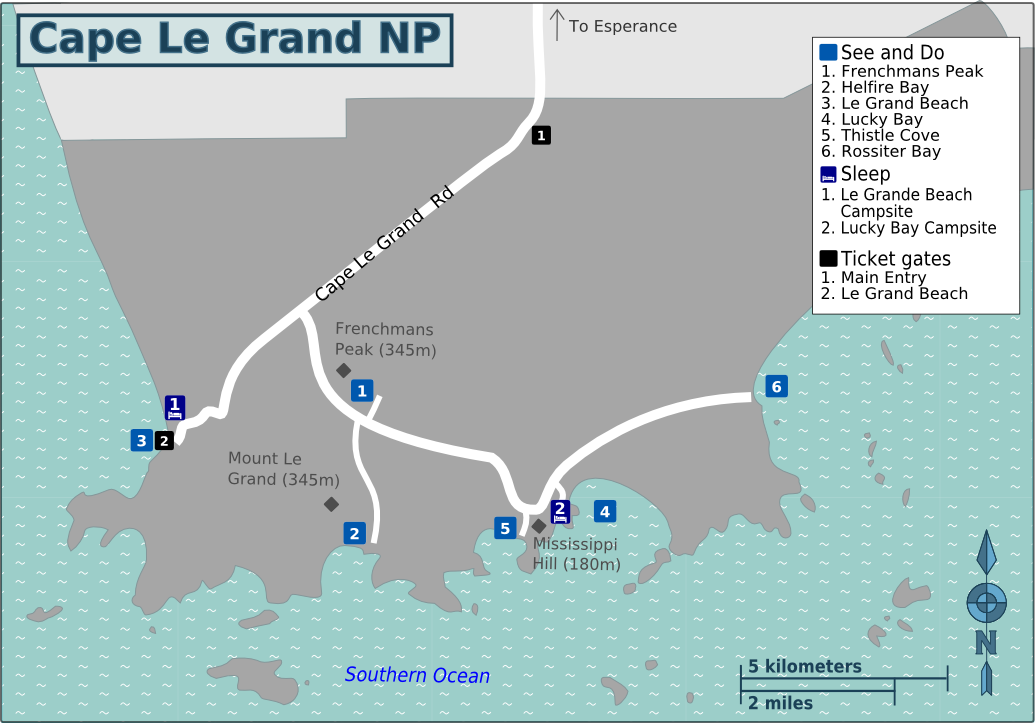
Cape Le Grand map

Cape Le Grand National Park is a national park in Western Australia, 631 km (392 mi) south-east of Perth and 56 km (35 mi) east of Esperance. The park covers an area of 31,801 hectares (78,580 acres). The area is an ancient landscape which has been above sea level for well over 200 million years and remained unglaciated. As a result, the area is home to many primitive relict species. Established in 1966, the park is managed by the Department of Parks and Wildlife. The name Le Grand is from one of the officers on L'Espérance, one of the ships in the 1792 expedition of Bruni d'Entrecasteaux.

The locality of Cape Le Grand of the Shire of Esperance shares almost identical boundaries with the national park, the exception being a number of roads in the west of the park and locality, which are part of the later but not the former.

== Geography ==
The largely granite shoreline and white sand beaches are picturesque features of the area. The park is a used for fishing, off-roading, tourism, and hiking. Beaches within the Park include those at Lucky Bay, Rossiter Bay, Hellfire Bay, Le Grand Beach, and Thistle Cove. The islands and waters to the south of the park are known as the Recherche Archipelago Nature Reserve, another protected area of the Recherche Archipelago and nearby coastal regions. The Cape Arid National Park is located to the east. The southwest section of the park is dominated by rock outcrops of gneiss and granite. These form a distinctive chain of peaks including Mount Le Grand (345 m), Frenchman Peak (262 m), and Mississippi Hill (180 m, named after the Mississippi, a French whaler). Further inland, the park comprises mostly heath-covered sandplain, interspersed with swamps and pools of fresh water.

== Wildlife ==
The sandplains support dense stands of banksias (Banksia speciosa and Banksia pulchella).

Other flora that can be found around the park include species of Melaleuca, Grevillea, sheoak, Christmas tree and grass trees. Wildflower blooms peak in the austral spring, lasting until October and species such as blue china orchid Cyanicula gemmata, Diuris corymbosa, Hakea laurina, Thysanotus sparteus and Thelymitra macrophylla are represented within the park.

Fauna that are commonly found within the park include bandicoots, pygmy honey possums, ring tailed possums, quenda and western grey kangaroos. Some of the relict species with gondwanan links that are found within the park include species of legless lizard, like the common scaly-foot Pygopus lepidopodus, and Delma fraseri, Delma australis and Aprasia striolata. The ancient, although non-gondwanan, blind snake Ramphotyphlops australis is also found within the park. Endemic frogs found within the area include the quacking frog Crinia georgiana, the banjo frog Limnodynastes dorsalis and the humming frog Neobatrachus pelobatoides.

== Facilities ==
Facilities include toilets, barbecues, campsites, tables, sheltered areas, walk trails, information bays, and water tanks. Two full-time rangers are residents of the park. Check the Cape LeGrand Campground website for booking details. During busy holiday periods, there is a 'camp host' couple who helps manage the site.

== Gallery ==
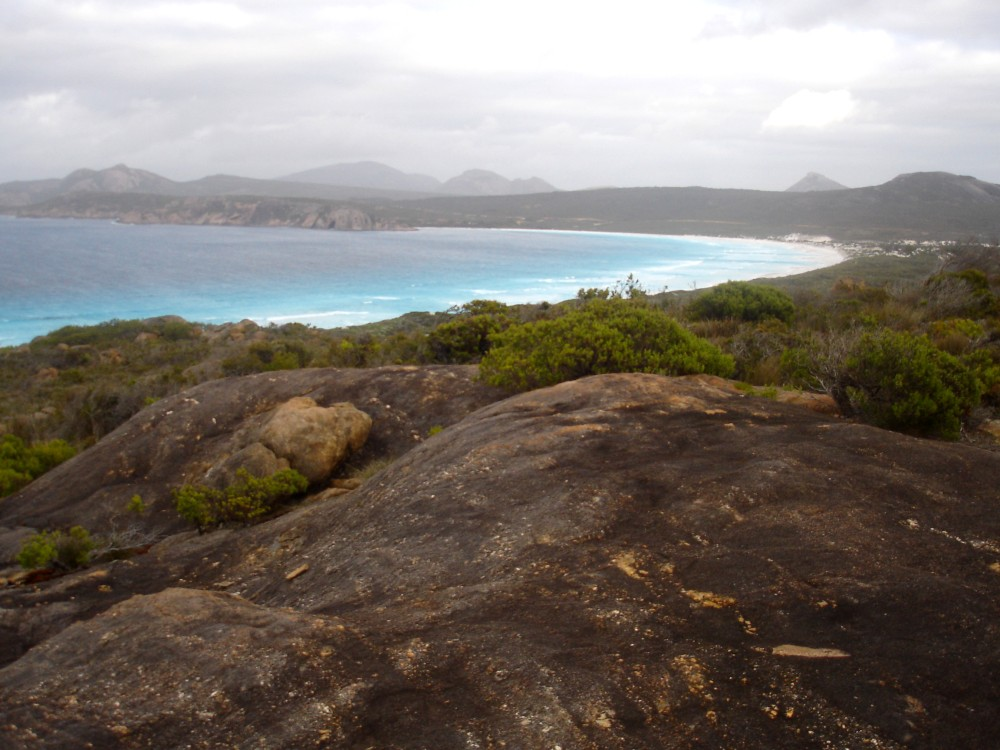
Overlooking Lucky Bay, one of the beaches at Cape Le Grand

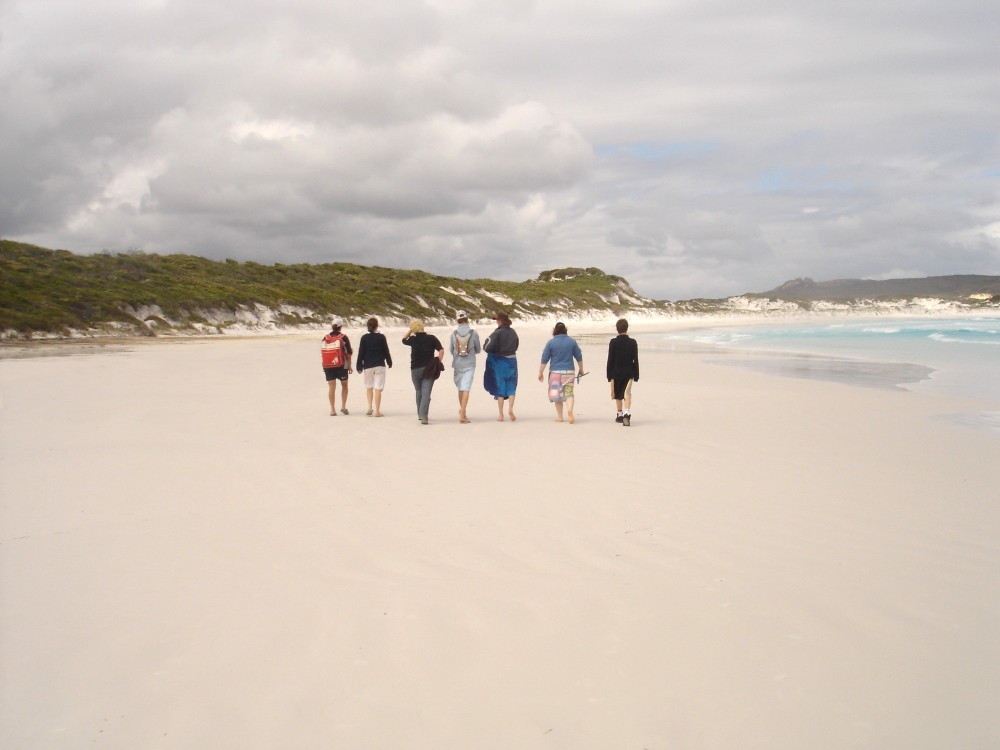
Lucky Bay is a popular destination for tourists.

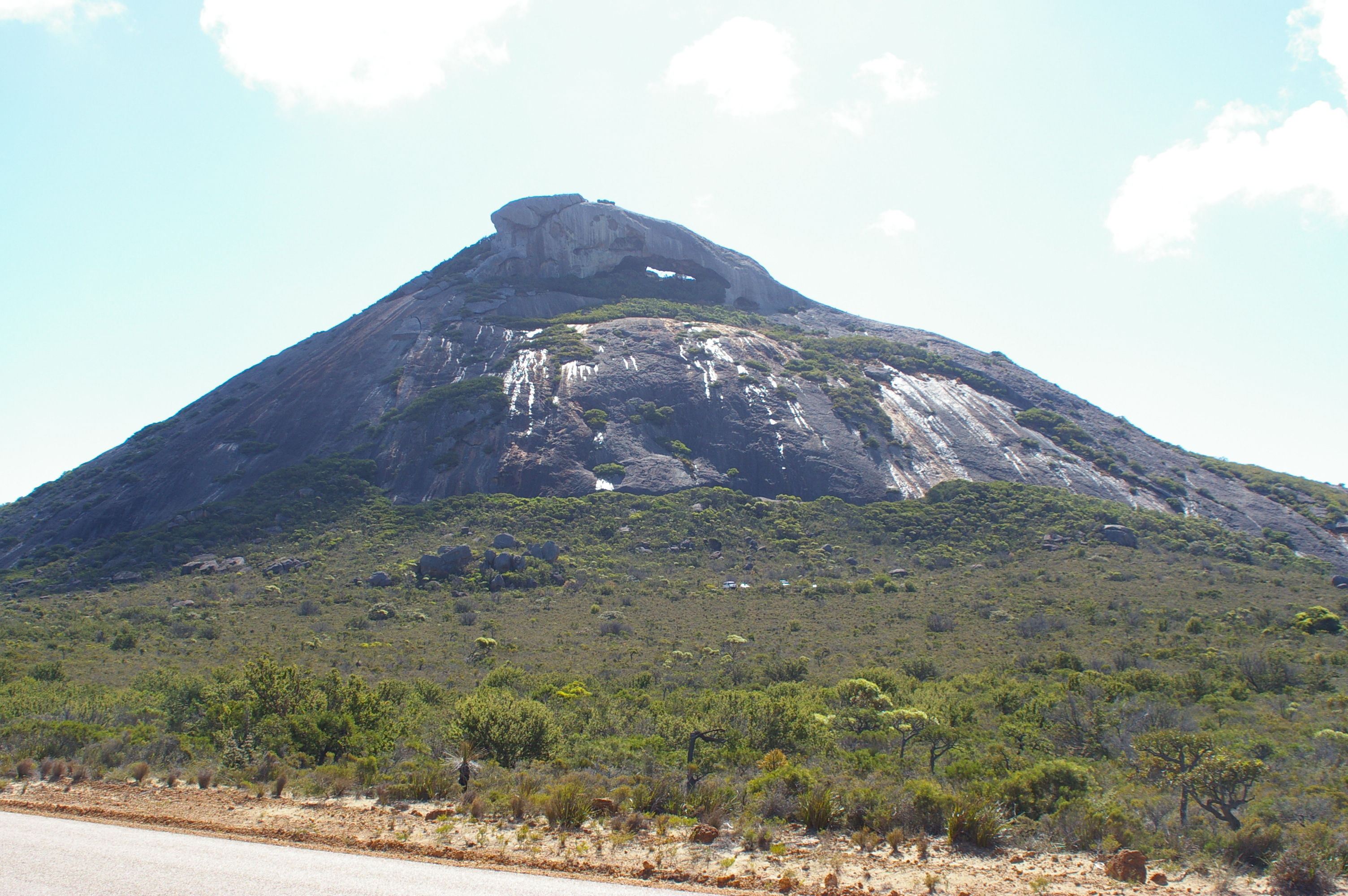
Frenchman Peak

== See also ==
- Protected areas of Western Australia
- Cape Le Grand National Park travel guide from Wikivoyage
- Lucky Bay, a beach near the park
