= History of electricity supply in Queensland =

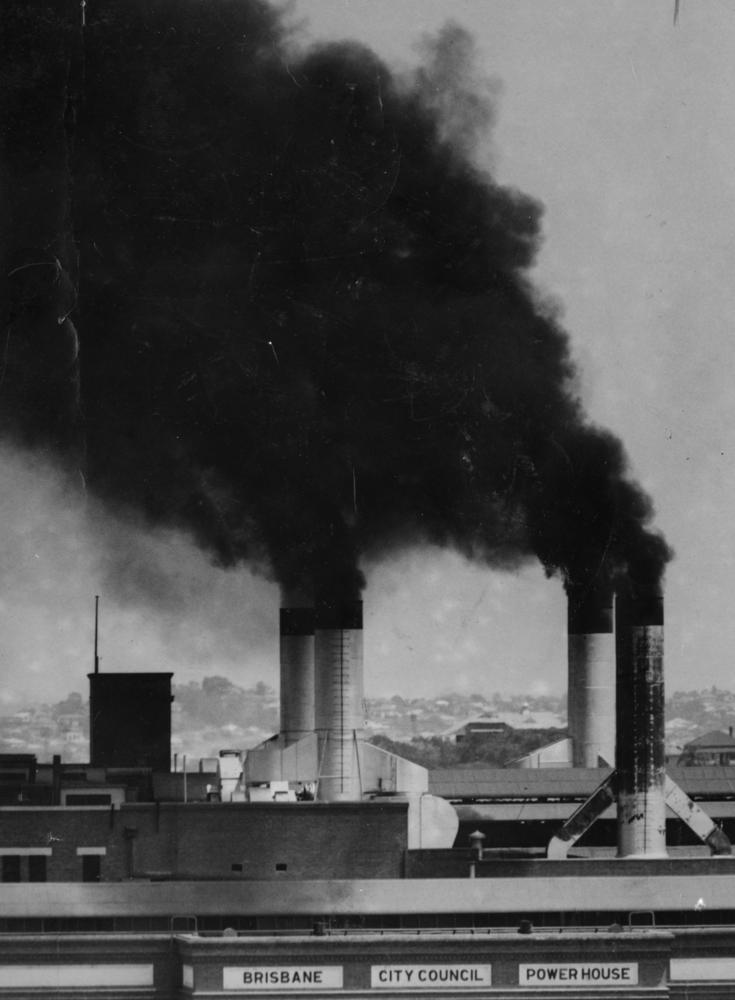
The New Farm Powerhouse in 1952 (now the Brisbane Powerhouse multi-arts venue)

The provision of electricity in Queensland (Australia's second largest state in terms of physical area) required a considerable degree of pioneering, innovation, and commitment. Queensland proved to be a pioneer in the supply of electricity in Australia, with the first public demonstration in Australia, the first recorded use for public purposes in the country, the first Parliament House in Australia and the first commercial operations in Australia all occurring in Brisbane.

Generation and limited distribution was initially the responsibility of local authorities, until a central state-based authority to coordinate the generation and distribution of electrical power was established in 1938. In the late 1990s, the electricity sector was restructured to enable integration with the National Electricity Market (NEM).

The history of power generation and distribution in Queensland can be considered in three major phases: Initial local generation and distribution; creation of a statewide body and the consequent creation of an extensive network; and the restructure to enable integration with the NEM.

Queensland is the most decentralised mainland state, and initial local generation and distribution was the only viable option for the supply of electricity in many instances. The creation of regional, and then a statewide network from 1945 enabled economies of scale and reliability to be obtained, particularly by generating plants. Within a decade of the statewide network being completed, the establishment of the NEM provided new commercial opportunities for generators and improved reliability of supply.

== Initial local generation and distribution ==
=== 1882-1925 ===
In 1882, a demonstration of what electricity could do was conducted with eight arc lights along Queen Street in Brisbane, the capital and largest city in Queensland. Power was supplied by a 10 hp generator driven by a small engine in a foundry in Adelaide Street. This was Australia's first recorded use of electricity for public purposes.

The first practical use of electricity was for lighting in the Government Printing Office in George Street in April 1883. In 1886, arc lights were in use at the Roma Street Railway Yards and in the same year, an underground cable connected the Parliament House from the Printing Office, the first of any Parliament House in Australia. The supervision of the laying of cable was done by E.C. Barton, who formed a company with C.F. White and in 1888 built a power house in Edison Lane behind the General Post Office with a generating capacity of 30 kW. The General Post Office became the first consumer of electricity in Australia and Barton and White the first electricity supplier in Australia. Adjoining shops were supplied by overhead wires, becoming the first non-government customers.

In 1896, Barton ceased his partnership with White and established the Brisbane Electric Supply Co., which in 1899 relocated from Edison Lane to Ann St. In 1904 the company renamed itself the City Electric Lighting Co. (CEL). Growing demand resulted in CEL building a new power station in William St in 1910 with a capacity of 1.2 MW, with the 0.5 MW plant relocated from Ann St in the same year and a further 0.7 MW capacity added the following year. In 1914 CEL converted to AC generation, DC being used until that time.

In the meantime the Brisbane Tramway Co. decided to electrify its network, and in 1897 it built Queensland's first significant power station at Countess Street, generating 0.9 MW @ 550 VDC, with capacity expanded to 4.05 MW by 1915 as the network was progressively electrified, as well as the construction of a second plant at Light Street with a capacity of 1.05 MW in 1913.

The first regional electricity supply was established in the far western town of Thargomindah. A street lighting system was installed in 1892, and in 1898 commenced generating electricity using Australia's first hydro-electric plant, using the water pressure from a water bore, a system which remained until replaced by diesel generators in 1951.

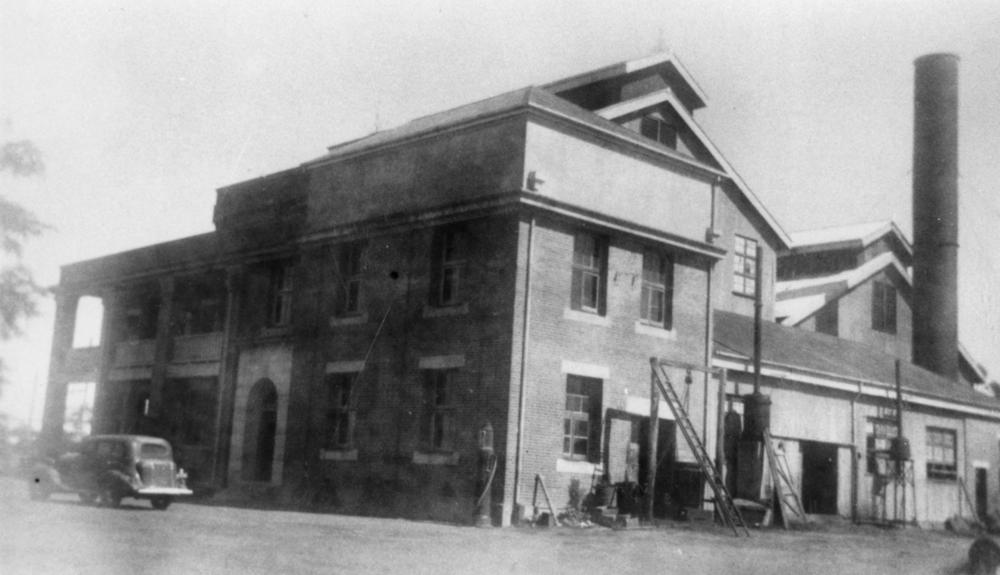
Home Hill Power Station, ~1946

The Rockhampton Gas & Coke Co. began to supply electricity in that city in 1892, with the Rockhampton City Council assuming responsibility for electricity supplies in 1924. Electricity was supplied in Charters Towers in 1897, Toowoomba in 1905, Warwick in 1912 and Barcaldine in 1915, each by a local power station. Ipswich was supplied by CEL building Queensland's first significant transmission line, a 5 kV line extending 40 km to the town in 1917. Local power stations began operating in Dalby and Longreach in 1921, Townsville in 1922 using coal from Collinsville supplied by the newly opened railway line, and Home Hill in the same year for Queensland's first significant irrigation program. The Goondiwindi power station was established in 1924, and those in Cairns and Kingaroy the following year.

=== 1925-1938 ===
In 1925, The greater Brisbane City Council (BCC) was created, from the old City of Brisbane, City of South Brisbane and various smaller Towns (Hamilton, Ithaca, Sandgate, Toowong, Windsor and Wynnum) and Shires (Balmoral, Belmont, Coorparoo, Enoggera, Kedron, Moggill, Sherwood, Stephens, Taringa, Tingalpa, Toombul and Yeerongpilly).

CEL held the 'franchise' for the former Brisbane and South Brisbane Council areas, and when the BCC decided to take over the generation and distribution of electricity, it offered to purchase CEL in 1926, the offer being rejected. Council had taken over the tramways network with three small powerhouses, none with enough capacity for expansion of the electricity network. To be able to expand, Council decided to construct a new powerhouse, and in 1928, the New Farm Powerhouse (now known as the Brisbane Powerhouse) became operational. The station had an initial capacity of 18.75 MW, expanding to 93.75 MW upon completion. The Countess St power station was decommissioned in the same year.

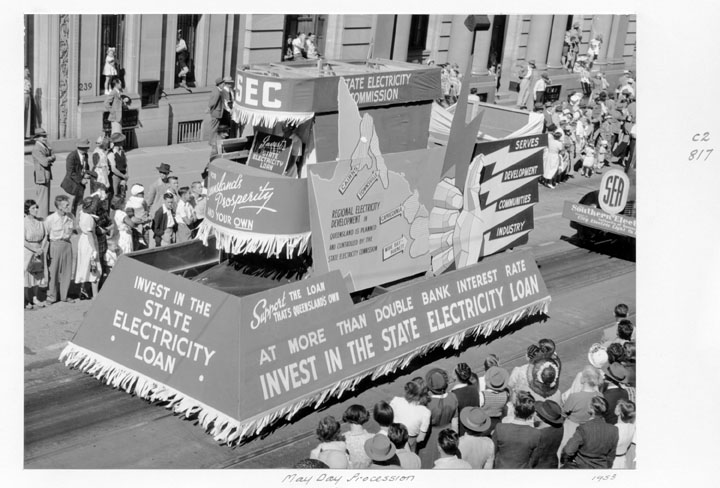
State Electricity Commission float in the 1953 May Day parade

CEL opened the Bulimba A (also known as Gibson Island) power station in 1926 with an initial capacity of 12.5 MW, this being expanded to 92.5 MW by 1944. The William St power station was closed in 1931, and the plant sold to the Evans & Deakin engineering company. No longer able to expand its customer base in Brisbane, CEL commenced a program of rural electrification, which by 1933 was supplying the Lockyer Valley, by 1935 had connected to Cleveland, Tingalpa, Beenleigh, Coomera, Tamborine and Waterford and towns within Pine Shire such as Strathpine and Petrie, and by 1936 extended to Mt Cotton, Bethania, Pimpama, Ormeau, Kingston, Dayboro, Samford and Redcliffe.

Stand alone power stations continued to be built, opening in Nambour and Winton in 1927, Murgon in 1929, Clermont in 1930 and Killarney in 1931, the year that Oakey was supplied from Toowoomba. Power generation in the Cairns region was expanded in 1935 with the opening of Queensland's first significant hydro-electric power station at Barron Falls, containing 3 x 1.32 MW generators, this being considered more cost effective than railing coal from the Bowen Basin. The expanded capacity enabled Atherton and Gordonvale to be supplied from that year.

Meanwhile, electricity began being supplied to individual towns by non-government sources, such as the Butter Factory in Toogoolawah, which supplied that town in 1927, and then built a transmission line to supply Esk and Lowood in the same year, and was reported as having connected the "entire Brisbane (River) Valley" by 1936. The Butter Factories in Nanango and Allora supplied those towns from 1933, as did a sawmill in Wondai in the same year.

1935 saw the State Government hold a Royal Commission into the electricity industry, it recommending a 'consolidated approach' to expansion of supply, which resulted in the creation of the State Electricity Commission of Queensland (SECQ) in 1938 to coordinate further works.

==== BCC 11 kV Electricity Supply Department Substations ====
Former Council Area	Year Electricity transferred to BCC
Ithaca	1926
Yerongpilly	1928
Hamilton	1930
Balmoral	1930
Coorparoo	1930
Stephens	1930
Sherwood	1931
Wynnum	1932
Taringa	1932
Windsor	1933
Toowong	1934
Toombul	1934
Enoggera	1935

In addition to supplying the tramways network, the New Farm Powerhouse also allowed for the construction of an 11 kV network to supply power for electric light. Previously CEL had supplied these area under 10 year orders, but with Council having a new powerhouse, they slowly inherited the new areas of supply as each order expired. By 1935, only the old City of Brisbane and City of South Brisbane were still supplied by CEL, with the rest of Brisbane supplied by the BCC Electricity Supply Department.

Four initial 11 kV Substations were constructed in 1928 by Council at: Victoria Park (No.4), Lang Park (No. 6), Victoria Street, Woolloongabba (No. 9) and Cairns St, Kangaroo Point (No.11). By 1930 they had constructed four more 11 kV Substations: Balmoral (No. 12), Stephens (now Moorooka) (No. 13), Hamilton (No. 5), and Coorparoo (No. 10). These substations were supplied with 11 kV, and had to transform down to 5 kV, which was the voltage that CEL had constructed in these areas. The primary purpose initially was to supply residential areas with electric light, as electricity was an expensive commodity, and most houses did not use it for any other purposes.

These substations were constructed in accordance with the designs of long-term City Architect Alfred Herbert Foster (1873 – 23 March 1932). He joined the old City of Brisbane in 1913 as an Architectural Assistant to the City Engineer, and was made City Architect upon the formation of the greater Brisbane City Council. Harold Austen Erwood (c. 1884 – 1947) was Foster's long term assistant and successor, working as an Architect with Foster at the old City of Brisbane, from 1914, then at the greater Brisbane City Council after 1925, until Foster's death in 1932. Erwood had to wait to be appointed City Architect however, and was still waiting in August 1932. BCC finally changed his designation from Chief Architectural Assistant to Chief Architect on 30 April 1933. Reyburn Jameson (c. 1880 – 1950) was employed as an assistant architect from 1926 to 1929. South African born Jameson was previously employed as a draftsman by CEL from 1918 to 1920 and the City of Brisbane from 1921 to 1922. All three men appear to have been made Registered Architects from 14 June 1929, when the Architects Registration Act 1929 was enacted.

The substation buildings near or in residential areas were designed by Foster to fit in with residential areas, with similar designs employed by his successor Erwood.

Details of the brick building substations by Foster and Erwood are below.

Name	Original No	Post 1963 No	Details
Kedron	2	202	Designed by Erwood. No longer existing, replaced by a later operational 33 kV Substation.
Victoria Park	4	204	Designed by Foster. Existing, Local Heritage listed Substation (Decommissioned)
Hamilton	5	205	No longer existing, replaced by a later Local Heritage listed Substation.
Lang Park	6	206	Designed by Foster. No longer existing.
Victoria St, Woolloongabba	9	209	Designed by Foster? No longer existing.
Main Ave, Coorparoo	10	210	Designed by Jameson. Existing, State Heritage listed Substation (Decommissioned by 1977).
Cairns St, Kangaroo Point	11	211	Designed by Foster. Existing, Local Heritage listed Substation (Decommissioned by 1995).
Balmoral	12	212	Original building designed by Foster and later expanded by Erwood. Existing, and operational local Heritage listed Substation (minor network role only).
Moorooka	13	213	Original building (then called Stephens) designed by Foster. The site was expanded in 1942 to incorporate a 2nd building by Frank Gibson Costello. Existing, and operational local Heritage listed Substation.
Holland Park	30	230	Designed by Erwood. No longer existing, demolished and replaced by operational 33 kV substation.
Toowong	31	231	Designed by Erwood. No longer existing, demolished and replaced by operational 33 kV substation.
Nundah	37	237	Designed by Erwood. Existing, and operational local heritage listed substation, later upgraded to 33 kV.
Newmarket	38	238	Designed by Erwood. It was possibly his last substation as 39 & 40 were by Frank Costello. Existing, and operational local heritage listed substation, later upgraded to 33 kV.

Half of the interwar period brick substation buildings in the table above no longer exist, some have been replaced by newer substations that have been heritage listed. These substations were constructed to take supply from the New Farm Powerhouse, and when BCC constructed the new Tennyson Powerhouse, the 11 kV substations lost their importance, with the new Tennyson 33 kV network and Zone Substations taking over their role. BCC had been having voltage drop problems, and while initially they installed 11 kV feeder regulators with tap changers on the edge of the network, including Toowong substation, the new 33 kV network was able to resolve this problem.

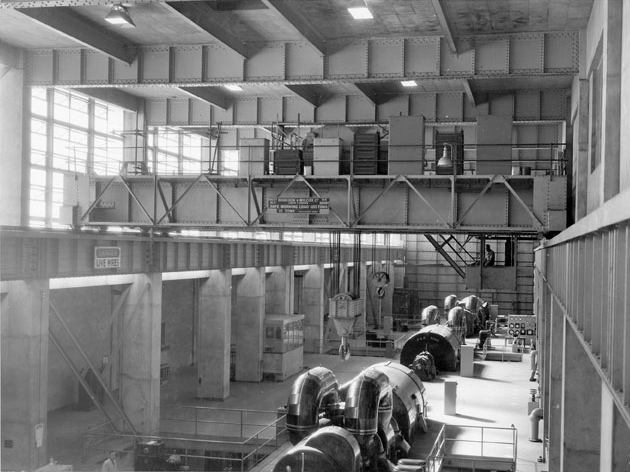
Turbines at the Tennyson Powerhouse, 1959

Erwood designed Kedron, Hamilton, Toowong and Holland Park Substations, which no longer exist. His remaining examples are the Nundah and Newmarket Substations, and while both the original brick buildings survive, both sites have been expanded and upgraded to 33 kV/11 kV zone substations. Kedron Substation site is still in use as a 33 kV zone substation, but Erwoods's original building, built c. 1933 was designed to take underground 11 kV supply from the New Farm Powerhouse. Kedron Substation was also where the BCC's 33 kV transmission line to Somerset dam originated, which was constructed on-site about the same time as the substation. A photo of the site was taken in 1950 with the new enclosed 33 kV building and the old 11 kV building side by side. Similarly, there is another 1935 photo of the original Holland Park Substation.

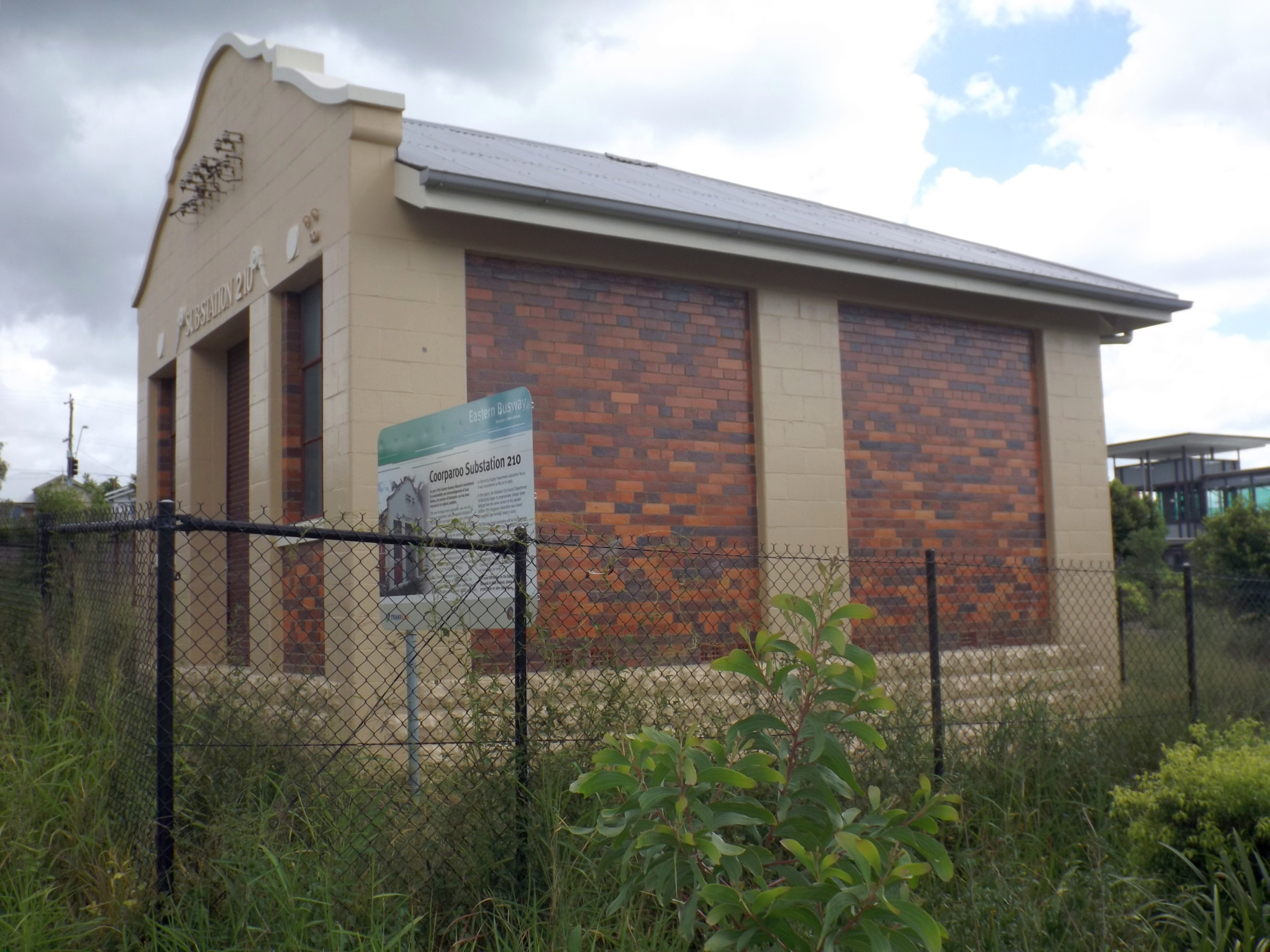
Coorparoo Substation No. 210 was added to the Queensland Heritage Register on 1 August 2005.

The old Coorparoo Street Lighting Substation, located at Main Avenue, Coorparoo was constructed in May 1930 for the new 'Series' system street lighting. While there were already three 5 kV street lighting substation buildings, Coorparoo Substation (No. 10) was the first BCC 11 kV public lighting substation building, and by 1940, there were three such buildings. Coorparoo Substation was fed from the old Woolloongabba (No.9) Substation with 11 kV, which it then converted to 5 kV. The 'series' system was replaced by the 'parallel' system of street lighting by 1965, with the last of the 'series' system removed by 1977, with the Coorparoo Substation (No. 10) made redundant and decommissioned. The plans for the substation were signed by Reyburn Jameson (rather than Foster) which is perhaps why, unlike the other substation, it is made out of 200mm concrete blocks, the only pre-World War II Brisbane substation to be built of such materials. The site is still owned by Brisbane City Council, and has become far more visible from Old Cleveland Road, with the construction of the Eastern Busway in 2011, resulting in the demolition of homes between the substation and Old Cleveland Road, giving a much clearer views of the building from that road, as well as Main Avenue. The demolition of the Bowls Club for the Eastern Busway also resulted in the building becoming far more prominent with much more clear space around the site.

The interwar BCC 11 kV substation buildings have "a landmark quality due to its picturesque design, which was the result of a decision by the City Architect of the period, A.H. Foster, to limit the visual impact of Electrical Supply Department substations in residential areas by drawing on contemporary domestic architecture. The small industrial building reflects the prestige that the BCC associated with its electrification drive of the late 1920s and 1930s".

This style of substation was discontinued from 1940 with the dismissal of Erwood, when a new Council was elected, although the differing priorities brought by World War II had already effectively meant that the Newmarket Substation built in 1938 was the last of its kind. The next City Architect, Frank Costello would bring a very different style of substation building design, seen to be far more in keeping with the wishes of the newly elected Brisbane City Council, headed by John Beals Chandler as Mayor and with his Citizens' Municipal Organisation aligned Councillors. On 16 July 1940, it was reported that 5 Executive Officers of the council had been sacked, with Erwood one of them, after 26 years of service. Erwood was reported to have said: "In wartime anything is possible, but this came as a complete surprise to me".

== Establishing networks ==
=== Regional networks 1938-1963 ===
On 17 January 1938, the SECQ was established, and quickly began to strengthen CEL by actively ensuring that all the other electricity undertakings in South East Queensland were absorbed into the one entity. By 1940, CEL had acquired the generating and distribution assets at Ipswich, Southport, Nambour, Coolangatta, Gympie, Redcliffe, Boonah, Beaudesert and Highfields, and the Tweed Shire in northern New South Wales. This created a situation where the two electricity providers in South East Queensland were the BCC and CEL. The two systems were connected in 1940 as a wartime contingency.

The SECQ commissioned construction of transmission lines to Kilcoy, from Townsville to Stuart, Dalby to Jandowae and Cairns to Mossman in 1938, and encouraged the Maroochy Shire Council to connect Maroochydore to the CEL north coast 33 kV line then under construction to Nambour via Caboolture, Woodford, Maleny and Mapleton. Goomeri was connected to Murgon in 1940, and the north coast transmission line reached Gympie in 1943. Despite the materials shortages experienced during WW2, the length of transmission lines constructed in Queensland by 1945 had increased 88% to 771 km, supplying nearly 48,000 customers.

During this period a private power station was established at Yarraman in 1939, and operated until 1954 when that town was connected to the transmission network, this being the last private power generator of the pioneering era.

In 1946, the SECQ announced plans to construct three regional power stations at Howard (on a coalfield near Maryborough), Rockhampton and Townsville, to supply regional networks centred on those locations. The power stations opened in 1951, 1952 and 1953 respectively. Nanango was connected to Kingaroy in 1948, both being supplied by the Howard power station upon its opening in 1951. The interconnection of the Darling Downs area from Toowoomba also commenced in 1946, with Stanthorpe and Killarney connected that year, Pittsworth and Millmerran the following year, Acland in 1948 and Goombungee in 1949, the supply to the Darling Downs area being boosted with the construction of the first 110 kV line from the CEL network to Postmans Ridge (near Toowoomba) in 1950.

In 1953, the SECQ was regionalised, with the Southern Electricity Authority (SEA) immediately acquiring CEL and installing Queensland's first peak load power stations, both 10 MW units, at Abermain (on a coalfield north of Ipswich) and on the site of the Tennyson Power Station, then under construction by the Brisbane City Council. CEL had also been constructing a new power station, Bulimba B, which opened the following year, and it together with the Tennyson station which opened in 1955 significantly eased the post-war power shortages that had seen frequent brown-outs, load shedding by industries and staggered work hours introduced to alleviate that situation.

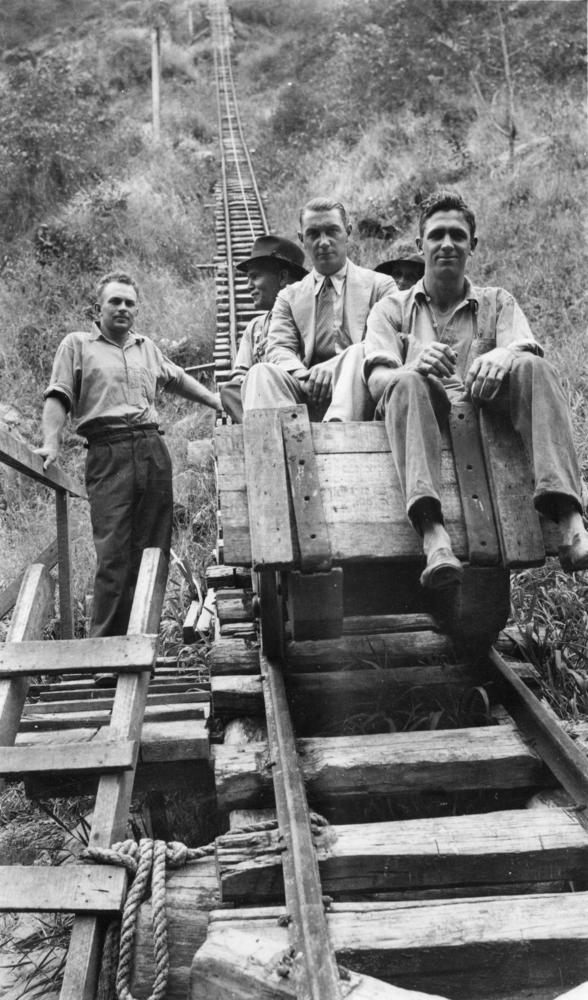
Access tramway used for the construction of the Barron Gorge Hydroelectric Power Station, ~1935

In the far north of the state, expansion of electricity generation capacity in the Cairns region was determined to be more economically achieved by hydro-electric schemes, as the cost of shipping coal to Cairns was significant. The Kareeya Hydro Power Station was commissioned in 1957, and the Barron Gorge power station was significantly expanded in 1963. At Mt Isa, the first stage of the Mica Creek Power Station was commissioned in 1960, coal being transported there as a 'back load' in wagons used to haul metal ingots from the smelter to Townsville that would otherwise be empty on the return journey. This continued until the station converted to burn gas in 2000.

By this stage most towns with a population greater than 1,000 had an electricity supply, and in recognition of the needs of smaller and more remote communities, the Queensland Government introduced the 'Local Powerhouse Scheme', whereby it would subsidise 67% of the cost of a local power supply to towns with a population of >250. Powerhouses opened in Charleville, Augathella, Quilpie, Aramac and Muttaburra in 1952 under this scheme, as did Jericho's in 1953 and those in Morven, Tambo, Bollon, Yuleba, Baralaba, Capella, Kilkivan and Texas in 1954. 1955 saw Injune, Wyandra, Normanton and Cooktown's powerhouses opened, with Wandoan's opening in 1956 and those in Boulia and Yelarbon opening in 1957, the last town supplied under the scheme being Jundah in 1959.

Network expansion continued in more closely settled areas, with Bribie Island, Emu Park and Yeppoon connected in 1953, Monto and Giru the following year, Mt Larcom and Magnetic Island in 1955, Charters Towers and Cardwell in 1956 and Miriam Vale, Mossman and Port Douglas in 1957. In 1958 Cairns was connected to Townsville by Queensland's first 132 kV interconnector, and the last use of DC power was changed to AC in Toowoomba. The Murwillumbah power station closed in 1960, with the Tweed Shire's power supply coming from Queensland from that time. In 1961 the Roma power station converted to gas, the first significant use of this fuel in Queensland.

The Local Powerhouse Scheme showed the problems of isolated systems, as demand often outstripped capacity shortly after opening, with generating capacity needing to be doubled or tripled in some cases. Interconnection was the long-term solution, and Aramac was connected to Barcaldine, with Augathella connected to Charleville, both in 1961, heralding the future.

=== A Statewide network 1963-1988 ===
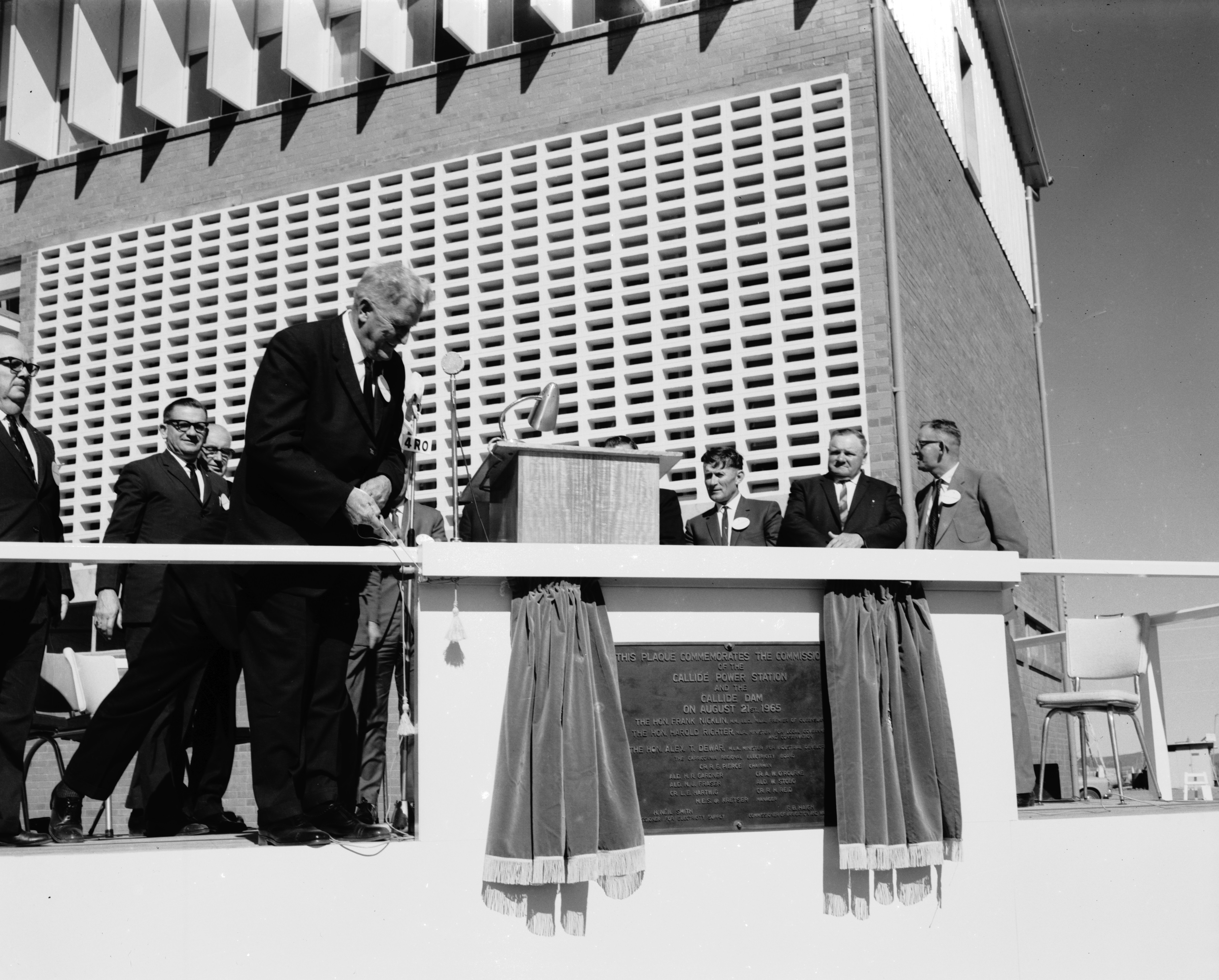
Premier Frank Nicklin opening Callide Power Station, 21 August 1965

An interconnector between Mackay and Townsville opened in 1963, and the following year the commissioning of the north coast – Howard interconnector created a north–south network extending ~1800 km from Mossman to Murwullimbah. Western extension then commenced, with Winton connected to Hughenden in 1968.

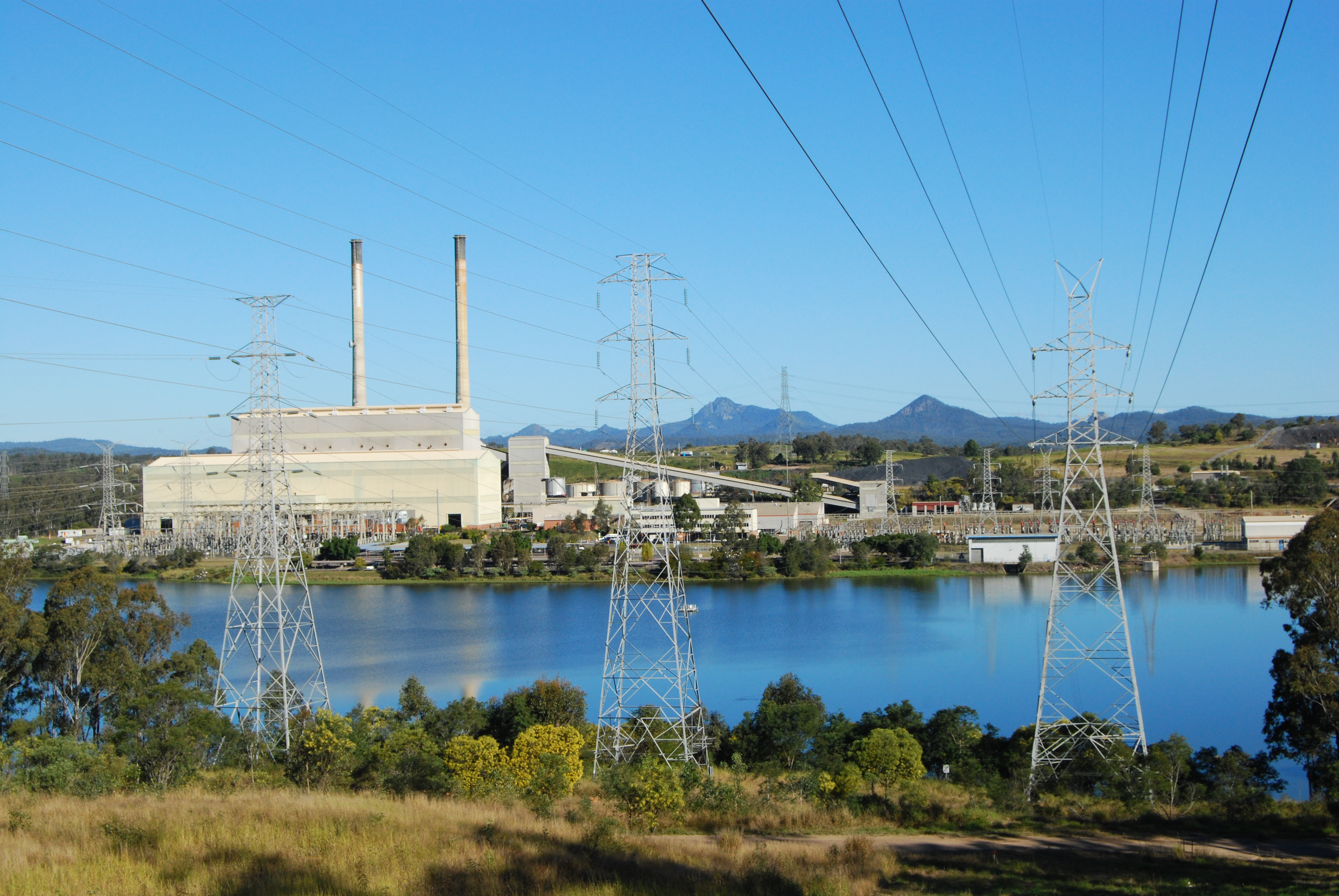
Swanbank Power Station, 2009

A significant factor in the growth of the state's electricity demand from the 1960s was the rapid growth in the mining sector, and power stations were built on coalfields to service the demand, including Callide Power Station in 1965, Swanbank Power Station in 1967 and Collinsville Power Station in 1968. Queensland's first gas turbine peak supply power stations were built at Middle Ridge near Toowoomba (56 MW) and at Swanbank (28 MW) in 1969, joined by a 32 MW plant at Mackay commissioned in 1975. This new capacity enabled the New Farm Power Station and the Abermain and Tennyson peak stations to be decommissioned in 1971.

1975 also saw Queensland's first 275 kV transmission line opened from the Callide station to Brisbane, the same year power was connected to one of the last settlements without an electricity supply, Karara and its 33 customers.

The following year the first unit of the Gladstone Power Station was commissioned, and this base load station remains the largest by capacity in the state. This enabled the decommissioning of the Howard, Rockhampton and Townsville power stations by 1980.

Another base load station was commissioned at Tarong in 1984, the year the Wivenhoe pumped storage hydro-electric station opened in conjunction with the commissioning of a new water supply dam near Brisbane. This additional capacity enabled the decommissioning of the Bulimba power station in 1986.

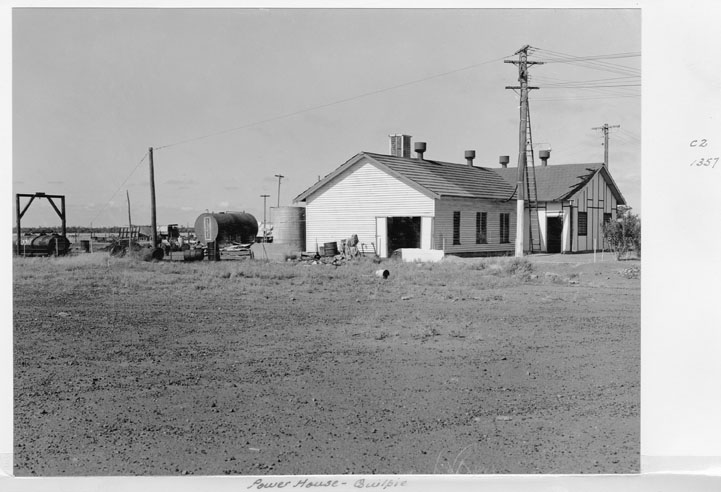
Quilpie Powerhouse, 1955

Network transmission lines reached Barcaldine and Longreach in 1985, Roma (from Tarong power station) in 1986, St George, Charleville and Quilpie in 1987, and Cunnamulla in 1988. As if to complete the circle of history, a 22 kV transmission line was also commissioned to Thargomindah in 1988, ensuring that settlement continues to be able to claim the record of being the longest provider of a supply of electricity for public purposes in Queensland anywhere outside Brisbane.

=== Brisbane substation development ===
On 24 February 1941, a 38-year-old Sydney-based architect Frank G. Costello was appointed as the new City Architect. Costello had a completely different style of substation building, creating a much more utilitarian building, very different to his predecessors.

One of the substations he constructed was at Dudley Street, Annerley (Photo of Annerley Substation, taken 8 February 1952). Another was an upgrade of Moorooka (formerly called Stephens) Substation, with the photo taken in 1949 , Brisbane City Council.

Costello, later became the overall Town Planning and Building Department Manager, when the Town Planner, R.A. McInnes left Council. With the end of the Chandler administration in 1952, Costello himself was fired along with seven other executive officers (including his deputy), C.A. Hamilton on 7 July 1952. Costello went on to work for a private firm immediately after his dismissal. Controversy was caused, when an engineer was called in to act in the role of City Architect, after Costello's successor in the Town Planning and Building Department Manager role, Mr. L.U.C. Kempster departed in 1954 (as the former Town Clerk of the old Sandgate Town Council, Kempster was the last of the former town clerks to still be work at Brisbane City Council). The purge of the section saw most of the staff working on the then proposed town plan sacked, including many of the remaining qualified architects with the last remaining senior architect departing in 1953.

=== Brisbane City Council as Distributor ===
The New Farm Powerhouse was owned by the Brisbane City Council until it was sold in 1963 to the Southern Electricity Authority and then decommissioned in 1971.

=== Other Local authorities ===
Initially, the many local authorities raised funds, and provided supply for their own areas in whatever way they could.

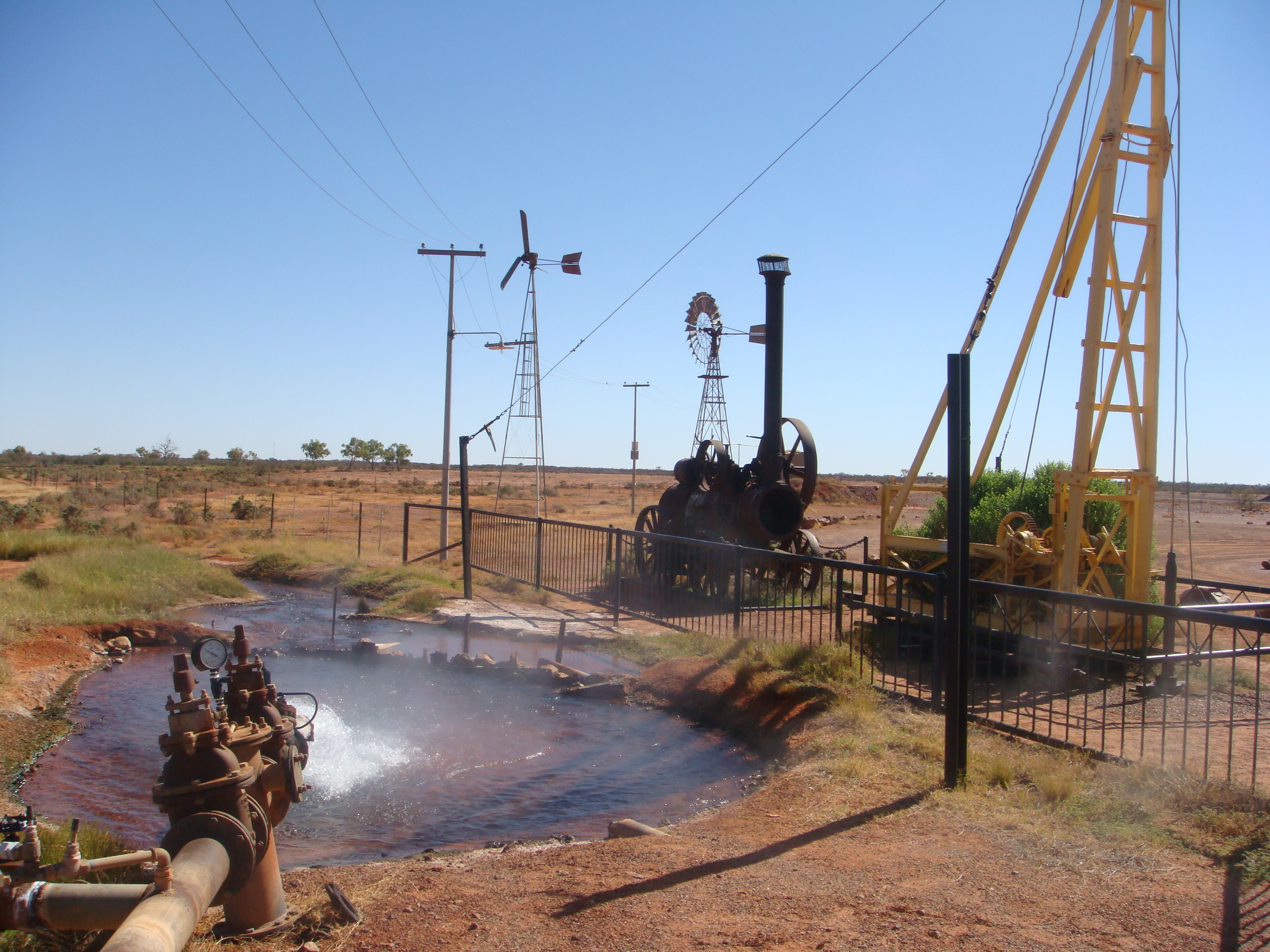
The hydroelectric bore at Thargomindah in 2008

In far western Thargomindah, late in the 19th century, the civic fathers set up the first natural gas powered generating station in the world. Electricity for lighting was also generated from the pressure of artesian water bores. The use of bore water at Thargomindah has been described as Australia's first hydro-electricity scheme and operated until 1951.

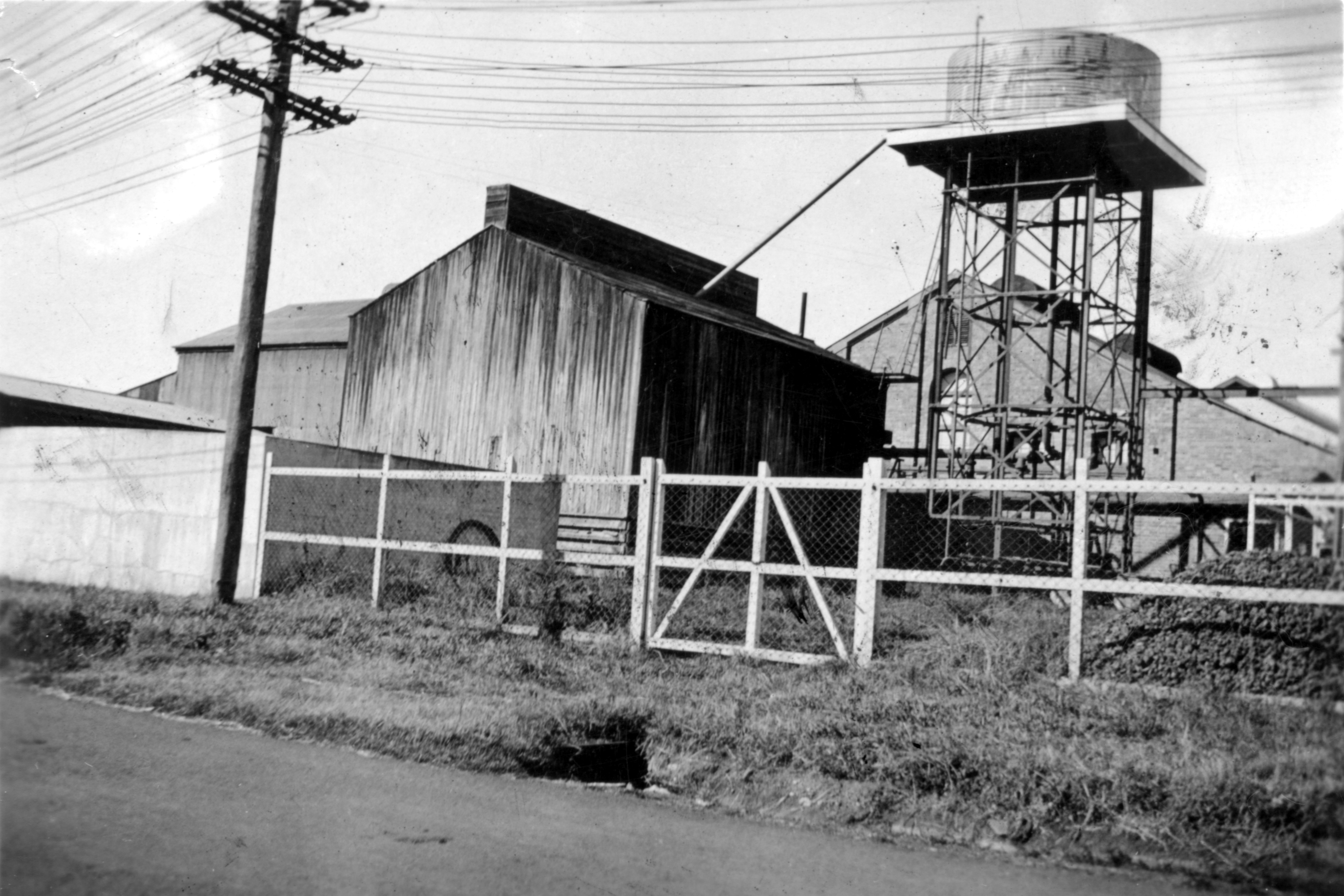
Toowoomba Powerhouse, ~1930s

After Thargomindah, Charters Towers received electricity supply in 1897, Rockhampton in 1898, Toowoomba in 1905, Warwick in 1912 and Ayr was supplied in 1914. A number of coal mine in the Ipswich district were generating electricity by the early 1900s.

Later, in Dalby, on the Darling Downs a much larger suction gas engine was installed in a power house by Myall Creek to supply the town. Other local authorities, one by one, set up generation stations using various types of diesel engines. The station in Tara used horizontal single cylinder heavy diesel fuel engines with drip lubrication. Others used more familiar types.

The power station in Roma was first set up using Ruston & Hornsby and Blackstone and Mirrlees 12 and 16 cylinder diesel engines. As demand grew, a turbine modified from a 707 jet engine was installed to supplement peak load. When the Roma gas fields were developed, all these engines were modified to run on dual fuel. When the gas flow was sufficient for the engines' needs, they ran on natural gas, but when the flow faltered, as it often did, the engines would automatically convert to burning diesel distillate.

In the major metropolitan areas of Brisbane, Gold Coast and Toowoomba, private companies provided supply and this continued into the 1950s. But the State Government then took a hand, dividing responsibility for electricity supply for the state amongst three Electricity Supply Authorities, Southern, Central and Northern. These basically covered the high population areas of the east coast, leaving supply in the west in the hands of the various local councils.

=== Southern Electric Authority of Queensland ===
The Government of Queensland decided that there should be one electrical authority for South East Queensland in 1961. The Southern Electric Authority of Queensland (SEAQ), absorbed not only the City Electric Light Company which supplied Brisbane and the Gold Coast, but also Toowoomba Electric Light and Power Company, which also covered some areas west of the Great Dividing Range. The new authority was considered a major step forward in electrical progress. Its establishment prepared the way forward for future amalgamation of power supply in South East Queensland. The Brisbane City Council's Department of Electricity continued to supply the Brisbane City suburban area, but not the inner city area. This meant that the City Council's Newfarm power station was in the Southern Electric Authorities' area of supply and the Southern Electric Authorities' Swanbank power station was in the City Council's area of supply.

A new order commenced with the Electricity Act of 1976, under which a series of regional Electricity Boards were set up replacing the three Electricity Authorities from 1 July 1977. These Boards were under the umbrella of the State Electricity Commission of Queensland, which assumed the major generation and transmission responsibilities in 1938 after the Queensland Government's Royal Commission on Generation and Distribution of Electric Power in Queensland, 1936 was conducted to review electricity supply in the state. Governing Board members this time included State Government representative members, local councillors, and prominent business people. Under this new set-up, responsibility for electricity distribution from the ranges east of Toowoomba to the South Australian border was given to the South West Queensland Electricity Board (SWQEB), and the eight separate local council power stations were handed over to the Board's control. In 1945, the South East Queensland Electricity Board (SEQEB), Wide Bay–Burnett Electricity Board (WBBEB), Capricornia Electricity Board (CAPELEC), Mackay Electricity Board (formerly Mackay Region Electricity Board MREB), North Queensland Electricity Board (NORQEB) and the Far North Queensland Electricity Board (FNQEB) were also established to distribute electricity in their respective regions. This marked the first attempt to coordinate electricity supply outside of South East Queensland.

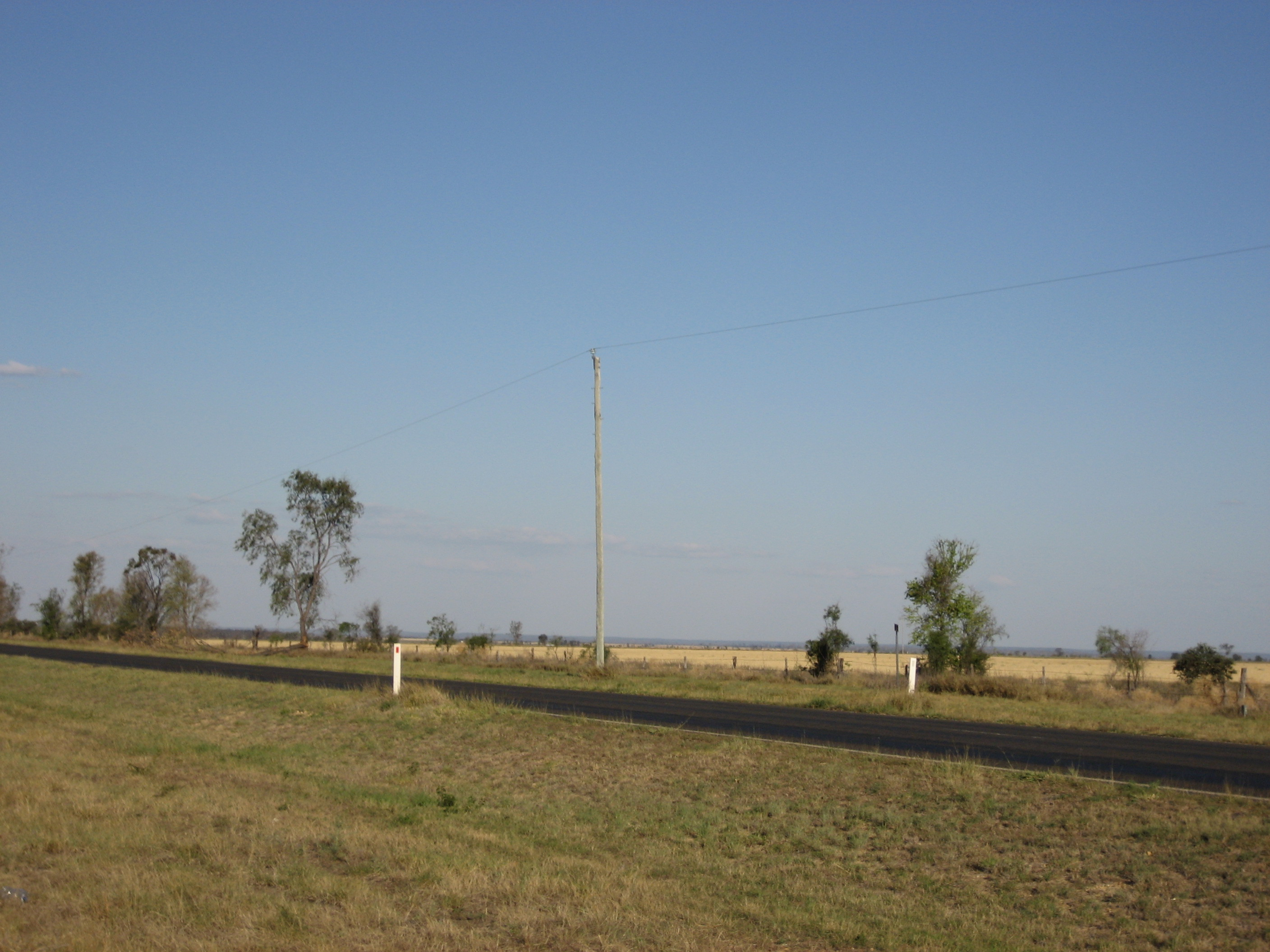
A single-wire earth return power line near Emerald, 2007

During this time the effort to supply remote properties led to the pioneering of a different means of supply – Single-wire earth return (SWER) lines were set up reaching many thousands of miles and many hundreds of outlying properties with reliable electricity supplies for the first time. Because of the de-centralisation of government departments in Queensland, the headquarters for the SWQEB was established at Dalby, with that region's power house, operating systems, and customer billing taken over immediately. The electricity facilities of the seven surrounding council areas were gradually absorbed, but meter reading and customer billing in each of these continued for some time as local operations. Customer billing for the area covered by the SWQEB that was formerly within the SEAQ was administered on a bureau basis by SEQEB, which was based in Brisbane.

== Modernisation and Restructure ==
The transfer was not without problems: when the transfer of customer billing for Toowoomba, Warwick, and Stanthorpe the Board's new computers failed totally, the Board was sacked and replaced with an administrator, Peter Thorley, with SEQEB's General Manager and Secretary forced to work with Thornley to solve the problem. Although Thornley departed to become administrator of the sacked Melbourne City Council before a solution was found, he established teams to work on individual aspects of the issue, which were making progress. A new board was appointed, and after some staff reorganisation, was able to pull the teams' work together and produce accounts which passed the Auditor General's scrutiny for the first time in several years.

During this time, the generation and transmission portions of the Queensland Electricity Commission were separated into two separate bodies, and high voltage transmission lines were built all the way west to Charleville, Cunnamulla, Quilpie, Thargomindah and beyond. In the remote areas beyond the Grey Range, some stand alone generation stations were set up similar to those already operating in remote northern aboriginal communities. Another restructure of the state's electricity supply saw the abolishment of the multiple Boards, with Energex replacing the SEQEB, and Ergon set up for the rest of the state. This represented a major departure from the previous decentralised nature of the industry, with Ergon's headquarters transferring to Brisbane. The former SWQEB headquarters in Dalby was gradually de-populated, and eventually purchased by Western Downs Regional Council. It was refurbished to become the council's headquarters and was officially opened in October 2011.

=== Electricity generation expansion and diversification 1988-2000 ===
Queensland's population has grown at an annual rate of ~2% since the 1970s, and to meet the commensurate increase in demand for electricity during this period the Callide B base load station (700 MW) was commissioned in 1988, and the Stanwell Power Station (1448 MW) in 1993. The growing use of air-conditioning increased the need for peak demand generating capacity, and gas turbines were commissioned at Barcaldine in 1995, Ballera (near Mt Isa) the following year, Mt Stuart (near Townsville) and Cannington (near Mt Isa) in 1998 and Roma in 1999, the same year the Koombooloomba Hydro-Electric Power Station (west of Cairns) was commissioned.

In 1997, the electricity sector was restructured in preparation for the implementation of the National Electricity Market (NEM). Queensland became connected to the national grid via the main New South Wales transmission system on 14 February 2001, enabling the export of up to 1380 MW or the import of up to 880 MW of electricity.

=== Diversity of supply 2000–present ===
Approximately 75% of the growth in generating capacity in Australia since the creation of the NEM has been in Queensland, from both traditional and recently developed energy sources. The nameplate capacity of power stations in the state has risen from ~8,400 MW to ~14,750 MW during this period, a 58% increase.

The state's first significant wind farm opened at the appropriately named Windy Hill in 2000, and a number of sugar mills that use bagasse as a fuel have become suppliers to the NEM, including the Racecourse (48 MW) mill near Mackay and Invicta (50 MW) and Pioneer (69 MW) mills near Townsville. Several mines with their own generating plants now supply the NEM, some using coal seam gas as the fuel. Methane gas extracted from land fills is also used in a minor capacity, as are other biofuels.

New coal fired base load stations have opened at Callide C (2001), Millmerran (2002), Tarong (2003) and Kogan Creek (2007), the latter being the largest single generator in Australia.

Gas fired base load stations have opened at Oakey (2000), Swanbank (2002), Yabulu (near Townsville, 2004), Braemar (2006), Darling Downs and Condamine (both 2010) and Diamantina (2014).

This additional capacity has enabled the decommissioning of the Swanbank A & D power stations in 2005 and 2003 respectively.

Peak load capacity has also expanded in this period, with a total of seven facilities being commissioned or connected to the grid, with a combined capacity of ~290 MW.

== See also ==
- Energy in Queensland
- History of Queensland
- History of electricity supply in Brisbane
- List of power stations in Queensland
