= List of power stations in Queensland =

Location of power stations in Queensland
Coal, gas, hydroelectric, biomass
Cities

This is a list of active power stations in Queensland, Australia. Candidates for this list must already be commissioned and capable of generating 1 MW or more of electricity. Queensland has a diverse range of power generating types.

== Coal fired ==
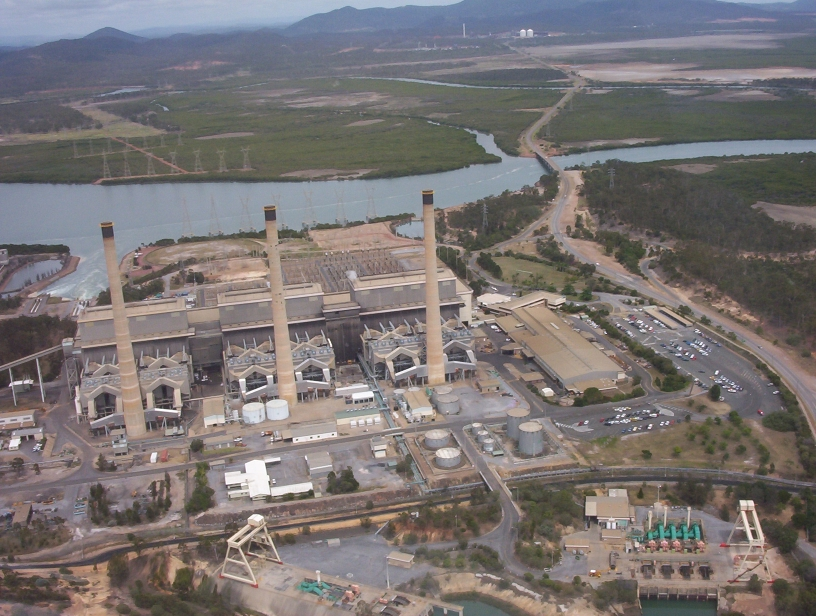
Gladstone Power Station, Queensland's largest power station

These fossil fuel power stations burn coal to power steam turbines that generate some or all of the electricity they produce.

Power station	Max. capacity (MW)	Turbines	Coal type	Conveyance	Mine type	Cooling water	Commission year	Refs
Callide B	700	2	bituminous	conveyor	open cut	fresh	1988	
Callide C	810	2	bituminous	conveyor	open cut	fresh	2001	
Gladstone	1680	6	bituminous	rail	open cut	seawater	1976	
Kogan Creek	750	1	bituminous	conveyor	open cut	dry cooled	2007	
Millmerran	852	2	bituminous	conveyor	open cut	dry cooled	2002	
Stanwell	1445	4	bituminous	rail	open cut	fresh	1996	
Tarong	1400	4	bituminous	conveyor	open cut	fresh	1986	
Tarong North	443	1	bituminous	conveyor	open cut	fresh	2003	

- Gladstone is scheduled for closure in March 2029, brought forward from its original scheduled closure in 2035.
- Tarong was scheduled for closure in 2032 but has been extended to at least 2037 under the Queensland Energy Roadmap.
- Callide B was scheduled for closure in 2028 but has been extended to at least 2031 under the Queensland Energy Roadmap.
- Stanwell scheduled for closure in 2046.

== Gas turbine ==
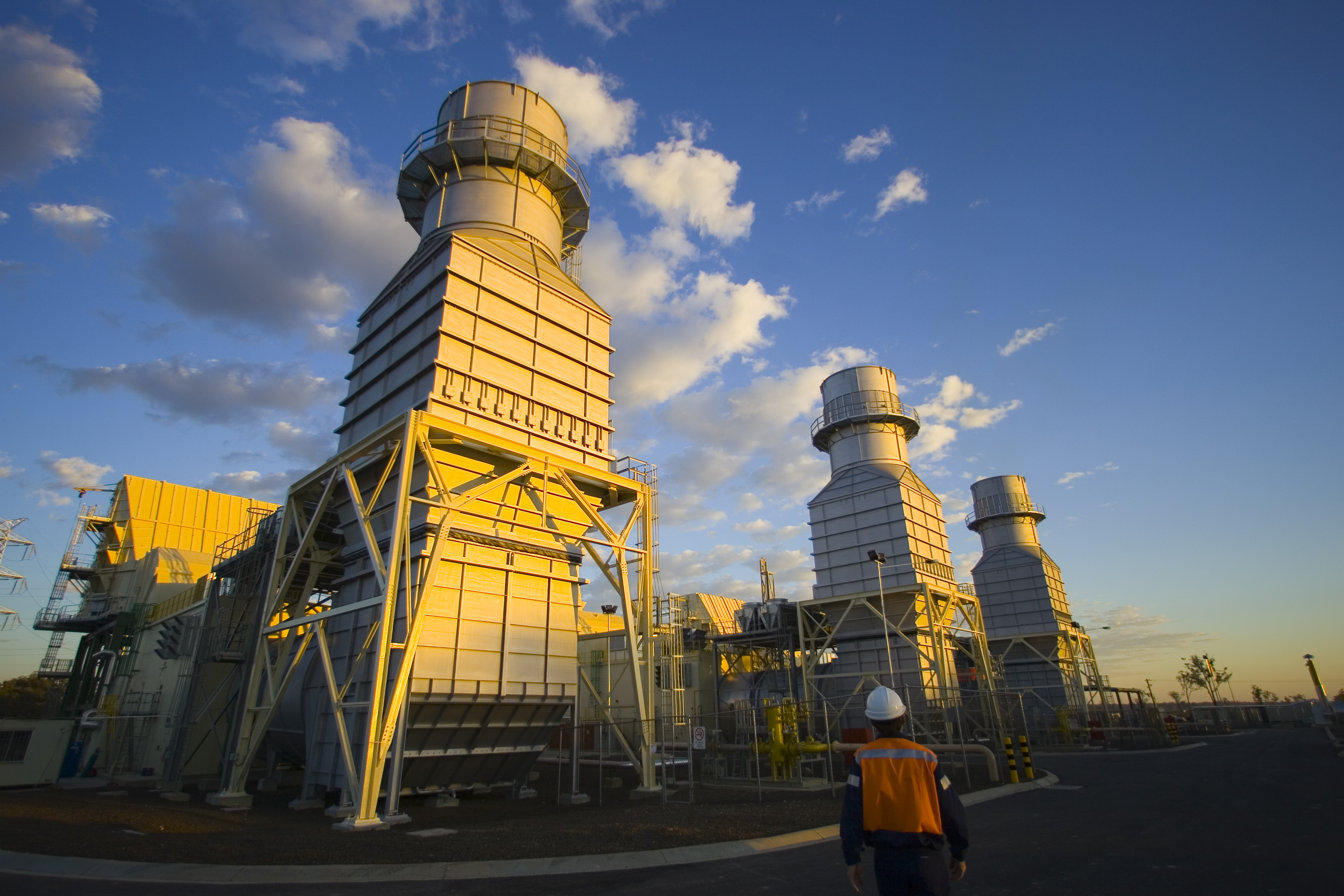
Braemar Power Station, 2006

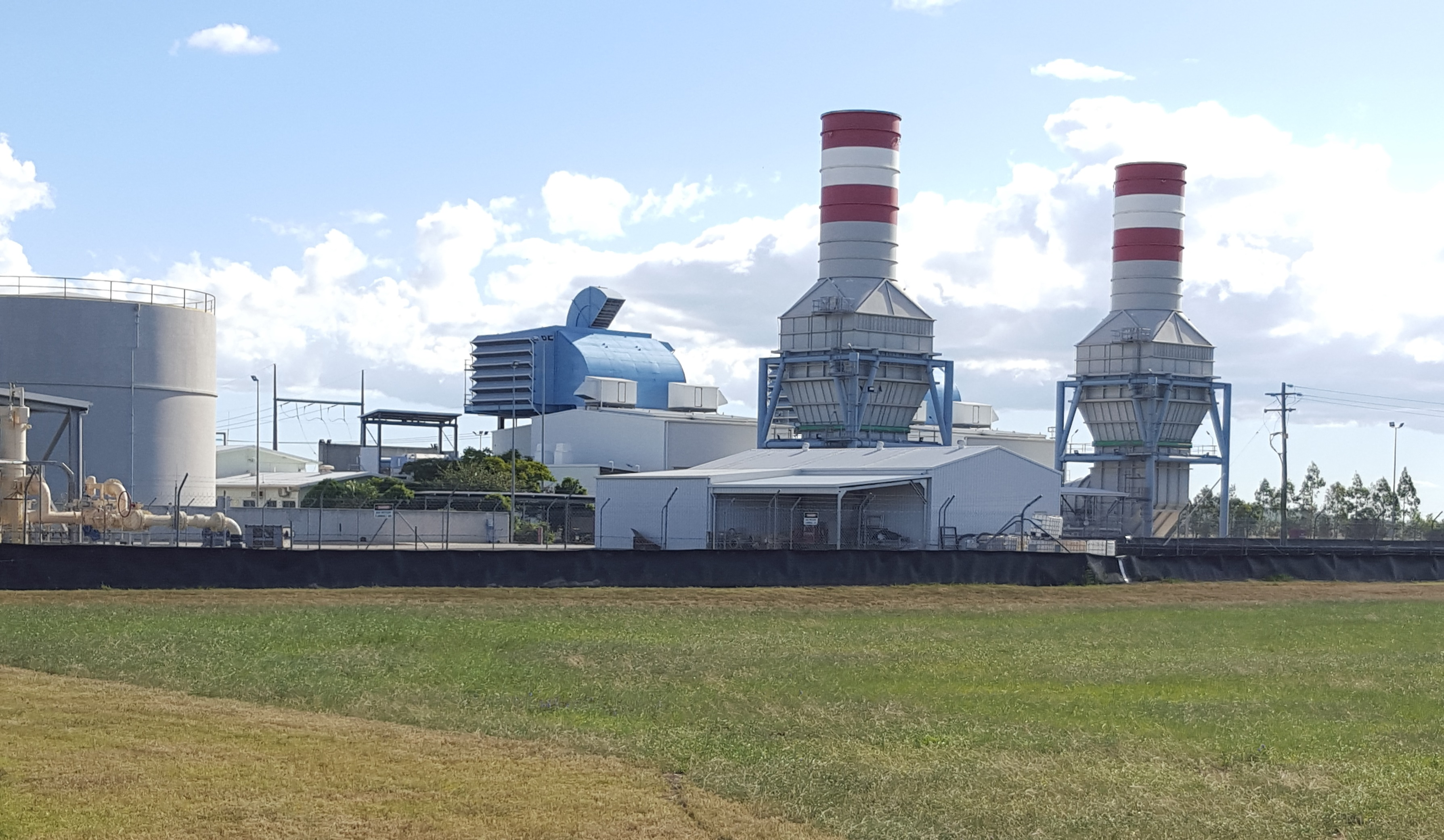
Oakey Power Station, 2016

These gas turbine power stations use gas combustion to generate some or all of the electricity they produce. Combined cycle plants include an open cycle gas turbine, plus a heat recovery steam generator that uses waste heat from the gas turbine to make steam to drive a steam turbine.

Power station	Max. capacity (MW)	Turbines	Fuel type	Cycle	Refs
Barcaldine	55	2	natural gas	Combined	
Braemar	502	3	coal seam gas	Open	
Bulwer Island, BP Refining	32	3	coal seam gas	Combined	
Condamine	144	3	coal seam gas	Combined	
Darling Downs	630	4	coal seam gas	Combined	
Diamantina	242	4 (gas) 2 (steam)	coal seam gas	Combined	
Leichhardt	60	1	coal seam gas	Open	
Mackay Gas Turbine	34	1	oil	Open	
Mica Creek	318	12	natural gas	Combined	
Mount Stuart	414	3	diesel	Open	
Oakey	282	2	natural gas / diesel	Open	
Phosphate Hill	42	9	natural gas	Combined	
Roma	80	2	natural gas	Open	
Swanbank E	385	1	natural gas/coal seam gas	Combined	
Tarong Gas Turbine	15	1	diesel	Open	
Townsville	242	2	natural gas / coal seam gas	Combined	
Yarwun	180	1		Combined	

== Gas (reciprocating) ==
These power stations use gas combustion in reciprocating engines to generate some or all of the electricity they produce.

Power station	Max. capacity (MW)	Engines	Fuel type
Browns Plains	2.18	2	landfill gas
Cannington, BHP Minerals	40.06	22	natural gas / diesel
Condamine	3	1	coal seam gas
Coominya, AFC Abattoirs	1.73	3	natural gas
Daandine	33	11	coal seam gas
Luggage Point, Myrtletown	3	2	sewage gas
Middlemount	45	20	coal seam gas
Moranbah	45	15	coal seam gas
Mt Isa XPS41	47.5	19	natural gas
Rochedale	3.3	3	landfill gas
Roghan Road	1.95	1	landfill gas
Stapylton	1	1	landfill gas
Suntown, Arundel	1	1	landfill gas
Swanbank B	7	1	landfill gas
Thompson Power Station	24	8	natural gas
Whitwood Road	1.1	1	landfill gas
Molendinar	0.7	1	landfill gas

== Hydroelectric ==
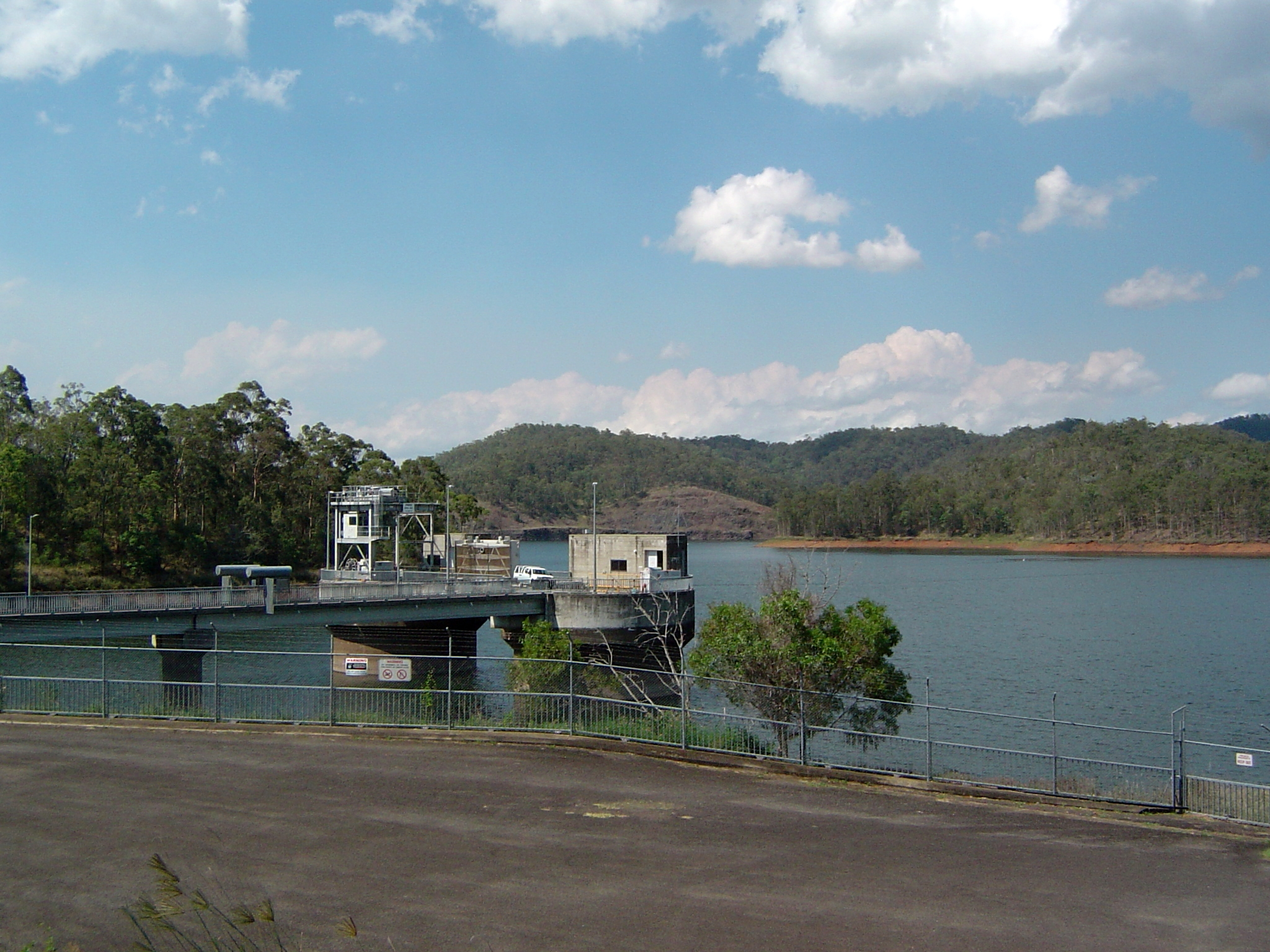
Splityard Creek Dam is part of Wivenhoe Power Station.

These hydroelectric power stations use the flow of water to generate some or all of the electricity they produce.

Power station	Max. capacity (MW)	Turbines	Pumped storage
Barron Gorge	66	2	no
Kareeya	88	4	no
Kareeya 5	7	1	no
Somerset Dam	3.2	1	no
Tinaroo Falls Dam	1.6	1	no
Wivenhoe	500	2	yes
Wivenhoe Small Hydro	4.7	1	no

== Wind farms ==
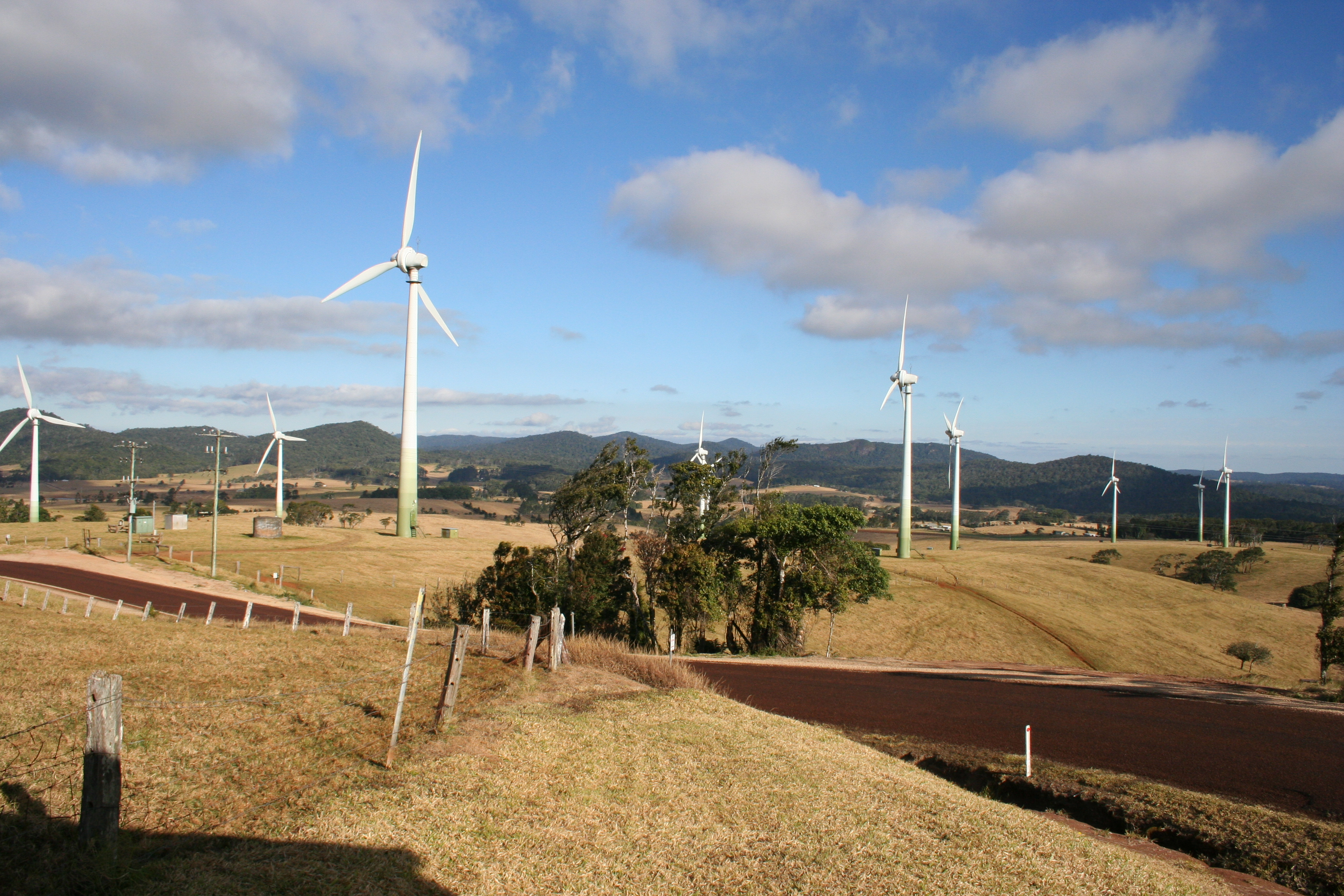
Windy Hill Wind Farm, 2007

These wind farms use the power of wind to turn wind turbines to generate all of the electricity they produce.

Power station	Max. capacity (MW)	Turbines
Thursday Island	0.45	2
Mount Emerald Wind Farm	180	53
Windy Hill Wind Farm	12	20
Coopers Gap Wind Farm	453	123

== Solar ==
These power stations convert light into electricity using the photovoltaic effect.

Power station	Max. capacity (MW)
Barcaldine Remote Community Solar Farm	25
Clare Solar Farm	100
Clermont Solar Farm	75
Collinsville Power Station	42
Darling Downs Solar Farm	110
Daydream Solar Farm	180
Emerald Solar Park	68
Gatton Solar Research Facility	3.275
Hamilton Solar Farm	69
Haughton Solar Farm	100
Hayman Solar Farm	60
Kidston Solar Project	50
Lakeland Solar Farm	10.8
Lilyvale Solar Farm	100
Mica Creek Solar Farm	88
Normanton Solar Farm	5
Ross River Solar Farm	148
Sun Metals Solar Farm	150
Sunshine Coast Solar Farm	15
Susan River Solar Farm	75
University of Queensland Solar	1.22
Weipa Solar Farm	1.7
Whitsunday Solar Farm	69

== Biomass combustion ==
These power stations burn biomass (biofuel) to generate some or all of the electricity they produce.

Power station	Max. capacity (MW)	Turbines	Fuel type	Conveyance
Babinda Sugar Mill, decommissioned	0	1	bagasse	on-site
Bingera Sugar Mill, Bundaberg Sugar	5	2	bagasse	on-site
Farleigh Mill, Mackay Sugar Ltd.	13	4	bagasse	on-site
Gympie Coffee Manufacturing, Nestlé	16	1	coffee grounds and sawdust	on-site
Inkerman Mill, Wilmar International	10	2	bagasse	on-site
Invicta Mill, Wilmar International	38.8	2	bagasse	on-site
Isis Central Sugar Mill	11.5	4	bagasse	on-site
Kalamia Mill, Wilmar International	9	1	bagasse	on-site
Macknade Mill, Wilmar International	8	2	bagasse	on-site
Marian Mill, Mackay Sugar Ltd.	18	3	bagasse	on-site
Maryborough Sugar Factory, MSF Sugar Ltd.	4.75	3	bagasse	on-site
Millaquin Sugar Mill, Bundaberg Sugar	5	3	bagasse	on-site
Mossman Central Mill decommissioned 2024, Mackay Sugar	11.85	5	bagasse	on-site
Mourilyan Sugar Mill, decommissioned	0	5	bagasse	on-site
Mulgrave Sugar Mill, MSF Sugar Ltd.	10.5	4	bagasse	on-site
Pioneer Mill, Wilmar International	68	2	bagasse	on-site
Pleystowe Mill, decommissioned	0	2	bagasse	on-site
Proserpine Sugar Mill, Wilmar International	20	4	bagasse	on-site
Racecourse Mill, Mackay Sugar Ltd.	13.8	2	bagasse	on-site
Rocky Point	30	1	bagasse, wood waste	on-site, road
Stapylton	5	1	wood waste	road
South Johnstone Mill, MSF Sugar Ltd.	19.3	3	bagasse	on-site
Suncoast Gold Macadamias	1.5	1	crop waste	on-site
Tableland Mill, MSF Sugar Ltd.	7	1	bagasse	on-site
Tully Sugar Mill	21.4	5	bagasse	on-site
Victoria Mill, Wilmar International	11.8	3	bagasse	on-site
Visy Paper, Brisbane	2	1	black liquor	on-site

== Battery storage ==
Name	Owner/operator	Storage (MWh)	Capacity (MW)	Units/Location	Energised	Fuel type
Supernode 1	Quinbrook	619	260	South Pine	2026	
Tarong	Stanwell	600	300		2026	coal
Western Downs	Neoen	540	270		2025	400 MW solar
Swanbank	CleanCo	500	250		2026	gas
Brendale	Akaysha	410	205	South Pine Sports Complex	2026	
Greenbank	CS Energy	400	200		2025	
Ulinda Park (Western Downs)	Akaysha	298	155		2025	

== See also ==
- Energy in Queensland
- History of electricity supply in Queensland
- List of power stations in Australia
