= Mica Creek Power Station =

- Country: Australia
- Location: Mount Isa, Queensland
- Coordinates: 20°46′40″S 139°29′26″E
- Status: Decommissioned
- Commission date: 1960
- Decommission date: 2021
- Owner: Stanwell Corporation

Thermal power station
- Primary fuel: Natural gas
- Turbine technology: Steam turbine and gas turbine
- Combined cycle?: 5 units

Power generation
- Units operational: 7
- Nameplate capacity: 216 MW

Mica Creek Power Station is located 5 km south of Mount Isa in north-west Queensland, Australia. It was natural gas powered with 12 turbines of various sizes that generate a combined capacity of 318 MW of electricity. The power station is owned by state government owned Stanwell Corporation.

Mica Creek was originally coal-fired, with conversion to natural gas completed in 2000. Gas is sourced from the Cooper Eromanga Basin gas field via the 840 km Carpentaria Pipeline.

Mica Creek supplied electricity to mining companies in the region, as well as Mount Isa, Cloncurry, and the nearby region.

== Current status ==
For more than 54 years, Mica Creek was the sole large-scale supplier of electricity to mining and residential communities in the State's north west.

In December 2014, a new power station was officially opened in Mount Isa. Customers of Mica Creek switched to the new power station when their power purchase agreements expired, with the exception of one mining customer. They will continue to receive power from Mica Creek until 2019.

At the end of 2014, the requirement for generation from Mica Creek was reduced to less than 100 MW, in line with the commissioning of Diamantina Power Station.

In December 2014, work began to put Mica Creek into a long-term configuration. The C1 and C2 units were placed in cold storage, leaving the power station with seven operational generating units.

The Mica Creek Power Station was officially shut down at 8.00am AEST on 1 January 2021 as the last of its contracts were completed. The Diamantina Power Station ramped up its output as Mica Creek's load was lowered.

== See also ==
- List of active power stations in Queensland
