= Phosphate Hill Power Station =

- Country: Australia
- Location: Queensland
- Coordinates: 21°52′53″S 139°58′32″E
- Status: Operational
- Commission date: 2000

Thermal power station
- Primary fuel: Natural gas

Power generation
- Units operational: 9
- Nameplate capacity: 30 MW

Phosphate Hill Power Station is located 150 km south of Mount Isa, Queensland, Australia. It is natural gas powered with six Solar Taurus 60 gas turbines and one Siemens steam turbine that generate a combined capacity of approx 30 MW of electricity. Emergency black start capacity is provided from 2 Caterpillar 3516 diesel generators.

Phosphate Hill was commissioned in March 2000.

== See also ==
- List of active power stations in Queensland
