= Energy in Queensland =

Energy resources and major export ports in Australia

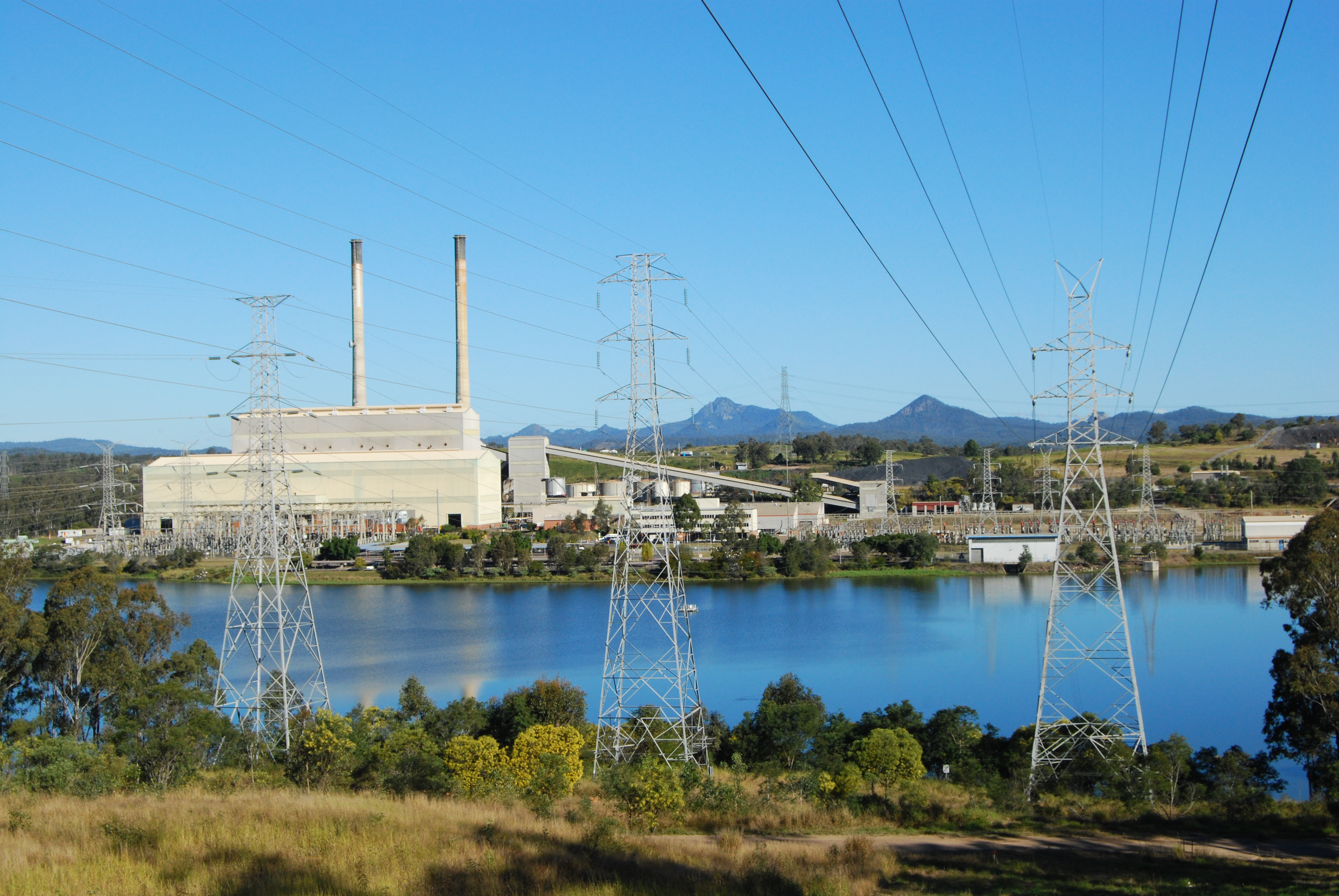
Swanbank Power Station, 2009

Queensland's energy policy is based on the year 2000 document called the Queensland Energy Policy: A Cleaner Energy Strategy. The Queensland Government assists energy development through the Department of Energy and Water Supply. The state is noted for its significant contribution to coal mining in Australia. The primary fuel for electricity generation in the state is coal with coal seam gas becoming a significant fuel source. Queensland has 98% of Australia's reserves of coal seam gas. An expansion of energy-intensive industries such as mining, economic growth and population growth have created increased demand for energy in Queensland.

In 2006, Queensland became the biggest emitter of greenhouse gases in Australia due to its reliance on coal power and road transport. A 2005 government report highlighted the state's vulnerability to rising oil prices.

Queensland was the state to first to produce commercial oil, the first to find natural gas and the first to supply a capital city with natural gas by pipeline. It has Australia's largest onshore oil field, the Jackson oil field. It was also the first state to use a form of hydro-electric power at Thargomindah when water pressure from a well sunk into the Great Artesian Basin was harnessed to generate electric power.

== Electricity market ==
Electricity generation QLD 2015-2021

Year	Maximum capacity (MW)
1972	2,031
1975	2,073
1977	2,345
1979	3,077
1982	3,591
1983	3,614
1987	5,126
1988	4,911
2010	10,000
2014	14,455
2020	15,004
Source: Official Year Book of Australia and Business and industry portal

The state has a current generating capacity of over 15,000 MW. The highest peak demand for electricity in Queensland for which data is currently available was 8,891 MW and occurred on 18 January 2010. Queensland's resources sector creates a strong demand for electricity at mines, smelters and refineries, which are often located in regional Queensland. Two interconnectors between Queensland and New South Wales allow the state to export power south. The first was the Terranora interconnector, commissioned in 2000. The second to be commissioned was the Queensland – New South Wales Interconnector (QNI) in early 2001. The QNI initially had a capacity of 300 MW. With improvements to the electricity systems at either end, the capacity has more than doubled, and currently Queensland can export up to 1380 MW of electricity, or import up to 880 MW. More than 75% of the additional generating capacity built since the creation of the National Electricity Market (NEM) is in Queensland, explaining the relatively large difference between the state's generating capacity and demand.

In April 1985, the SEQEB dispute saw electricity workers walk off the job over stalled wage negotiations. Brisbane and South East Queensland experienced rolling blackouts and 1,000 union members lost their jobs. The electricity generation sector was deregulated in 2007 by former Premier Peter Beattie. In the same year, the Queensland Government banned the development of nuclear power facilities in Queensland.

Because there are fewer people in remote and regional Queensland electricity is subsidised by a Community Service Obligation payment made to distributors such as Energex and Ergon. The Queensland Competition Authority, acting under the Electricity Act 1994, calculates the Benchmark Retail Cost Index which is used to adjust electricity prices on an annual basis.

== Coal ==
In the 2007–08 financial year, 88% of Queensland's electricity generation was fuelled by black coal, 10% from gas and 2% from renewable sources. The energy policy of Queensland stipulates that the government will not issue further generating licences for new coal fired power stations unless world's best practice low emission technology is used and can facilitate carbon capture and storage technology in the future. Access to numerous coal mines, including 10 mines in the major coal-producing region of the Bowen Basin, provided an abundant fuel source which historically was cheaper to produce when compared to renewable sources, as the social, health and climatic costs of burning coal were not accounted for. The IPCC has identified that coal cannot be used for power generation beyond 2050, if warming is to be kept below 1.5C.

== Oil ==
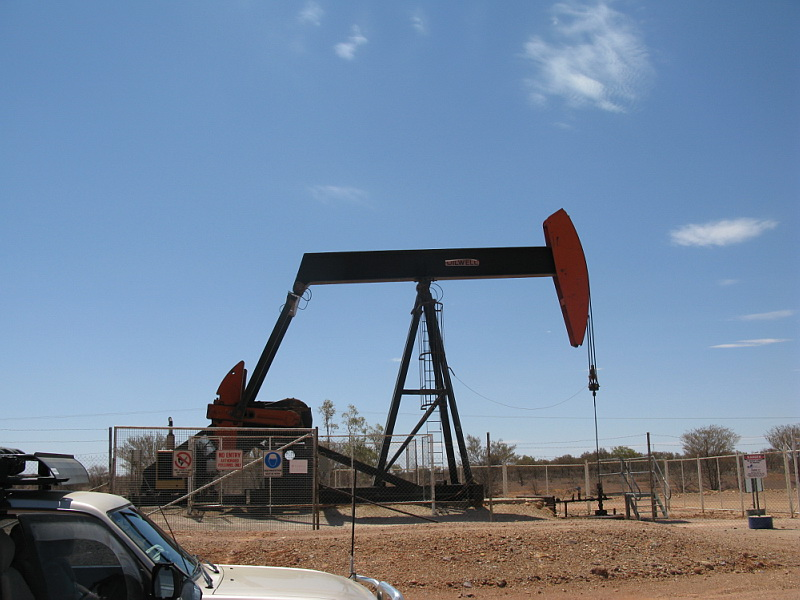
An oil well near Eromanga, 2009

By international standards Queensland has no significant oil reserves. The first commercial production of oil in Australia began at Moonie in 1962. Further oil deposits were discovered in South West Queensland in the 1980s. Australia's largest onshore oil field is the Jackson oil field. An oil pipeline runs from Jackson to Brisbane. In 2003, the pipeline burst open at Lytton causing Queensland's largest-ever oil spill. Queensland has most of Australia's 30 billion barrels of known oil shale resources. In 2008, a 20-year moratorium on oil shale mining was enacted because of environmental concerns. The ban was lifted in early 2013, allowing commercial production to begin at a Queensland Energy Resources plant at Gladstone.

Ampol (previously named Caltex Australia) owns the largest fuels refinery in Queensland, Lytton Oil Refinery, which is located at Lytton. It began operations in 1965 and produces a range of petroleum products which meets more than half of the state's fuel needs. A second fuel refinery, Bulwer Island Refinery, was located nearby at Bulwer Island and is owned by BP. It closed in 2015 and was converted to a fuel import terminal. A much smaller refinery is the Eromanga Refinery near the oil fields of south western Queensland. It produces specialist low-particulate diesel for the underground mining and transport industries.

The Queensland Oil Vulnerability Taskforce was established by Peter Beattie in May 2005. The task force was led by the Member for Hervey Bay, Andrew McNamara, aiming to investigate supply constraints, rising prices and the impact of peak oil on Queenslanders. The taskforce produced the McNamara Report which concluded that the state was highly vulnerable to rising oil prices and that alternative energy sources could not be easily substituted. The key recommendation was for the Queensland Government to develop a mitigation strategy and action plan.

== Gas ==
=== Coal Gas ===
Coal gas (derived from coal) was produced at Petries Bight on the Brisbane River from 1864.

=== Natural Gas ===
The first natural gas find in Australia was at Roma in 1900 as a team was drilling a water well. The first gas pipeline in Australia, the Roma to Brisbane Pipeline, was 435 km in length and was opened on 17 March 1969 by Bjelke-Petersen. It connected the Roma gasfields to Brisbane for commercial and domestic use, a first for a capital city in Australia. The pipeline was extended by 756 km in 1996 to connect with gasfields at Ballera. Another pipeline, which was completed in April 1998, travels north from Ballera to Mount Isa.

Natural gas is extracted from both the Cooper Basin and Eromanga Basins. Natural gas is delivered directly to homes in the cities of Brisbane, the Gold Coast, Ipswich, Toowoomba, Maryborough, Hervey Bay, Bundaberg, Gladstone and Rockhampton.

At some coal mines waste mine gas is collected and used to generate small amounts of power. At Moranbah North coal mine a 45 MW power station generates base load power and reduces greenhouse gas emissions. Oaky Creek coal mines collect enough mine gas to generate 20 MW of power.

=== Coal seam gas ===
Year	Coal seam gas production (PJ)
1994–95	0
1998–99	2
2002–03	27
2005–06	63
2009–10	212
2010–11	234
2011–12	254
Source: Queensland coal seam gas overview

Commercial production of coal seam gas first occurred in Australia in December 1996 at the Dawson Valley project, near the Moura coal mine. Most of the gas produced in Queensland now comes from coal seams. According to 2005 figures, Queensland has 98% of Australia's proven and probable reserves of coal seam gas. In the 2009/10 financial year investment in the coal seam gas industry increased 43% compared to the previous financial year.

In 2010, it was announced that the Curtis LNG Project at Gladstone would process coal-seam gas transported via a 540 km underground pipe from the Surat Basin into liquified natural gas for export. Coal seam gas in the Surat Basin is 98% methane making it relatively pure and requiring little treatment before use. On 21 April 2011, the largest sales and purchase agreement in Australia by annual volume of LNG was signed in Brisbane. The binding agreement between Origin Energy (with joint venture partner ConocoPhillips) and Sinopec will see 4.3 million tonnes of LNG exported to China via Gladstone from 2015 for the next 20 years.

The impact of coal seam gas exploration and production has raised numerous environmental concerns. In a 2011 audit of coal seam gas wells it was found that 34 wells out of 2,719 or 2% had detectable leaks. Five wells had leaks that were at a flammable level.

== Renewables ==
Renewable energy policy is defined under the Queensland Renewable Energy Plan which falls under the auspices of the Office of Clean Energy. Queensland has signed up to the Renewable Energy Target Scheme which aims to produce 20% of Australia's energy from renewables by 2020.

The current energy policy of Queensland will not set targets above the national mandates for renewable energy because of its significant economic impact. Despite having a clear statutory definition of renewable energy and an ample supply of sunlight, renewable energy development in Queensland lags behind other Australian states,

All of Queensland's 21 sugar mills generate seasonal power from the burning of bagasse. Excess power not used by the mill is returned to the grid. The mill at Rocky Point on the Gold Coast substitutes other green waste when sugar cane waste is not available. In Brisbane, there is a waste-to-energy facility at the Rochedale dump and a second is planned for the Willawong landfill.

=== Geothermal ===
In remote South West Queensland, there are large geothermal resources which remain mostly untapped. Near-boiling water is taken from the Great Artesian Basin to power a small geothermal power plant at Birdsville. Here the Cooper Basin and Eromanga Basins contain some of the world's hottest fractured granite which is also close to an adequate water supply for a power station.

In August 2010, the Queensland Parliament passed the Geothermal Energy Act 2010, which supersedes the Geothermal Exploration Act 2004. The new law incorporates production requirements and includes changes to land access policy.

October 2010 saw the announcement of the Coastal Geothermal Energy Initiative by the Queensland Minister for Mines and Energy, Stephen Robertson. The aim of the initiative was to identify geothermal resources which are close to the coast with its existing electricity transmission lines and major population centres. Potential was identified in four geological basins; Tarong Basin, the Maryborough Basin South, the Duaringa Basin North and the Hillsborough Basin.

In 2008, the Queensland Geothermal Energy Centre of Excellence (QGECE) was opened at the University of Queensland, with the goal of research and development into large-scale electricity generation from geothermal energy. This centre was later renamed to Energy Futures, and is now known as the Centre for Multiscale Energy Systems (CMES). The primary research goals of this centre remain within the field of renewable energy, with a current focus on green hydrogen usage.

=== Wind ===
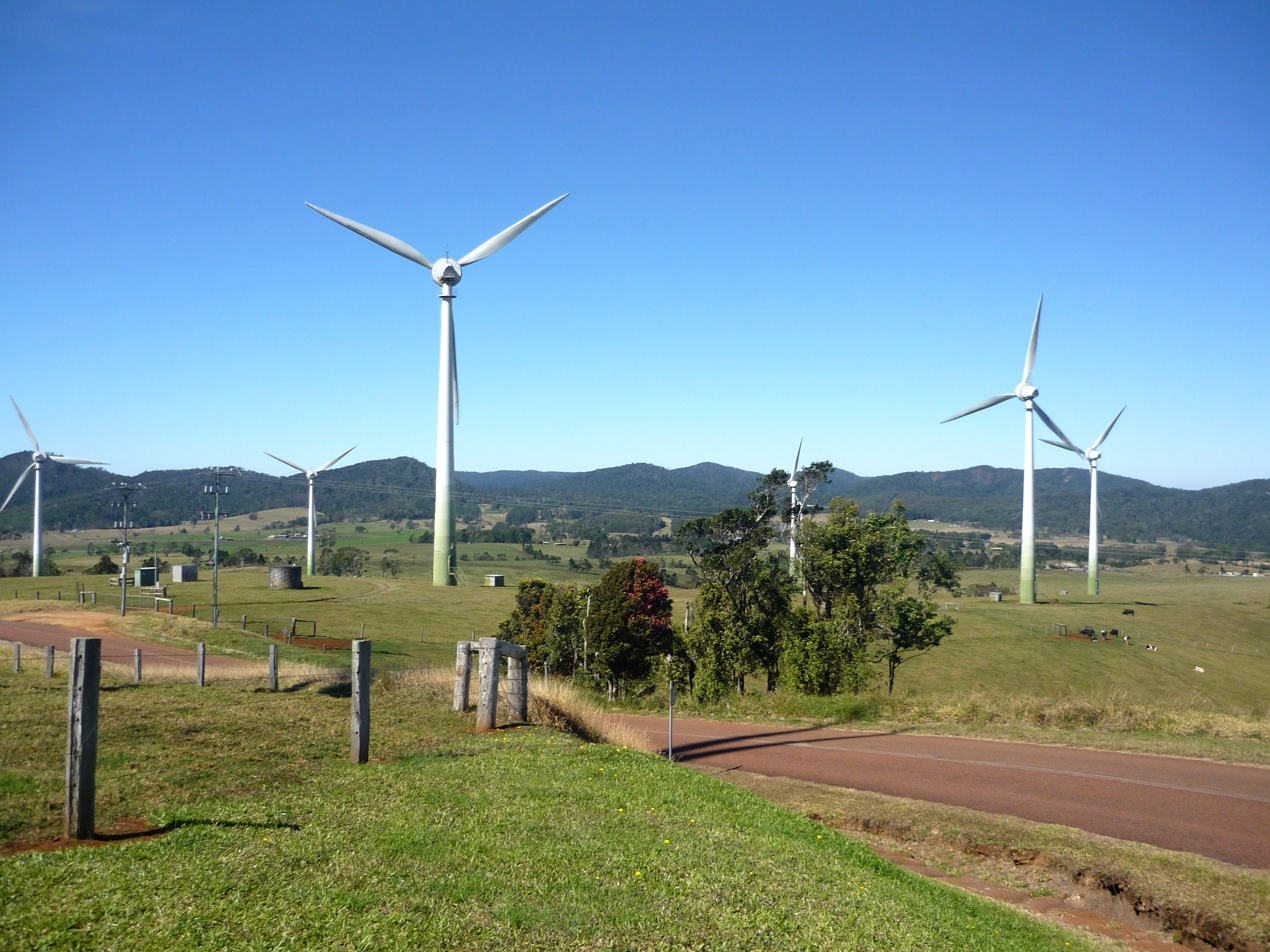
Windy Hill Wind Farm on the Atherton Tableland has 20 wind turbines, 2011

Queensland has been slow to adopt wind power compared to other states and territories in Australia. Windy Hill Wind Farm is the only wind powered power station currently operating in Queensland. There is a small facility with two turbines on Thursday Island and another single turbine on North Keppel Island.

=== Hydro ===
Queensland has some hydro electricity facilities in North Queensland and South East Queensland. The largest is Wivenhoe Hydroelectric Power Station which can produce a maximum of 500 MW when required. The use of bore water at Thargomindah from 1893 has been described as Australia's first hydro-electricity scheme. It was operational until 1951.

=== Solar ===
The Solar Bonus Scheme ran from 2008 to 2013, and rooftop solar is now in 27% of detached homes in south-east Queensland totalling more than 937MW of solar panels. Over 1/3 of owners now receive 6.4 cents per kilowatt hour for surplus power fed back to the grid, and the remaining still receive the scheme's 44c/kWh. The Office of Clean Energy provides a Solar Hot Water Rebate for Queenslanders purchasing and installing a solar hot water system or heat pump.

The installation of rooftop solar systems in Queensland is being hampered by claimed deficiencies in the electricity grid. These claims state that because the grid was designed to deliver power from the station to the home and not vice versa the grid is unable to withstand the power generation from roof top solar. However these claims seem based around excess power more so than actual deficiencies with the loss of income as one of the main concerns listed. For power to 'feed back' as described, you would need to generate enough solar power to meet the requirements of the area serviced by the local substation before it could feed back.

== Initiatives ==
A state government policy of diversification of fuel sources has led to initiatives like the 13% Gas Scheme. The mandatory target for Queensland electricity retailers has subsequently been raised to 15% for 2011 and 18% by 2020. Eligible fuels include natural gas, coal seam gas, liquefied petroleum gas and waste gases. These efforts and the 2006 halt to land clearing in Queensland, form part of the state's strategy to reduce greenhouse gas emissions.

The Office of Clean Energy was established in 2008 to assist companies in developing clean energy projects for the state. It also administers the Solar Bonus Scheme whereby households and other small customers are paid for surplus electricity which is returned to the electricity grid.

The Queensland Government started the Solar Schools program with the aim of reducing schools energy consumption by 30%. The initiative, which began in 2008, involves installing a minimum of two KW solar panels at every Queensland state school. Creche and kindergarten services were also provided funding for the installation of the solar power systems.

The Western Corridor Recycled Water Project in the state's south-east, has been built to ensure water supply to power stations is maintained during drought in Australia. The Queensland Government has made its own energy efficiency improvements under the Government Energy Management Strategy.

In May 2011, the Queensland Government announced the Queensland Energy Management Plan. The aim of the plan is to reduce peak demand and offset the need to commission a new major power station. It includes 28 initiatives ranging from mandatory off-peak tariffs for hot water systems, improved access to off-peak power for pool owners operating pool filters and a trial of managing energy use in vending machines. The plan also includes the establishment of an Energy Management Centre to provide advice on energy efficiency and a special tariff for energy-hungry appliances, such as air conditioners, which can be switched off by electricity distributors at peak times. If the plan were to be fully adopted it could save A$3.5 billion in future infrastructure costs.

== Projects ==
=== Key energy projects in progress ===
- APLNG (Origin and ConocoPhillips)
- GLNG (Santos, Petronas, TotalEnergies and Korea Gas Corporation)
- QCLNG (Shell (QGC subsidiary))

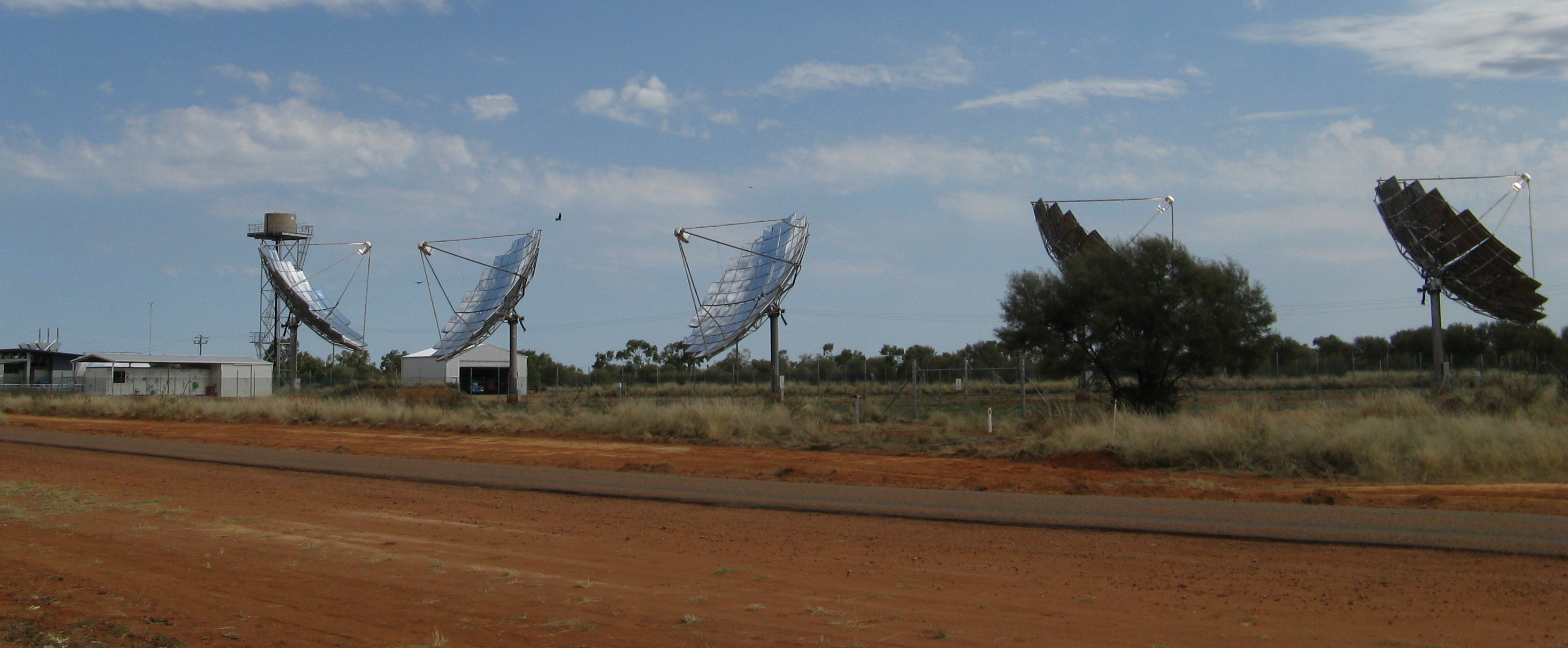
The five reflective dishes of the Windorah Solar Farm, 2011

In 2011, it was announced that the Kogan Creek Solar Boost would go ahead at Brigalow adjacent to Kogan Creek Power Station. The project which uses superheated solar steam technology will be the largest integration of solar technology with a coal-fired power station in the world and the largest solar project in the Southern Hemisphere.

The Windorah Solar Farm is Ergon Energy's first solar farm trial near the town of Windorah. The A$4.5 million project provides a maximum of 180 kW for the town of about 100 people.

The 6 GW CopperString transmission line is a project to link Mount Isa to Townsville and the National Electricity Market, at different voltages. The power lines are expected to cost A$5 billion to develop and have a total length of 1,028 km. The CopperString project was postponed after Xstrata decided to source their electricity from a small gas fired power plant in Mt Isa. Contracts for the project were signed in 2021, and preparations started in July 2024, when construction began for accommodation of 500 people. The line may start construction in 2025.

=== Failed energy projects ===
The Stuart Oil Shale Project near Gladstone was Australia's first major attempt since the 1950s to restart commercial use of oil shale. The project completed a trial phase but was suspended during the environmental impact assessment of the next stage.

The Zerogen power station project located near Stanwell Power Station was planned to be a leading proponent of carbon capture and storage in Australia. Funding for the project was cancelled in 2010 because it was not economically viable. The project included a detailed investigation into the viability of Carbon capture and storage.

A plan to build a 3,200 km long, A$5.5 billion gas pipeline from Papua New Guinea was abandoned by Exxon in early 2007. By then importing gas into Australia had become uneconomic. An underground coal gasification plant owned by Cougar Energy was closed down in July 2011 after the Department of Environment and Resource Management determined it posed a significant risk to underground water in the agricultural region of the South Burnett. The underground plant was one of three trial projects underway in Queensland.

== See also ==
- Contribution to global warming by Australia
- Energy policy of Australia
- List of power stations in Queensland
