= Callide Power Station =

Coal-fired power station in Australia

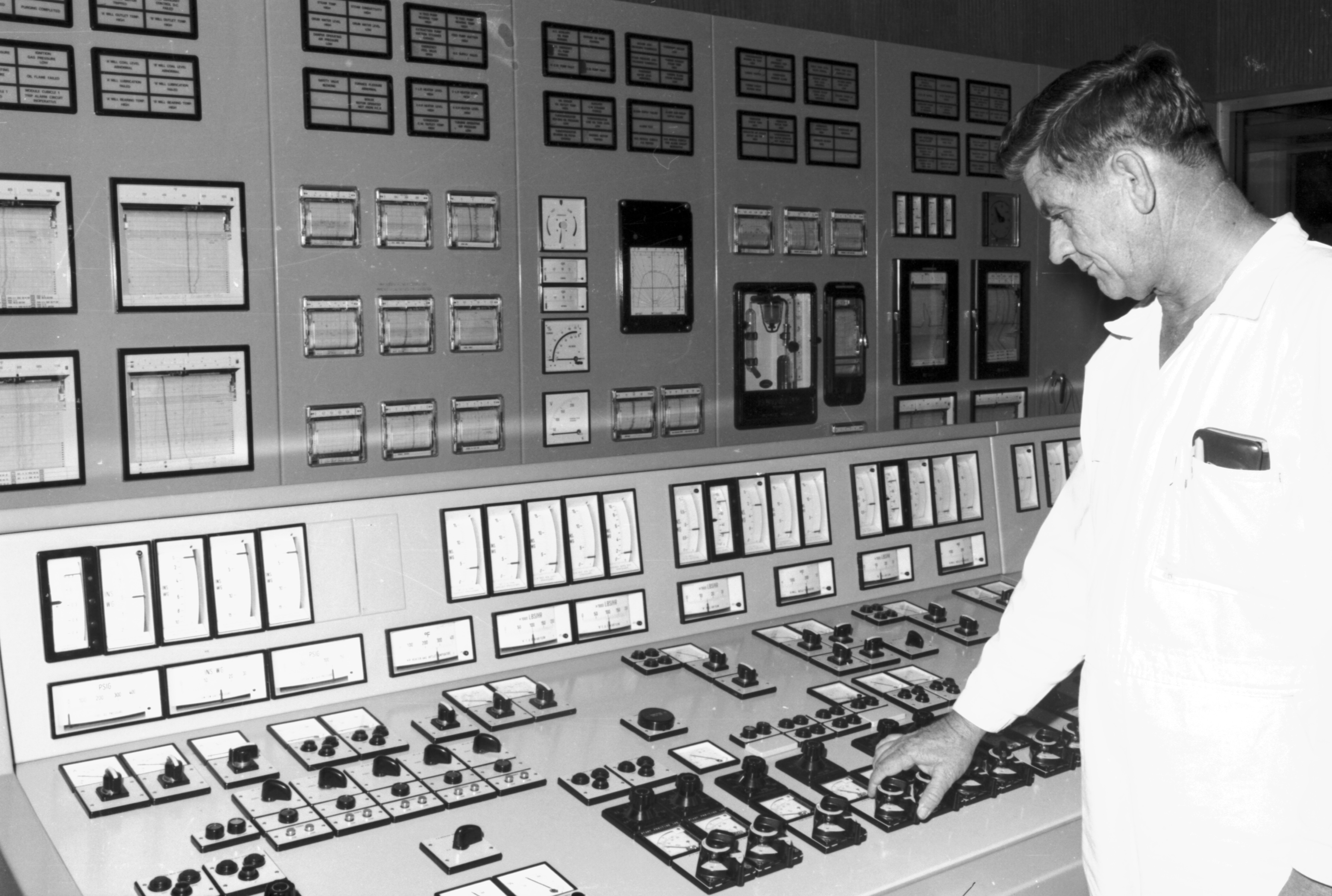
- Control room, Callide Power Station, circa 1967
- Country: Australia
- Location: 1092 Biloela Callide Road, Mount Murchison, Shire of Banana, Queensland
- Coordinates: 24.3450°S 150.6196°E
- Status: Operational
- Commission date: 1965
- Construction cost: $28.7 million
- Owners: CS Energy (50%), Intergen (50%)
- Operator: CS Energy

Thermal power station
- Primary fuel: Coal
- Turbine technology: Steam turbines
- Cooling source: Fresh

Power generation
- Units operational: 4
- Nameplate capacity: 1,544 MW

Callide Power Station is an electricity generator at Mount Murchison, Shire of Banana, Queensland, Australia. It is coal-powered with four steam turbines with a combined generation capacity of 1,544 megawatts (MW) of electricity. Callide A was commissioned in 1965, refurbished in 1998 and decommissioned in 2015/16.

CS Energy owns 100 per cent of Callide A and Callide B, and owns Callide C in a 50/50 joint venture with IG Power. The coal for Callide comes from the nearby Callide Coalfields and water from the Awoonga dam and Stag Creek Pipeline.

== History ==
In November 2022 all four units at the coal-fired Callide Power Station were not operating after a structural failure at the cooling plant brought the C3 unit offline, and later on the B2 unit tripped during scheduled testing, followed by the last unit, B1, also tripping.

=== Callide A ===
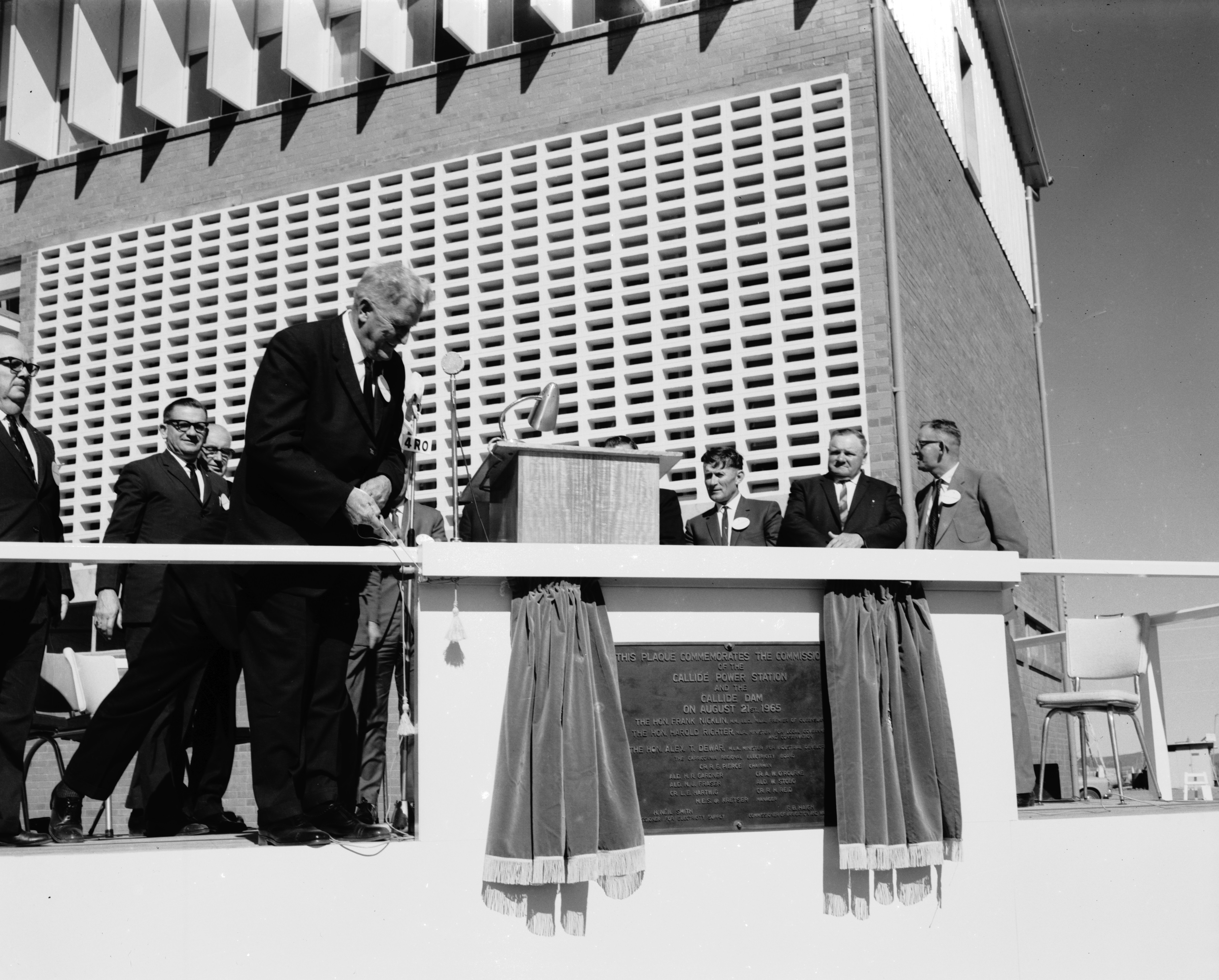
Premier Frank Nicklin opening Callide Power Station, 21 August 1965

At the end of 1962 approval was granted for a new power station near Biloela. Work commenced at the site in February 1963. The design of the plant based around separate generating units and a control room was a first for Queensland. It was also the first power station in Queensland to use dry cooling towers.

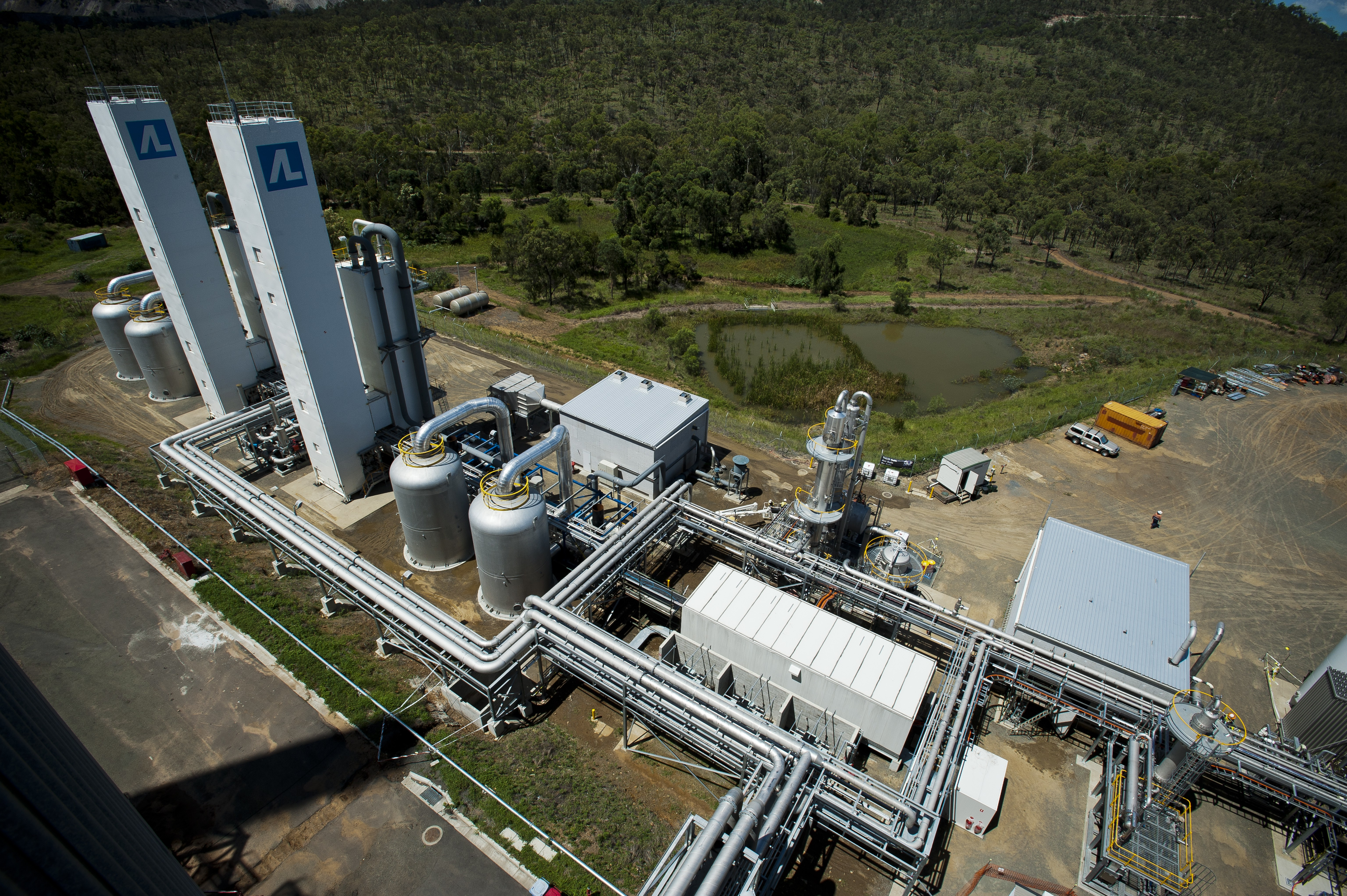
Callide Oxyfuel Project, 2012

It had four 30 MW steam turbines, the first of which was operating by June 1965. From its commissioning a drought meant water restrictions at the station reduced output. The second set was expected to be operating by May 1966, but was lost at sea while being transported from England. A replacement unit arrived in June 1967. The third set was operating in October 1967 and the fourth in May 1969. The total cost of the project was A$28.7 million.

Callide A has been in storage since 2001, except for Unit 4 which was being used for the Callide Oxyfuel project. The Callide Oxyfuel project was decommissioned in 2015/16 after demonstrating carbon capture technology for two years.

=== Callide B ===
Following on from an aggressive construction program at Tarong Power Station, Callide B was commissioned in 1988 with two 350 MW steam turbines. The Hitachi machines are almost identical to those in Tarong and Stanwell.

In October 2019, Federal Energy Minister Angus Taylor announced that Callide B's originally planned 2038–39 closure was being brought forward to 2028.

=== Callide C ===
The Callide Power Plant (a.k.a. Callide C) was commissioned in 2001 with two 405 MW advanced cycle steam turbines. Callide C uses a more efficient "supercritical" boiler technology to burn coal to generate electricity. It was built to operate to 2050.

Carbon Monitoring for Action estimates this power station emits 5.73 million tonnes of greenhouse gases each year as a result of burning coal. The Australian Government introduced a Carbon Pollution Reduction Scheme in 2011 to help combat climate change, intended to reduce emissions from power stations. The scheme was replaced in 2014 by a 'direct action' program. The National Pollutant Inventory provides details of other pollutant emissions, but, as at 23 November 2008, not CO_{2}.

On 25 May 2021, an explosion and subsequent fire at Callide C caused a significant power outage (including Callide B and parts of Stanwell and Gladstone power stations) that affected over 375,000 premises, and caused increased power prices for weeks. A February 2024 technical report found that the explosion was caused by a voltage collapse during installation of a new battery charger. In addition, a June 2024 commissioned report into the explosion by a forensic engineer found that a lack of "effective process safety practices" contributed to the incident. The hydrogen-filled generator had a catastrophic failure, resulting in significant damage. Despite speculation that the plant would close, Callide C3 was repaired at an estimated cost of $200M and reopened in April 2024. A judge ordered Callide Power Trading to pay a penalty of $9 million. The cooling tower at C3 collapsed in 2022, and rebuilt in 2024.

As of 25 June 2024, Callide C4 turbine had not returned to service. It was destroyed in May 2021. As of February 2024, insurance carriers had refused to pay the $300M claimed by CS Energy. Callide Unit C4 was returned to partial service on 30 August 2024.

A 200 MW solar park with 200 MW / 800 MWh battery is planned for the site.

== See also ==
- List of active power stations in Queensland
- List of coal-fired power Stations in Australia
