= Mackay Gas Turbine =

The Mackay Gas Turbine was a remote-controlled power generator that was owned and operated by Stanwell Corporation Ltd. for short periods when customer demand for electricity was high. The gas turbine's ability to start quickly played a role in ensuring a secure, reliable power supply for distribution to consumers.

It was commissioned in 1975, undergoing refurbishment to ensure continued reliable operations in 2014.

The Rolls-Royce Olympus 34 MW gas turbine ran on LFO and had black start capability.

This power station was decommissioned in April 2021, due to it operating so infrequently in its last years of life, and is now off the National Electricity Market (NEM).

== See also ==
- List of power stations in Queensland
