= Condamine Power Station =

Power station in Queensland, Australia

- Country: Australia
- Location: Miles, Queensland
- Coordinates: 26°39′49″S 150°15′53″E
- Status: Operational
- Commission date: June 2010
- Owner: QGC

Thermal power station
- Primary fuel: Coal seam gas
- Turbine technology: Steam turbine and gas turbine

Power generation
- Units operational: 3
- Nameplate capacity: 140 MW

Condamine Power Station is a 140 MW combined cycle power station near Miles on the western Darling Downs in Queensland, Australia. The station is located 8 kilometres (5.0 mi) east of Miles on the south side of the Warrego Highway, while the gas reserves are extracted from the Berwyndale South Gasfield.

The Condamine Power Station is owned by Shell Energy Operations Pty Ltd, a subsidiary of Royal Dutch Shell. Commissioned in June 2009, it has been claimed to be the world's first combined-cycle power station entirely fired by untreated coal seam gas direct from the gasfield and Australia's first steam turbine condenser cooled by coal seam methane wastewater. However, the Townsville Power Statio n at Yabulu was commissioned earlier, in February 200., after being converted from a peak load to a combined cycle configuration, but was designed to consume only treated coal seam gas.

Construction on the Condamine Power Station began on 19 October 2007. It was completed in mid-2010. The EPC contractor was Austrian Energy and Environment, with the gas turbines supplied by Siemens. Parsons Brinckerhoff was the owner's engineer for construction. The gas turbine with dispatchable unit ID (DUID) "CPSA" began bidding into the National Electricity Market on 1 June 2009, with the first generation made available to the market on 10 July 2009. The Columboola Switching Station, which connects Condamine Power Station with the Chinchilla-to-Roma 132-kilovolt transmission line, was completed in October 2008.

AGL Energy had an option to acquire the Condamine Power Station. This option was not exercised and expired on 14 April 2009.

The power station has an installed capacity of 140 MW. Electricity is generated by two gas turbines and one steam turbine from coal seam gas. The two gas turbines are Siemens SGT-800 models and the steam turbine is a Siemens SST-400. According to the NEMMCO Applicants list, the registered capacity of the gas turbine is 87.4 MW (2 x 43.7 MW) and the registered capacity of the steam turbine is 57.1 MW.

== See also ==
- List of active power stations in Queensland
