= Sunshine Coast Solar Farm =

Solar farm in Queensland, Australia

Sunshine Coast
- Country: Australia
- Location: Valdora, Queensland
- Coordinates: 26°33′36″S 153°01′32″E
- Status: Operational
- Construction began: 2016
- Commission date: 2017
- Owner: Sunshine Coast Regional Council

Solar farm
- Type: Flat-panel PV
- Site area: 0.24 square kilometres (0.093 sq mi)

Power generation
- Nameplate capacity: 15 MW

External links
- Website: www.sunshinecoast.qld.gov.au/Council/Planning-and-Projects/Major-Regional-Projects/Sunshine-Coast-Solar-Farm

The Sunshine Coast Solar Farm is a photovoltaic power station operating on a 24 hectares (59 acres) site in Valdora in the Sunshine Coast near Yandina, in Queensland, Australia. The station has a maximum generating capacity of 15 megawatts, generated from 57,850 photovoltaic panels.

The Sunshine Coast Daily newspaper reported in May 2014 that the land Sunshine Coast Regional Council had just purchased for the project for $1.65 million had been sold for $770,000 in September 2012. Real estate agent Nev Kane was quoted as being "astounded by the price".

The Sunshine Coast Solar Farm has been operational since July 24th 2017 and is a significant contributor to Queensland's renewable energy goals.

Sunshine Coast Council acting Mayor Tim Dwyer said in 2018 that the solar farm had saved the council $1.7 million in its first year of operation.

Due to inundation from flooding the installation was disconnected from the grid from February 26 to March 9 2022. A council spokesperson said the solar panels and electrical equipment were installed above the highest known flood level (3.4m recorded in 1992) and the disconnection was precautionary.

Sunshine Coast News reported in February 2025 that property development business VIMG had purchased nearly 100 hectares of land next to the Sunshine Coast Solar Farm and planned to develop an additional solar farm. Sunshine Coast Council stated there had not been any discussions with VIMG in relation to the plans.
