= Collinsville Power Station =

Collinsville Solar Farm
- Country: Australia
- Location: Collinsville, Whitsunday Region, Queensland
- Coordinates: 20°32′36″S 147°48′25″E
- Status: Operational
- Commission date: 2018
- Owner: RATCH-Australia

Solar farm
- Type: Flat-panel PV

Power generation
- Nameplate capacity: 42 MW

External links
- Website: collinsvillesolar.com.au

Collinsville Power Station is located in Collinsville, Whitsunday Region, Queensland, Australia. It had five coal powered steam turbines with a combined generation capacity of 190 MW of electricity. The coal-fired power station closed in 2013. A solar power farm generating 42 MW has been built on adjacent land.

== Solar power ==
RATCH-Australia, the operator of the plant, is in the process of decommissioning and putting under care and maintenance the Collinsville coal-fired power station. It was investigating options to redevelop the site with one or more new forms of electricity generation. As of 20 February 2013, RATCH was partnering with the University of Queensland to investigate replacing all the coal-fired power generators with solar thermal generators.

On 10 July 2014 it was announced that the solar thermal plans for Collinsville would not be proceeding.

On 8 May 2017 it was announced that it will be replaced by a 42 MW solar farm. CIMIC Group's UGL Limited has the contracts for engineering, procurement and construction expected to take 13 months followed by operation and maintenance for five years.

== Coal-fired ==
Collinsville Power Station
- Country: Australia
- Location: Collinsville, Whitsunday Region, Queensland
- Status: Mothballed
- Commission date: 1968
- Decommission date: 2018?

Thermal power station
- Primary fuel: Coal
- Turbine technology: Steam turbine

Power generation
- Units operational: 0
- Nameplate capacity: 190 MW

The coal for Collinsville came from local open-cut mines.

Collinsville was commissioned in 1968 with four 30 MW steam turbines. A 60 MW machine was later commissioned in 1976. These were refurbished in 1999, and upgraded to 66 MW and 31 MW respectively. They were decommissioned by 2018.

Carbon Monitoring for Action estimated this power station emitted 1.34 million tonnes of greenhouse gases each year as a result of burning coal. The Gillard government announced the introduction of a Carbon Pollution Reduction Scheme commencing in 2010 to help combat climate change, which was expected to impact on emissions from power stations. However the Carbon Pollution Reduction Scheme was repealed by the Abbott government in July 2014. The National Pollutant Inventory provided details of other pollutant emissions, but, as at 23 November 2008, not CO_{2}.

== See also ==
- List of active power stations in Queensland
