= Barcaldine Power Station =

- Country: Australia
- Location: Barcaldine, Queensland.
- Coordinates: 23°33′09″S 145°18′51″E
- Status: Operational
- Owner: Ergon Energy Queensland

Thermal power station
- Primary fuel: Gas
- Turbine technology: Steam turbine, gas turbine
- Combined cycle?: Yes

Power generation
- Nameplate capacity: 55 MW

The Barcaldine Power Station is a combined-cycle power station in Barcaldine, Queensland. Its NEMMCO registered capacity as of January 2009 was 55 MW.

According to the Geoscience Australia database, it is also known as the Len Wishaw power station and consists of a 38 MW gas turbine and a 15 MW steam turbine. The steam turbine at the power station is to be taken offline.

The power station was built by Energy Equity Corporation, with the gas turbine being completed in 1995 and the steam turbine added in 1999. The station had originally been planned for Blackall. Enertrade acquired the station and associated gas pipeline in June 2003. With the dissolution of Enertrade in May 2007, the station and pipeline were acquired by Ergon Energy Queensland Pty Ltd.

== See also ==
- List of active power stations in Queensland
