= Barcaldine Solar Farm =

Solar farm in Queensland, Australia

Coordinates: 23°32′52″S 145°19′08″E

The Barcaldine Solar Farm is a solar farm located five kilometres east of the town of Barcaldine in Central Queensland, Australia. The power station is owned by Elecnor and is situated on a 90 hectare site. It will use single-axis tracking technology. The power station can generate 20 megawatts AC. It consists of 78,000 panels.

Power was supplied to the grid in December 2016. It was Queensland's first large scale solar farm.

== See also ==
- List of solar farms in Queensland
