= Mount Stuart Power Station =

Power station in Townsville, Australia

- Country: Australia
- Location: Townsville, Australia
- Coordinates: 19°20′17″S 146°51′04″E
- Status: Operational
- Commission date: December 1998

Thermal power station
- Primary fuel: Fuel oil

Power generation
- Nameplate capacity: 414 MW

The Mount Stuart Power Station is a power station located in Stuart, Townsville, Australia. The station runs on kerosene with three gas turbines that generate a combined capacity of 414 MW of electricity. Mount Stuart was commissioned in December 1998, and operates as a peaking plant. It currently runs on kerosene, but can be converted to natural gas.

Carbon Monitoring for Action estimates this power station emits 0.34 million tonnes of greenhouse gases each year.

== See also ==
- List of power stations in Australia
