= Diamantina Power Station =

Gas-fired power plant in Queensland, Australia

- Country: Australia
- Location: Mount Isa, Queensland
- Coordinates: 20.7847°S 139.4827°E
- Status: Opened
- Construction began: 2012
- Commission date: 2014
- Construction cost: $570 million
- Owner: APA Group

Thermal power station
- Primary fuel: Natural gas
- Combined cycle?: Yes

Power generation
- Units operational: Four 44MW Gas Turbines and two 40MW Steam Turbines
- Nameplate capacity: 242 MW

External links
- Website: Official website

Diamantina Power Station is a combined-cycle gas turbine electricity generation plant in Mount Isa, Queensland. It was developed by APA Group and AGL Energy at a cost of $570 million. Siemens Energy supplied two blocks each with one steam turbine, two gas turbines and two heat-recovery steam generators, with supplementary firing burners.

Construction commenced in 2012. It became operational in mid-2014 with a generating capacity of 328 MW when combined with 60 MW provided by the adjacent Leichhardt Power Station and 26 MW Thompson Power Station.

On 1 October 2014, the Australian Competition & Consumer Commission gave authorisation for the power station owner along with the operator of other generating equipment in the city, Stanwell Corporation, to manage electricity supplied to the North West Power System. However, from 1 January 2020, Diamantina Power Station Pty Ltd became the only major generator on the North West Power System when Stanwell Corporation placed Mica Creek Power Station into cold storage.

== See also ==
- List of power stations in Queensland
