= Gladstone Power Station =

Power station in Queensland, Australia

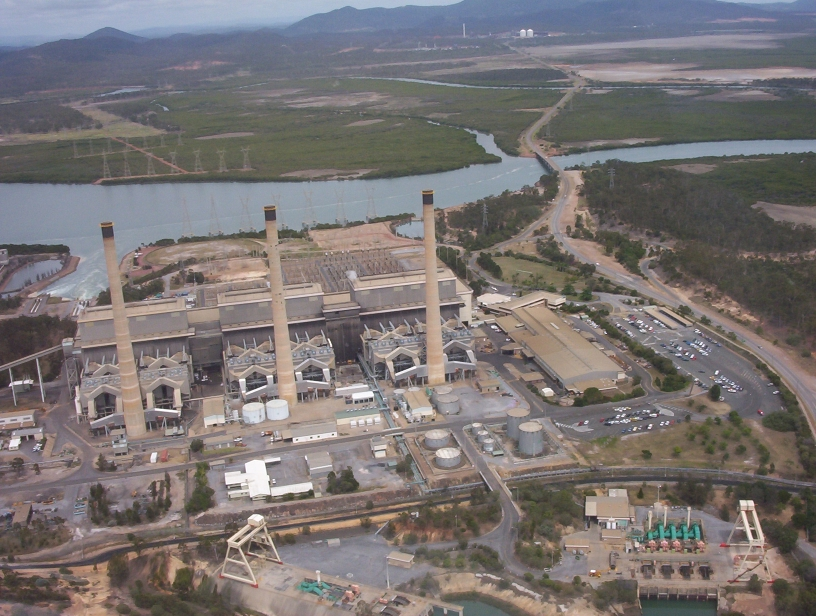
- Power house of the Gladstone Power Station seen from helicopter
- Location of the Gladstone Power Station in Queensland
- Country: Australia
- Location: Gladstone, Queensland
- Coordinates: 23°51′03″S 151°13′10″E
- Status: Operational
- Commission date: 1976
- Construction cost: $508 million
- Owners: Rio Tinto (42.125%); NRG Energy (37.5%); SLMA GPS (8.50%); Ryowa II GPS (7.125%); YKK GPS (4.75%)
- Operators: NRG Gladstone Operating Services; Glenn Schumacher (manager)

Thermal power station
- Primary fuel: Coal

Power generation
- Units operational: 6 x 280 MW
- Make and model: Parsons; Fuji; Siemens
- Nameplate capacity: 1,680 MW

External links
- Commons: Related media on Commons

The NRG Gladstone Power Station is a power station at Callemondah, Gladstone, Queensland, Australia. It is Queensland's largest power station, with six coal powered steam turbines generating a maximum of 1,680 MW of electricity. Power from the station was first generated in 1976.

This fossil fuel power plant draws seawater for cooling. Black coal is brought by rail from the Rolleston coal mine, 200 kilometres (120 mi) west of Rockhampton.

== History ==
Preliminary investigations into a new power station in Central Queensland began in 1968. The demand from expanding industry and the proximity to low cost coal were the major reasons for locating a large power station in the Gladstone area.

The Gladstone Power Station was designed and constructed by the State Electricity Commission of Queensland. A 275 kV transmission line connecting the power station to South East Queensland was to be built as well. It initially consisted of four generating sets generating 275 MW each and was to cost A$198 million. The Federal Government recognised the national importance of the power station, agreeing to contribute up to $80 million.

A September 1975 report recommended the addition of two more generating units at Gladstone. This was approved by the Queensland Government in 1976. Contracts costing $81 million were placed for this expansion.

The plant was privatised in 1994. It is currently owned by a group, including the British-Australian Rio Tinto Aluminium, the US company NRG Energy, which manages the plant, and some Japanese partners.

The station had an unplanned outage rate of 34% in 2022 (18% since 2012), and Rio Tinto plans to move closure from 2035 to 2029, when its supply deal expires.

== Emissions ==
Carbon Monitoring for Action estimates this power station emits 11.80 million tonnes of greenhouse gases each year as a result of burning coal.

== See also ==
- List of active power stations in Queensland
- Stanwell Power Station, Queensland
