= Windy Hill Wind Farm =

Wind farm near Ravenshoe, Queensland

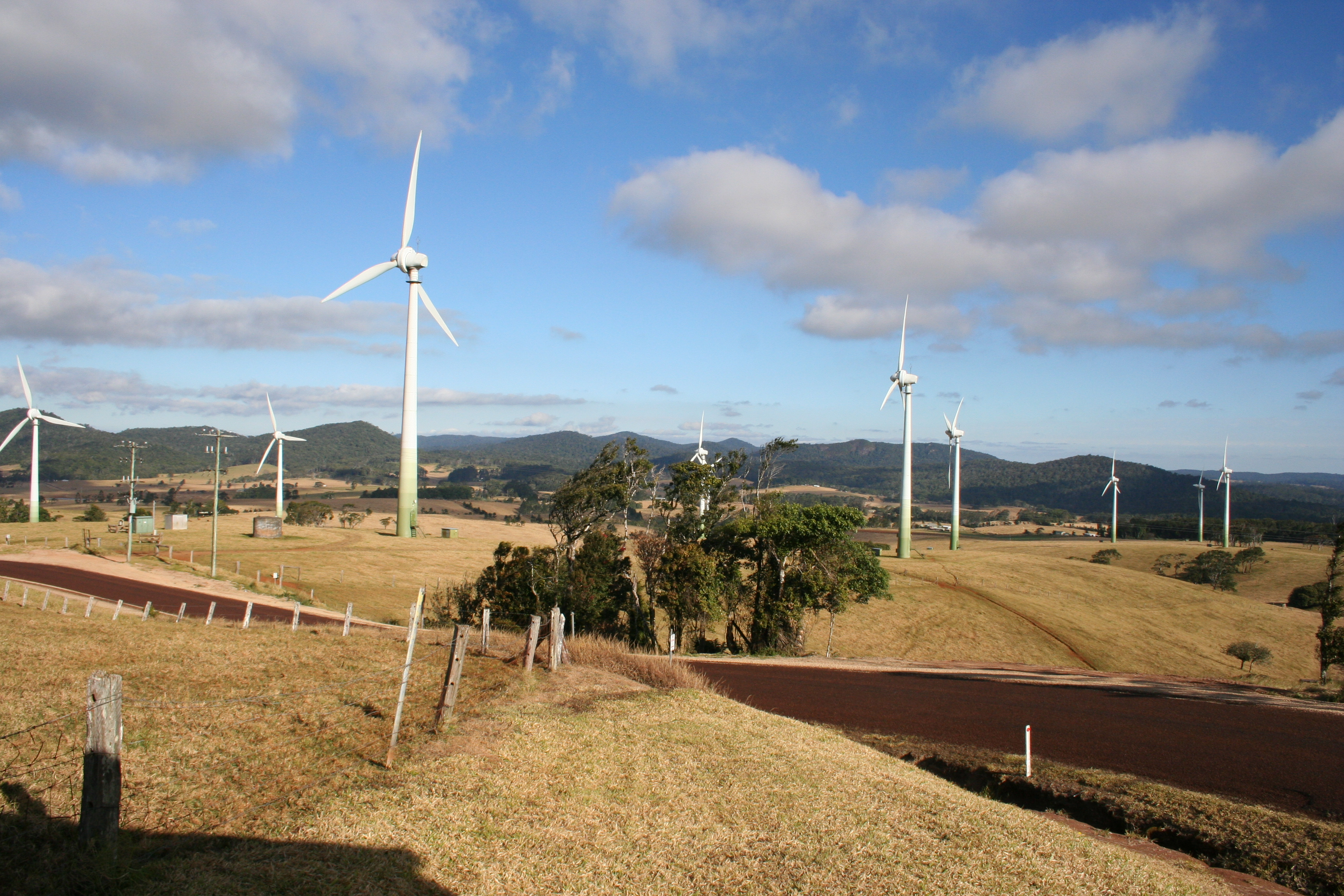
- Windy Hill Wind Farm
- Country: Australia
- Location: Ravenshoe, Queensland
- Coordinates: 17°35′32″S 145°31′50″E
- Status: Operational
- Construction began: 1999; 27 years ago
- Commission date: August 2000; 26 years ago
- Construction cost: $20 million
- Owner: RATCH-Australia

Wind farm
- Type: Onshore
- Site usage: Farm land
- Hub height: 46 m (151 ft)
- Rotor diameter: 44 m (144 ft)
- Rated wind speed: 13-25 m/s
- Site elevation: 1,090 m (3,576 ft)

Power generation
- Units operational: 20
- Make and model: Enercon: E40
- Nameplate capacity: 12MW

External links
- Website: www.tsinfrastructurefund.com/page/Infrastructure_Assets/Windy_Hill_wind_farm

Windy Hill Wind Farm is a wind power station near Ravenshoe on the Atherton Tableland, Queensland, Australia. It has 20 wind turbines with a generating capacity of 12 MW of electricity, providing enough power for about 3,500 homes. The cost of the project was A$20 million. It was the second wind farm to be constructed in Queensland after the 0.45Mw station on Thursday Island (1997).

The power station was commissioned in 2000 and was initially operated by the Stanwell Corporation. In December 2007 Windy Hill was sold to Transfield Services Infrastructure Fund (TSIF) as part of the Queensland Government's ClimateSmart 2050 strategy. A new substation was built to allow the wind farm's power to connect to the existing 66 kV transmission line. RATCH-Australia bought TSIF in 2011.

== Wind turbines ==
The construction contractor for the wind farm was Powercorp. The wind turbines are located on private land that continues to be used as a dairy farm. Each tower is 44 metres (144 ft) high. The turbines used at the facility are Enercon E40. They can rotate at speeds between 14 rpm to 38 rpm. Power from the turbines is carried by underground cable to the electricity grid.

== Issues in 2023 ==
Unused wind turbine blades are stored near the site. The contractor says these blades are being recycled.

There are aboriginal groups both for and against any extension of the current wind farm.

== See also ==
- Wind power in Australia
