= List of power stations in Western Australia =

This is a list of active power stations in Western Australia. Candidates for this list must already be commissioned and capable of generating 1 MW or more of electricity.

There are several independent electricity grids in Western Australia; the "Grid" column in the following tables indicates which grid each power station is connected to.

== Coal fired ==
These fossil fuel power stations burn coal to power steam turbines that generate some or all of the electricity they produce.

Total max. capacity: 1677 MW

| Power station | Max. capacity | Turbines | Coal type | Mine type | Conveyance | Cooling water | Grid |
|---|---|---|---|---|---|---|---|
| Bluewaters | 416 MW | 2 | bituminous | open cut | conveyor | fresh | SWIS |
| Collie | 300 MW | 1 | bituminous | open cut | conveyor | fresh | SWIS |
| Muja | 854 MW | 4 | bituminous | open cut | conveyor | fresh | SWIS |
| Worsley Alumina Power Station | 107 MW | 4 | bituminous | open cut | rail | fresh | SWIS |

== Gas turbine ==
These gas turbine power stations use gas combustion to generate some or all of the electricity they produce.

Total max. capacity: 5288 MW

| Power station | Capacity (MW) | Turbines | Fuel type | Combined cycle | Grid |
|---|---|---|---|---|---|
| Cape Lambert (Pilbara Iron) | 90 | 2 | natural gas/diesel | no | |
| Cape Preston (Sino Iron) | 450 | 7 | natural gas | yes | Private (Cape Preston) |
| Cawse | 21 | 4 | natural gas | no | |
| Cockburn | 240 | 2 | natural gas | yes | SWIS |
| Dampier | 120 | 3 | natural gas | no | NWIS |
| Gorgon Gas Plant | 584 | 5 | natural gas | no | Private (Gorgon Gas Plant) |
| Kambalda | 42 | 1 | natural gas | no | SWIS |
| Kalgoorlie | 64 | 2 | diesel | no | SWIS |
| Kemerton | 300 | 2 | natural gas | no | SWIS |
| Kwinana | 21 | 1 | natural gas | no | SWIS |
| Kwinana Cogeneration Plant - Kwinana Oil Refinery | 120 | 3 | natural gas | yes | SWIS |
| Leinster | 42 | 1 | natural gas | no | |
| Merredin | 82 | 2 | natural gas/diesel | no | |
| Mount Keith | 67 | 2 | natural gas | no | Private (BHP) |
| Mungarra | 112 | 3 | natural gas | no | SWIS |
| Murrin Murrin (Minara Resources) | 76 | 3 | natural gas | yes | |
| Neerabup | 330 | 2 | natural gas | no | SWIS |
| Newman | 170 | 4 | natural gas/diesel | no | NWIS |
| Parkeston | 110 | 3 | natural gas/diesel | no | |
| Pinjar | 576 | 9 | natural gas/diesel | no | SWIS |
| Pinjarra Alumina Refinery, Alcoa Australia / AGL | 280 | 2 | natural gas | No | SWIS |
| Port Hedland (Alinta) | 175 | 5 | natural gas/diesel | no | NWIS |
| Paraburdoo (Pilbara Iron) | 135 | 3 | natural gas | no | NWIS |
| South Hedland (Transalta) | 155 | 3 | natural gas/diesel | yes | NWIS |
| Telfer Gold Mine, Newmont Mining | 135 | 3 | natural gas | no | Private (Newmont Mining) |
| West Angelas Power Station (Pilbara Iron) | 90 | 2 | natural gas/diesel | no | |
| Worsley Alumina Power Station | 120 | 1 | natural gas | yes | SWIS |
| Yurralyi Maya Power Station (Pilbara Iron) | 225 | 5 | natural gas | no | NWIS |

== Gas (thermal) ==
These power stations use gas combustion to power steam turbines that generate some or all of the electricity they produce.

Total max. capacity: 274 MW

| Power station | Max. capacity (MW) | Turbines | Fuel type | Grid |
|---|---|---|---|---|
| Capel (Iluka Resources) | 6.5 | 1 | waste heat | |
| Kwinana Alumina Refinery, Alcoa Australia | 74.5 | 7 | natural gas | |
| Pinjarra Alumina Refinery, Alcoa Australia | 95 | 4 | natural gas | SWIS |
| Wagerup Alumina Refinery, Alcoa Australia | 98 | 4 | natural gas | SWIS |

== Gas (reciprocating) ==
These power stations use gas combustion in reciprocating engines to generate some or all of the electricity they produce.

Total max. capacity: 108 MW

| Power station | Max. capacity (MW) | Engines | Fuel type |
|---|---|---|---|
| Atlas (Mirrabooka) | 1.1 | 1 | landfill gas |
| Canning Vale | 4 | 1 | landfill gas |
| Carnarvon | 15.27 | 3 | natural gas |
| Dongara | 1.6 | 3 | natural gas |
| Esperance | 22 | 11 | natural gas |
| Henderson (Wattleup) | 2.13 | 1 | landfill gas |
| Jundee (Northern Star Ltd) | 13.2 | 6 | natural gas |
| Kalamunda | 1.9 | 1 | landfill gas |
| Kelvin Road, Gosnells | 2 | 2 | landfill gas |
| Leonora | 3.2 | 5 | natural gas |
| Millar Road, Rockingham | 1.6 | 2 | landfill gas |
| Mount Magnet | 1.9 | 1 | natural gas |
| Plutonic (Billabong Gold) | 20 | 7 | natural gas |
| Red Hill | 3.65 | 1 | landfill gas |
| South Cardup | 3.3 | 3 | landfill gas |
| Tamala Park | 4.65 | 1 | landfill gas |
| Wiluna (Blackham Resources) | 9 (mothballed) 4 sets operational | 3 | natural gas |
| Windimurra | 13 | 4 | natural gas |
| Wodgina Tantalum Mine | 56 | 28 | natural gas |
| Woodman Point | 1.8 | 3 | sewage gas |

== Hydroelectric ==
These hydroelectric power stations use the flow of water to generate some or all of the electricity they produce.

Total max. capacity: 32 MW

| Power station | Max. capacity | Turbines | Pumped storage | Grid |
|---|---|---|---|---|
| Ord River Hydro | 30 MW | 4 | no | Kununurra-Wyndham-Lake Argyle |

== Wind farms ==
These wind farm power stations use the power of the wind to generate some or all of the electricity they produce.

Total max. capacity: 1012 MW

| Power station | Max. capacity (MW) | Turbines | Grid |
|---|---|---|---|
| Albany | 35.4 | 18 | SWIS |
| Badgingarra Wind Farm | 130 | 37 | SWIS |
| Blairfox Beros Road Wind Farm | 9.5 | 19 | SWIS |
| Blairfox Karakin Wind Farm | 5 | 10 | SWIS |
| Blairfox West Hills Wind Farm | 5 | 10 | SWIS |
| Collgar Wind Farm | 206 | 111 | SWIS |
| Denmark Community Wind Farm | 1.4 | 2 | SWIS |
| Emu Downs | 79.2 | 48 | SWIS |
| Esperance (Nine Mile Beach Wind Farm) | 3.6 | 6 | Microgrid Horizon Power |
| Esperance (Shark Lake Road) | 9 | 2 | Microgrid Horizon Power |
| Esperance (Ten Mile Lagoon Wind Farm) | 2.03 | 9 | Microgrid Horizon Power |
| Grasmere Wind Farm | 13.8 | 6 | SWIS |
| Kalbarri Wind Farm | 1.6 | 2 | SWIS |
| Mt Barker Wind Farm | 2.4 | 3 | SWIS |
| Mumbida Wind Farm | 55 | 22 | SWIS |
| Walkaway Wind Farm | 90 | 54 | SWIS |
| Warradarge Wind Farm | 180 | 51 | SWIS |
| Yandin Wind Farm | 212 | 51 | SWIS |

== Biomass combustion ==
These power stations burn biomass (biofuel) to generate some or all of the electricity they produce.

Total max. capacity: 6 MW

| Power station | Max. capacity | Turbines | Fuel type | Conveyance | Grid |
|---|---|---|---|---|---|
| Ord Sugar Mill, Kununurra | 6 MW | 1 | bagasse | on-site | Kununurra-Wyndham-Lake Argyle |

== Solar photovoltaic ==
These power stations use a semiconductor device that converts sunlight into electricity.

Total max. capacity: 191 MW

| Power station | Max. capacity MW | Solar panels | Grid |
|---|---|---|---|
| Cunderdin | 128 | | SWIS, 55 MW/220 MWh battery |
| Ambri Solar Farm | 1 | | SWIS |
| Badgingarra Solar Farm | 19.25 | 62,000 | SWIS |
| Emu Downs Solar Farm | 20 | 75,000 | SWIS |
| Esperance Solar Farm | 4 | 8,900 | Microgrid Horizon Power |
| Garden Island | 2 | 6,400 | Microgrid |
| Greenough River Solar Farm | 40 | | SWIS |
| Merredin Solar Farm | 100 | 360,000 | SWIS |
| Northam Solar Farm | 10 | 33,600 | SWIS |

== See also ==
- List of power stations in Australia
- Synergy (electricity corporation)
- Horizon Power
- South West Interconnected System
