= List of natural gas-fired power stations in Australia =

Gas turbine power stations use gas combustion to generate some or all of the electricity they produce. Thermal gas power stations use gas combustion to power steam turbines that generate some or all of the electricity they produce. Reciprocating gas power stations use gas combustion in reciprocating engines to generate some or all of the electricity they produce.

== New South Wales ==
=== Gas (turbine) ===
Power station	Operator	Max. capacity	Turbines	Fuel type	Combined cycle
Colongra	Snowy Hydro	667 MW	4	natural gas	no
Liddell	AGL Energy	50 MW	2	fuel oil	no
Smithfield	Visy	171 MW	4	natural gas	yes
Tallawarra	EnergyAustralia	435 MW	2	natural gas	yes
Uranquinty	Origin Energy	641 MW	4	natural gas	no

=== Gas (reciprocating) ===
Power station	Max. capacity	Engines	Fuel type
Appin Mine	55.6 MW	54	coalbed methane+natural gas
Belrose	4 MW	1	landfill gas
Earthpower Camellia	3.9 MW	3	biogas
Jacks Gully	2.3 MW	1	landfill gas
Kincumber Landfill Gas Abatement	1 MW	1	landfill gas
Lucas Heights I	5.4 MW	5	landfill gas
Lucas Heights II	17.3 MW	15	landfill gas
Shoalhaven Landfill Gas Project	1 MW	1	landfill gas
Sydney Water, Malabar	3 MW	3	sewage gas
Tahmoor	7 MW	7	coalbed methane
Teralba	8 MW	8	coalbed methane
Tower Mine	41.2 MW	40	coalbed methane+natural gas
Wilga	11 MW	11	natural gas
Woodlawn	4 MW	4	landfill gas
Woy Woy Landfill Gas Abatement	1 MW	1	landfill gas

State total (MW): 2129.7

== Queensland ==
=== Gas (turbine) ===
Power station	Max. capacity	Turbines	Fuel type	Cycle	Refs
Barcaldine	55 MW	2	natural gas	Combined	
Braemar	952 MW	6	coal seam gas	Open	
Bulwer Island, BP	32 MW	3	coal seam gas	Combined	
Condamine	144 MW	3	coal seam gas	Combined	
Darling Downs	630 MW	4	coal seam gas	Combined	
Diamantina	242 MW	2	coal seam gas	Combined	
Leichhardt	60 MW	1	coal seam gas	Open	
Mackay Gas Turbine	34 MW	1	oil	Open	
Mica Creek	318 MW	12	natural gas	Combined	
Mount Stuart	414 MW	3	kerosene	Open	
Oakey	282 MW	2	natural gas	Open	
Phosphate Hill	42 MW	9	natural gas	Combined	
Roma	80 MW	2	natural gas	Open	
Swanbank E	385 MW	1	natural gas/coal seam gas	Combined	
Tarong Gas Turbine	15 MW	1	diesel	Open	
Townsville	242 MW	2	coal seam gas	Combined	

=== Gas (reciprocating) ===
Power station	Max. capacity	Engines	Fuel type
Browns Plains	2.18 MW	2	landfill gas
Cannington, BHP	40.06 MW	22	natural gas / diesel
Condamine	3 MW	1	coal seam gas
Coominya, AFC Abattoirs	1.73 MW	3	natural gas
Daandine	33 MW	11	coal seam gas
Luggage Point, Myrtletown	3 MW	2	sewage gas
Middlemount	45 MW	20	coal seam gas
Molendinar	0.7 MW	1	landfill gas
Moranbah	45 MW	15	coal seam gas
Mount Isa XPS41	47.5 MW	19	natural gas
Rochedale	3.3 MW	3	landfill gas
Roghan Road	1.95 MW	1	landfill gas
Stapylton	1 MW	1	landfill gas
Suntown, Arundel	1 MW	1	landfill gas
Swanbank B	7 MW	1	landfill gas
Whitwood Road	1.1 MW	1	landfill gas

State total (MW): 3713.52

== South Australia ==
=== Gas (turbine) ===
Power station	Owner/operator	Max. capacity	Turbines	Fuel type	Combined cycle
Coopers Brewer (Regency Park)	AGL Energy	4.4 MW	1	natural gas	yes
Dry Creek	Synergen Power	156 MW	3	natural gas	no
Hallett	Energy Australia	180 MW	12	natural gas/diesel	yes
Ladbroke Grove	Origin Energy	80 MW	2	natural gas	no
Mintaro	Synergen Power	90 MW	1	natural gas	no
Osborne	Osborne Cogeneration	180 MW	2	natural gas	yes
Pelican Point	Engie	478 MW	3	natural gas	yes
Port Lincoln	Synergen Power	73.5 MW	3	diesel	no
Quarantine	Origin Energy	224 MW	5	natural gas	no
Snuggery	Synergen Power	63 MW	3	diesel	no
Temporary Generation North (former Holden site)	SA Government	154 MW	5	diesel	no
Temporary Generation South (Adelaide Desalination Plant)	SA Government	123 MW	4	diesel	no
Whyalla Steelworks	Arrium	8.4 MW	2	natural gas	no

The two "temporary generation" facilities were introduced by the South Australian government before the 2017-18 summer season using General Electric gas turbine generators. They are intended to be used only in extreme circumstances to support the grid following two widespread blackouts in 2016. They are installed at the sites of the former Holden factory in Elizabeth South and the Adelaide Desalination Plant at Lonsdale.

=== Gas (thermal) ===
Power station	Owner/operator	Max. capacity	Turbines	Fuel type
Torrens Island	AGL Energy	1,280 MW	8	natural gas
Whyalla Steelworks	Arrium	57.5 MW	3	coke ovens and blast furnace gas/oil

=== Gas (reciprocating) ===
Power station	Owner/operator	Max. capacity	Engines	Fuel type
Angaston	Snowy Hydro	50 MW	30	diesel
Barker Inlet Power Station	AGL Energy	210 MW	12	natural gas
Blue Lake Milling Power Plant	Vibe Energy	1 MW	1	diesel
Bolivar Waste Water Treatment Plant	SA Water	9.9 MW	4	sewerage gas
Kangaroo Island power station	SA Power Networks	6 MW	3	diesel
Lonsdale	Snowy Hydro	21 MW	18	diesel
Pedler Creek Landfill		3 MW	3	landfill gas
Port Stanvac	Snowy Hydro	58 MW	36	diesel
Tatiara Meats Bordertown	Vibe Energy	1 MW	1	diesel
Wingfield Landfill	Energy Developments	8 MW	8	landfill gas

State total (MW): 3519.7

== Tasmania ==
=== Gas (thermal) ===
Power station	Coordinates	Max. capacity		Turbines	Fuel type	Ref.
Power station	Coordinates	MW	hp	Turbines	Fuel type	Ref.
Bell Bay	41°8′31″S 146°54′9″E	240	321,845	2	Natural gas	

=== Gas (turbine) ===
Power station	Coordinates	Max. capacity		Turbines	Fuel type	Combined cycle	Ref.
Power station	Coordinates	MW	hp	Turbines	Fuel type	Combined cycle	Ref.
Bell Bay	41°8′31″S 146°54′9″E	135	181,038	3	Natural gas	No	
Tamar Valley		210	281,615	5	Natural gas	Yes	

Note that the above three power stations are in fact the same power station listed upon commissioning after conversion to gas and recommissioning after a turbine upgrade. It has been decommissioned since 2009.

=== Gas (reciprocating) ===
Power station	Coordinates	Max. capacity		Engines	Fuel type	Ref.
Power station	Coordinates	MW	hp	Engines	Fuel type	Ref.
Jackson Street, Glenorchy		1.6	2,146	1	landfill gas	
Launceston General Hospital, Launceston		2	2,682	1	natural gas	
McRobies Gully, South Hobart		1	1,341	1	landfill gas	

State total (MW): 589.6

== Victoria ==
=== Gas (turbine) ===
Power station	Max. capacity	Turbines	Fuel type	Combined cycle	Ref
Bairnsdale	92 MW	2	natural gas	no	
Jeeralang	432 MW	7	natural gas	no	
Laverton North	320 MW	2	natural gas	no	
Longford	31.8 MW	6	natural gas	no	
Mortlake	550 MW	2	natural gas	no	
Somerton	160 MW	4	natural gas	no	
Valley Power	300 MW	12	natural gas	no	

=== Gas (thermal) ===
Power station	Max. capacity	Turbines	Fuel type
Newport	500 MW	1	natural gas

=== Gas (reciprocating) ===
Power station	Max. capacity	Engines	Fuel type	Ref
Boral Western Landfill, Ravenhall	4.6 MW	4	landfill gas	
Broadmeadows	6.2 MW	6	landfill gas	
Brooklyn Landfill and Waste Recycling Facility	2.83 MW	3	landfill gas	
Clayton	11 MW	11	landfill gas	
Corio (EDL)	1 MW	1	landfill gas	
Mornington Waste Disposal Facility	1 MW	1	landfill gas	
Morwell (Tramway Road) (HRL)	5 MW	1	diesel	
Narre Warren	7.2 MW	5	landfill gas	
Springvale	4.2 MW	4	landfill gas	
Sunshine Energy Park	8.7 MW	1	landfill gas	
Werribee (AGL Energy)	7.8 MW	7	sewage gas	
Wyndham Waste Disposal Facility	1 MW	1	landfill gas	

State total (MW): 6946.33

== Western Australia ==
=== Gas (turbine) ===
Power station	Max. capacity	Turbines	Fuel type	Combined cycle
Cape Lambert (Pilbara Iron)	105 MW	3	natural gas	no
Cape Preston	450 MW	7	natural gas	yes
Cawse	21 MW	4	natural gas	no
Cockburn	240 MW	2	natural gas	yes
Dampier	120 MW	3	natural gas	no
Esperance (Burns and Roe Worley)	33 MW	4	natural gas	no
Kalgoorlie	42 MW	1	natural gas	no
Kambalda	42 MW	1	natural gas	no
Kemerton (Transfield)	260.9 MW	2	natural gas	no
Kwinana	21 MW	1	natural gas	no
Kwinana - BP Refining	120 MW	3	natural gas	yes
Kwinana - NewGen	320 MW	1	natural gas	yes
Kwinana - Tiwest	36 MW	1	natural gas	no
Leinster	42 MW	1	natural gas	
Mount Keith	67 MW	2	natural gas	no
Mungarra	112 MW	3	natural gas	no
Murrin Murrin (Minara Resources)	76 MW	3	natural gas	yes
Neerabup	330 MW	2	natural gas	no
Newman	170 MW	4	natural gas/diesel	no
Paraburdoo (Pilbara Iron)	155 MW	4	natural gas	no
Parkeston	110 MW	3	natural gas/diesel	no
Pinjar	576 MW	9	natural gas/diesel	no
Pinjarra Alumina Refinery, Alcoa / AGL	280 MW	2	natural gas	No
Port Hedland	175 MW	5	natural gas/diesel	no
Worsley Alumina Power Station	120 MW	1	natural gas	yes

=== Gas (thermal) ===
Power station	Max. capacity	Turbines	Fuel type
Capel (Iluka Resources)	6.5 MW	1	waste gas
Kwinana Alumina Refinery, Alcoa	74.5 MW	7	natural gas
Pinjarra Alumina Refinery, Alcoa	95 MW	4	natural gas
Telfer Gold Mine, Newcrest	135 MW	3	natural gas
Wagerup Alumina Refinery, Alcoa	98 MW	4	natural gas

=== Gas (reciprocating) ===
Power station	Max. capacity	Engines	Fuel type
Atlas (Mirrabooka)	1.1 MW	1	landfill gas
Canning Vale	4 MW	1	landfill gas
Carnarvon	15.27 MW	3	natural gas
Dongara	1.6 MW	3	natural gas
Henderson (Wattleup)	2.13 MW	1	landfill gas
Jundee (Northern Star Ltd)	13.2 MW	6	natural gas
Kalamunda	1.9 MW	1	landfill gas
Kelvin Road, Gosnells	2 MW	2	landfill gas
Leonora	3.2 MW	5	natural gas
Millar Road, Rockingham	1.6 MW	2	landfill gas
Mount Magnet	1.9 MW	1	natural gas
Plutonic (Billabong Gold)	16 MW	4	natural gas
Red Hill	3.65 MW	1	landfill gas
South Cardup	3.3 MW	3	landfill gas
Tamala Park	4.65 MW	1	landfill gas
Wiluna (Blackham Resources)	9 MW (mothballed, 4 sets operational)	3	natural gas
Windimurra	13 MW	4	natural gas
Wodgina Tantalum Mine	8.82 MW	10	natural gas
Woodman Point	1.8 MW	3	sewage gas

State total (MW): 4541.02

== See also ==
- List of power stations in Australia
- List of coal power stations
- List of coal fired power stations in Australia
- List of largest power stations in the world
