= List of proposed power stations in Australia =

This is a list of proposed power stations in the Commonwealth of Australia. Australia currently has 11 proposed fossil power plants, 42 proposed renewable plants, and eight others.

== Fossil fuelled ==
State	Project name	Sponsoring company	Coordinates	Capacity in MW	Status	Notes
SA	Kingston	Hybrid Energy	36.8°S 139.8°E (Check)	300	Cancelled	Brown coal
SA	Arckaringa	Altona Resources	27.5°S 135.5°E (estimate)	560	Cancelled	Coal to liquid, proposed to have CCS
SA	Tailem Power Precinct	LD Energy	-35.28418784232653, 139.48659603028355	300	Planning	Fast start with COD by December 2028
NSW	Redbank 2	Altona Resources	27.60°S 152.86°E (estimate)	151	Cancelled	Coal tailings-fired power station
SA	Reeves Plains	Alinta Energy	34.504°S 138.611°E	300	Approved	To be supplied from Moomba-Adelaide gas pipeline
QLD	ZeroGen	Government of Queensland	23.37°S 150.51°E (estimate)	300	Cancelled	Integrated gasification combined cycle (IGCC) with carbon capture and storage (CCS)
QLD	Spring Gully	Origin Energy	25.446°S 150.007°E (estimate)	1000	Possibly abandoned	Combined-cycle gas-fired power station. First 500 MW stage was planned to be operational in 2008, but as of 2019 has not been built and is no longer on the Origin Energy website.
WA	Bluewaters 3 & 4	Griffin Energy		416	On hold	Fuel is thermal coal. Project delayed due to decreasing demand.
WA	Coolimba	Aviva Corporation Ltd and AES, sold to Westgen	29.949°S 115.213°E (estimate)	450	Rejected	Fuel is sub-bituminous coal.
VIC	Shaw River	Santos	38.184°S 142.111°E (estimate)	1500	Abandoned	Gas
VIC	Tarrone	AGL	38.181°S 142.180°E	920	On hold	Gas peaking
SA	Quarantine Power Station Expansion	Origin Energy		160/180	Proposed	Includes an LPG import/storage terminal

== Nuclear ==
State	Project name	Sponsoring company	Coordinates	Capacity in MW	Commissioning date	Status	Notes
JBT	Jervis Bay Nuclear Power Plant	EnergyAustralia	35.133841°S 150.757424°E	500	1969-71	Cancelled	

== Hydro ==
State	Project name	Sponsoring company	Coordinates	Capacity in MW	Commissioning date	Status	Notes
QLD	Burdekin Hydro	Stanwell Corporation	20.6435°S 147.138°E	37		Proposed	
QLD	Kidston Pumped Hydro (using former Kidston Gold Mine)	Genex Power	19.0833°S 144.124°E	250	Expected 2024	Pre-construction	
SA	Goat Hill Pumped Hydro	Altura Group/Delta Electricity		230	Expected late 2022	Proposed	At Lincoln Gap, 12 km west of Port Augusta using fresh water
SA	Cultana Pumped Hydro Project	EnergyAustralia and Arup Group	32.59°S 137.73°E	225	Proposed for 2023	Proposed, pending investment decision	Using seawater
SA	Highbury Pumped Hydro	Tilt Renewables	34.85°S 138.74°E	300		Cancelled	Using a former quarry
SA	Baroota pumped hydro	Rise Renewables	32.92°S 138.06°E	200–270		Proposed	Baroota Reservoir 40 km northeast of Port Pirie
SA	Middleback Pumped Hydro	GFG Alliance	33.25°S 137.11°E	1000		Proposed	Iron Duchess mine
SA	Kanmantoo mine	AGL Energy	35.09°S 139.01°E	250	Plans dropped in February 2020	Cancelled	

== Biomass ==
State	Project name	Sponsoring company	Coordinates	Capacity in MW	Commissioning date	Status	Notes
TAS	Bell Bay Pulp Mill	Gunns	41.155°S 146.92°E	180	2013	Cancelled	Pulp mill biomass
SA	Yorke Biomass Energy Project	Yorke Biomass Energy Pty Ltd		15		Proposed	Will use straw as fuel
SA	Edinburgh Parks Bioreactor Plant Stage 1	DeLorean Energy		8	2020	Proposed	Converts food waste into methane gas
SA	Edinburgh Parks Bioreactor Plant Stage 2	DeLorean Energy		7	2021	Proposed	Converts food waste into Methane gas
QLD	Ingham Integrated Energy Facility	North Queensland Bio-Energy Corporation Limited		115	June 2021	Proposed	

== Landfill gas ==
State	Project name	Sponsoring company	Coordinates	Capacity in MW	Commissioning date	Status	Notes
NSW	Woodlawn Bioreactor (units 7 to 12)	EnergyAustralia		6	Q3, 2015 to Q4, 2021	Proposed	Landfill gas
NSW	Woodlawn Bioreactor (units 4 to 6)	EnergyAustralia		3	Q4 2011 to Q2 2014	Proposed	Landfill gas
NSW	Club Merrylands	Energy Response		0.8	Q4 2011 to Q2 2014	Proposed	Liquid fuel

== Wind ==
State	Project name	Sponsoring company	Coordinates	Capacity in MW	Commissioning date	Status	Notes
QLD	Kennedy Wind Farm	Windlab	21°S 145°E	750		Proposed	
QLD	Crows Nest	AGL Energy	27°13′S 151°57′E	200		Proposed	
QLD	Archer Point		15°34′S 145°18′E	120		Proposed	
QLD	Clarke Creek Wind and Solar Farm	Lacour Energy	22.657°S 149.404°E	800	Expected late 2022	Proposed	Joint solar / wind project. Battery storage.
TAS	TasWind	Hydro Tasmania	39°52′S 143°59′E	600		Abandoned	
TAS	Western Plains Wind Farm	Epuron	40.724°S 145.261°E	40		Proposed	13 turbines.
QLD	Forest Wind	CleanSight and Siemens Financial Services	25.776°S 152.795°E	1200		Cancelled	
QLD	Forsayth Wind Farm	Infigen Energy	18.499°S 143.592°E	75		Proposed	
QLD	High Road Wind Farm	RATCH-Australia	17.60°S 145.47°E	80		Proposed	
QLD	Kaban Green Power Hub	Neoen	17.56°S 145.40°E	130		Proposed	100 MW of battery storage
QLD	Lakeland Wind Farm	Windlab	15.8°S 144.8°E	100		Proposed	
QLD	Archer Point Wind Farm	Wind Power Queensland	15.8°S 144.8°E	240		Proposed	
TAS	Robbins Island Wind Farm	UPC Renewables	40.685°S 144.926°E	340 (Stage 1)		Proposed	Up to 340 in stage 1, 1000 later
WA	Asian Renewable Energy Hub	Macquarie Group, CWP Energy Asia, Intercontinental Energy, Vestas	20°S 121°E	2600	2028 (first exports)	Proposed; environmental approval	Solar/wind to create green hydrogen, ammonia

== Solar ==
State	Project name	Sponsoring company	Coordinates	Capacity in MW	Commissioning date	Status	Notes
QLD	Clarke Creek Wind and Solar Farm	Lacour Energy	22.657°S 149.404°E	200-400		Proposed	Joint solar / wind project. Battery storage.
QLD	Bulli Creek Solar Farm	Solar Choice Sun Edison	27.996°S 150.855°E	2000		Proposed	Could become largest solar farm in the world when constructed.
QLD	Munna Creek Solar Farm	Renewable Energy System Technologies	25.87°S 152.46°E	120		Proposed	
QLD	Moranbah Solar Farm	Adani		170		Proposed	
QLD	Oakey Solar Farm (Stage 2)	Oakey 1 AssetCo Pty Ltd		55		Proposed	
QLD	Childers Solar Farm	ESCO Pacific		80		Proposed	
QLD	Rollingstone Solar Farm	ESCO Pacific		110		Proposed	
QLD	Aramara Solar Farm	Eco Energy World Australia		140		Proposed	
QLD	Kidston II	Genex Power		270		Proposed	
NSW	Jemalong Solar Farm	Genex Power	33°24′29″S 147°38′49″E	50	2021	Complete	Commissioned 2021
SA	Snowtown North	Tilt Renewables		45		Proposed	
WA	Waddi	Tilt Renewables		50		Proposed	
NSW	Beryl Solar Farm	New Energy Solar		100	June 2019	Complete	5 km west of Gulgong
NSW	Suntop Solar Farm	Photon Energy	32.5899°S 148.8305°E	170		Proposed	
NSW	Darlington Point	Edify Energy	34.673°S 146.027°E	300		Under construction	
NT	Australia-Asia Power Link	Sun Cable		6000		Proposed	
SA	Cultana Solar Farm	Simec Energy Australia	32.95°S 137.59°E	280	Expected end of 2020	Proposed	To be built (EPC) by Shanghai Electric as the first stage of a plan to power heavy industry with renewable energy
SA	Bungama Solar Farm	EPS Energy	33.19°S 138.09°E	280	Expected 2025	Proposed	East of Port Pirie
SA	Pallamana Solar Farm	RES	35.08°S 139.20°E	176	Expected Mid 2021	Proposed	Pallamana northwest of Murray Bridge. Received planning consent 23 July 2019.
WA	Asian Renewable Energy Hub	Macquarie Group, CWP Energy Asia, Intercontinental Energy, Vestas	20°S 121°E	up to 3.5 GW	Possibly 2026	Proposed	Undersea cable to southeast Asia and local mining industry intended as customers. Combined with wind farm.

== See also ==
- Wind power in Australia
- Solar power in Australia
- Coal mining in Australia
- Nuclear power in Australia
- Energy policy of Australia
- Effects of global warming on Australia
- List of power stations in Australia
