= List of wind farms in Western Australia =

This is a list of wind farms in Western Australia.

== Table ==
Project name	Sponsoring company	Coordinates	Capacity (MW)	Status	Notes
Albany Wind Farm	Bright Energy Investments	35.055217°S 117.784212°E	21	Operating	
Badgingarra Wind Farm	APA Group/[[]]	30.414825°S 115.328505°E	130	Operating	
Beros Rd Wind Farm	Blair Fox	29.962799°S 115.362548°E	9.5	Operating	
Collgar Wind Farm	Retail Employees Superannuation Trust	31.542388°S 118.456371°E	222	Operating	
Emu Downs Wind Farm	APA Group	30°30′0″S 115°20′0″E	79.2	Operating	
Karakin Wind Farm	Blair Fox	31.006451°S 115.464533°E	5	Operating	
Mount Barker Wind Farm	Mount Barker Power Company	34.601388°S 117.646283°E	2.4	Operating	
Mumbida Wind Farm	Synergy	28.991925°S 114.959478°E	55	Operating	
Nine Mile Beach		33.895126°S 121.780410°E	3.6	Operating	
Port Gregory Wind Farm	Advanced Energy Resources		2.5	Operating	
Ten Mile Lagoon		33.860281°S 121.742060°E	2.03	Operating	
Walkaway Wind Farm	Infigen Energy	28.922345°S 114.928107°E	89.1	Operating	
Warradarge Wind Farm	Bright Energy Investments	30.07°S 115.31°E	180.0	Operating	
Sumich West Hills Wind Farm	Blair Fox	30.870522°S 115.391245°E	5	Operating	
Yandin Wind Farm	Alinta Energy	30.726874°S 115.700226°E	214.2	Operating	
