= Verve Energy =

- Company type: State government owned
- Industry: Power generation
- Predecessor: Western Power
- Founded: 1 April 2006
- Fate: Merged with Synergy
- Successor: Synergy Generation
- Headquarters: Perth, Western Australia
- Area served: South-west of Western Australia
- Key people: Jason Waters (managing director)
- Services: Electricity generation
- Owner: Government of Western Australia
- Website: www.verveenergy.com.au

Verve Energy was a Western Australian Government owned corporation responsible for operating the state's electricity generators on the state's South West Interconnected System (SWIS).

It was split from the then vertically integrated Western Power Corporation in 2006, during reforms to the state's electricity sector. The company was merged into Synergy in 2014.

== Generators ==
Verve Energy owned five major power stations, supplying electricity to the South West Interconnected System:

- Muja Power Station, east of Collie
- Collie Power Station, in Collie
- Kwinana Power Station, in Naval Base heavy industrial suburb
- Cockburn Power Station, in Cockburn
- Pinjar Power Station, in Pinjar
- Mungarra Power Station

In addition it owned various other generation plants, including the Albany Wind Farm, wind diesel, and biomass facilities.
