= List of wind farms in Queensland =

This is a list of wind farms in Queensland, Australia. To be included on the list, a wind farm, must have a capacity of 10 megawatts (MW) or greater.

As of December 2023, Queensland has six operating wind farms with a total installed capacity of approximately 1025 MW.

== Operational ==
Project name	Sponsoring company	Coordinates	Capacity (MW)	Date	Notes
Coopers Gap	AGL Energy	26.55°S 151.33°E	453	2020; 6 years ago	$850 million investment, 123 turbines
Dulacca Wind Farm	Octopus Investments	26.80°S 150.27°E	181	2023; 3 years ago	$450 million investment, 43 turbines
Mount Emerald Wind Farm	RATCH-Australia; Port Bajool	17.2°S 145.4°E	180	2018; 8 years ago	$400 million investment, 53 turbines
Windy Hill Wind Farm	Built by Stanwell Corporation, now owned by RATCH-Australia	17.5922°S 145.5306°E	12	2000; 26 years ago	$20 million investment, 20 turbines
Kaban Green Power hub	Neoen	17.06°S 146.75°E	156	2023	Combined with 100 MW battery
Kennedy Energy Park Stage 1	Windlab	21°S 145°E	43	2021	Combined with 15 MW solar power and 2 MW / 4 MWh Battery.

== Projects ==
Project name	Sponsoring company	Coordinates	Capacity (MW)	Status	Notes
Archer Point Wind Farm	Wind Power Queensland	15.58°S 145.31°E	120	Feasibility	
Clarke Creek Wind Farm	Lacour	22.77°S 149.53°E	to be confirmed	Under construction	72 out of 100 turbines are complete as at February 2025.
Crediton Wind Farm	Transfield Services	21.215°S 148.540°E	40	Proposed	
Crows Nest Wind Farm	AGL Energy	27.230916°S 151.959666°E	200	Cancelled	$270 million investment, 40 turbines. Cancelled by AGL.
Forsayth Wind Farm	Infigen Energy	18°35′13″S 143°44′45″E	75	Planning approved	$250 million investment, 30 turbines
Forest Wind	CleanSight and Siemens Financial Services	25.776°S 152.795°E	1200	Planning approved	$2 billion investment, up to 226 turbines
High Road Wind Farm	Transfield Services	17.4923°S 145.4761°E	50	Planning approved	$90 million investment, 17 turbines
Kennedy Energy Park Stage 2	Windlab	21°S 145°E	43	Feasibility	Over $1.5 billion to construct, up to 300 wind turbines.
Kidston Wind Project	Genex Power	18.885°S 144.144°E	258	Feasibility	Expanded to 258MW in November 2022
North Stradbroke Island	Stanwell Corporation	27.555°S 153.460°E	15	Proposed	
Windy Hill Wind Farm Stage 2	Proposed by Transfield Services	17.5922°S 145.5306°E	12	Cancelled	
MacIntyre Wind Farm	Acciona & CleanCo	28.339°S 151.507°E	1026	Commissioned	Located in Cement Mills
MacIntyre Wind Farm Herries Range	Acciona	29.776°S 153.906°E	1000		
Lakeland Wind Farm	Windlab		100	Planning approved	
Banana Range Wind Farm	Lacour	24.5333°S 150.3158°E	230	Planning approved	Construction start expected Q1 2024
Kingaroy Wind Farm	Australia Energy Windfarm		57.12	Feasibility	

== See also ==
- List of power stations in Queensland
- Wind power in Australia
