= Western Power =

Western Power may represent:

- Western Power (networks corporation), a crown corporation of Western Australia, founded in 2006 from part of Western Power Corporation.
- Western Power Corporation, a crown corporation of Western Australia, founded in 1995 and reorganized in 2006 into Western Power and several other companies.
- Western Power Distribution, an American-owned UK-based energy distributor.
- the economic, military or political power of Western civilization

== See also ==
- Western alliance
- Western bloc
- Western world
