= State-owned enterprises of Australia =

Government business enterprises in Australia

In Australia, the predominant term used for state-owned enterprises (SOEs) is government business enterprise (GBE). Various Australian states and territories also have GBEs, especially with respect to the provision of municipal water and sewerage, and many GBEs were privatized in some states during the last decade of the 20th century. Former Commonwealth SOEs include Telstra, established in the 1970s as Telecom and now Australia's largest telecommunications company, was privatised in 1997 by the Howard government. As of June 2010, Telstra owned a majority of the copper wire infrastructure in Australia (while the rest is owned by Optus, formerly the government-owned AUSSAT and now a subsidiary of SingTel) and is pending sale to its former parent, the Australian government, for a non-binding amount of 11 billion Australian dollars, as ducts in the copper wire tunnels are needed to install the fibre optic cable. The Commonwealth Bank, as its name indicates, was also founded as public company before later being privatized.

In Victoria, many GBEs were sold in the 1990s by the Kennett ministry to reduce the level of state debt. The State Electricity Commission of Victoria and the Gas & Fuel Corporation were the best-known government enterprises to be disaggregated and sold.

== Australian Government ==
As of November 2025, there are ten GBEs of the Government of Australia, comprising two Corporate Commonwealth entities and eight Commonwealth companies.

- ASC
- Australian Naval Infrastructure
- Australia Post (corporate Commonwealth entity)
- Australian Rail Track Corporation
- CEA Technologies
- Defence Housing Australia (corporate Commonwealth entity)
- Moorebank Intermodal Company Limited
- NBN Co – fully owned and responsible for the rollout of the National Broadband Network
- Snowy Hydro
- WSA Co

The Government also has other public non-financial corporations (PFNCs) that are not prescribed as GBEs:

- Airservices Australia
- Australian Broadcasting Corporation
- Australian Government Solicitor
- Clean Energy Finance Corporation
- Future Fund
- Reserve Bank of Australia
- Screen Australia
- Special Broadcasting Service – fully owned, and combines government funding and commercial funding

== States and Territories ==
=== Australian Capital Territory ===
The GBEs of the Australian Capital Territory include:

- ActewAGL (50%)
- Icon Water

=== New South Wales ===
The statutory state-owned corporations of New South Wales include:

- Essential Energy
- Forestry Corporation of New South Wales
- Hunter Water
- Landcom
- Superannuation Administration Corporation
- Sydney Water
- Transport Asset Manager of New South Wales
- WaterNSW

=== Northern Territory ===
The GBEs of the Northern Territory include:

- PowerWater
- Territory Generation

=== Queensland ===
The GBEs of Queensland include:

- CS Energy
- Energex
- Ergon Energy
- Powerlink Queensland
- Gladstone Ports Corporation
- Port of Townsville
- Port of Mackay
- Queensland Investment Corporation
- Queensland Rail
- Stanwell Corporation
- SunWater
- Tarong Energy

=== South Australia ===
South Australia is notable for having very controversially privatized most of its GBEs:

- Adelaide Metro
- SA Water

=== Tasmania ===
Tasmania has a considerable amount of GBEs, relative to other states:

- Aurora Energy
- Forestry Tasmania
- Hydro Tasmania
- Irrigation Tasmania
- Metro Tasmania
- Motor Accidents Insurance Board
- Port Arthur Historic Site Management Authority
- Public Trustee
- Spirit of Tasmania
- TasCorp
- TasRail
- TasNetworks
- TasPorts
- TasWater

=== Victoria ===
The GBEs of Victoria include:

- Port of Hastings
- Port of Melbourne
- VicRoads
- VicTrack
- V/Line
- VITS LanguageLoop

=== Western Australia ===
The GBEs of Western Australian include:

- DevelopmentWA
- Fremantle Ports
- Gold Corporation
- Horizon Power
- Kimberley Ports
- Mid-West Ports
- Pilbara Ports
- Southern Ports
- Synergy
- Water Corporation
- Western Power
