= Goldfields Gas Pipeline =

Natural gas pipeline in Western Australia

Coordinates: 22.624826°S 116.19492°E

Location
- Country: Australia
- State: Western Australia
- Direction: north–south
- Start: Carnarvon Basin
- To: Kalgoorlie

General information
- Type: natural gas
- Owner: APA Group (88.2%); Alinta Energy (11.8%)
- Construction started: August 1995
- Commissioned: 1996

Technical information
- Length: 1,378 km (856 mi)

The Goldfields Gas Pipeline is a 1,378-kilometre (856 mi) natural gas transmission pipeline which transports natural gas from Carnarvon Basin producers in the north-west of Western Australia to Kalgoorlie in the south-east. The pipeline first transmitted gas in June 1996, and reached Kalgoorlie in September 1996. The Goldfields Gas Pipeline connects to the Newman Power Station (owned by APA Group) by a 47-kilometre (29 mi) lateral pipeline constructed in 1996.

The Goldfields Gas Pipeline is owned by the APA Group, which transports gas to its Newman Power Station.
