= Energy in Western Australia =

Economic sector in Western Australia

Western Australia, like other Australian states and high-income countries, is a heavy energy user by global standards.

The most distinctive features of Western Australia's energy systems are the massive export of natural gas, its independence from the interconnected cross-state gas and electricity networks in eastern Australia, and the presence of two separate large-scale grids and many microgrids to provide power for the sparsely populated state.

== Natural gas ==
Western Australia is the source of over 60% of Australia's natural gas, and over 80% of this production is exported as liquified natural gas. The vast majority of production is from offshore wells off the north-western coast of the state.

Domestic gas is piped to industry in the Pilbara and the major population centres in the south-west. There is, however, no pipeline connecting Western Australia's gas network to the eastern states of Australia.

Western Australia has a domestic gas reservation policy that requires gas exporters to make 15% of export production available for domestic consumption. The policy is generally agreed to reduce Western Australia's domestic gas prices. However, it is unclear whether the policy is economically beneficial overall, with some modelling (supported in part by Woodside Petroleum, a major gas producer) suggesting otherwise.

== Electricity ==
Electricity generation WA 2015-2021

Western Australia's size and remoteness have resulted in two completely separate large-scale energy grids in different parts of the state. Large parts of the state are too remote and sparsely populated to justify connection to the centralised grids.

=== History ===
The first demonstration of electric lighting in Western Australia took place in 1888, when Government House, Perth was lit with electricity supplied by Western Australian Electric Light & Power Co.

In 1894, the Perth Gas Company began to install electric lighting in Perth. Private companies in several other municipalities supplied power for electric lighting and trams. In 1912, the Perth Gas Company was acquired by the City of Perth, and electrification of the city's street lighting was completed by 1923.

Construction of the East Perth Power Station commenced in 1913 and it supplied power from December 1916. It used a frequency of 40 Hz.

In 1938, a Royal Commission was held to investigate the desirability of a centralised power grid for the southwest, supplied by a large coal-fired power station supplied by the Collie coal deposits. Reporting in 1940, the commission ultimately recommended against such a scheme.

In 1943, the State Electricity Commission of Western Australia was formed, and took over the Perth Gas Company operations by 1946. Generation and transmission was gradually centralised and expanded over this period, including the establishment of coal-fired power stations supplied by the Collie coalfields, conversion of AC power to the national standard of 50 Hz, high-voltage transmission lines, and eventually gas-fired power. 50 Hz turbo-alternators were installed at the then new South Fremantle Power Station, with the first two going on line during 1951. A frequency changer was installed at East Perth Power Station to allow conversion from 40 to 50 Hz and vice versa, and was used from 1951 until 1960, during which time the network was converted to use 50 Hz at all locations.

In 1994, gas and electricity was separated with the establishment of Western Power.

=== Present day structure ===
In the south-west of Western Australia, including the Perth metropolitan area, Western Power, a state-owned corporation operates the South West Interconnected System electricity grid. The SWIS is supplied by a combination of gas-fired, coal-fired, solar, wind, and tiny amounts of hydroelectricity generation.

Outside the SWIS, grid services are supplied by Horizon Power, another state-owned corporation. The Pilbara mining region is supplied by the North West Interconnected System. Privately owned mining companies are major participants in this electricity grid. The majority of generation on this grid is currently gas-fired.

There is a third, small interconnected grid (including the Ord River Hydro Power Station) in the far north of the state, and 34 additional microgrids operated by Horizon Energy supplying power to towns in the remoter parts of the state.

== Oil ==
Western Australia produces nearly 80% of Australia's petroleum and LPG, as a relatively minor product from the offshore gas fields.

However, Western Australia has no local oil refineries, with the closure of BP's Kwinana refinery in 2021. The Kwinana refinery site now acts as a petroleum import terminal.
