= Wagerup Power Station =

Power station in Western Australia

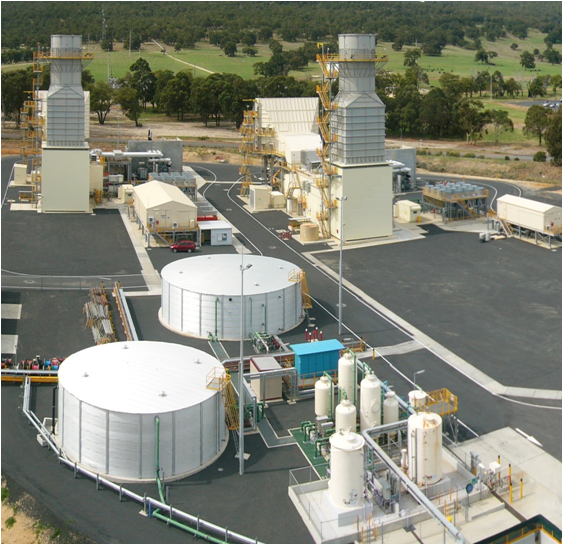
- Country: Australia
- Location: Wagerup, Western Australia
- Coordinates: 32°54′58″S 115°55′07″E
- Status: Operational
- Owner: Alinta Energy

Thermal power station
- Primary fuel: Natural gas

Power generation
- Nameplate capacity: 380 MW

Wagerup Power Station is a 380 MW dual natural gas and distillate-fuelled power station located at Alcoa’s Wagerup refinery in south-west Western Australia. Located about 130 km south of Perth, on the border of Western Australia’s Peel and South West regions, the Power Station is four kilometres north of Yarloop and 13 km south of Waroona. Wagerup is only operated when there is insufficient capacity in the South West Interconnected System to meet high demand.

Two open system gas turbines commenced operations at Wagerup in October 2007.

== See also ==
- Alinta Energy
