= Warradarge Wind Farm =

Wind farm in Western Australia

- Country: Australia
- Location: Warradarge
- Coordinates: 29°58′48″S 115°29′24″E
- Status: Operational
- Construction began: 2019
- Commission date: August 2020
- Construction cost: A$500m
- Owner: Bright Energy Investments
- Operator: Vestas
- Employees: 6

Wind farm
- Type: Onshore
- Hub height: 84 metres (276 ft)
- Rotor diameter: 136 metres (446 ft)

Power generation
- Units operational: 51 × 3.6 MW
- Make and model: Vestas V136
- Units under const.: 51 × 3.6 MW
- Nameplate capacity: 183.6 MW
- Capacity factor: 38%

External links
- Website: www.brightenergyinvestments.com.au/warradarge-wind-farm-1

Warradarge Wind Farm is located 15 kilometres (9.3 mi) northeast of Warradarge, and 30 kilometres (19 mi) southeast of Eneabba in the Mid West region of Western Australia. Construction commenced in 2019 and the first of its planned 51 turbines was completed on 21 January 2020. The wind farm has been operational since August 2020.

It is owned by Bright Energy Investments, a joint venture between the Dutch fund manager DIF Capital Partners (40.05%), Australian industry superannuation fund Cbus (40.05%), and the Western Australian government's electricity generator and retailer Synergy (19.9%). The construction and maintenance contracts are with Danish company Vestas.

Originally proposed in 2012 for up to 100 turbines generating 250 MW of electricity, the wind farm was completed in 2020 with 51 turbines, capable of generating up to 180 MW for the South West Interconnected System, the electricity grid in southern Western Australia, equivalent to providing power for 144,000 homes.

The wind turbines are manufactured by Vestas with 66 metre blades and a tip height of 152 metres above the ground. Western Power constructed a 10 kilometres (6.2 mi) transmission line from the wind farm to the existing 330 kV transmission network near Eneabba.

In 2023 funding was announced for a potential expansion of the wind farm.

== Operations ==
Operations began in August 2020. The generation table uses AEMO Facility SCADA to obtain generation values for each month. Warradarge's code is WARRADARGE_WF1. A SUMIF operation is used on the data published by AEMO to get the total (shown in the table below). Each month's values start 8 hours into the respective month and extend 8 hours into the next month, in line with the trading day defined in the Wholesale Energy Market Rules.

Warradarge Wind Farm Generation (MWh)
Year	Total	Jan	Feb	Mar	Apr	May	Jun	Jul	Aug	Sep	Oct	Nov	Dec
2020	197,134	N/A	N/A	N/A	N/A	N/A	N/A	N/A	7,131	31,244	37,146	54,546	67,067
2021	604,089	63,260	68,094	55,782	23,891	45,563	44,096	51,823	45,202	45,636	46,432	48,168	66,141
