= Collie Power Station =

Power station in Collie, Western Australia

- Country: Australia
- Location: Collie, Western Australia
- Coordinates: 33°20′31″S 116°15′43″E
- Status: Operational
- Commission date: 4 June 1999
- Decommission date: 2027 (planned)
- Owner: Synergy

Thermal power station
- Primary fuel: Coal

Power generation
- Nameplate capacity: 340 MW

External links
- Website: www.synergy.net.au

Collie Power Station is a power station in Collie, Western Australia. It is coal powered with one steam turbine that generates a total capacity of 300 megawatts of electricity. The coal is mined locally from the Collie Sub-basin and is transported to the power plant by overland conveyor. In June 2022, the Government of Western Australia announced that Synergy would close Collie Power Station by 2027.

Built by the Clough Group, the station was commissioned in 1999 with a single 300 megawatts steam turbine. Power generated by the station supplies the south-west of Australia through the South West Interconnected System (SWIS) operated by Western Power.

In the financial year of 2008/2009, the station consumed approximately 1 million tonnes (2.2 billion pounds) of coal. Carbon Monitoring for Action estimates that, in 2009, Collie Power Station emitted 2.59 million tonnes (5.7 billion pounds) of CO_{2} to generate 2.3 terawatt-hours (8.3 petajoules) of electricity.

In household consumer terms, this equates to 1.13 kilograms (2.5 lb) of CO_{2} emitted for each one kilowatt-hour (kWh), or 3.6 megajoules, of electricity produced and fed into the electricity grid. That is, Collie Power Station emits slightly less CO_{2} per kilowatt-hour of electricity produced than nearby closing Muja Power Station (1.14 kilograms or 2.5 pounds) but more than also nearby Bluewaters Power Station (0.825 kilograms or 1.82 pounds) based on estimates for the same year.

The 2240 MWh / 560 MW (4-hour) Collie grid battery started full operation in August 2025. Another battery is also being built at the site; a 219 MW / 877 MWh (4-hour) to reduce the solar duck curve. A third battery, at 200 MW with a 66 MW solar park, was approved in 2025.
