= Bright Energy Investments =

Western Australian renewable electricity generator company

- Founded: April 2018

Bright Energy Investments (BEI) is a joint venture between Western Australian state-owned electricity generator and retailer Synergy, global infrastructure investment fund DIF, and Australian industry superannuation fund Cbus. It develops and owns solar and wind farms for electricity on the South West Interconnected System, the main Western Australian electricity grid.

== Generation ==
Assets owned by BEI include:

- Albany Grasmere Wind Farm
- Greenough River Solar Farm
- Warradarge Wind Farm (expected to start generating in 2020)

== See also ==
- List of renewable energy companies by country
