= Pinjarra Power Station =

Power station in Western Australia

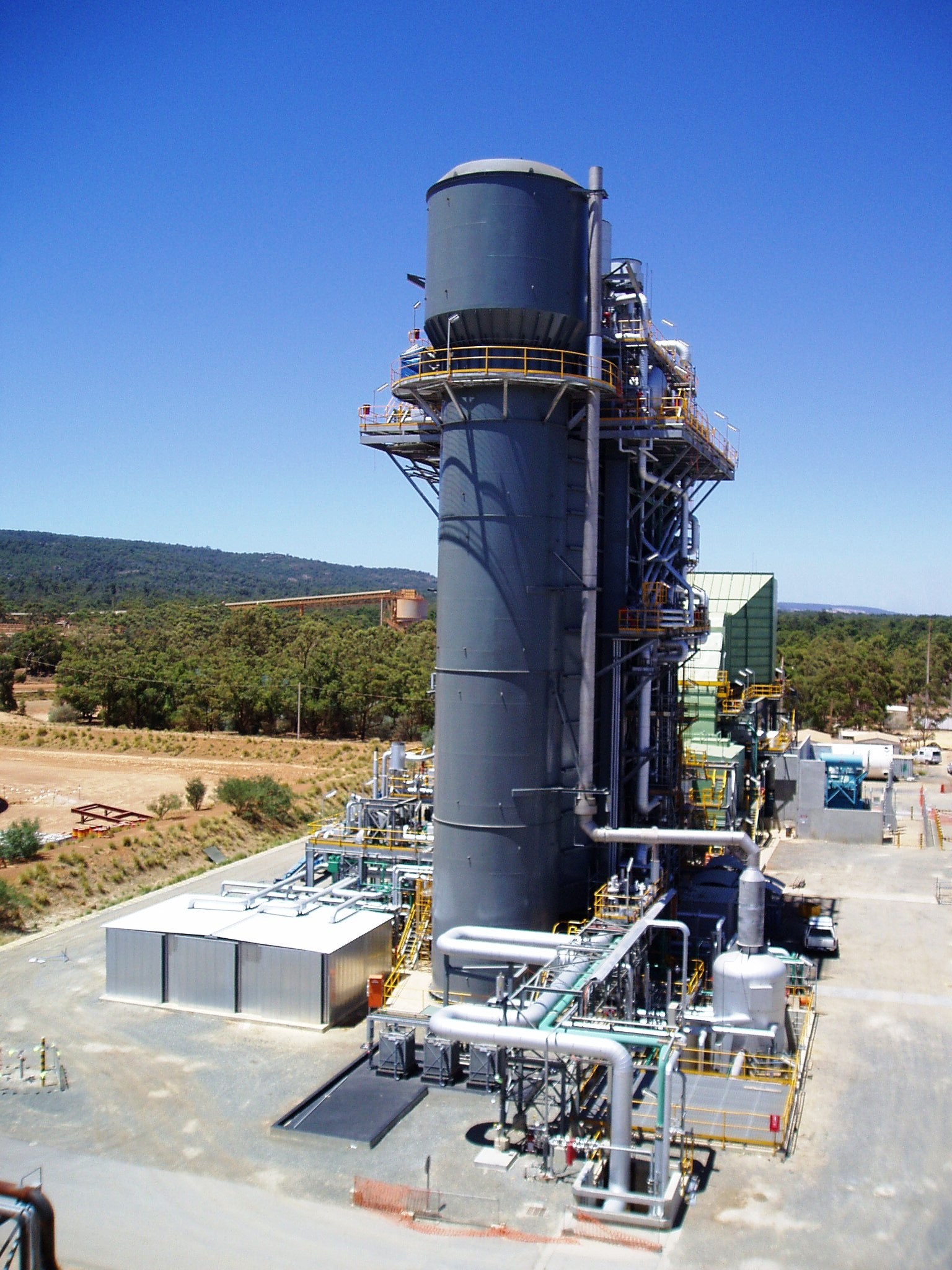
- Country: Australia
- Location: Shire of Murray
- Coordinates: 32°38′48″S 115°56′48″E
- Status: Operational
- Commission date: 2006
- Owner: Alinta Energy
- Operator: Alinta Energy

Thermal power station
- Primary fuel: Natural gas
- Cogeneration?: Yes

Power generation
- Units operational: 2 x 140 MW
- Make and model: MHI
- Nameplate capacity: 280 MW

Pinjarra Power Station is a natural-gas-fired power station in Western Australia. It is a 280 MW base load cogeneration power station located in Alcoa's Pinjarra Alumina Refinery, near the town of Pinjarra, approximately 80 km south of Perth. Generated electricity is sold by Alinta Energy to contracted customers or into the Wholesale Energy Market. In addition to electricity, the power station supplies steam to Alcoa's refinery.
