= Energy Club WA =

Energy industry professional network in Western Australia

- Formation: 1966
- Type: Not-for-profit membership association
- Headquarters: Perth, Western Australia
- Region served: Western Australia
- Members: c. 730 (2025)
- President: Jop van Hattum
- General Manager: Kate McCarthy
- Website: energyclub.org.au
- Formerly called: Petroleum Club of Western Australia (1966–2021)

Energy Club WA (known as the Petroleum Club of Western Australia from 1966 to 2021) is a not-for-profit, membership-based professional network for people working in the energy industry in Western Australia. Based in Perth, it holds monthly industry dinners with guest speakers and panels, and runs a schools education program, industry seminars, a young professionals program and annual industry awards. Membership is open to individuals across all parts of the industry and its associated service providers, rather than to companies. The club adopted its current name in 2021, following a vote of members, to reflect the broadening of the state's energy sector beyond oil and gas.

== History ==
=== Background and founding ===
Formal petroleum exploration in Western Australia began after the Second World War. West Australian Petroleum (WAPET), formed by Caltex and Ampol, made the state's first oil discovery at Rough Range in 1953 and found commercial oil on Barrow Island in 1964. Nationally, the Australian Petroleum Exploration Association (APEA, now Australian Energy Producers) was formed in 1959, and it established the APEA Petroleum Club in 1963 to host regular industry meetings.

In 1966, individuals and companies in Western Australia held a planning meeting at the Adelphi Hotel in Perth to form a local club, named the Petroleum Club of Western Australia. Meetings were set for the second Tuesday of each month, and the first formal meeting was held on 10 January 1967. The inaugural Board of Governors comprised President Vaughan Boalch, Vice Presidents Doug Gray and John Geary, Secretary Daryl Johnstone and Treasurer Chester Smith.

Early meetings, held at the building complex of the Esplanade Hotel, typically drew 50 to 90 members and featured an industry speaker or film. An approach to the minerals industry to broaden the club's membership did not proceed.

=== 1970s to 1990s ===
Declining support led to a low point in late 1970, when only six people attended a meeting. The Board responded by repositioning the club as an informal and open organisation, and meetings moved to the WA Rugby Union Club at Perry Lakes. Corporate support in this period came from Shell, WAPET and Burmah Oil Company of Australia (BOCAL). The industry slowed in the early 1970s under the resource policies of federal minister Rex Connor, before the North West Shelf Project began domestic gas supply in 1984 and liquefied natural gas (LNG) exports to Japan in 1989.

In 1988 the club moved its monthly meetings from the Rugby Club to city venues, later settling at the Parmelia Hilton, and marked its 21st anniversary with a black-tie dinner in March 1988. Pamela Palmer became the first woman to serve as President, in 1993–94. During the late 1990s the Board recruited representatives from major operators, including Woodside, Chevron and Apache, to balance a membership that had been drawn largely from contractors and drilling companies. Membership grew from about 230 in the mid-1990s to about 400 by the end of the decade, and the club engaged a paid administrator, later expanded to a permanent secretariat.

A "Future of the Petroleum Club" committee formed in 1999 led to a revised constitution, improved corporate governance, preparation for the introduction of the Goods and Services Tax, and a contracted secretariat.

=== 2000s and the LNG construction boom ===
In 2003 the club commissioned a history, The Petroleum Club of Western Australia 1966–2003, introduced online event registration and began an annual sailing regatta at the Royal Perth Yacht Club.

The LNG construction boom of the late 2000s and early 2010s, which included the Pluto, Gorgon, Wheatstone, Ichthys and Prelude projects, increased attendance at club dinners to between 300 and 400 people, and the dinners moved from the Parmelia Hilton to the Hyatt Regency. Following a sponsor audit of the club's finances, the Board undertook governance and financial reforms between 2008 and 2012, including requiring the schools program to be funded by sponsorship rather than general club revenue.

=== Downturn and governance reform (2014–2019) ===
The fall in oil prices from late 2014 reduced attendance and sponsorship, and by 2015 the club faced the possibility of closure. The Board responded by strengthening its speaker program, introducing a multi-sponsor model for industry dinners, and forming a Young Professionals Committee to attract early-career members. The club marked its 50th anniversary in 2016 and adopted a new logo.

Following the commencement of Western Australia's Associations Incorporation Act 2015 in July 2016, the club amended its constitution, introduced a member dispute resolution procedure and a code of conduct, and moved its annual general meeting from September to March to align with its financial year. From 2017 the Board also adopted a diversity strategy, including targets for female representation on the Board.

In July 2018, Quadrant Energy executive Fred Wehr first described the Dorado oil discovery in the Bedout Sub-basin at a club industry dinner, the evening before joint venture partner Carnarvon Petroleum announced it to the Australian Securities Exchange.

=== Change of name (2021) ===
In 2019 the Board began an 18-month review of the club's identity, engaging The Brand Agency to conduct market research, member surveys and workshops. At the annual general meeting on 31 March 2021, members voted on motions to change the club's name and update its constitution. According to the club, about 70 per cent of members took part in the ballot and 92 per cent of those voting supported the change. The name Energy Club WA and a new logo were launched in April 2021.

=== COVID-19 pandemic ===
As the club depends on event and sponsorship income, the COVID-19 pandemic halted most of its revenue in 2020. The club drew on financial reserves built up after 2018, received wage subsidies and moved its events online. After restrictions eased, an industry dinner on hydrogen in August 2021 recorded an attendance of more than 550 people.

=== Since 2021 ===
In June 2021, the club and Subsea Energy Australia held a fundraising quiz night at the Perth Convention and Exhibition Centre for communities in Timor-Leste affected by Cyclone Seroja, raising A$70,275 for in-country charities. In 2024 the club began an Indigenous business networking program, later the First Nations Business Showcase Series, connecting Aboriginal and Torres Strait Islander-owned businesses with energy companies. The club celebrated its 60th anniversary in 2026 with the publication of Connecting People with Energy..

== Activities ==
=== Industry events ===
The club's principal activity is its monthly industry dinner, featuring keynote speakers or panels drawn from operators, service companies, regulators, government and research firms. Speakers have included Western Australian premiers Sir Charles Court and Richard Court (at the 2003 annual general meeting), Colin Barnett, Mark McGowan and Roger Cook, and federal resources minister Madeleine King, who used a March 2025 address to the club to set out the federal government's gas policy. Statements made at club events are regularly reported in the industry press, including warnings on energy policy by Beach Energy chief executive Brett Woods in May 2025 and Santos's plans for the removal of the Harriet Alpha platform in 2026.

Other regular events include a January Industry Outlook sundowner, held since 2020 with presentations from Rystad Energy; an annual Gala Ball organised jointly with the Western Australian section of the Society of Petroleum Engineers; an annual golf day; International Women's Day events; and informal member meet-and-greet gatherings. During the 2010s the club and Santos co-hosted an annual charity quiz night in support of Homelessness Connect Perth. The club coordinates its event calendar with other Perth industry bodies, including Subsea Energy Australia, the Society of Petroleum Engineers and the Society for Underwater Technology.

=== Schools program ===
The club established the Schools Information Program (SIP) in the early 1990s with four schools, aiming to increase Year 10 students' understanding of the petroleum industry. Industry volunteers delivered classroom presentations on exploration, drilling, production and transportation, and participating schools completed team projects judged by industry representatives. In its first 12 years, 53 government and non-government secondary schools took part, with 7,279 students preparing 1,564 projects. Kent Street Senior High School teacher Suzy Urbaniak, who used the program as a model for her Centre of Resources Excellence (CoRE) learning approach, received the 2016 Prime Minister's Prize for Excellence in Science Teaching in Secondary Schools.

In 2012 the program was relaunched as the Next Generation Energy Program, funded by partner sponsorship and broadened to cover renewable as well as conventional energy and the full range of careers in the sector. It is delivered through a series of school visits by industry volunteers, supplemented by careers expos and forums, and in 2025 reached more than 1,800 students in metropolitan and regional schools. Sponsors of the program have included Woodside Energy, ExxonMobil and INPEX. The club reported 20 participating schools for 2026.

In September 2026 the program was among at least 260 fossil fuel industry-sponsored education initiatives identified in a report by the climate advocacy group Comms Declare, as reported by ABC News. A former science teacher at Busselton Senior High School told the ABC that the sessions took class time without consultation and presented gas as central to the energy transition, with renewable energy covered mainly in the final session. In response, the club's general manager said the content was reviewed by participating schools, that a classroom teacher was present at every session, and that sponsors had no role in developing or reviewing the program's content.

=== Seminars and professional development ===
The club runs a one-day Introduction to the Energy Industry seminar (originally Introduction to Petroleum) for new entrants, students and support staff, and a one-day Energy Transition seminar. It also operates a mentoring program pairing young professionals with senior industry members.

=== Awards ===
The Energy Industry Awards are presented annually. They include the Member of the Year award (introduced in 2021), the Brooke Arnot Excellence Award for young professionals (named after a former governor), and awards for field team excellence, innovation, inclusion, and sustainability and net-zero leadership.

== Membership and governance ==
Membership is held by individuals. Categories include general, Young Professional (for members under 35), and complimentary one-year student membership offered in collaboration with local universities. Membership reached about 730 in 2025. Women made up less than 5 per cent of members in the mid-2010s and about 23 per cent by 2026.

The club is governed by a volunteer Board of Governors led by a President, Vice President, Treasurer and Secretary, supported by a small paid staff led by a General Manager. Its policies include a code of conduct and policies on diversity and inclusion, financial management, privacy, risk management, sponsorship and working with children. The club has awarded honorary life membership since 1989.

== Presidents ==
#	President	Term
1	Vaughan Boalch	1967–1968
2	Newt Duncan	1968–1969
3	Laurie Sharp	1969–1970
4	Phil Hicks	1970
5	Ken Cohen	1970–1971
6	John Chater	1971–1972
7	Derek Evans	1972–1974
8	Bill Aberle	1974–1975
9	Brian Bishop	1975–1977
10	Bill Foster	1977–1978
11	Bill Gardner	1978–1980
12	Alan Barker	1980–1982
13	Peter Glass	1982–1984
14	Geoff Palmer	1984–1986
15	Shaun Smith	1986–1988
16	Richard Self	1988–1989
17	Chris Prattini	1989–1990
18	Bruce McCarthy	1990–1993
19	Pamela Palmer	1993–1994
20	Ken Sample	1994–1996
21	James Liddell	1996–1997
22	Richard Clark	1997
23	Stephen Keenihan	1997–1998
24	Grant Franklyn	1998–1999
25	Keith Binns	1999–2000
26	Ivan Bristow	2000–2001
27	Eve Howell	2001–2002
28	Ted Graham	2002–2003
29	Sarah Duke	2003–2004
30	Ivan Bristow	2004–2005
31	Jonathon Silbert	2005–2006
32	Derrick O'Keeffe	2006–2008
33	Marie Malaxos	2008–2009
34	Peter Hay	2009–2010
35	Carol Pearce	2010–2011
36	Marie Malaxos	2011–2012
37	Mark Small	2012–2013
38	Gordon Trotter	2013–2014
39	Jo Flowerdew	2014–2015
40	Rick Nardi	2015–2016
41	Mark Small	2016–2017
42	Paul Stone	2017–2019
43	Colby Hauser	2019–2021
44	Dario Bongiovanni	2021–2023
45	Bernadette Cullinane	2023–2025
46	Jop van Hattum	2025–present

== See also ==
- Petroleum industry in Australia
- Energy in Western Australia
- Australian Energy Producers
- Society of Petroleum Engineers
