= Kwinana Cogeneration Plant =

Steam and power station in Perth, Western Australia

- Country: Australia
- Location: Kwinana Beach
- Coordinates: 32°13′23″S 115°45′59″E
- Status: Operational
- Construction began: 1994
- Commission date: December 1996
- Owners: Engie; Mitsui & Co.; RATCH-Australia

Thermal power station
- Primary fuel: Natural gas
- Turbine technology: Gas turbine; Steam turbine
- Combined cycle?: Yes
- Cogeneration?: Yes

Power generation
- Nameplate capacity: 120 MW

Kwinana Cogeneration Plant was a cogeneration facility located 40 kilometres (25 mi) south of Perth, Western Australia that operated from 1996 until 2021. It provided steam and electrical power to BP's Kwinana Oil Refinery and electricity to Synergy.

As a cogeneration plant, Kwinana supplied both steam and electrical power to its two customers. Steam production from the plant came predominantly from the waste heat from the gas turbine exhausts and was supported by burning refinery fuel gas from the oil refinery using 'Duct Burners' inside the heat recovery steam generators. The steam produced drove a steam turbine, further enhancing the plant's efficiency, with BP's steam supply coming from the extraction port on the steam turbine after some pressure and temperature had been lost.

Kwinana produced 119 MW of electricity, or approximately 6% of Western Australia's requirements. It was primarily fueled by natural gas from Western Australia's North West Shelf gas fields and delivered to the plant by the Dampier to Bunbury Natural Gas Pipeline.

== History ==
Edison Mission Energy commenced construction of the plant in 1994. It was commissioned in December 1996.

The final owners of the Kwinana plant were GDF Suez, Mitsui & Co and RATCH-Australia. The partnership traded as the Perth Power Partnership, with GDF Suez and Mitsui & Co owning a combined 70% and RATCH-Australia 30%.

The plant ceased operation in 2021 and was deregistered from the Western Australian electricity market in March 2022.
