= Toora Wind Farm =

Wind power station in Victoria, Australia

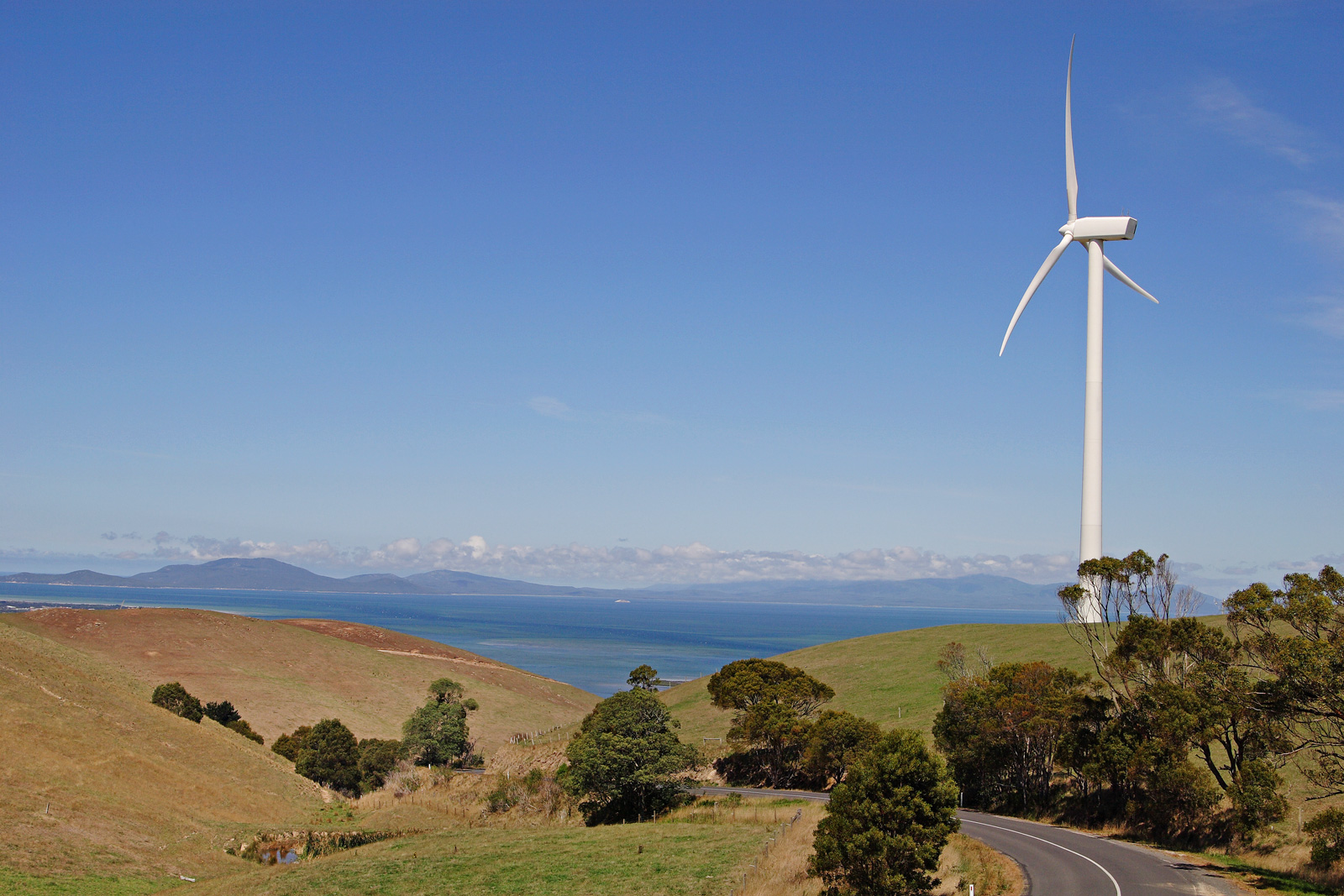
- Turbine overlooking the promontory
- Country: Australia
- Coordinates: 38°38′41″S 146°20′49″E
- Owner: RATCH-Australia
- Operator: RATCH-Australia

Wind farm
- Type: Onshore
- Hub height: 67 m (220 ft)
- Rotor diameter: 66 m (217 ft)

Power generation
- Units operational: 12 × 1.75 MW
- Make and model: Vestas Vestas V66 (12)
- Nameplate capacity: 21 MW

Toora Wind Farm is a wind power station at Toora in South Gippsland, Victoria, Australia. It is located north of Wilsons Promontory and 150 km south-east of Melbourne. The wind farm is on a ridge overlooking the town of Toora.

Toora has 12 wind turbines, each of 1.75 MW rated capacity, with a total generating capacity of 21 MW of electricity. Vestas Wind Systems completed the power station in 2002.

In November 2007, Transfield Services Infrastructure Fund acquired the wind farm from the Government of Queensland. Transfield Services Infrastructure Fund became RATCH-Australia on 11 July 2011.

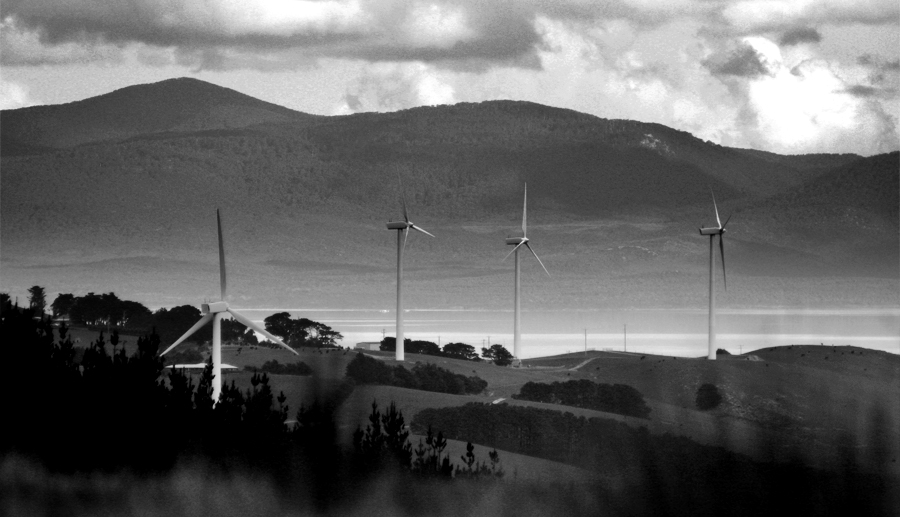
Overview of the wind farm

Viewing and photography points are available on a road that passes the wind farm. From some of these views of the coastal plain, the Strzelecki Ranges, and Wilsons Promontory can be combined with views of the turbines. Accommodation is available in a caravan park at Toora.

One of Toora's turbines can power up to 6,600 homes.
