= Greenough River Solar Farm =

Photovoltaic power station in Western Australia

- Country: Australia
- Location: Walkaway, Western Australia
- Coordinates: 28°54′14″S 115°06′19″E
- Status: Operational
- Construction began: 2012
- Commission date: August 2012
- Owner: Bright Energy Investments

Solar farm
- Type: Flat-panel PV
- Collectors: 150,000
- Site area: 50 hectares (120 acres)

Power generation
- Nameplate capacity: 40 MW

The Greenough River Solar Farm is a 40 megawatt (MW) photovoltaic power station located in Walkaway, Western Australia. When it opened in October, 2012, it was the country's first utility-scale solar farm. It remained Australia's largest solar PV system until 2014, when it was superseded by the 20 MW Royalla solar farm in Canberra. The Greenough River Solar Farm was built by Verve Energy and joint venture partners GE Financial Services. It uses over 150,000 thin film modules based on CdTe-PV technology provided by U.S. company First Solar. Its exact location is at Nangetty Walkaway Road, Walkaway, 50 kilometres southeast of Geraldton and covers an area of 80 hectares (200 acres).

The solar farm has been owned by Bright Energy investments since April 2018. It is currently undergoing and expansion to increase capacity by a further 30MW and RCR Tomlinson was awarded a $60 million engineering, construction and procurement contract for expansion, The expansion project is expected to be complete by mid 2019.

== See also ==
- Photovoltaics
- Solar power in Australia
