= Port Hedland Power Station =

Power station in Western Australia

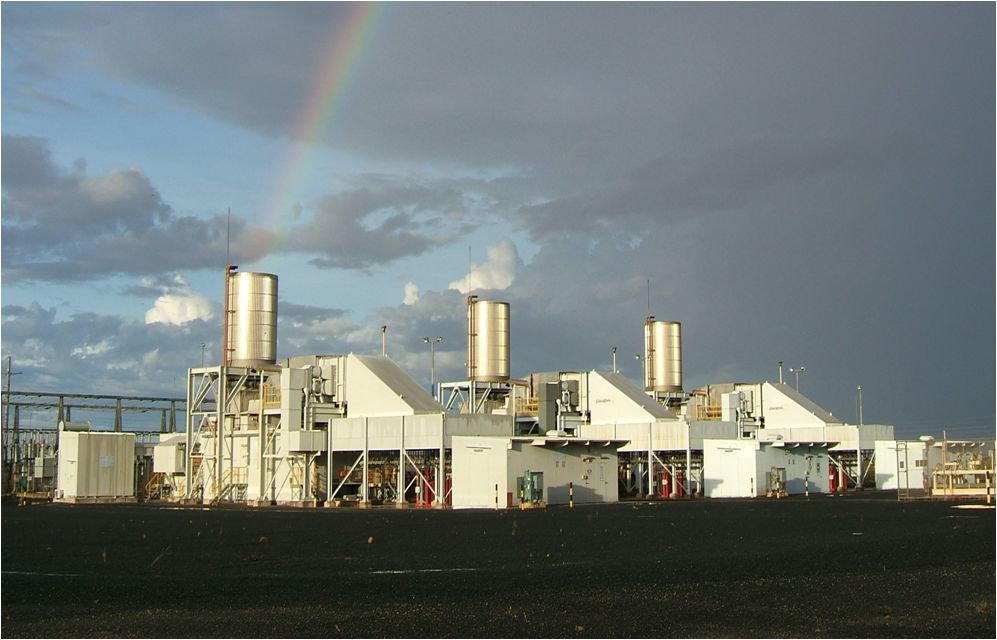
- Port Hedland Power Station
- Country: Australia
- Location: Port Hedland
- Coordinates: 20°25′30″S 118°32′40″E
- Status: Operational
- Commission date: Three dual fuel units commissioned in 1995; two additional units commissioned in 1998
- Owner: Alinta Energy
- Operator: Alinta Energy

Thermal power station
- Primary fuel: Natural gas
- Cogeneration?: Yes

Power generation
- Units operational: 5 x 42 MW gas-fired turbine units, 45 MW solar, battery
- Nameplate capacity: 210 MW

Port Hedland Power Station is a power station in Western Australia owned by APA Group.

It consists of five 42 MW natural gas-fired turbine units located in two separate locations: two units are located at the BHP hot briquetted iron plant at Boodarie (which has been decommissioned); and three units are located in a standalone facility at Port Hedland, connected by a 66 kV transmission line. The assets are operated from a central control point allowing them to operate as an integrated plant and Port Hedland is connected to the North West Interconnected System.

Three dual fuel units were commissioned in 1995; two additional units were subsequently commissioned in 1998. A 45 MW solar PV with a 36 MWh battery opened in 2024.

== See also ==
- APA Group
