= Cockburn Power Station =

Power station in Perth, Western Australia

- Country: Australia
- Location: Naval Base
- Coordinates: 32°12′01″S 115°46′27″E
- Status: Operational
- Commission date: 2003
- Owners: Synergy; Verve Energy; WPC
- Operator: Synergy

Thermal power station
- Primary fuel: Natural gas
- Combined cycle?: Yes

Power generation
- Units operational: 1 × 80 MW; 1 × 160 MW
- Make and model: Alstom GT13E2 (1) steam turbine (1)
- Nameplate capacity: 240 MW

Cockburn Power Station (CKB) is a power station in Naval Base, Western Australia within the City of Kwinana. The station was commissioned by Western Power Corporation in 2003 and is immediately south of the closed Kwinana Power Station. It has a 160 MW natural gas powered Alstom GT13E2 gas turbine which provides steam to an 80 MW steam turbine that together generate a total 240 MW of electricity. It was the first combined cycle gas turbine power station in Western Australia. It came under the control of Verve Energy in 2006 when Western Power was split, and since 2014 has been under control of Synergy.
