= Roma Power Station =

Peaking power station

- Country: Australia
- Location: Roma, Queensland
- Coordinates: 26°34′38″S 148°50′24″E
- Commission date: 1999
- Owner: Origin Energy

Thermal power station
- Primary fuel: Natural gas

The Roma Power Station is a peaking power station in Roma, South West Queensland, Australia. It has a maximum capacity of 80 megawatts. Operations began 3 June 1999.

== Old power station ==
The connection of local natural gas suppliers to the old power station was Australia's first commercial gas project. It began operations in 1961.

== See also ==
- List of active power stations in Queensland
- List of natural gas power stations in Australia
