= Collgar Wind Farm =

Wind farm in Western Australia

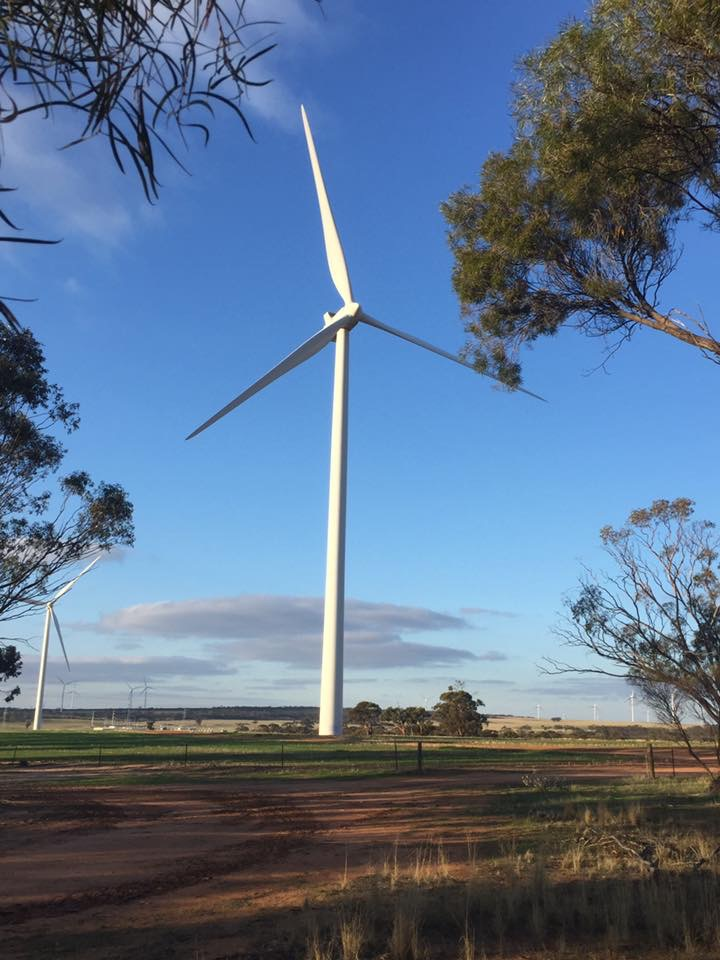
- Collgar Wind Farm in 2019
- Collgar Wind Farm in Australia
- Country: Australia
- Location: Near Merredin
- Coordinates: 31°32′35″S 118°27′16″E
- Status: Operational
- Construction began: June 2010
- Commission date: March 2012
- Construction cost: A$750m
- Owner: Rest Super
- Operator: COLLGAR WIND FARM PTY LTD

Thermal power station
- Primary fuel: Wind energy

Wind farm
- Type: Onshore
- Hub height: 80 metres (262 ft)
- Rotor diameter: 90 metres (295 ft)
- Site area: 18,000 hectares (180.00 km^{2})

Power generation
- Units operational: 111 × 2.0 MW
- Make and model: Vestas V90-2MW
- Nameplate capacity: 222 MW
- Capacity factor: 34.24% (average 2012-2020)
- Annual net output: 665.8 GWh (average 2012-2020)

External links
- Website: [www.collgarwindfarm.com.au]
- Commons: Related media on Commons

The Collgar Wind Farm is a wind farm located approximately 25 kilometres south-east of Merredin, Western Australia. It is operated by Collgar Renewables. With 111 Vestas V90-2MW wind turbines, and a total installed capacity of 222 MW registered with AEMO, it is Western Australia's largest wind farm. It became fully operational in October 2011 and is expected to generate 750 GWh per year on average over the 30-year life of the project.

== History ==
Feasibility studies were carried out between 2006 and 2008, and planning approval was granted in September 2008. In March 2010 the wind farm was sold to the UBS International Infrastructure Fund and Rest Super and in June 2019, Rest Super became the sole shareholder.

Construction began in June 2010, the wind farm was connected to the grid in April 2011, and the first 50 turbines started operation in May 2011. The wind farm became fully operational in October 2011.

While Collgar's wind turbines were initially de-rated to 1.856 MW, limiting output to 206 MW, they were returned to their design capacity of 2.0 MW during March and April 2020, increasing output to the current 222 MW.

From 2011 to 2026, the power was sold to Synergy. From 2027 to 2042, the power is sold to the Boddington gold mine.

== Operations ==
AEMO records begin in June 2011 for the wind farm. The generation table uses AEMO Facility SCADA to obtain generation values for each month. Collgar's code is INVESTEC_COLLGAR_WF1, so that is used as part of a SUMIF operation (shown below) on the table to get the total. Note that each month's values start 8 hours into the respective month and extend 8 hours into the next month.

=SUMIF(E2:E Last Row,"*INVESTEC_COLLGAR_WF1*",F2:F Last Row)

Collgar Wind Farm Generation (MWh)
Year	Total	Jan	Feb	Mar	Apr	May	Jun	Jul	Aug	Sep	Oct	Nov	Dec
2011	287,225	N/A	N/A	N/A	N/A	N/A	14,614*	26,360*	31,306*	46,699*	53,002*	58,121	57,123
2012	640,200	66,373	56,733	67,198	50,610	47,758	53,930	13,487*	44,554	61,583	68,524	56,789	52,661
2013	647,963	67,685	57,569	52,933	33,712	45,245	37,273	47,667	56,082	61,154	53,857	72,971	61,815
2014	679,954	71,733	65,506	62,400	40,677	38,987	51,386	54,859	53,317	57,979	55,815	58,518	68,777
2015	681,676	76,184	48,963	49,333	62,347	53,540	55,564	47,088	52,165	55,576	56,859	55,722	68,335
2016	671,039	62,672	65,039	68,050	50,132	33,708	41,450	58,669	54,861	49,771	65,709	53,228	67,750
2017	659,380	60,082	63,272	61,459	44,549	41,218	43,654	59,908	57,077	43,134	62,263	62,389	60,375
2018	679,894	76,105	56,132	66,050	42,218	63,290	37,984	66,252	58,378	46,871	56,306	53,382	56,926
2019	660,021	63,699	56,889	58,262	58,831	44,249	62,698	44,437	55,378	48,264	54,667	58,579	54,068
2020	672,377	61,484	69,644	55,677	42,007	54,245	55,691	55,141	56,439	46,360	58,293	51,588	65,808

Note: Asterisk indicates power output was limited during the month.

== See also ==
- List of wind farms in Western Australia
