= Kennedy Energy Park =

Power station in Queensland, Australia

- Country: Australia
- Coordinates: 20.876°S 144.42°E
- Status: Operational
- Construction began: 2018
- Commission date: 2023
- Owner: Windlab

Solar farm
- Type: Flat-panel PV
- Collectors: 55,332
- Solar tracker: Single-axis

Wind farm
- Type: Onshore
- Site usage: Farm Land
- Rotor diameter: 136 m (446 ft)

Power generation
- Units planned: 12 × 3.45 MW
- Nameplate capacity: 50 MW

External links
- Website: kennedyenergypark.com.au

Kennedy Energy Park is a wind, solar and storage hybrid power station approximately 20 km south east of Hughenden and 290 km southwest of Townsville in Queensland.

Stage one of the project is a “proof-of-concept” commenced construction 2018, consisting of 30 MW of wind turbines, 20 MW of single axis tracking Solar Panels, and 2 MW of Li ion battery storage, costing $120 million to build was commissioned in 2023. It was constructed in 2018 but did not start to connect to the grid until July 2021. It is intended that the combination of solar and wind generation will be complementary and lead to stable output.

Stage two is proposed to be capable of producing 1200 MW of renewable energy, costing $2 billion and was hoped to commence construction before the end of 2020.

== See also ==
- Wind power in Australia
- Renewable energy in Australia
- List of wind farms in Queensland
