= Yandin Wind Farm =

Wind farm in Western Australia

- Country: Australia
- Location: Dandaragan
- Coordinates: 30°46′04″S 115°38′34″E
- Status: Operational
- Construction began: July 2019
- Commission date: May 2021
- Construction cost: AU$450 million
- Owners: RATCH-Australia (70%); Alinta Energy (30%)
- Operator: Vestas

Wind farm
- Type: Onshore
- Rotor diameter: 150 metres

Power generation
- Nameplate capacity: 214.2 MW

External links
- Website: www.yandinwindfarm.com.au

Yandin Wind Farm is one of Western Australia's largest (Note: Collgar Wind Farm is the largest, with a maximum capacity of 218 MW, compared to Yandin's 211 MW.) wind power stations, located in Dandaragan, Western Australia.

Construction was completed in late October 2020. It comprises 51 turbines with hub heights of 105 metres (344 ft) to maximise performance in the site's specific wind conditions. The turbines are Vestas V150 variants with a 4.2 MW capacity, resulting in a total generation capacity of 214 MW.

Commissioning began in July 2020 with increasing outputs being exported onto the South West Interconnected System as capacity (turbines) came online. The wind farm opened in May 2021.

Alinta Energy stated "the wind farm would power the equivalent of approximately 200,000 households across Western Australia each year."
