= List of power stations in Australia =

Location of power stations in Australia: coal, gas, hydroelectric / pumped storage

The following pages lists the power stations in Australia by region and status:

- List of power stations in New South Wales
- List of power stations in the Northern Territory
- List of power stations in Queensland
- List of power stations in South Australia
- List of power stations in Tasmania
- List of power stations in Victoria
- List of power stations in Western Australia
- List of proposed power stations in Australia
- List of coal fired power stations in Australia
- List of natural gas fired power stations in Australia
- List of wind farms in Australia

Loy Yang in Victoria is the largest power station in Australia by capacity (consisting of Loy Yang A and Loy Yang B counted together). However, if Loy Yang A and B are counted as separate power stations, Eraring Power Station in New South Wales is Australia's largest.

== See also ==
- Coal mining in Australia
- Energy policy of Australia
- National Electricity Market
- List of largest power stations in the world
- Solar power in Australia
- Wind power in Australia
- List of proposed power stations in Australia
