= Newman Power Station =

Power station in Newman, Western Australia

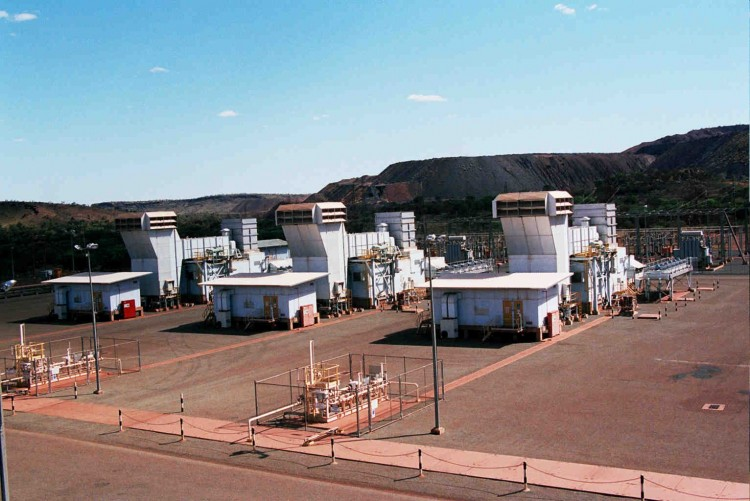
- Country: Australia
- Location: Newman
- Coordinates: 23°20′38″S 119°42′32″E
- Status: Operational
- Commission date: 1996
- Owner: Alinta Energy
- Operator: Alinta Energy

Thermal power station
- Primary fuel: Natural gas
- Secondary fuel: Diesel fuel

Power generation
- Nameplate capacity: 178 MW
- Storage capacity: 11 MW h

External links
- Website: www.apa.com.au/our-services/other-energy-services/gas-fired-power-generation1/newman-power-station-and-battery/

Newman Power Station is a power station in Newman, Western Australia, located about 1,186 kilometres (737 mi) north of Perth, and 9 kilometres (5.6 mi) north of the Tropic of Capricorn. It is a 178-megawatt (239,000 hp) natural-gas-fired power station servicing BHP's isolated grid. Newman currently provides 100% of the power requirement of the islanded grid which supplies electricity to the Area C mine operated by BHP.

The station was commissioned in 1996 and is owned and operated by APA Group. It receives its fuel from the Goldfields Gas Pipeline. In the event of interruptions to the gas supply, the power station can operate on diesel, and has approximately one million litres (260,000 US gal) of it stored on site.

The power station has a dedicated 121-kilometre (75 mi) transmission line to deliver electricity to the Roy Hill mine since 2015. It has four gas turbines. In 2017, a 35-megawatt (47,000 hp) 40-gigajoule (11 MWh) battery was installed to provide increased reliability and reserve.
