= Pinjar Power Station =

Power station in Perth, Western Australia

- Country: Australia
- Location: Pinjar
- Coordinates: 31°33′29″S 115°49′05″E
- Status: Operational
- Commission date: 1989
- Operator: Synergy

Thermal power station
- Primary fuel: Natural gas
- Secondary fuel: Diesel fuel
- Turbine technology: Gas turbine

Power generation
- Nameplate capacity: 576 MW

Pinjar Power Station is a power station in Pinjar, on the northern outskirts of Perth, Western Australia and near the locality of Neerabup and the recently commissioned Neerabup Power Station. It is natural gas-powered with nine gas turbines that together generate a total capacity of 576 MW of electricity. Although the power station primarily burns natural gas, it can also burn diesel fuel.

The station was commissioned in 1989. It is used as a peaking power plant.
