= Townsville Power Station =

- Country: Australia
- Location: Yabulu, Queensland
- Coordinates: 19.2°S 146.619°E
- Status: Opened
- Commission date: 1999
- Owner: RATCH-Australia

Thermal power station
- Primary fuel: Coal seam gas
- Combined cycle?: Yes

Power generation
- Units operational: 1
- Nameplate capacity: 242 MW

External links
- Website: Official website

Townsville Power Station is located in Yabulu, an industrial suburb of Townsville. The station is owned by RATCH-Australia. The station has a 160 MW Siemens turbine and an 82 MW heat recovery steam generator.

The station was built in the late 1990s as an open-cycle plant and was upgraded to combined-cycle operation in 2005.

== See also ==
- List of power stations in Queensland
