= Baroota Dam =

Former dam and reservoir in South Australia

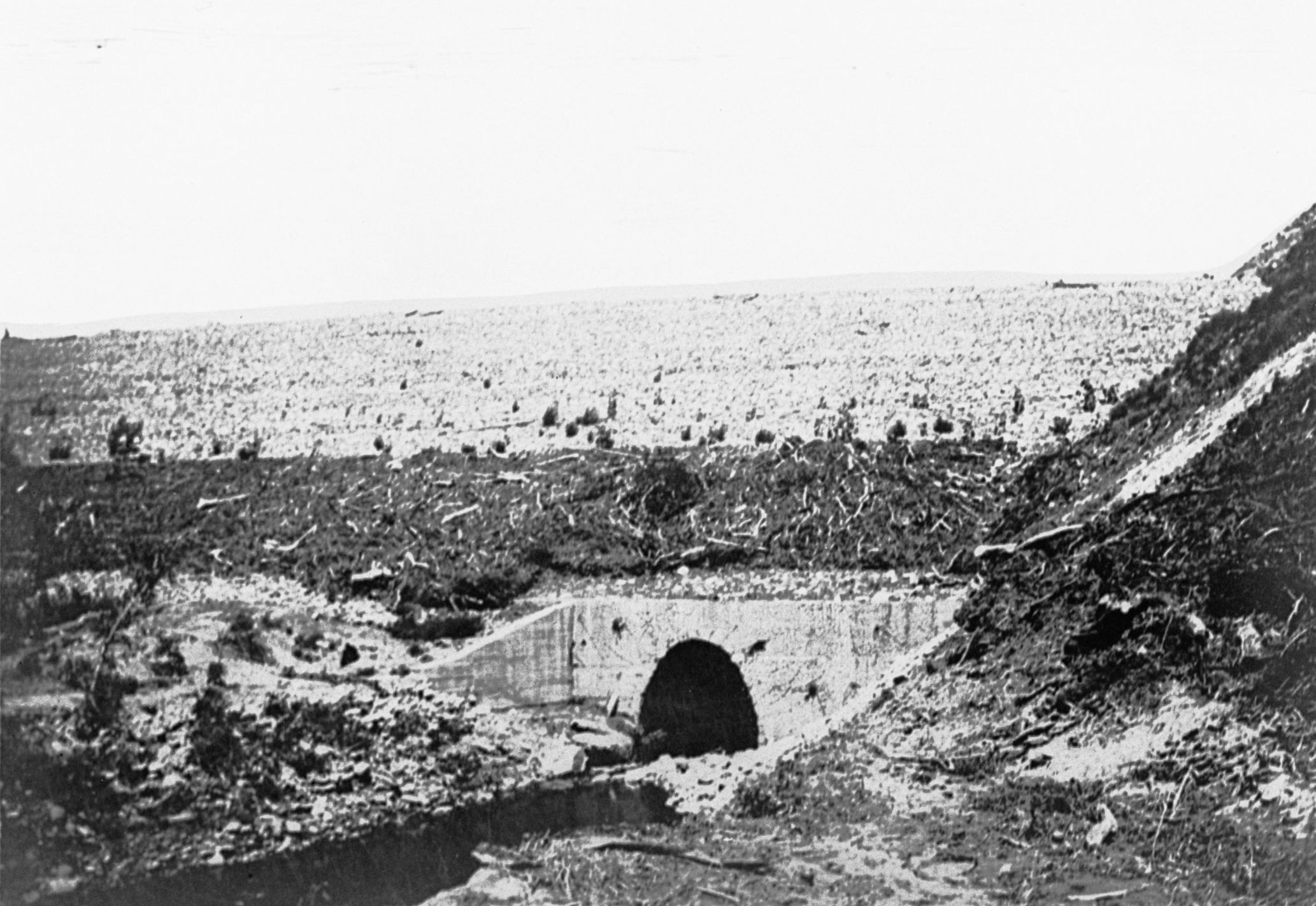
- The dam wall in c. 1915

- Location of the dam in South Australia
- Interactive map of Baroota Dam
- Country: Australia
- Location: Baroota, South Australia
- Coordinates: 32°55′18″S 138°03′46″E
- Purpose: Water supply
- Status: Decommissioned
- Opening date: 1921
- Built by: Atkins & Finlayson
- Designed by: Government of South Australia, Hydraulic Engineer's Department
- Operator: SA Water

Dam and spillways
- Type of dam: Earth fill dam
- Impounds: Baroota Creek
- Height (foundation): 37 m (121 ft)
- Height (thalweg): 30 m (98 ft)
- Length: 301 m (988 ft)
- Dam volume: 409×10^{3} m^{3} (14.4×10^{6} cu ft)
- Spillway type: Uncontrolled
- Spillway capacity: 585 m^{3}/s (20,700 cu ft/s)

Reservoir
- Creates: Baroota Reservoir
- Total capacity: 6.14 GL (4,980 acre⋅ft)
- Catchment area: 138 km^{2} (53 sq mi)
- Surface area: 63 ha (160 acres)
- Normal elevation: 111 m (364 ft) AHD

The Baroota Dam is a decommissioned earth-filled embankment dam across the Baroota Creek, located near Baroota, on the western edge of the southern Flinders Ranges of South Australia. It was built in 1921 to supply additional water to Port Pirie as part of the Beetaloo Reservoir distribution network. The resultant reservoir, Baroota Reservoir, is no longer used to supply drinking water, but is maintained as an emergency water source in the event that the Morgan-Whyalla pipeline fails. It is also used for a small amount of irrigation.

== Overview ==
The earth-filled dam wall is 37 metres (121 ft) high and 301 metres (988 ft) long. The resultant reservoir, Baroota Reservoir, has capacity of 6.14 gigalitres (4,980 acre⋅ft) when full and covers an area of 63 hectares (160 acres) drawn from a catchment area of 138 square kilometres (53 sq mi). The uncontrolled spillway has the capacity of handling flow of 585 cubic metres per second (20,700 cu ft/s).

The reservoir does not fill every year. When completed in 1921, it did not fill to the spillway until 1932. The original spillway was replaced in the mid-1950s and again in 1978.

== Proposed pumped hydro storage facility ==
In 2018, Rise Renewables was granted A$3 million to develop a A$406 million pumped hydro storage facility using Baroota Reservoir. At the time, the South Australian Government funded the development of several proposals, as South Australia had no pumped hydro storage facilities connected to the grid. If the project is completed, it is expected to provide between 200 and 270 megawatts (270,000 and 360,000 hp) with up to eight hours of storage. The proposal would use the Baroota Reservoir as the lower pond and establish a new upper reservoir for water to be pumped and stored. Rise Renewables also has a proposal for a solar farm, called the Bridle Track Solar Project, that could provide electricity to power the pump. In August 2019, the majority stake in the project, held by Rise Renewables, was acquired by UPC Renewables.

== See also ==
- List of reservoirs and dams in South Australia
- List of pumped-storage hydroelectric power stations
- Renewable energy in Australia
