= Darlington Point Solar Farm =

- Country: Australia
- Location: Darlington Point
- Coordinates: 34°38′42″S 146°02′24″E
- Status: Operational
- Construction began: 2019
- Commission date: 2020
- Construction cost: 450 million A$
- Operator: Canadian Solar

Solar farm
- Type: Standard PV

Power generation
- Nameplate capacity: 275 MW

External links
- Website: octopusinvestments.com.au/our-projects/darlington-point-solar-farm/

Darlington Point Solar Farm is a photovoltaic power station, located 10 km south of the town of Darlington Point in New South Wales, Australia, that was launched in 2020. It received planning approval and development consent on 7 December 2018, and has a power purchase agreement for supply of 150MW to Delta Energy. The total output is 333MW DC or 275MW AC. It was commissioned in 2020 and is the largest single solar power station in Australia. The project is owned by Octopus Investments. The contract for engineering, procurement and construction (EPC) is let to a consortium of Signal Energy and Canadian Solar. Canadian Solar also has the operations and maintenance services contract.
