= Jemalong Solar Farm =

- Country: Australia
- Location: Jemalong
- Coordinates: 33°24′29″S 147°38′49″E
- Owner: Genex Power
- Operator: Genex Power

Solar farm
- Type: Standard PV

Power generation
- Nameplate capacity: 50 MW
- Capacity factor: 29 %

External links
- Website: www.genexpower.com.au/50mw-jemalong-solar-project.html

Jemalong Solar Farm is a 50MW solar farm in the locality of Jemalong 30 kilometres (19 mi) west of Forbes in New South Wales, Australia. It is owned and operated by Genex Power.

Early development of the project was by Vast Solar Pty Ltd. Genex Power acquired the project in 2018. It was constructed by Beoen Energy Solutions, commencing in 2020 and completed in 2021.

The Jemalong Solar Farm connects to the grid at Essential Energy's West Jemalong substation.
