= Vestas V90-2MW =

The Vestas V90-2MW is a three-bladed upwind horizontal-axis wind turbine designed and manufactured by Vestas with versions for wind classes IIA and IIIA.

The V90-2MW has a tubular steel tower between 80 metres (260 ft) and 125 metres (410 ft) height. The nacelle is 10.4 metres (34 ft) long, 3.5 metres (11 ft) wide, and 5.4 metres (18 ft) high once installed. The rotor has a diameter of 90 metres (300 ft), with blades 44 metres (144 ft) long.

== See also ==
- Vestas V90-3MW
