= Bairnsdale Power Station =

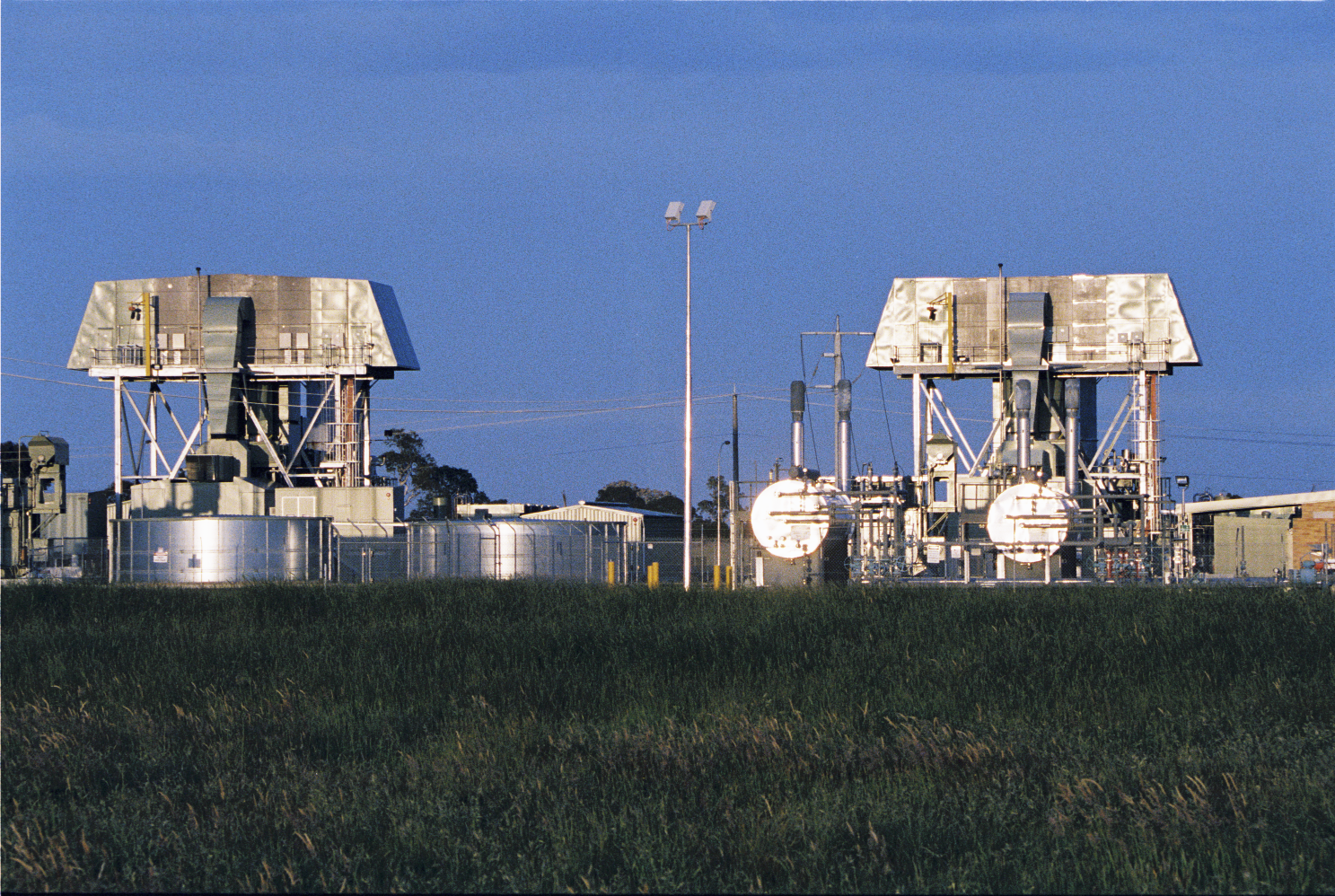
- Country: Australia
- Coordinates: 37°50′41″S 147°33′54″E
- Status: Operational
- Commission date: 2001
- Owner: Alinta Energy
- Operator: Alinta Energy

Thermal power station
- Primary fuel: Natural gas

Power generation
- Nameplate capacity: 94 MW

External links
- Website: www.alintaenergy.com.au/about-us/power-generation/bairnsdale

Bairnsdale Power Station is a 94 megawatts (126,000 hp) natural gas-fired power station in Victoria’s East Gippsland region, owned and operated by Alinta Energy. It is a fast start, peaking power station dispatching into the National Electricity Market. Bairnsdale Power Station is connected to the AusNet Services distribution network grid.

The station was commissioned in 2001. It has two GE LM6000PD gas turbines.

== See also ==
- Alinta Energy
