= Western Alliance =

Western Alliance may refer to:

- Western Alliance Bancorporation, an American bank holding company
- Western Alliance, a New Zealand rugby league competition created in 2003 – see Manawatu Rugby League
- Western Alliance Challenge Series, original name of the Western Soccer Alliance, a former soccer league in the United States and Canada
- Western Alliance, a bloc of nations in Maiden Rose, a Japanese manga series

== See also ==
- NATO, a military alliance with 30 member states
- Western Allies, a political and geographic grouping among the Allied Powers of World War II
- Western Bloc, a Cold War-era coalition of nations that included NATO
- Western Union (alliance), a predecessor of NATO
- Big Four (Western Europe)
