= Kwinana Power Station =

Former power station in Perth, Western Australia

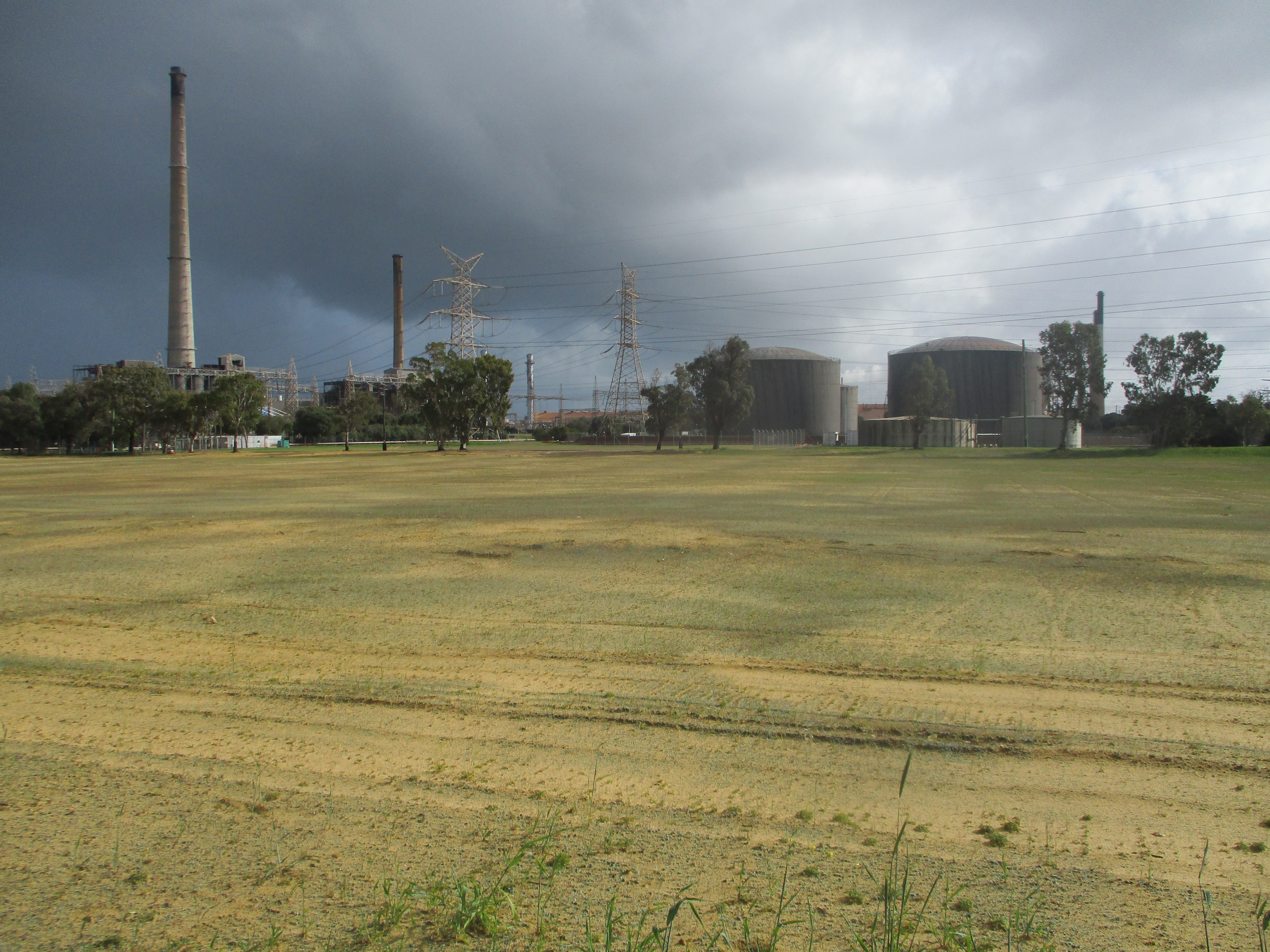
- Country: Australia
- Location: Naval Base, Western Australia
- Coordinates: 32°11′55″S 115°46′30″E
- Status: Operational
- Commission date: 1970
- Owner: Synergy

Thermal power station
- Primary fuel: Coal, Natural Gas
- Turbine technology: Steam cycle
- Cooling source: Sea water

Power generation
- Nameplate capacity: 900 MW

External links
- Commons: Related media on Commons

Kwinana Power Station (KPS) was Synergy's second-largest power station, located in Naval Base, Western Australia. At its peak, power was produced from six turbines driven by steam from boilers fired by coal, natural gas or fuel oil, and one gas turbine. The steam turbines closed in 2015; however, two gas turbines continue to operate on the site. This is not to be confused with Cockburn Power Station to its immediate south.

KPS was originally built in 1970 as an oil-fired power station, however it was later converted to coal due to the rising price of oil caused by the 1973 oil crisis. This project received an Engineering Excellence Award from the Institution of Engineers Australia in 1980.

A 20 MW gas turbine, able to be operated on natural gas or diesel fuel, was added in 1972 and took the total nameplate rating to 900 MW which was the station's peak. With greatly increased availability of natural gas from the North West Shelf Venture project, natural gas firing was introduced in the mid 1980s. In 2005 oil burning was re-introduced making the power station unique in Western Australia as it could burn the three fuels: coal, natural gas and oil. In 2025, the smokestacks were gradually dismantled.

The original station operated:

- Two 120 MW steam turbines (oil/gas/coal fired) as A units 1 & 2 from 1970/1 to September 2010
- Two 120 MW steam turbines (oil/gas/coal fired) as B units 3 & 4 from 1972/3 to December 2008
- Two 200 MW steam turbines (oil/gas/coal fired) as C units 5 & 6 from 1978/9 to October 2015
- One 20 MW gas turbine from 1972
