= Archer Point Wind Farm =

Wind farm in Queensland, Australia

- Country: Australia
- Location: Archer Point, Queensland
- Coordinates: 15°34′48″S 145°18′36″E
- Status: Proposed
- Owner: Yuku-Baja-Muliku Corporation

Wind farm
- Type: Onshore
- Site area: 2300 ha

Power generation
- Units operational: 60
- Nameplate capacity: 100–120 MW

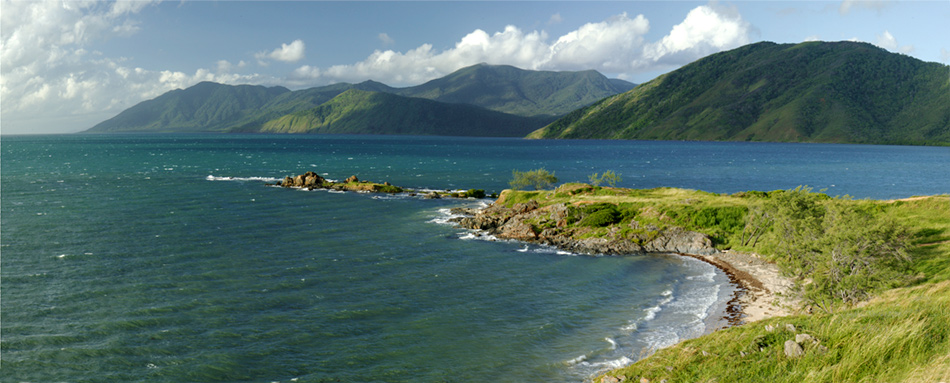
Archer Point, Queensland

The Archer Point Wind Farm, alternatively Jalunji Wind Park or Cooktown Wind Farm, is a proposed wind farm to be located at Archer Point, about 15 km south of Cooktown, Queensland. It is expected to cost A$250 million to construct.

The wind farm is envisioned to have 60 wind turbines in Stage 1. The total generation capacity for Stage 1 would be 138 MW. This would be enough electricity generation to power the entire Cape York Peninsula while supplementing the electricity needs of Port Douglas and Cairns. Archer Point is recognised as one of the windiest places in Queensland.

The project would generate about 884 GWh of electricity annually – enough electricity to power over 80,000 average Queensland homes. In addition, the wind farm would make a very significant contribution to reducing greenhouse gas emissions in Queensland – reducing electricity emissions by over 370,000 tonnes of greenhouse gas emissions annually. This would be equivalent to taking 85,000 cars off the road. Once constructed, the wind farm would have twice the capacity of the largest renewable energy generation facility in Queensland. Towers are expected to be 80 m high.

In May 2011, it was announced that a lease agreement between the traditional land owners and National Power has been reached.

Installation of the project was touted to take place in late 2025.

== See also ==
- Wind power in Australia
