= Western Power (networks corporation) =

Energy company in Western Australia

- Native name: Electricity Networks Corporation
- Type: State government owned
- Traded as: Western Power
- Industry: Utility
- Predecessor: Western Power
- Founded: 1 April 2006; 20 years ago
- Headquarters: Perth, Western Australia
- Area served: South West of Western Australia
- Key people: Gair Landsborough (CEO)
- Services: Electricity distribution
- Owner: Government of Western Australia
- Website: westernpower.com.au

Western Power is a statutory corporation established by the Electricity Corporations Act 2005 (WA). It is owned by the state government of Western Australia and is accountable to the Minister for Energy. It is responsible for building, maintaining and operating the electricity network within the South-West Interconnected System (SWIS), the poles and wires or energy grid.

In 2006, what was then the original Western Power Corporation was split it was separated into four independent companies:

- Western Power - manages the physical network that transports electricity in the south-west of WA, including the Perth metropolitan area. Western Power does not generate electricity or send electricity bills to customers. Its role is to manage the poles, wires, substations and other infrastructure that brings electricity to homes and businesses in the SWIS.
- Horizon Power - manages the physical network that transports electricity in the north and regional areas of WA. Horizon power is also responsible for electricity generation and billing.
- Synergy - the energy retailer that manages electricity accounts and is responsible for billing customers.
- Verve Energy - was the generation business that produces electricity. Merged with Synergy in 2014.

== Operations ==
The SWIS reaches from Albany in the south, Kalbarri in the north and Kalgoorlie in the east of the state and includes the Perth metropolitan area. The Western Power network consists of more than 103,000 km (64,001 mi) of powerlines, 825,788 poles & towers, 276,000 streetlights and 154 transmission substations.

== See also ==
- Alinta
- State Energy Commission of Western Australia
