= RATCH-Australia =

RATCH-Australia Corporation
- Industry: Electricity generation
- Predecessor: Transfield Services Infrastructure Fund
- Founded: July 2011
- Headquarters: North Sydney
- Area served: Australia
- Parent: RATCH Group
- Website: ratchaustralia.com

RATCH-Australia Corporation (RAC) is an Australian electricity generation company. It is a subsidiary of RATCH Group (formerly known as Ratchaburi Electricity Generating Holding Company), a public company listed on the Stock Exchange of Thailand. RATCH-Australia owns both renewable energy and fossil fuel power stations in Australia.

== History ==
In 2007, Transfield Services spun-off its infrastructure assets into the Transfield Services Infrastructure Fund. In November 2007, it acquired five further power generation assets from Stanwell Corporation and Tarong Energy.

RATCH-Australia was established in July 2011 when its parent company bought an 80% stake in Transfield Services Infrastructure Fund via a scheme of arrangement.

Power stations owned by RATCH-Australia are:

| Power station | Capacity (MW) | Source | State | Remarks |
|---|---|---|---|---|
| Collector Wind Farm | 228 | Wind | New South Wales | To open 2021 |
| Collinsville Power Station | 42 | Solar | Queensland | Previously 190 MW coal power station decommissioned in 2018. |
| Kemerton Power Station | 261 | Natural gas | Western Australia | |
| Kwinana Cogeneration Plant | 120 | Natural gas | Western Australia | Also provides steam to the adjacent Kwinana Oil Refinery |
| Mount Emerald Wind Farm | 180 | Wind | Queensland | |
| Starfish Hill Wind Farm | 34.5 | Wind | South Australia | |
| Toora Wind Farm | 21 | Wind | Victoria | |
| Townsville Power Station | 242 | Coal seam gas | Queensland | Combined cycle gas and steam turbines |
| Windy Hill Wind Farm | 12 | Wind | Queensland | |
| Yandin Wind Farm | 338 | Wind | Western Australia | |
