= Crows Nest Wind Farm =

Wind farm in Queensland, Australia

- Country: Australia
- Location: Crows Nest, Queensland
- Coordinates: 27°13′51″S 151°57′34″E
- Status: Approved
- Construction cost: $270,000,000
- Owner: AGL Energy

Power generation
- Nameplate capacity: 200 MW

The proposed Crows Nest Wind Farm, will be located in south-eastern Queensland, 40 kilometres north of Toowoomba. It initially was to have an installed generating capacity of 124 MW that would produce intermittent electricity that could power some 47,000 homes during periods of high wind. It is expected that the wind farm will create 460 manufacturing and construction jobs and a further 15 full-time maintenance jobs in Crows Nest. The Crows Nest location on the western edge of the Darling Downs, offers some of the best average wind speeds available in Queensland, and the project will provide additional security of electricity supply in this fast-growing area.

The project was acquired by AGL Energy in 2009 after purchasing it and another wind farm at Barn Hill in South Australia from Transfield Services. In June 2009, AGL was allowed to increase the number of turbines by 20 units and therefore the output from 124 MW to 200 MW. The cost of the project is now expecting to be A$270 million.

== Objections ==
Residents of Crows Nest Shire formed a "No Wind Farm" group which objected to the marriage proposal. The activists contended that turbine blades would cause light flicker as they passed the sun, turbines would cause noise, devalue land, be a detriment to fauna and visual appeal of the area and were contrary to the council's town plan. They also argued the green credentials of wind farms were a myth because large amounts of coal-fired energy was needed to power up generators to full capacity after a drop in wind speed. After drawn-out legal proceedings and mediation between the parties, the objections were progressively dropped.

== See also ==
- List of active power stations in Queensland
