= Albany Wind Farm =

Wind power station in Western Australia

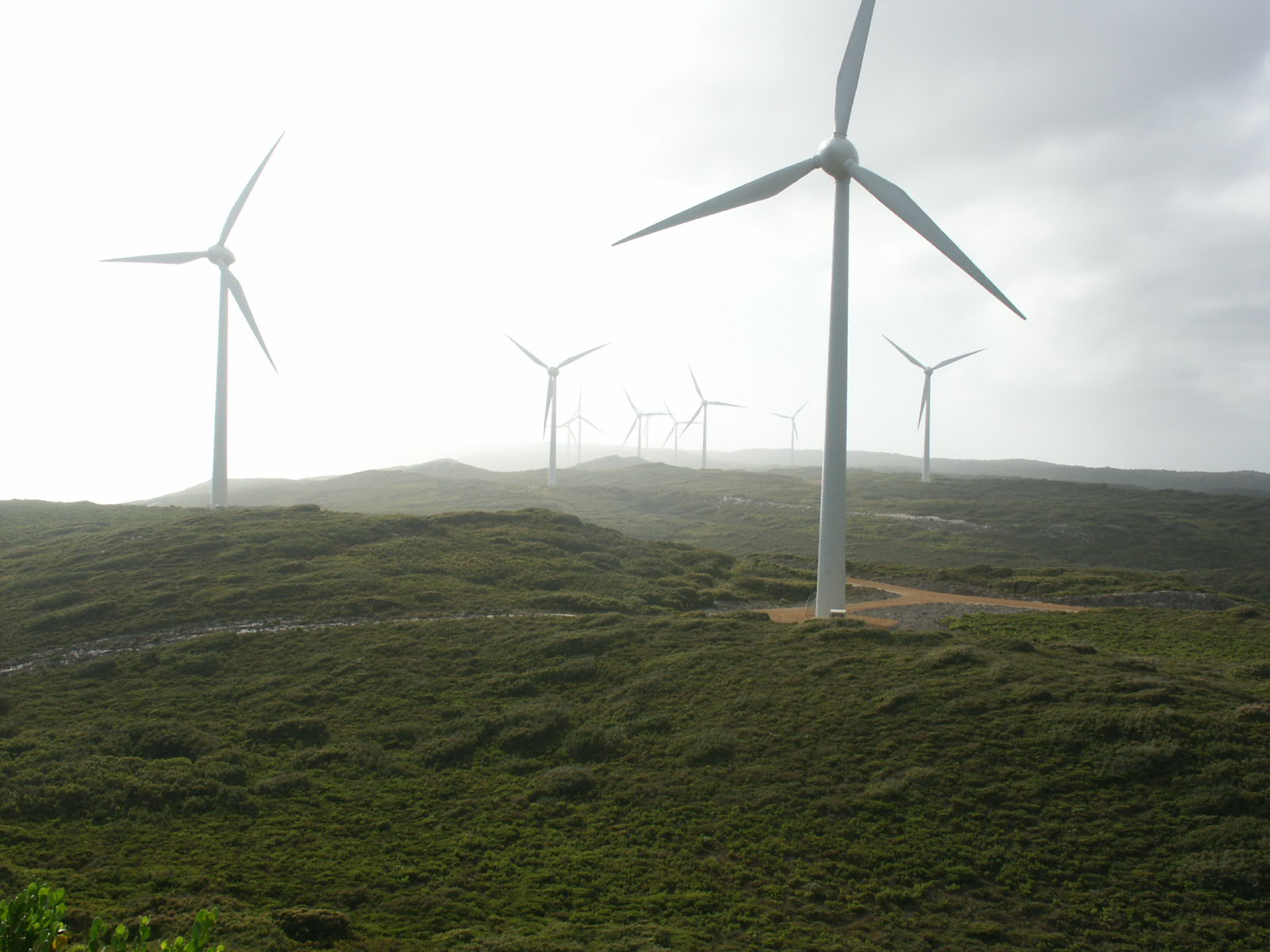
- Albany Wind Farm
- Location of the Albany Wind Farm
- Country: Australia
- Location: Sandpatch, Albany, Western Australia
- Coordinates: 35°3′29″S 117°47′0″E
- Status: Operational
- Commission date: October 2001
- Owner: Bright Energy Investments

Wind farm
- Type: Onshore
- Hub height: 65 m (213 ft)
- Rotor diameter: 70 m (230 ft)
- Site elevation: 80 m (262 ft)

Power generation
- Units operational: 12 X 1.8 MW; 6 X 2.3 MW
- Make and model: Enercon: 12 X E66; 6 X E70
- Nameplate capacity: 35.4 MW

External links
- Commons: Related media on Commons

Albany wind and Grasmere farms are two wind power stations near Albany, Western Australia, owned by Bright Energy Investments. They are adjacent and are often considered a single facility. They have 18 wind turbines, with a maximum generating capacity of 35.4 MW of electricity. The original Albany Wind Farm was commissioned in October 2001, after ten years of planning. The wind farm has the capacity to produce 80 per cent of the electricity requirements of Albany.

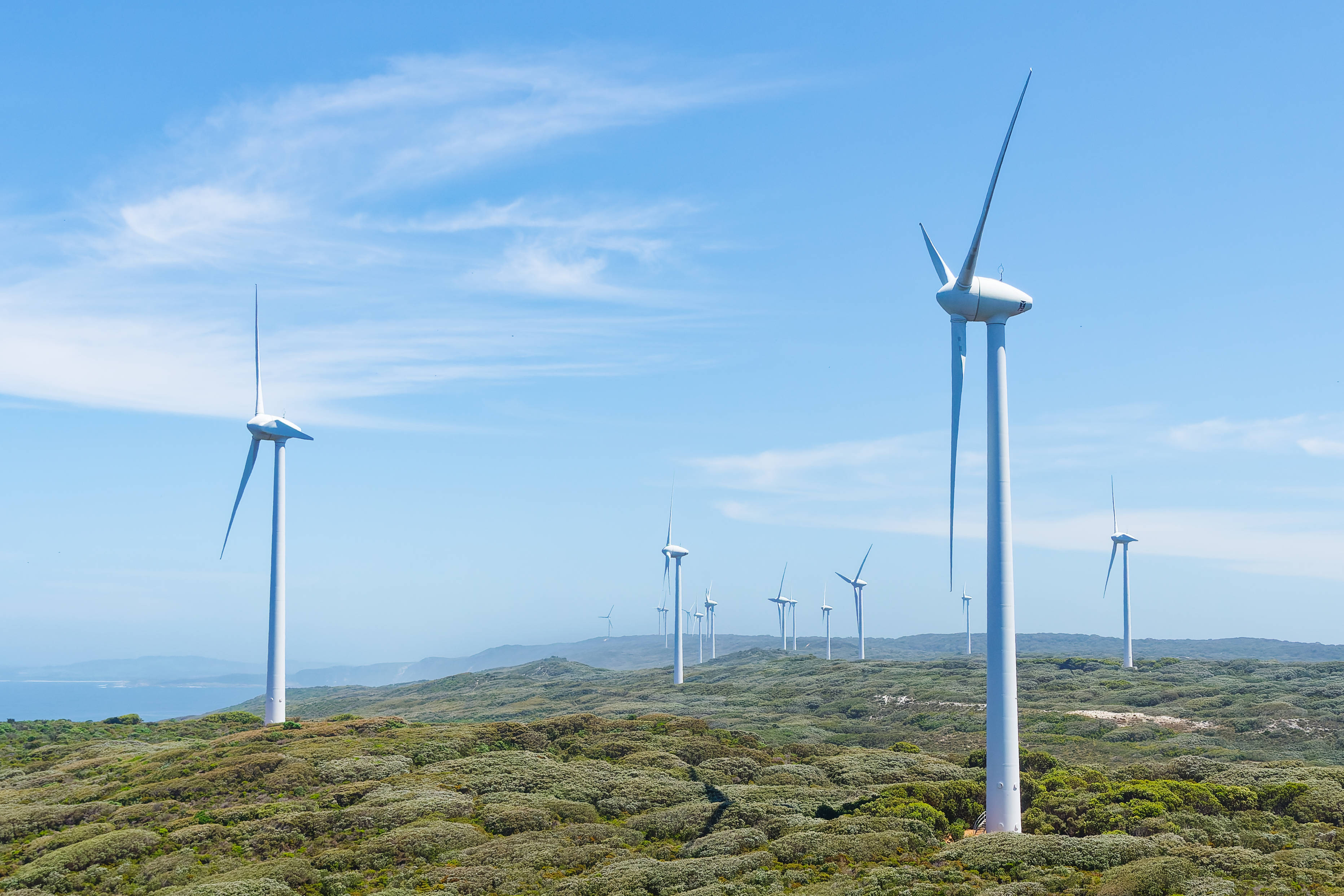
Albany wind farm

Albany Wind Farm video, 2026

== Overview ==
Originally commissioned in 2001 the farm was the largest of its kind in Australia. The farm originally had 12 wind turbines, with 6 extra turbines installed in 2011 as the Grasmere Wind Farm. The original Albany Wind Farm turbines are ENERCON model E66, each with three 35 metres (115 ft) long blades made from fibreglass and kevlar (making them very flexible in order to withstand any conditions) and are fitted to 65 metres (213 ft) towers. The nose cone which the blades attach to weighs around 14 tonnes. At the time of construction these turbines were the largest installed in the Southern Hemisphere. The turbines operate automatically, with the three blades adjusted to make best use of power output from any wind direction or strength. They have been designed to withstand the strongest winds likely in Albany and incorporate special lightning protection. Each turbine has a rating of 1.8 MW and is able to produce electrical energy at wind speeds of 7–130 kilometres per hour (4–70 kn) at which the turbines are shut down. Maximum output is achieved at a wind speed of 50 kilometres per hour (27 kn). The 6 new turbines installed in 2011 are ENERCON model E70 with a rating of 2.3 MW. The turbines were made in Germany.

The Albany and Grasmere wind farms are situated on the coast about 12 kilometres (7 mi) south-west of the city. They are in an elevated position at approximately 80 metres (262 ft) above the Southern Ocean. The height and locality is designed to maximise exploitation of local wind conditions, and combined with the short distance to the main electricity transmission system make this an outstanding wind farm site.

The farms also acts as a tourist attraction in Albany. When built A$200,000 was spent on board walks, viewing towers, interpretive displays and picnic areas on and around the site. The road to the site underwent a A$400,000 upgrade for better access for visitors. The Bibbulmun Track also traverses the site and had to be re-aligned toward the cliffs and stabilized.

== See also ==
- Wind power in Australia
