= Mungarra Power Station =

Power station in Western Australia

- Country: Australia
- Coordinates: 28°53′21″S 115°07′05″E
- Status: Operational
- Commission date: 1990

Thermal power station
- Primary fuel: Natural gas
- Turbine technology: Gas turbine

Power generation
- Nameplate capacity: 112 MW

Mungarra Power Station is a power station 50 km south-east of Geraldton, Western Australia. It is natural gas powered with three gas turbines that together generate a total capacity of 112 MW of electricity.

The station was commissioned in 1990.
