= Neerabup Power Station =

Power station in Perth, Western Australia

- Country: Australia
- Location: Neerabup, Western Australia
- Coordinates: 31.6705°S 115.8025°E
- Owner: Shell Energy

Thermal power station
- Primary fuel: Natural gas
- Combined cycle?: No

Power generation
- Nameplate capacity: 330 MW

External links
- Website: Official website

Neerabup Power Station is a power station in eastern Neerabup, just north of Perth, Western Australia. Its two open cycle gas turbines have a cumulative electrical generation capacity of 330 MW. Natural gas is provided by a 30 km high-pressure gas linepack pipeline connected to the Dampier to Bunbury Natural Gas Pipeline.

The station was commissioned in October 2009.
