= Western Power Corporation =

Former electric utility in Western Australia

Western Power
- Type: Government-owned corporation
- Industry: Energy
- Founded: 1995
- Defunct: 2006
- Fate: Demerged
- Headquarters: Perth, Western Australia
- Area served: Western Australia
- Products: Electricity

Western Power Corporation (WPC), owned by the Government of Western Australia, was Western Australia's major electricity supplier from 1995 until 2006.

It was formed in 1995 when the monopoly electricity and gas supplier, the State Energy Commission of Western Australia, was disaggregated into separate suppliers for gas (AlintaGas) and electricity (WPC).

In 2006, WPC was disaggregated into Western Power, Synergy, Horizon Power and Verve Energy.
