= Alinta Energy =

Australian energy company

Alinta Energy Pty Ltd
- Type: Subsidiary
- Industry: Energy
- Predecessor: Alinta
- Founded: 29 March 2011, but parts of the business date from 1950s
- Headquarters: Sydney, Australia
- Key people: Jeff Dimery (CEO)
- Products: Natural gas and electricity
- Owner: Sembcorp
- Number of employees: ≈800
- Website: www.alintaenergy.com.au

Alinta Energy is an Australian electricity generating and gas retailing private company owned by Singaporean-based Sembcorp Industries. Alinta Energy has an owned and contracted generation portfolio of up to 1,957 MW, approximately 1.1 million combined electricity and gas retail customers and around 800 employees across Australia and New Zealand.

== History ==
In March 2011, due to a deleveraging transaction by the TPG Group, Alinta became Alinta Energy. Alinta Energy was acquired by Hong Kong–based Chow Tai Fook Enterprises in 2017. Chow Tai Fook Enterprises also acquired Loy Yang B power station with assists from Alinta Energy staff.

In May 2018, Alinta Energy was announced as the principal partner of the Australian Men's cricket team on a four-year deal, the longest in Australian Cricket history. The Alinta Energy logo will feature on the players' kits for all international matches played in Australia.

In August 2023, Alinta Energy agreed to sell its power assets in the Pilbara, Western Australia, to gas pipeline operator APA Group for A$1.72 billion ($1.1 billion) including debt, a deal that was completed in October 2023.

In December 2025, it was announced the Singaporean state-owned energy and urban development company, Sembcorp Industries had agreed to acquire Alinta Energy from Chow Tai Fook Enterprises for an enterprise value of A$6.5 billion. The transaction includes Alinta's 3.4 GW portfolio of generation assets and its customer base of approximately 1.1 million electricity and gas consumers across Australia.

As of 2 February 2026, Sembcorp Industries' shareholders approved the acquisition. With this, Sembcorp now owns the 1200-megawatt Loy Yang B coal power station, situated in Victoria's Latrobe Valley, that supplies 20% of the electricity used by the state.

== Electricity generation ==
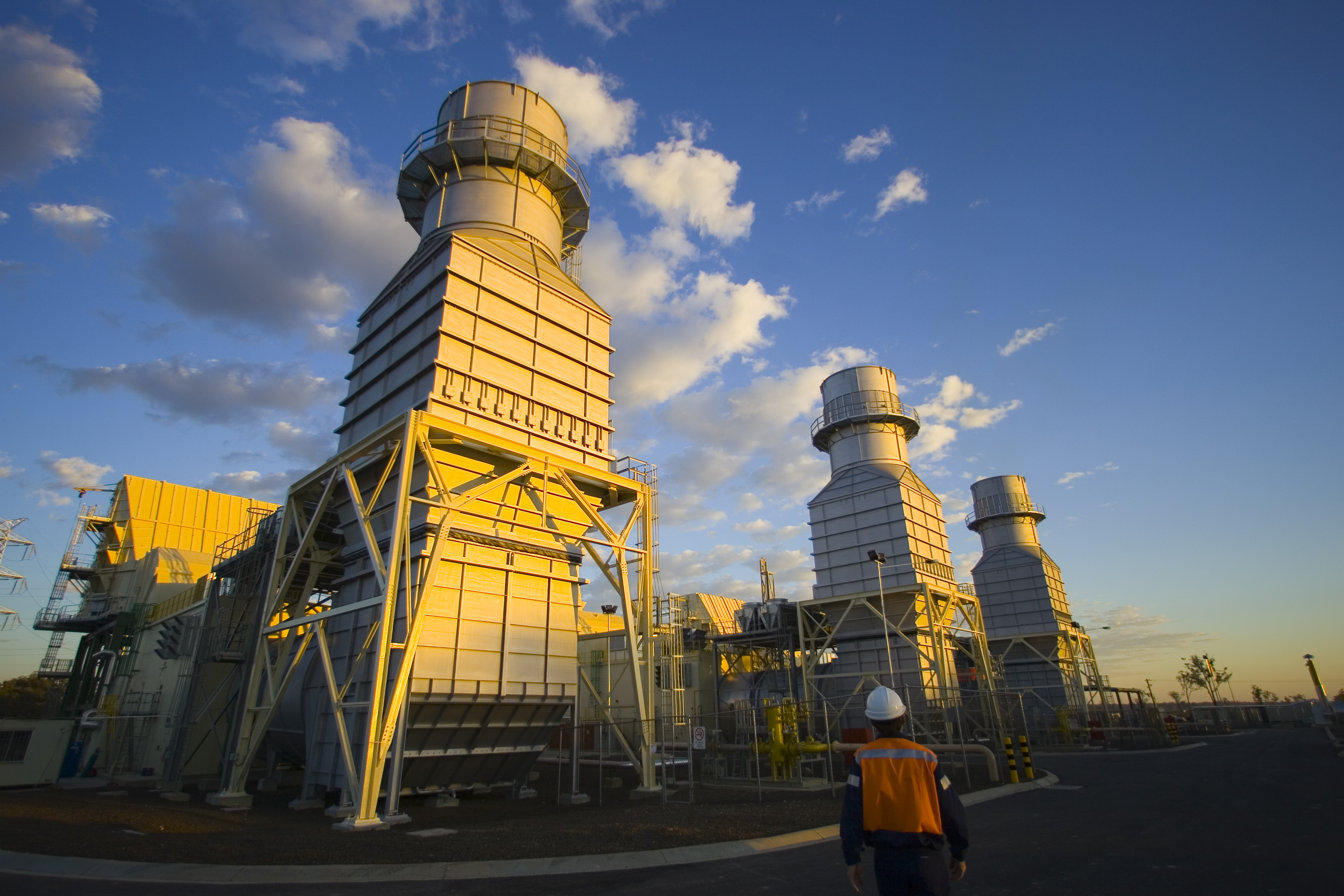
Braemar Power Station

Alinta Energy's approximately 3,000 MW electricity generation portfolio includes:

1. Pinjarra Power Station, Western Australia
2. Wagerup Power Station, Western Australia
3. Yandin Wind Farm, Western Australia
4. Braemar Power Station, Queensland
5. Bairnsdale Power Station, Victoria
6. Loy Yang B Power Station, Victoria
7. Glenbrook Power Station, New Zealand

== Downstream electricity and natural gas retail ==
- Electricity: 2012 saw Alinta Energy enter the South Australia and Victoria markets for electricity customers.
- Natural Gas: 700,000 gas customers (Western Australia)

== Other assets ==
Flinders Power, a division of Alinta Energy, in May 2016 permanently closed Playford A Power Station, Playford B Power Station and Northern Power Station and is in the process of demolishing and remediating the sites. The mining operations at Telford Cut Leigh Creek, which supplied coal to these power stations, ceased in 2015.

Alinta Energy is in the process of seeking approval to build the Reeves Plains Power Station, a new gas-turbine power station in South Australia.
