= South West Interconnected System =

Electricity grid in South West Australia

The South West Interconnected System (SWIS) is an electricity grid in the southwestern part of Western Australia. It extends to the coast in the south and west, to Kalbarri in the north and Kalgoorlie in the east. It is not connected to the other large Australian grids. Other parts of the state are connected to independent, smaller grids, including the larger-scale North West Interconnected System and many smaller microgrids managed by Horizon Power.

The SWIS consists of both the South West Interconnected Network ("poles and wires") and its electricity generators. The South West Interconnected Network is operated by Western Power, owned by the Western Australian government, and includes over 7800 km of transmission lines, and over 93,000 km of distribution lines.

Some of the generators are owned by the government through Synergy and others are privately owned. Wholesale trade in electricity across the SWIS is managed by the Australian Energy Market Operator through the Wholesale Electricity Market (WA) which began operation on 21 September 2006. The majority of large-scale generation on the SWIS is coal-fired or gas-fired, with a small but increasing proportion coming from wind and solar. The Western Australian government has announced that the Synergy-owned coal-fired generation will shut down by 2030.

A 100MW/200MWh battery storage power station is (of July 2022) under construction for connection to the SWIS, and is expected to be completed by "the end of 2022".

Synergy is the monopoly electricity retailer for household and small business customers on the SWIS. Large-scale electricity users have a choice of 11 retailers.

36% of customers connected to the SWIS have grid-connected rooftop solar systems, with a total installed capacity of 1362 MW. The large amount of solar systems in the grid has meant that from February 2022, newly installed solar systems are required to have the capability to curtail output on rare occasions to maintain grid stability.

== See also ==
- List of power stations in Western Australia
- Energy in Western Australia
- Horizon Power
- National electricity market
- Synergy (electricity corporation)
- Western Power (networks corporation)
