= Horizon Power =

Government power company in Western Australia

- Type: Government-owned corporation
- Industry: Electricity
- Predecessor: Western Power Corporation
- Founded: 1 April 2006
- Founder: Government of Western Australia
- Headquarters: Bentley, Western Australia
- Area served: Western Australia
- Key people: Samantha Tough (Chairperson); Krystal Skinner (Acting CEO)
- Services: Electricity distribution
- Revenue: $676 million (2024)
- Net income: $15 million (2024)
- Number of employees: 611 (2024)
- Parent: Government of Western Australia
- Website: www.horizonpower.com.au

Horizon Power is a power company that provides power supplies to Western Australia owned by the Government of Western Australia.

Horizon Power was established on 1 April 2006 after Western Power Corporation was split up. It operates in the Pilbara, Kimberley, Gascoyne/Mid-West and Southern Goldfields-Esperance regions of Western Australia. Horizon Power's head office is in Karratha with regional offices in Broome, Kununurra, Carnarvon, Esperance and Port Hedland, and administrative support delivered from Perth.

Horizon Power is responsible for delivering electricity to 47,000 connections, supplying more than 100,000 residents and more than 10,000 businesses in regional towns and remote communities. It manages 38 systems: the North West Interconnected System in the Pilbara and the connected network between Kununurra, Wyndham and Lake Argyle, and 34 stand-alone systems across regional Western Australia.

Its service area is approximately 2.3 million square kilometres, which means Horizon Power services the biggest area with the fewest customers in the world. For every 53.5 square kilometres of terrain, Horizon Power has one customer.
