= Synergy (electricity corporation) =

Electricity corporation in Western Australia

- Type: State government owned
- Industry: Utility
- Predecessor: Western Power
- Founded: 1 April 2006; 20 years ago
- Headquarters: Perth, Western Australia
- Area served: Perth and the south west region
- Key people: David Fyfe (chief executive officer); Lyndon Rowe (chairman)
- Services: Electricity retail and generation
- Owner: Government of Western Australia
- Number of employees: Under 1,000
- Website: www.synergy.net.au

Synergy is a corporation owned by the Government of Western Australia. Synergy is Western Australia (WA)’s largest energy retailer and generator with more than one million industrial, commercial and residential customers, generating total annual revenue of more than $3.2 billion (2014/15 financial year).

== History ==
Synergy, Verve Energy, Horizon Power and Western Power were created in 2006 as a result of the breakup (disaggregation) of Western Power Corporation. With effect from 1 January 2014 the retailer (Synergy) merged with the state-owned generation business (Verve Energy). That new company is also called Synergy.

== Area served (retail electricity) ==
Synergy sells electricity to customers connected to the South West Interconnected System (SWIS) covering the area from Kalbarri in the north to Albany in the south and east to Kalgoorlie.

== Legal basis ==
The corporation was created by enactment of the Electricity Corporations Act 2005. Its official legal name is the "Electricity Generation and Retail Corporation". It is a body corporate with perpetual succession. It can use and operate under trading names approved by the Minister (for example, Synergy). Although it is a state owned corporation, it is not part of the WA public service under the Public Sector Management Act 1994. Further, it does not have the status, immunities and privileges of the State of WA.

== Business overview ==
The primary activities of Synergy are electricity generation and retail sales, and wholesale energy trading. It sells electricity to residential and business customers, and gas to large-scale business customers.

=== Electricity generation ===
Synergy is involved in electricity generation from a variety of sources. Generation assets include coal-fired generation at Muja and Collie power stations, gas turbines at Cockburn, Pinjar, Kalgoorlie and Mungarra and wind and solar farms in WA's mid-west and great southern regions.

=== Electricity wholesale business ===
Synergy is involved in wholesale trading of electricity in WA. It manages the dispatch of Synergy's generation fleet and independent power producer contracts, as well as fuel contracts. Wholesale buys electricity and related products, and sells to retail and wholesale market participants under ring fenced arrangements that aim to comply with Australian competition law.

=== Electricity retail sales ===
Synergy is involved in the pricing, sale and marketing of electricity to end-user customers in the SWIS. It also sells accredited renewable energy electricity.

=== Gas trading ===
Synergy is involved in the wholesale trading of natural gas in WA.

=== Gas retail sales ===
Synergy is involved in the pricing, sale and marketing of gas to end-user customers in WA.

== Monopoly and other retailers ==
Synergy has a legislated monopoly on the sale of electricity to residential and other customers who do not consume a large amount of electricity. Horizon Power supplies energy to WA customers outside the SWIS.

== See also ==
- Alinta
- Alinta Energy
- Economic Regulation Authority (WA)
- List of power stations in Western Australia
- State Energy Commission of Western Australia
- South West Interconnected System
- Western Power (networks corporation)
