= List of power stations in Victoria (state) =

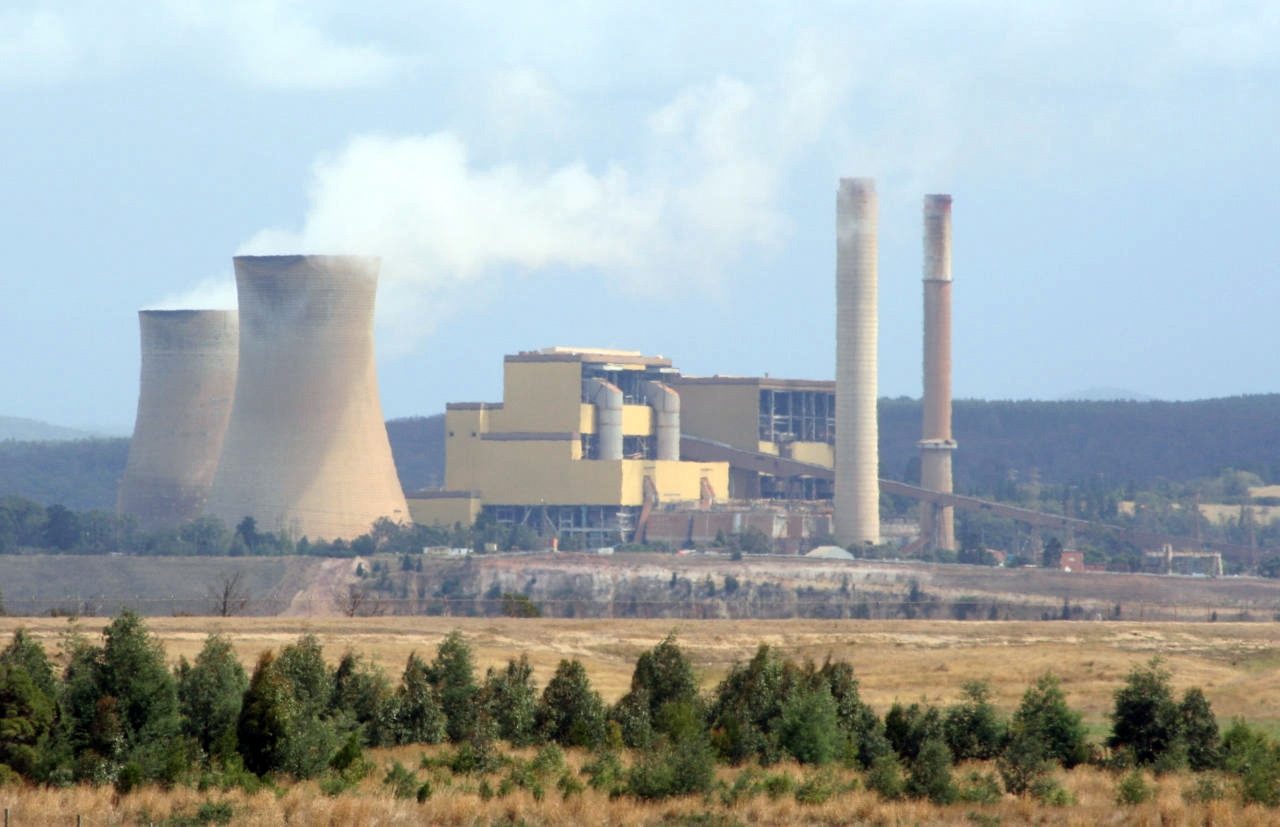
The Yallourn Power Station in the Latrobe Valley

The following page lists all active and former power stations in Victoria, Australia. Power stations smaller than 1 MW in nameplate capacity are not listed.

Loy Yang is the largest power station by capacity in Victoria.

== Currently active ==
=== Coal fired ===
These fossil fuel power stations burn coal to generate some or all of the electricity they produce.

Power station	Maximum capacity	Emission intensity	Turbines	Coal type	Conveyance	Mine type	Cooling water	Ref
Loy Yang A	2,200 megawatts (3,000,000 hp)	1.17 tCO2-e/MWh	4	lignite	conveyors	open cut	fresh cooling tower	
Loy Yang B	1,050 megawatts (1,410,000 hp)	1.14 tCO_{2}/MWh	2	lignite	conveyors	open cut	fresh cooling tower	
Yallourn W	1,480 megawatts (1,980,000 hp)	1.33 tCO_{2}/MWh	4	lignite	conveyors	open cut	fresh cooling tower	

- Yallourn scheduled for closure in 2028.
- Loy Yang B scheduled for closure in 2046.
- Loy Yang A scheduled for closure in 2035.

=== Gas turbine ===
These gas turbine power stations use gas combustion to generate some or all of the electricity they produce.

Power station	Maximum capacity	Emission intensity	Turbines	Fuel type	Combined cycle	Ref
Bairnsdale	92 megawatts (123,000 hp)	0.53 tCO2-e/MWh	2	natural gas	no	
Jeeralang	432 megawatts (579,000 hp)	0.76 tCO2-e/MWh	7	natural gas	no	
Laverton North	320 megawatts (430,000 hp)	0.60 tCO2-e/MWh	2	natural gas	no	
Longford	31.8 megawatts (42,600 hp)		6	natural gas	no	
Mortlake	550 megawatts (740,000 hp)	0.55 tCO2-e/MWh	2	natural gas	no	
Somerton	160 megawatts (210,000 hp)	0.72 tCO2-e/MWh	4	natural gas	no	
Valley Power	300 megawatts (400,000 hp)	0.76 tCO2-e/MWh	12	natural gas	no	

=== Gas (thermal) ===
These power stations use gas combustion to power steam turbines that generate some or all of the electricity they produce.

Power station	Maximum capacity	Emission intensity	Turbines	Fuel type
Newport	500 MW (670,000 hp)	0.53 tCO2-e/MWh	1	natural gas

=== Gas (reciprocating) ===
These power stations use gas combustion in reciprocating engines to generate some or all of the electricity they produce.

Power station	Maximum capacity	Emission intensity	Engines	Fuel type	Ref
Boral Western Landfill, Ravenhall	4.6 megawatts (6,200 hp)		4	landfill gas	
Broadmeadows	6.2 megawatts (8,300 hp)	0.06 tCO2-e/MWh	6	landfill gas	
Brooklyn Landfill and Waste Recycling Facility	2.83 megawatts (3,800 hp)	0.06 tCO2-e/MWh	3	landfill gas	
Clayton	11 megawatts (15,000 hp)	0.06 tCO2-e/MWh	11	landfill gas	
Corio (EDL)	1 megawatt (1,300 hp)	0.06 tCO2-e/MWh	1	landfill gas	
Mornington Waste Disposal Facility	1 megawatt (1,300 hp)	0.06 tCO2-e/MWh	1	landfill gas	
Morwell (Tramway Road) (HRL)	5 megawatts (6,700 hp)		1	diesel	
Narre Warren	7.2 megawatts (9,700 hp)		5	landfill gas	
Shepparton Wastewater Treatment Facility	1.1 megawatts (1,475 hp)	0.06 tCO2-e/MWh	1	sewage gas	
Springvale	4.2 megawatts (5,600 hp)	0.06 tCO2-e/MWh	4	landfill gas	
Sunshine Energy Park	8.7 megawatts (11,700 hp)		1	landfill gas	
Tatura Biogas Generator	1.1 megawatts (1,475 hp)		1	sewage gas	
Werribee (AGL Energy)	7.8 megawatts (10,500 hp)	0.05 tCO2-e/MWh	7	sewage gas	
Wyndham Waste Disposal Facility	1 megawatt (1,300 hp)	0.05 tCO2-e/MWh	1	landfill gas	

=== Hydroelectric ===
These hydroelectric power stations use the flow of water to generate some or all of the electricity they produce.

Power station	Maximum capacity	Turbines	Pumped storage	Ref
Banimboola	12.85 megawatts (17,230 hp)	3	no	
Blue Rock Dam	3.6 megawatts (4,800 hp)	1	no	
Bogong	140 megawatts (190,000 hp)	2	no	
Cairn Curran	2 megawatts (2,700 hp)	1	no	
Cardinia Reservoir	3.5 megawatts (4,700 hp)	?	no	
Clover	24 megawatts (32,000 hp)	2	no	
Dartmouth	150 megawatts (200,000 hp)	1	no	
Eildon	120 megawatts (160,000 hp)	4	no	
Eildon Pondage	4.5 megawatts (6,000 hp)	1	no	
Eppalock	2.4 megawatts (3,200 hp)	?	no	
Glenmaggie	3.8 megawatts (5,100 hp)	2	no	
McKay Creek	150 megawatts (200,000 hp)	6	no	
Olinda	1 megawatt (1,300 hp)	1	no	
Preston	1.86 megawatts (2,490 hp)	1	no	
Rubicon Scheme	13.5 megawatts (18,100 hp)	1	no	
Silvan	2.06 megawatts (2,760 hp)	1	no	
Sugarloaf	decommissioned			
Thomson Dam	7.5 megawatts (10,100 hp)	1	no	
Upper Yarra Reservoir	1.13 megawatts (1,520 hp)	1	no	
West Kiewa	62 megawatts (83,000 hp)	2	no	
William Hovell	1.5 megawatts (2,000 hp)	1	no	
Yarrawonga Weir	9.45 megawatts (12,670 hp)	2	no	

=== Solar ===
Project name	Sponsoring company	location	Coordinates	Technology	Capacity (MW_{AC})	Status	Completion date	Notes
Bannerton Solar Park	Foresight Solar Australia	Bannerton	34°41′18″S 142°46′51″E	PV single axis tracking	110	Operating	2018	
Gannawarra Solar Farm	Wirsol	Lalbert	35°44′06″S 143°46′55″E	PV single axis tracking	50	Operating	November 2018	
Karadoc Solar Farm	Overland Sun Farming	Iraak	34°24′56″S 142°15′08″E	PV tracking flat panel	90	Operating	March 2019	
Numurkah Solar Farm	Neoen	Numurkah	36°09′33″S 145°28′24″E		112	Operating	July 2019	
Swan Hill Solar Farm	Australian Solar Group & IIG	Swan Hill	35°20′40″S 143°31′20″E	PV single axis tracking	19	Operating	July 2018	
Yatpool Solar Farm	Overland Sun Farming	Yatpool	34°23′46″S 142°10′30″E	PV tracking flat panel	81	Operating	Late 2019	
Wemen Solar Farm	Wirsol	Liparoo	34°48′09″S 142°32′40″E	PV single axis tracking	97.5	Operating	October 2018	

=== Wind farms ===
Victoria has around 3 GW of wind power.

=== Biomass combustion ===
These power stations burn biomass (biofuel) to generate some or all of the electricity they produce.

Power station	Maximum capacity	Turbines	Fuel type	Conveyance	Ref
Paperlinx, Maryvale	54.5 megawatts (73,100 hp)	4	black liquor	on-site	

=== Battery storage ===
Power station	Owner/operator	Capacity (MW)	Storage (MWh)	Units	Energised	Fuel type
Victorian Big Battery	Neoen	300	450		2021	
Melbourne Renewable Energy Hub	SEC	100	200		2025	
Rangebank	Eku	200	400		2024	
Koorangie	Sosteneo	185	370		2025	
Riverina	Edify Energy	125	260		2023	
Hazelwood	Engie	150	150		2023	
Mornington	Valent Energy	240	480		2026 (under construction)	

== Decommissioned power stations ==
Station	Type	Commissioned	Decommissioned	Maximum capacity		Notes
Station	Type	Commissioned	Decommissioned	MW	hp	Notes
Anglesea	Coal	1969	2015	150	200,000	
Ballarat A	Coal	1905	??			
Ballarat B	Coal	1954	??	20	27,000	
Cassilis	Hydro	1909	??			
Energy Brix	Coal	1956	2014	165	221,000	
Geelong A	Coal	1900	1961	10.5	14,100	
Geelong B	Coal	1954	1970	30	40,000	
Hamilton	Diesel	1954	??	3	4,000	
Hazelwood	Coal	1964	2017	1,600	2,100,000	
Horsham	Coal	1913	??			
Korumburra	Coal	??	??			
Mildura	Oil	1909?	??			
Newport A	Coal	1918	1979	95.5	128,100	
Newport B	Coal	1923	1970s	90	120,000	
Newport C	Coal	1950	1981	120	160,000	
Redcliffs	Coal	1954	??	10	13,000	
Richmond	Coal	1891	1980	50	67,000	
Shepparton	Diesel	1951	??	10.5	14,100	
Spencer Street	Coal	1892	1982	109	146,000	(1969)
Sugarloaf	Mini-hydro	1929	c. 2010	4	5,400	
Swan Hill	Oil	1910?	??			
Toora	Hydro	1916	??			
Warragul	Hydro	1922	??			
Warrnambool	Diesel	1953	??	5	6,700	
Yallourn A	Coal	1924	1968	75	101,000	
Yallourn B	Coal	1932	1970s	100	130,000	
Yallourn C	Coal	1954	1984	100	130,000	
Yallourn D	Coal	1957	1986	100	130,000	
Yallourn E	Coal	1961	1989	240	320,000	
Yarram	Hydro	1920?	??			

== See also ==
- List of power stations in Australia
- List of coal power stations
- List of largest power stations in the world

== Notes ==
- R. Arklay and I. Sayer - 'Geelong's Electric Supply' - September 1970
- Edwards, Cecil (1969). Brown Power. A jubilee history of the SECV. State Electricity Commission of Victoria.
