= Gannawarra Energy Storage System =

Electricity grid battery storage in Victoria, Australia

- Country: Australia
- Coordinates: 35°44′02″S 143°46′48″E
- Status: Operational
- Commission date: October 2018
- Construction cost: 41.19 million AU$ (2018)
- Owners: Edify Energy; Wirsol
- Operator: EnergyAustralia

Power generation
- Nameplate capacity: 25 MW
- Storage capacity: 50 MW h

External links
- Website: wirsol.com.au/portfolio/gannawarra-energy-storage-system/

Gannawarra Energy Storage System (GESS) is a grid-connected energy storage system adjacent to the Gannawarra Solar Farm in Wandella in the Shire of Gannawarra, 14km west of Kerang.

The Gannawarra Energy Storage System was partially funded by grants from the Australian Renewable Energy Agency and the Victorian Government. It is owned by Wirsol and Edify Energy and operated by EnergyAustralia. The batteries were provided by Tesla, Inc. and Engineering, procurement and construction was provided by RCR Tomlinson. It helps to ease the demand on a constrained transmission line and balances higher levels of renewable energy on the grid. It first exported electricity to the grid in October 2018.
