= Centre for Appropriate Technology =

Centre for Appropriate Technology may refer to:

- Centre for Appropriate Technology (Australia)
- El Centro Integrado de Technologia Appropriada (CITA) (Cuba)

== See also ==
- Centre for Alternative Technology
