= Lakeland Solar Project =

Solar farm in Queensland, Australia

Coordinates: 15°52′07″S 144°51′43″E

The Lakeland Solar Project is a solar farm at Lakeland in Far North Queensland, Australia. The 23 hectare site is positioned off the Mulligan Highway. The project combines big battery storage with big solar. It consists of 41,440 solar panels. Construction began in October 2016.

The solar farm uses islanding to supply power to Lakeland without connecting to the wider grid. The power station can generate 13 megawatts (MW) of power. The battery is rated at 1.4 MW/5.32 MWh.

== See also ==
- List of solar farms in Queensland
