= Emerald Solar Park =

Solar power station in Queensland, Australia

- Country: Australia
- Location: Emerald, Queensland
- Coordinates: 23.51°S 148.137953°E
- Status: Operational
- Construction began: October 2017
- Commission date: October 2018
- Owner: Lighthouse Solar Fund

Solar farm
- Type: Flat-panel PV
- Site area: 160 hectares (400 acres)

Power generation
- Nameplate capacity: 72 MW

External links
- Website: www.emerald-solar.com.au

Emerald Solar Park is a photovoltaic solar power station near Emerald in Queensland, Australia. It was developed by RES Australia who then sold it to Lighthouse Solar Fund. It delivers up to 72 MW AC of electricity to the National Electricity Market. The entire production of the solar farm is contracted to be supplied to Telstra.

== Construction ==
Construction of the solar park began in October 2017. The prime contractor for construction was RCR Tomlinson under an EPC arrangement. RCR went into administration in November 2018 just prior to facility completion and full production was delayed until February 2019. ENcome Energy Performance have been appointed as O&M contractor with RES Group as Asset Managers.

The project consists of 32 SMA supplied inverters, Solar modules were supplied by Canadian Solar mounted on Next Tracker solar tracking system. The project connects into the Ergon's 66 kV network.

== See also ==
- List of solar farms in Queensland
