= Kilmore Gap =

Mountain pass in Victoria, Australia

Kilmore Gap is a broad and low saddle located between Wallan and Kilmore in Victoria, Australia.

== Geography ==
It forms a break in the Great Dividing Range, separating the Western Highlands from the more mountainous Eastern Highlands. At its lowest point, it is approximately 335 metres (1,099 ft) above sea level (AHD). Located on the Kilmore Gap is Pretty Sally or Pretty Sally Hill.

== Transport ==
It serves as a gateway to the interior plains from Melbourne and surrounding settlements, and as such has developed as a major transport corridor, including the Hume Highway and a rail line, both of which are principal links between Melbourne and Sydney. It is also used by VFR flights on the Melbourne Inland Route from Sugarloaf Reservoir to Kilmore.

== Climate ==
The Bureau of Meteorology operates a weather station known as Wallan (Kilmore Gap) established in 1993. The saddle is highly exposed to the west-southwest at an altitude of 528 metres (1,732 ft) and is commonly met with sleet and at times, snow. Winters are very rainy, averaging around 20 days of precipitation in each winter month, although these tend to be light and misty. Storms are most common from late winter to mid spring, in which graupel is a frequent occurrence.

Climate data for Wallan (Kilmore Gap, 1993–2022); 528 m AMSL; 37.38° S, 144.97° E
Month	Jan	Feb	Mar	Apr	May	Jun	Jul	Aug	Sep	Oct	Nov	Dec	Year
Record high °C (°F)	43.2 (109.8)	42.7 (108.9)	36.7 (98.1)	30.7 (87.3)	23.3 (73.9)	19.6 (67.3)	16.4 (61.5)	18.4 (65.1)	24.3 (75.7)	31.1 (88.0)	38.1 (100.6)	40.7 (105.3)	43.2 (109.8)
Mean daily maximum °C (°F)	25.3 (77.5)	24.6 (76.3)	21.6 (70.9)	17.1 (62.8)	12.9 (55.2)	9.9 (49.8)	9.2 (48.6)	10.6 (51.1)	13.2 (55.8)	16.3 (61.3)	19.6 (67.3)	22.4 (72.3)	16.9 (62.4)
Mean daily minimum °C (°F)	12.5 (54.5)	12.6 (54.7)	11.1 (52.0)	9.0 (48.2)	6.9 (44.4)	4.9 (40.8)	4.0 (39.2)	4.3 (39.7)	5.7 (42.3)	6.9 (44.4)	9.0 (48.2)	10.3 (50.5)	8.1 (46.6)
Record low °C (°F)	4.5 (40.1)	5.4 (41.7)	3.6 (38.5)	1.7 (35.1)	−1.6 (29.1)	−0.2 (31.6)	−0.8 (30.6)	−1.4 (29.5)	−1.9 (28.6)	0.1 (32.2)	0.7 (33.3)	3.0 (37.4)	−1.9 (28.6)
Average precipitation mm (inches)	50.4 (1.98)	43.9 (1.73)	48.1 (1.89)	56.9 (2.24)	59.1 (2.33)	70.1 (2.76)	59.8 (2.35)	64.1 (2.52)	61.3 (2.41)	57.4 (2.26)	69.4 (2.73)	45.6 (1.80)	701.3 (27.61)
Average precipitation days (≥ 0.2 mm)	9.6	9.1	11.9	13.7	17.5	20.1	21.6	19.5	15.8	15.0	12.9	10.2	176.9
Average afternoon relative humidity (%)	48	49	51	59	73	81	81	74	68	61	56	51	63
Source: Bureau of Meteorology; Wallan (Kilmore Gap)
