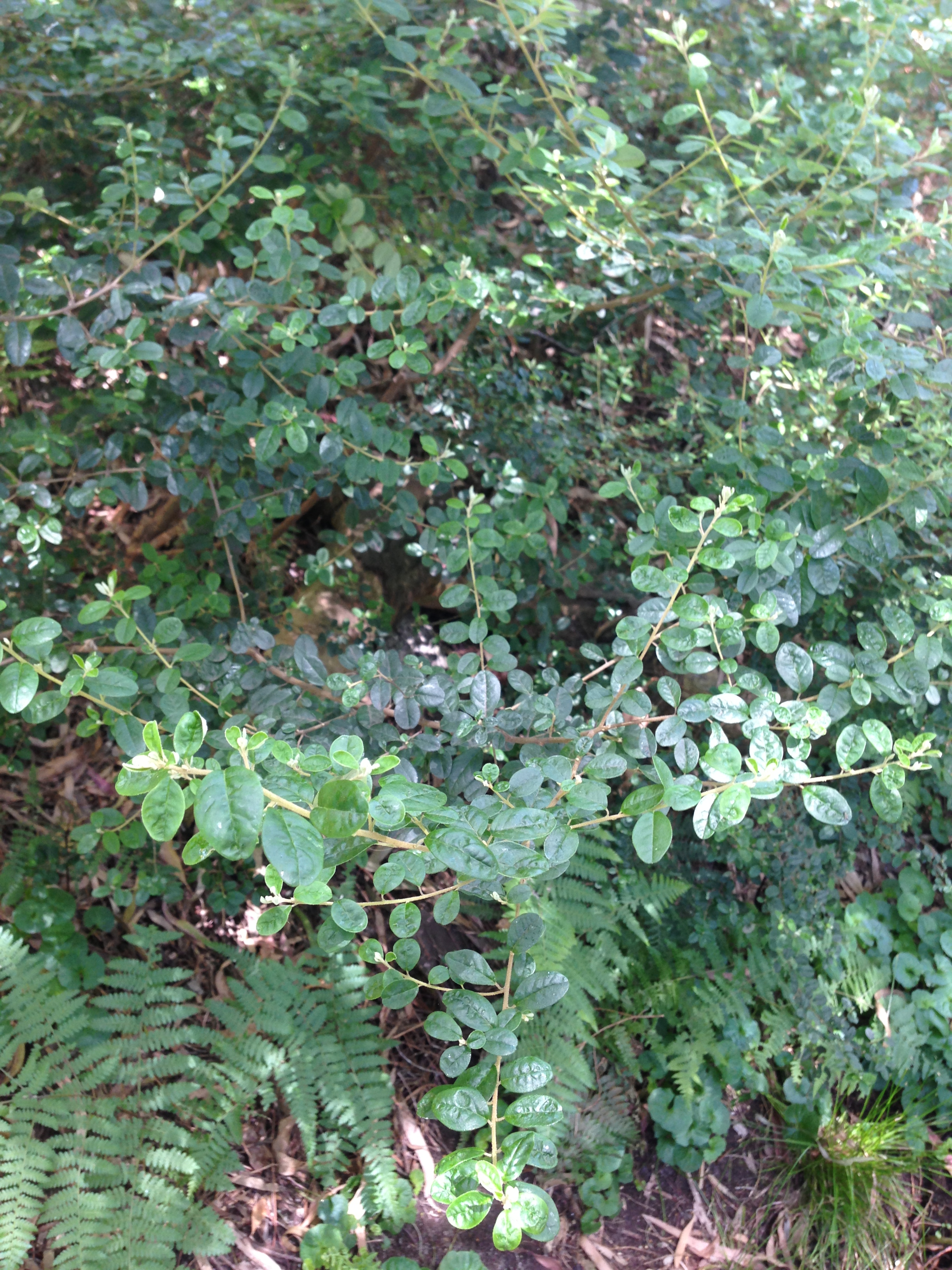

Conservation status
- Critically endangered (EPBC Act)

Scientific classification
- Kingdom: Plantae
- Clade: Tracheophytes
- Clade: Angiosperms
- Clade: Eudicots
- Clade: Rosids
- Order: Rosales
- Family: Rhamnaceae
- Genus: Pomaderris
- Species: P. vacciniifolia

Binomial name
- Pomaderris vacciniifolia Reissek

Synonyms
- Pomaderris phillyraefolia Reissek orth. var.; Pomaderris phillyreifolia F.Muell. ex Reissek nom. inval., pro syn.; Pomaderris phyllirifolia A.D.Chapm. orth. var.

= Pomaderris vacciniifolia =

Round-leaf pomaderris

Species of shrub

Pomaderris vacciniifolia, commonly known as round-leaf pomaderris, is a species of flowering plant in the family Rhamnaceae and is endemic to Victoria in Australia. It is a shrub with softly-hairy branchlets, elliptic leaves and panicles of creamy-white flowers.

== Description ==
Pomaderris vacciniifolia is a shrub that typically grows to a height of 1–4 m (3 ft 3 in – 13 ft 1 in), its branchlets densely covered with soft, greyish, star-shaped hairs. The leaves are elliptic, mostly 12–15 mm (0.47–0.59 in) long and 8–10 mm (0.31–0.39 in) wide. The upper surface of the leaves is glabrous and the lower surface is densely covered with soft, whitish, star-shaped hairs. There are stipules 1.5–2.0 mm (0.059–0.079 in) long at the base of the leaves, but that fall off as the leaf matures. The flowers are borne in panicles 10–40 mm (0.39–1.57 in) long, each flower on a pedicel 2–3 mm (0.079–0.118 in). The flowers are creamy-white and covered with soft, greyish, star-shaped hairs. The sepals are 1.5–2.0 mm (0.059–0.079 in) long, and fall off as the flower matures and the petals are 1.2–1.5 mm (0.047–0.059 in) long but fall off as the flowers open. Flowering occurs in October.

== Taxonomy ==
Pomaderris vacciniifolia was first formally described in 1858 by Siegfried Reissek in the journal Linnaea: Ein Journal für die Botanik in ihrem ganzen Umfange from specimens collected by Ferdinand von Mueller near Watts River.

== Distribution and habitat ==
Round-leaf pomaderris grows in moist forest and scrub, mostly in the upper and middle catchments of the Yarra River between Healesville, Eltham and Flowerdale.

== Conservation status ==
Pomaderris vacciniifolia is classified as 'critically endangered' under the Australian Government Environment Protection and Biodiversity Conservation Act 1999 and under the Victorian Government Flora and Fauna Guarantee Act 1988. The main threats to the species include weed invasion, grazing by herbivores and road maintenance.

In 2008, the plant's conservation status was highlighted when it was revealed that several plants had branches removed during construction of the North–South Pipeline.

According to Melbourne Museum, the only significant remaining wild population of the round-leaf pomaderris is at Toolangi, about 70 km (43 mi) north east of Melbourne. Factors in the decline of the species include browsing by feral deer, land clearing, and the 2009 Black Saturday bushfires.
