= Bannerton =

Bannerton may refer to

- Bannerton, Victoria, a locality in north-western Victoria, Australia
- Bannerton Solar Park, a solar power station in the locality
