= List of solar farms in Queensland =

This is a list of solar farms in Queensland, Australia. There has been significant growth in this area recently, with an estimated 17298 MW of solar capacity either operational, planned or under construction.

== Table ==
Project name	Sponsoring company	Coordinates	Capacity (MW) (AC)	Status	Notes
Daydream Solar Farm	Edify Energy	20.494622°S 147.746973°E	150	Operating	180 MW DC capacity. Started commercial operations in August 2018. Originally developed by Solar Choice.
Sun Metals Solar Farm	Sun Metals	19.437°S 146.696°E	124	Operating	124 MW AC capacity. Started exporting to the grid in May 2018.
Ross River Solar Farm	Palisade	19.425°S 146.716°E	128	Operating	Started exporting to the grid in September 2018.
Darling Downs Solar Farm	APA Group	27.112°S 150.882°E	110	Operating	Started exporting to the grid in September 2018.
Clare Solar Farm	Fotowatio Renewable Ventures	19.840°S 147.211°E	100	Operating	Started exporting to the grid in May 2018.
Emerald Solar Park	RES Group	23.510006°S 148.137953°E	68	Operating	Started exporting to the grid in October 2018.
Hamilton Solar Farm	Wirsol and Edify Energy	20.494401°S 147.771521°E	57.5	Operating	Started exporting to the grid in March 2018.
Hayman Solar Farm	Edify Energy	20.494683°S 147.748475°E	50	Operating	Started commercial operations in August 2018.
Whitsunday Solar Farm	Wirsol and Edify Energy	20.504823°S 147.767454°E	57.5	Operating	Started exporting to the grid in March 2018.
Kidston Solar Project KS1	Genex Power	18.880°S 144.151°E	50	Operating	50 MW stage started exporting to the grid in November 2017.
Kidston Solar Project KS2	Genex Power	18.884°S 144.124°E	270	Announced	EPBC approval pending 11 January 2019, Referral Number 2018/8229.
Aldoga Solar Farm	Acciona Australia	23.801°S 151.054°E	265	Approved	Construction aimed to start in early-mid-2022. EPBC approval 25 September 2018 (EPBC Referral 2018/8251)
Aramara Solar Farm		25.572°S 149.854°E	140	Approved	
Baralaba Solar Farm	Fotowatio Renewable Ventures	24.195°S 152.329°E	92	Announced	
Barunggam Solar Farm	Ubergy	26.685°S 150.765°E	140	Announced	Site location in cited article believed incorrect. Coordinates provided +/- 3 km accuracy
Beelbee Solar Farm	APA Group	27.145°S 150.824°E	150+	Approved	150–240 MW planned.
Baking Board Solar Farm	Impact Investment Group	26.723°S 150.553°E	19.9	Operating	
Barcaldine RC Solar Farm	Elecnor	23.547°S 145.318°E	20	Operating	A further 40 MW proposed
Blackwater Solar Farm	Blackwater Solar Farm Pty Ltd	23.597°S 148.753°E	150	Approved	Approved 11 Aug 2017
Blair Athol Solar Power Station	TerraCom Limited	22.691°S 147.542°E	60	Announced	
Blue Grass Solar Farm	X-Elio Australia Pty Ltd	26.680°S 150.493°E	102	Approved	Decision Notice Nov 2018
Bluewater Solar Farm	Fotowatio Renewable Ventures	19.145°S 146.485°E	148	Announced	EPBC approval obtained
Bluff Solar Farm	Infigen Energy	23.598°S 149.039°E	260	Announced	
Bouldercombe Solar Farm	Eco Energy World	23.525°S 150.499°E	280	Approved	
Bowen Solar Farm	Infigen Energy	20.076°S 148.216°E	100	Announced	EPBC Referral reference 2017/8123 pending approvals 2 Nov 2018
Brigalow Solar Farm	Impact Investment Group	27.690°S 151.564°E	34.5	Approved	
Broadlea Solar Farm	Eco Energy World	21.862°S 148.170°E	100	Approved	
Bucca Solar Farm	PB Enertec Pry Ltd	24.939°S 152.080°E	108.8	Approved	Approved 21 Dec 2018 PD on Line Reference Number 522.2018.108.1
Bulli Creek Solar Farm	Solar Choice	28.021°S 150.878°E	2000	Approved	Original developer Solar Choice acquired 100% ownership in June 2021
Bullyard Solar Farm	EIWA Solar Bundaberg Pry Ltd	24.938°S 152.015°E	92	Approved	Approved 8 Nov 2018 PD on Line Reference Number 522.2018.70.1
Burdekin Solar Farm	Cleangen	19.880°S 147.165°E	140	Approved	Approved
Cameby Solar Farm	X-Elio	26.682°S 150.510°E	148	Approved	Approved Nov 2018
Cape York Solar Storage	Lyon Group	15.898°S 144.857°E	55	Approved	Approved July 2017
Chewco Solar Energy Farm	Tilt Renewables	17.047°S 145.384°E	75	Announced	Fact Sheet August 2017
Childers Solar Farm	Elliot Green Power	25.303°S 152.403°E	56	Operating	56 MW AC, 75 MW DC. Started exporting to the grid in March 2019.
Childers DDN Green Solar Farm	DDN Green	24.923°S 152.294°E	42	Announced	Development application lodged 23 October 2018 PD on Line Reference Number 522.2017.88.1
Chinchilla Solar Farm	First Solar	26.670°S 150.793°E	100	Approved	
Clarke Creek Wind and Solar Farm	Lacour Energy	22.656°S 149.347°E	400	Approved	
Clermont Solar Farm	Wirsol	22.839°S 147.581°E	75	Operating	Started exporting to the grid in June 2019.
Cloncurry (Solarvoltaic) Solar Farm	Infigen Energy	20.706°S 140.509°E	30	Announced	
Collinsville Solar PV	Ratch Australia	20.538°S 147.807°E	42.5	Operating	
Comet Solar Farm	Hadstone Energy /Comet Solar Farm Pty Ltd	23.613°S 148.770°E	235	Approved	Due to commission on 30 November 2018.
Columboola Solar Farm	Luminous Energy	26.636°S 150.296°E	310	Approved	
Crinum Creek Solar Farm	Adani	23.031°S 148.340°E	100	Announced	GMUSG-SACOME-Conference Aug 2016
Dalby Solar Farm RES	RES	27.208°S 151.308°E	22	Approved	
Daystar Energy Solar Farm	Daystar Energy	26.643°S 150.290°E	100	Approved	Decision Notice Oct 18
Delga Solar Farm	Shell	26.274°S 149.749°E	250	Approved	
Desailly Renewable Energy Park	DP Energy	16.488°S 145.384°E	250	Announced	Development application lodged project website
Dingo Solar Farm	ESCO Pacific	23.634°S 149.383°E	85	Announced	
Dunblane Solar Farm	YD Projects	23.540294°S 145.275339°E	11	Operating	
Dysart Solar Energy Farm	Tilt Renewables	22.579°S 148.368°E	150	Approved	Project approval
Dysart Solar Farm	Hanwha	22.514°S 148.504°E	130	Announced	
Edenvale Solar Farm	Edenvale Solar Park Pty Ltd	26.932°S 150.583°E	280	Approved	
Everleigh Solar Farm	Everleigh Solar Park Pty Ltd	26.913°S 150.586°E	150	Approved	Decision Notice Project and owner name are correct
Gooburrum Solar Farm	PB Enertec Pry Ltd	24.807°S 152.319°E	4	Approved	Approved 15 Dec 2017 PD on Line Reference Number 522.2017.26.1
Gregory Solar Farm	Engie Renewables Australia	23.143°S 148.447°E	215	Approved	
Gumlu Solar Farm	RJ Gordon Solar Consultants	19.871°S 147.668°E	60	Announced	
Gympie Regional Energy Hub	SolarQ	26.094°S 152.443°E	350	Approved	350 MW approved, 1000 MW additional in planning.
Harlin Solar Farm	Sunshine Energy	26.948°S 152.410°E	1500	Under construction	Construction began in February 2019. There are plans to add a 500MWh battery storage facility.
Haughton Solar Farm	Pacific Blue	19.731°S 147.073°E	100	Operating	First 100 MW stage began exporting to the grid in June 2019. It is believed the other stages have not begun construction.
Hughenden Sun Farm	Lighthouse Solar	20.854°S 144.186°E	22.5	Operating	Construction started in September 2017 and production commenced in September 2018.
Kelsey Creek Solar Farm	KCSF Consortium	20.449°S 148.539°E	50	Announced	
Kennedy Energy Park	Windlab / Eurus	20.935°S 144.315°E	15	Under construction	First 15 MW stage commenced. Further 650 MW stage had not begun as of November 2018.
Kingaroy Solar Farm	Terrain Energy	26.538°S 151.886°E	40	Announced	Development approval refused 23 Nov 2018, appeal lodged against Council decision and pending
Koberinga Solar Farm	ESCO Pacific	19.826°S 147.527°E	55	Announced	
Lakeland Solar Farm	Conergy Australia, now rebranded as Blueleaf Energy	15.868°S 144.862°E	10.8	Operating	
Lilyvale Solar Farm	Fotowatio Renewable Ventures	23.070°S 148.423°E	100	Operating	Started exporting to the grid in March 2019.
Longreach Solar Farm	Canadian Solar	23.44993°S 144.361703°E	15	Operating	
Majors Creek Solar Farm	Edify	19.582°S 146.862°E	200	Announced	EPBC approval 20 July 2017 EPBC Reference 2017/7963 Town planning report
Mareeba Solar Farm	CleanGen	16.000°S 145.400°E	60	Approved	
Mica Creek Solar Farm	APA Group	20.81027°S 139.49365°E	88	Operating	
Middlemount Solar Farm	Overland	22.824°S 148.723°E	28	Operating	
Mirani Solar Farm	ESCO Pacific	21.146°S 148.830°E	60	Approved	
Moura Solar Farm	ESCO Pacific	24.514°S 150.084°E	110	Announced	
Munna Creek Solar Farm	Renewable Energy System Technologies	25.892°S 152.469°E	120	Operating	
Normanton Solar Farm	Scouller Energy	17.681°S 141.050°E	5	Operating	
Oakdene Solar Farm	juwi	26.710°S 150.725°E	100	Announced	Development approval subject to appeal Mar 2019
Oakey Solar Farm	Canadian Solar Australia / RE Oakey	27.407166°S 151.660702°E	25	Operating	Oakey 1 (25MW) started exporting to the grid in March 2019. Oakey 2 (55MW) had not started exporting to the grid as of July 2019.
Paget Solar Farm	BOMA Group	21.190°S 149.165°E	20	Announced	
Qunaba Solar Farm	PB Enertec Pry Ltd	24.901°S 152.436°E	77	Approved	Approved 21 Dec 2018 PD on Line Reference Number 522.2018.113.1
Raglan Solar Farm	Eco Energy World	23.758°S 150.850°E	350	Approved	
Rodds Bay Solar Farm	Renew Estate	24.189°S 151.585°E	250	Approved	
Rolleston Solar Farm	RES Group	24.396°S 148.473°E	90	Approved	
Rollingstone Solar Farm	ESCO Pacific	19.013°S 146.407°E	110	Approved	
Rugby Run Solar Farm	Adani Australia	22.084°S 147.870°E	65	Operating	Started exporting to the grid in May 2019.
Susan River Solar Farm	Elliot Green Power	25.417°S 152.744°E	75	Operating	75 MW AC, 95 MW DC. Started exporting to the grid in December 2018. Officially opened in February 2019.
Sunshine Coast Solar Farm	Sunshine Coast Regional Council	26.560°S 153.026°E	15	Operating	
Tieri Solar Farm	Fotowatio Renewable Ventures	23.096°S 148.045°E	96	Approved	
Tumuruu BESS & Solar Farm	Australian Solar Enterprises	26.502227°S 152.062121°E	400	Announced	
Wandoan Solar Project	Equis	26.248°S 149.764°E	1000	Approved	
Warhook Solar Project	Engie Renewables Australia	26.612°S 150.259°E	200	Approved	
Warwick Solar Farm	University of Queensland	28.189°S 152.060°E	64	Operating	Construction started in April 2019.
Western Downs Green Power Hub	Neoen	26.955°S 150.677°E	460	Operating	Paired with 200 MW/400 MWh of battery storage.
Western Downs Solar Farm	Tilt Renewables	26.937°S 150.707°E	250	Announced	
Woolooga Energy Park	LGI Limited	26.076°S 152.487°E	185	Announced	
Yarranlea Solar Farm	Risen	27.7074°S 151.527°E	100	Operating	Construction started 23 July 2018

Summary of capacity

Status	Capacity (MW)
Operating	1609.5
Under construction	1726.9
Approved	7904.3
Announced	2852
Total	14092.7
