= Whitsunday Solar Farm =

Solar farm in Queensland, Australia

Coordinates: 20°29′34″S 147°45′20″E

The Whitsunday Solar Farm is a solar farm located at Collinsville in North Queensland, Australia. It has a generating capacity of 57.5 megawatts. Operations commenced in 2018. The power station is jointly owned by Edify Energy and Wirsol. It is co-located at the same site as the Hamilton Solar Farm and the Daydream Solar Farm.

== See also ==
- List of solar farms in Queensland
