= Wemen Solar Farm =

Solar farm in northwestern Victoria, Australia

- Country: Australia
- Coordinates: 34°48′07″S 142°32′38″E
- Status: Operational
- Commission date: February 2019
- Owner: Wirsol

Solar farm
- Type: Standard PV
- Solar tracker: Single-axis

Power generation
- Nameplate capacity: 97.5 MW

External links
- Website: www.wemensolarfarm.com.au

Wemen Solar Farm is a photovoltaic power station in northwestern Victoria, Australia. It was constructed by RCR and Laing O’Rourke for owner Wirsol Energy, completed in 2018.
