= Gannawarra Solar Farm =

- Country: Australia
- Location: 13km west of Kerang
- Coordinates: 35.735459°S 143.781739°E
- Status: Operational
- Commission date: April 2018
- Owners: Wirsol (94.9%), Edify Energy (5.1%)

Solar farm
- Type: Flat-panel PV
- Site area: 132.4 hectares (327 acres)

Power generation
- Nameplate capacity: 50.61 MW
- Capacity factor: 26.6%
- Annual net output: 118 GW·h

External links
- Website: wirsol.com.au/portfolio/gannawarra-solar-farm/

Gannawarra Solar Farm is a photovoltaic solar power station in the Gannawarra Shire, 13 kilometres (8.1 mi) west of Kerang in the Australian state of Victoria. It generates up to 60 MW_{dc} electricity and exports up to 50.61 MW_{AC} to the National Electricity Market at 66 kV.

Solar Choice was the originating developer of the Gannawarra Solar Farm securing the site and early-stage development approvals before the project was acquired by Edify Energy. It was first connected to the grid by Powercor Australia in April 2018. It is 94.9% owned by WIRSOL, a brand of Wircon GmbH and 5.1% owned by the developer Edify Energy who is also the longterm asset manager of the project. It consists of JA Solar modules with ATI DuraTrack mounting system and SMA 2500 SC-EV inverters. It was financed in a single package with the Whitsunday Solar Farm and Hamilton Solar Farm, both in Queensland, which projects were also developed and are managed by Edify Energy. The engineering, procurement, and construction was provided by RCR Tomlinson.

The Gannawarra Solar Farm is integrated with the Gannawarra Energy Storage System consisting of a 25 MW / 50 MW·h Tesla Powerpack battery (2 hours). This project was developed and is 50.01% owned by Edify Energy, who also manage this project. Edify started operating a 185 MW / 370 MW·h battery energy storage system (2 hours) at the same site in 2025.
