= Hughenden Solar Farm =

Solar farm in Queensland, Australia

Coordinates: 20°51′17″S 144°11′11″E

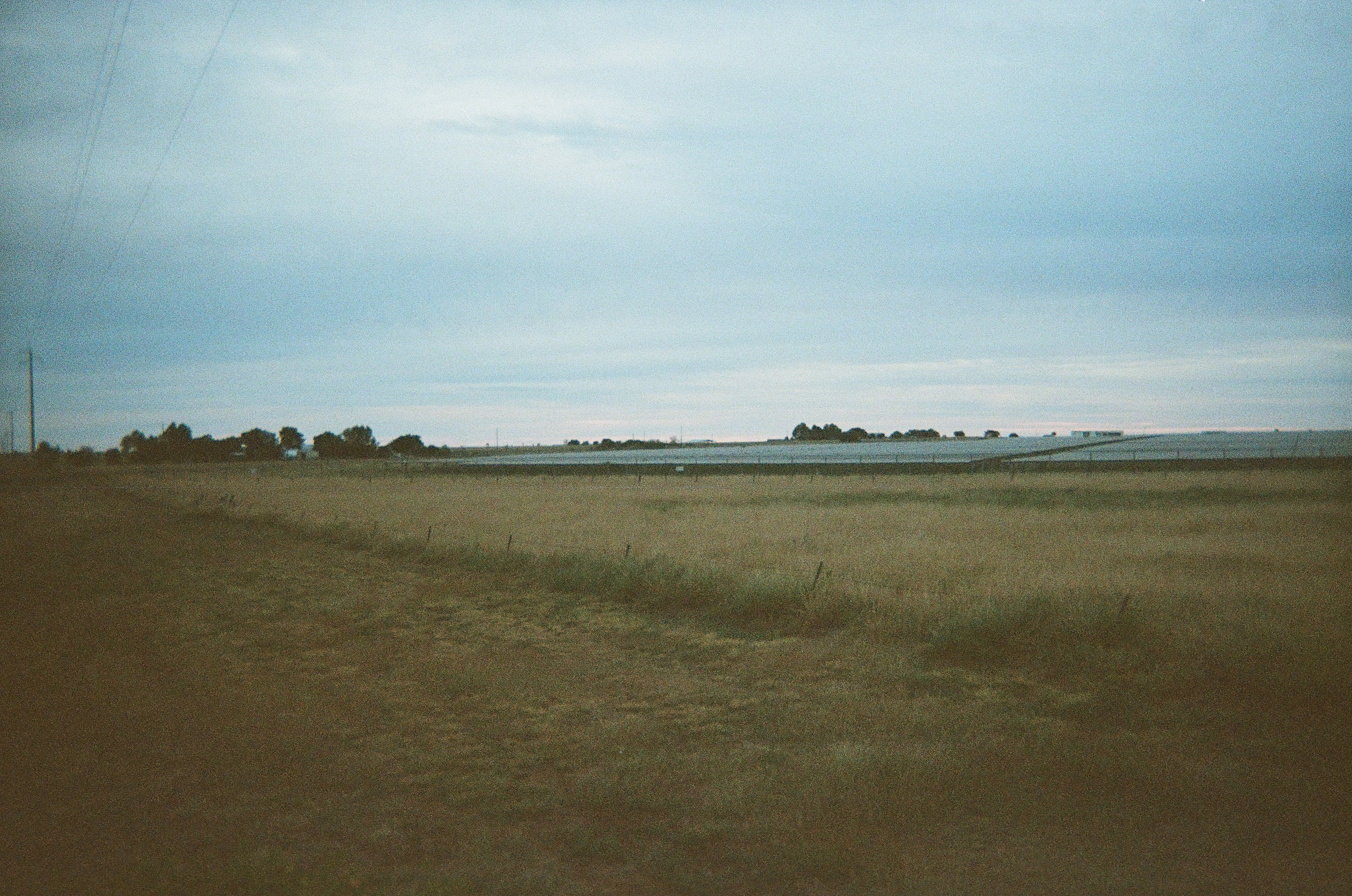
The solar farm in June 2025

The Hughenden Solar Farm is a solar farm at Hughenden in North West Queensland, Australia. The power station was constructed by BayWa, beginning in 2017. Construction was completed in 2018. Lighthouse Infrastructure bought the solar farm from Baywa who continue to operate and manage the plant.

The power station can generate 20.16 megawatts.

CS Energy has signed a Power Purchase Agreement with Hughenden Solar Farm.

== See also ==
- List of solar farms in Queensland
