= Longreach Solar Farm =

Solar farm in Queensland, Australia

Coordinates: 23°26′46″S 144°21′33″E

The Longreach Solar Farm is a solar farm located ten kilometres east of Longreach in Central West Queensland, Australia. It has a generating capacity of 17.5 megawatts. The solar farm uses 53,000 single-axis tracking solar panels across a 50 hectare site. It was owned and operated by Canadian Solar Australia and Foresight. Foresight Solar Fund acquired the plant in 2022.

== See also ==
- List of solar farms in Queensland
