= Somerton Power Station =

- Country: Australia
- Location: Somerton, Victoria
- Coordinates: 37°37′54.48″S 144°57′10.8″E
- Status: Operational
- Commission date: 2003

Thermal power station
- Primary fuel: Natural gas

Power generation
- Units operational: 4
- Make and model: Alstom
- Nameplate capacity: 150 MW

The Somerton Power Station is an open cycle, gas turbine power station located in the Melbourne suburb of Somerton, Victoria, Australia. It is owned and operated by AGL Energy. The facility normally operates three or four hours at a time as a peaking power plant, but is able to run 24 hours a day, seven days a week if required.

The plant cost $125 million to build, with the 2003 opening being delayed by environmental concerns and technical issues. The plant uses four second-hand 37.5 MW GT-1 Frame 6B gas turbines, manufactured under license to GE by Alstom and Thomassen International.

== See also ==
List of power stations in Victoria
