= Pretty Sally =

- Location within Victoria

Highest point
- Elevation: 529 m (1,736 ft)
- Coordinates: 37°22′51″S 144°57′54″E

Geography
- Location: Victoria, Australia

Geology
- Last eruption: 8Ma BP

Pretty Sally or Pretty Sally Hill is a dormant volcanic cone located between Wallan and Kilmore in Victoria, Australia. It is 529 metres above sea level. It arises from the surrounding open undulating plains of the Kilmore Gap in the Great Dividing Range.

The original road to Sydney ran near the peak known as the Big Hill. Sally Smith (better known as "Pretty Sally") operated an unlicensed hotel there in the 1840s. She died falling under her cart after striking a stump.

The hill is skirted by a section of the Northern Highway, which was formerly part of the Hume Highway. By the 1930s Pretty Sally had gained a reputation as a notorious road accident black spot due a sharp turn near the crest of the hill. In 1979 the now closed Pretty Sally Roadhouse was used as the setting of Fat Nancy's in the film Mad Max.

A fire tower is staffed during the bushfire season, generally from December to March. There is also a trig station on the hill and the Telstra Pretty Sally Radio Terminal which was part of the now decommissioned Melbourne - Canberra - Sydney microwave radio system but is now used for Mobiles Phone and emergency services communications.

== Resources ==
- http://www.bonzle.com/c/a?a=p&p=25751&cmd=sp
- Little Photos are available of Pretty Sally Hill
- Approximate area of Pretty Sally Hill, with the point being the approximate highest point.
