= El Centro Integrado de Technologia Appropriada =

Cuban technology organization

El Centro Integrado de Tecnología Apropiada (CITA) is a Cuban appropriate technology organization. It is the equivalent of the UK's Centre for Alternative Technology. It is stationed at Camagüey (Circunvalación Norte).

In 2005 a representative of CITA participated in the "Public Seminar Series" of the International Institute for Resource Industries and Sustainability Studies (IRIS), on the topic Renewable Energy in Cuba: Sustainable Solutions for the Future (April, 2005).

== Sources ==
Centro Integrado de Tecnología Apropiada (CITA)

International Institute for Resource Industries & Sustainability Studies (IRIS)
