= North–South Pipeline =

Australian water pipeline near Melbourne

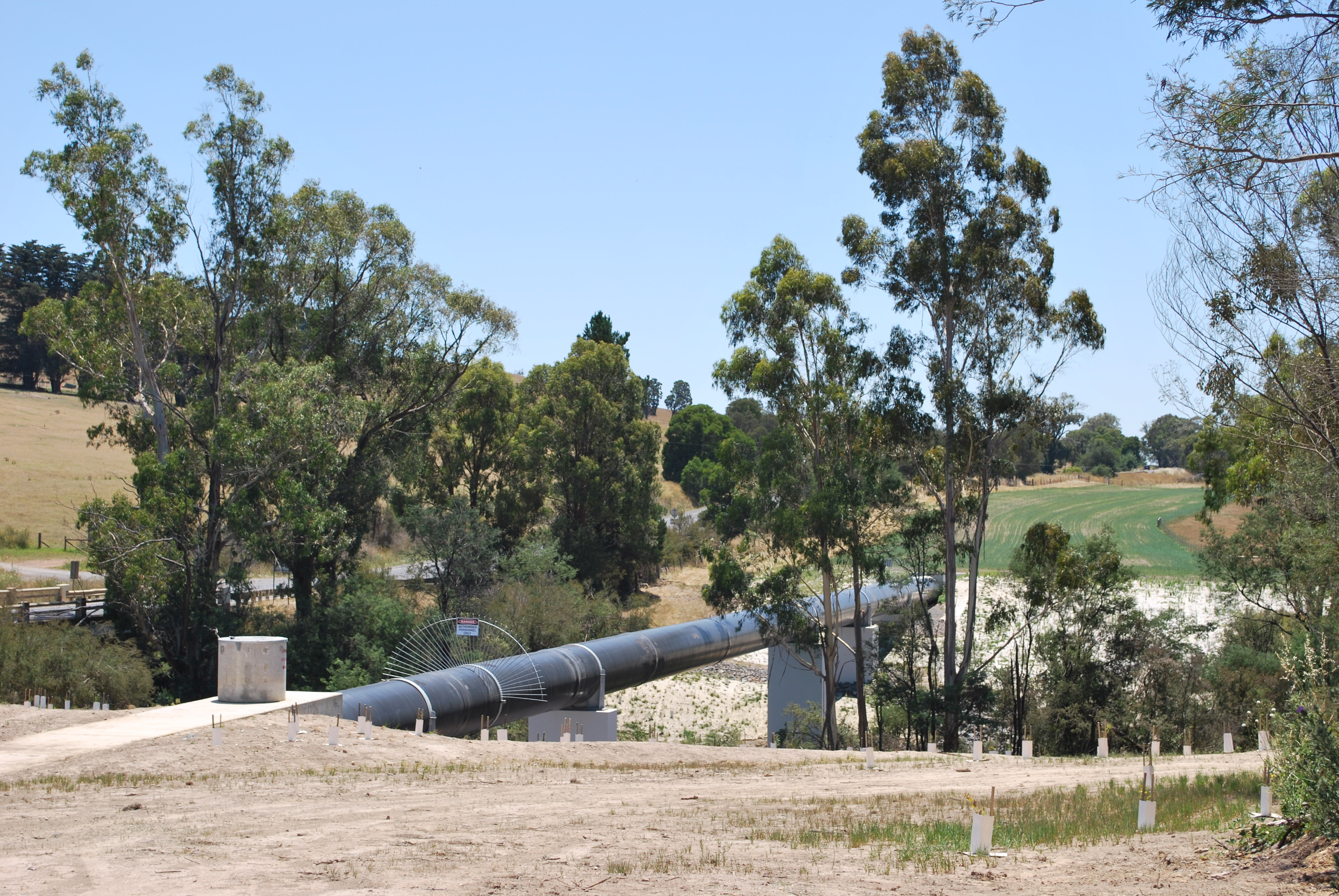
The north–south pipeline crossing the Yea River at Glenburn.

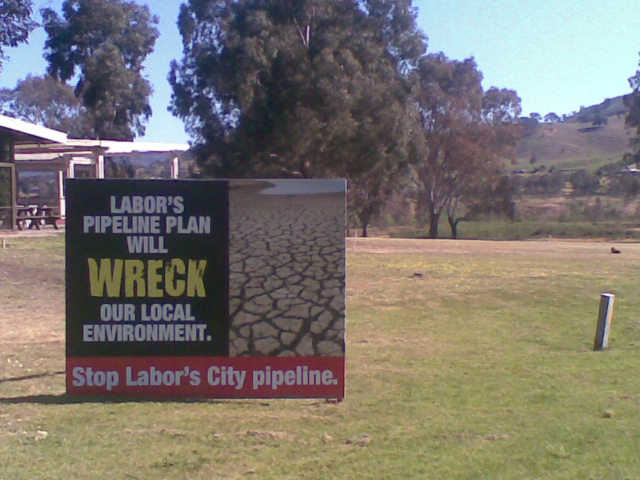
Protest sign about the North South pipeline near Bonnie Doon.

The North–South Pipeline, also known as the Sugarloaf Pipeline, is a water pipeline in Central Victoria, Australia, north-east of Melbourne that is part of Victoria's water system, acting as a link between Melbourne's water grid and the Murray-Goulburn water grid, supplying water via a series of existing and proposed pipelines. The 70-kilometre pipeline was connected to Melbourne in February 2010 to carry water from the Goulburn River to Melbourne's Sugarloaf Reservoir. It is the government's policy that it only be used in times of critical human need: when Melbourne's total water storages are less than 30% full on 30 November of any year. The pipeline can transfer a portion of Lake Eildon's water that is set aside for Melbourne, called the critical water reserve. This was 38,400 megalitres at 2 June 2014, and any changes are based on Goulburn-Murray Water's advice.

The North–South Pipeline was presented through the late 2000s as being part of the Victorian government's "Our Water, Our Future", which included other major projects such as the Wonthaggi Desalination Plant, the Cardinia Pipeline and a proposed interconnector to Geelong.

The pipeline runs between a location on the Goulburn River, near Yea and heads south towards the Sugarloaf Reservoir north-east of Melbourne, along the Melba Highway. The Goulburn River is a major tributary of the Murray-Darling river system and major agricultural region, whilst Sugarloaf Reservoir is a major storage reservoir for Melbourne's water supply. The pipeline cost $750 million and was delivered under an alliance model between Melbourne Water, John Holland, Sinclair Knight Merz and GHD.

The pipeline is expected to add up to 75 billion litres annually to Melbourne's water supply, roughly one third of the 225 gigalitres proposed to be saved by irrigation and modernisation plans and projects in northern Victoria's Murray-Goulburn Irrigation District. The 225 gigalitres in savings is intended to be split 75 to Melbourne, 75 to irrigators and 75 to the watercourses themselves.

== Context ==
In 2007, the Victorian Government announced the "Foodbowl Modernisation Plan" to save 225 gigalitres (GL) of water through a $1 billion investment in the Murray–Goulburn Gravity Irrigation Districts. This was later increased to $2 billion with another 200 GL of savings identified.

The Goulburn is Victoria's largest and longest river, accounting for an average annual flow of 3,040 GL. Of this, about 700 GL is used within the Goulburn-Broken basin, and a further 850 GL transferred to irrigation areas outside the basin. After transmission losses of about 670 GL, a net outflow from the basin to the Murray of 350 GL remains. The population of the basin from this source is given as 100,000. Including Shepparton, Echuca and the tributary Broken catchment- it is estimated at 250,000.

The notion of diverting water out of the Murray Darling Basin to provide urban water supply has stirred emotions among country and city residents. Diverting water between basins is not new however. The Snowy Mountains Scheme diverts Snowy River flows from its own catchment to the Murray Darling Basin in earlier decades. This source supplies 2,100 GL of water for generating power and providing irrigation water. This compares with the 75 GL contested water savings to be diverted out of the Basin for urban use.

Although most people in Victoria live in Melbourne, the city only uses 8% of the regulated surface water, the major portion going to irrigation supply. As of September 2009, Melbourne's water storages were less than 30% full prior to the onset of the drier summer period. This situation had generally worsened over the course of previous twelve years. Inflows into Melbourne's storages over that twelve-year period averaged almost 40% less than the previous long-term average.

As of 2009, consumption in Melbourne was about 450 GL /year. With decreasing inflows to its water catchments and continuing population growth, a shortfall of supply of up to 200 GL / year is anticipated by 2055. A number of strategies have been proposed, including reducing individual consumer demand, recycling "grey" water and sewerage, various means of conservation, and sourcing additional water from elsewhere: including the Goulburn River and Kilcunda desalination plant. The strategy proposes to meet the projected shortfall of demand over existing supply 42% from conservation, and 53% from additional sources.

South-eastern Australia experienced widespread drought at the beginning of the 21st century, which has been linked to human-induced climate change. This has impacted upon rainfall in the region. The amount of water in Melbourne's water storage dams decreased between 1998 and 2009, as a result of those droughts, despite frequent water-usage restrictions.

In June 2007, the Victorian Government released their water plan, Our Water Our Future. As part of this plan, the government announced its intention to develop a seawater reverse osmosis desalination plant and construct a pipeline to augment Melbourne's water supply, as well as other regional supply systems. With the completion of the pipeline and desalination plant, it is anticipated that certain water restrictions will be removed.

== Route ==
The pipeline traverses a distance of approximately 70 km from a location on the Goulburn River, near Yea (37.163793°S 145.423265°E) and heads in a south-southeast direction towards the Sugarloaf Reservoir (37.669436°S 145.307944°E) northeast of Melbourne. The route travels roughly alongside the Melba Highway, southwards, until it splits in its direction towards the reservoir.

The pipeline's route cuts through parts of the Kinglake National Park and Toolangi State Forest.

== Criticism and opposition ==
The North–South Pipeline has been criticised by environmental groups, irrigators and communities directly affected by the pipeline, some suggesting that the project is politically influenced and founded on an incorrect interpretation of available data.

The Federal Opposition, Victorian Liberal Party, the National Party, and the Australian Greens opposed the pipeline, with these objections detailed in the minority (dissenting) report section for the Water Amendment Bill 2008 (Saving the Goulburn and Murray Rivers), which also highlighted the many objections to the pipeline in the majority of submissions to the Senate Inquiry. Groups such as Plug the Pipe, the Victorian Farmers Federation, and Watershed Victoria also opposed the pipeline.

Greenhouse gas emissions over a 100-year life are estimated at 13.3 million tonnes of carbon dioxide equivalent, the vast majority of which is generated by pumping water over the Great Dividing Range. The pipeline operator, Melbourne Water, states that only renewable energy is used for pumping and the system generates its own energy as water from the pipeline enters Sugarloaf Reservoir."". However, the hydro-generator installed at Sugarloaf Reservoir (as at 2024) has never been commissioned due to excessive vibration caused by design deficiencies.

On 20 October 2006 the Victorian Premier released a report "The Central Region Sustainable Water Strategy" in which the government claimed it wasn't viable to take water from the Goulburn Valley to Melbourne. The CSIRO has since released several reports of a similar opinion and has commented on the detrimental effect such a diversion may have on both the environment and the agricultural production.

Victorian Premier, Mr Brumby, has responded to criticisms saying, "Our estimates on the Food Bowl are actually quite conservative … Even in the dry years you've got 690 gigalitres of water lost," he said. "I'm more convinced than ever it's the right project." On 4 January 2010, The Age newspaper published an analysis showing that "Melbourne may never need water from the controversial north–south pipeline, with a stocktake showing existing storages and minimal rainfall should easily supply the city beyond the start of the desalination plant next year."

In the Victorian state election in November 2010 a new government led by the Liberal Party's Ted Baillieu was elected. Baillieu has declared that his government will shut down the pipeline.

=== Statistics withheld ===
Statistics relating to water saved by irrigation upgrades in the Goulburn-Murray district for the year to June 2009 were expected to be released by the State Government by the end of the year (31 December 2009). However, by 1 January 2010, the "Our Water Our Future" website still displayed the message that the savings would be released "before the end of 2009".

As The Age reported; "A spokesman for Water Minister Tim Holding said the audited savings would be released "shortly", but neither he nor the Department of Sustainability and Environment could offer a specific reason for the delay."

== Environmental effects ==
The Federal Government set conditions on construction of the pipeline under the Environmental Protection Biodiversity Conservation (EPBC) Act.

In June, Friends of the Earth (FoE) released its report Out of sight, out of mind?. The group's assessment of the ecological impacts of the North South pipeline claimed that a 12 kilometre long, 30 metre wide corridor cleared through the Toolangi State Forest had affected at least four Special Protection Zones (SPZ).

The Sugarloaf Pipeline Alliance prepared a compliance report on the pipeline which concluded that the known or possible habitats of a number of vulnerable species, including matted flax-lily, the golden sun moth, striped legless lizard, and growling grass frog had been compromised during the construction of the pipeline.

== Project timeline ==
=== 2006 ===
- 20 October – report released by the State Government "The Central Region Sustainable Water Strategy", which suggested it was not viable to take water from the Goulburn Valley to Melbourne.

=== 2007 ===
- The "Foodbowl Modernisation Plan" is announced by the State Government.
- June – the Victorian Government announces their intention to build the North–South Pipeline as part of the Our Water Our Future water plan.

=== 2009 ===
- 31 December – Water savings from the Goulburn-Murray district irrigation upgrades expected to be released are withheld without explanation.

=== 2010 ===
- 10 February – Pipeline is turned on at Sugarloaf Reservoir.
- 7 September – Due to heavy Spring rains, flows through the pipeline were temporarily suspended.
