= Sugarloaf Dam =

Dam and reservoir in Victoria, Australia

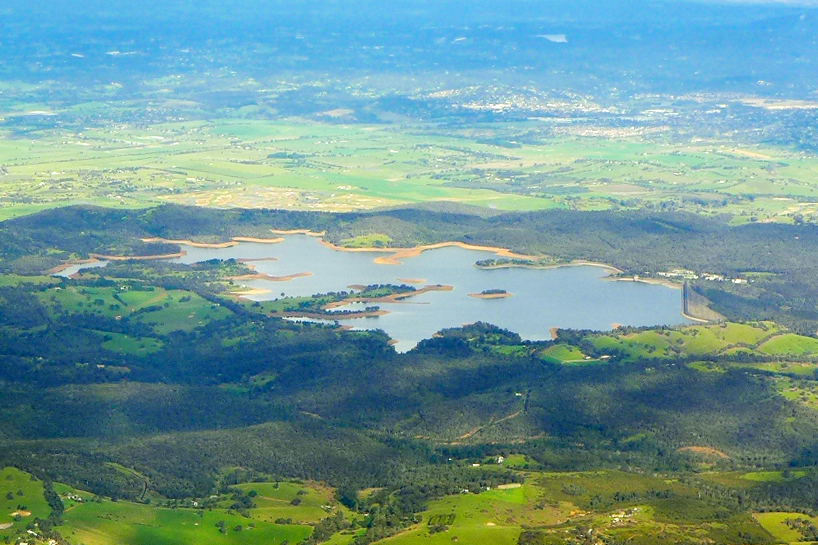
- Aerial view of the reservoir, 2017

- Location of the dam in Victoria
- Interactive map of Sugarloaf Dam
- Country: Australia
- Location: Christmas Hills (near Yarra Glen), Victoria
- Coordinates: 37°40′28″S 145°17′31″E
- Purpose: Water supply
- Status: Operational
- Opening date: 1981
- Built by: Thiess Brothers
- Designed by: Melbourne & Metropolitan Board of Works
- Operator: Melbourne Water

Dam and spillways
- Type of dam: Rock-filled dam; Saddle dam
- Impounds: Sugarloaf Creek
- Height (foundation): 89 m (292 ft)
- Length: 1,050 m (3,440 ft)
- Dam volume: 4,700×10^{3} m^{3} (170×10^{6} cu ft)
- Spillways: 1
- Spillway type: Uncontrolled
- Spillway capacity: 11 m^{3}/s (390 cu ft/s)

Reservoir
- Creates: Sugarloaf Reservoir
- Total capacity: 99,220 ML (80,440 acre⋅ft)
- Active capacity: 96,253 ML (78,034 acre⋅ft)
- Catchment area: 9.15 km^{2} (3.53 sq mi)
- Surface area: 445 ha (1,100 acres)
- Normal elevation: 173 m (568 ft) AHD

Sugarloaf Hydroelectric Power Station
- Commission date: 20 March 1929
- Decommission date: c. 2010
- Type: Mini-hydro
- Installed capacity: 4 MW (5,400 hp)
- Website melbournewater.com.au

The Sugarloaf Dam is a rock-filled embankment dam, with saddle embankments, across the Sugarloaf Creek and a minor tributary, located near Christmas Hills, 35 kilometres (22 mi) north-east of the Melbourne central business district, in Victoria, Australia. Completed in 1981, the resultant eponymous reservoir, the Sugarloaf Reservoir, was established for the supply of potable water to Greater Metropolitan Melbourne. A mini-hydro power station was located at the site, however, it was subsequently decommissioned.

The dam and reservoir are operated by Melbourne Water.

== Dam and reservoir overview ==
=== Dam ===
The dam was completed by Thiess Brothers in 1981. The rock-filled dam wall is 90 metres (300 ft) high and 1,000 metres (3,300 ft) long. When full, the resultant reservoir has a storage capacity of 99,220 megalitres (80,440 acre⋅ft) and covers 445 hectares (1,100 acres), drawn from a catchment area of 9.15 square kilometres (3.53 sq mi). The uncontrolledspillway has a discharge capacity of 11 cubic metres per second (390 cu ft/s). The adjacent rock-filled saddle dam wall is 17 metres (56 ft) high and 528 metres (1,732 ft) long.

Facilities at the complex include a major pumping station and water treatment plant. Water pumped from the Yarra River at Yering Gorge and water transferred from Maroondah Reservoir via the Maroondah aqueduct empty into the Sugarloaf Reservoir, that assist in meeting peak summer demand in the northern parts of Greater Melbourne. In February 2010, the North South Pipeline was completed, connecting the Goulburn River to the reservoir. It is the government's policy that water from the Goulburn only be used in times of critical human need: when Melbourne's total water storages are less than 30% full on 30 November of any year.

=== Reservoir ===
==== Sailing ====
The Sugarloaf Sailing Club operates on the reservoir year round. The club can be found on Ridge Road off the Eltham-Yarra Glen Road. The club runs over 40 races throughout the year in four series, "Winter", "Spring", "Summer" and "Autumn". There is a strong racing fraternity at Sugarloaf who can be found on the lake on race days, rain, hail or shine. New members can use the boats from the club fleet without further charges. The club also conducts sailability on the first Wednesday of the month during the warmer months. Sailability is sailing for all including the young, the elderly and disabled, uses dinghies which are unsinkable, uncapsizable and good fun.

==== Fishing and walks ====
Sugarloaf Reservoir is also a very popular waterway for recreational fishing. Rainbow and brown trout, redfin, roach and European carp can be caught in these waters all year round. No natural bait or berley is permitted, there are signs posted around the reservoir stating this. This is due to the reservoir being an integral component of Melbourne's domestic water supply. There have been studies conducted that suggest that the mercury levels in the redfin (and most likely other predatory fish in the reservoir) are higher than is regarded safe for human consumption.

== Hydroelectric power station ==
The Sugarloaf Hydroelectric Power Station is a decommissioned mini-hydro power station, opened 20 March 1929 by the Premier Sir William McPherson. The capacity of the power station was 4 megawatts (5,400 hp) until it was decommissioned in c. 2010.

== Gallery ==
The former Sugarloaf Power Station and dam at Sugarloaf Reservoir (same location as present-day Lake Eildon)

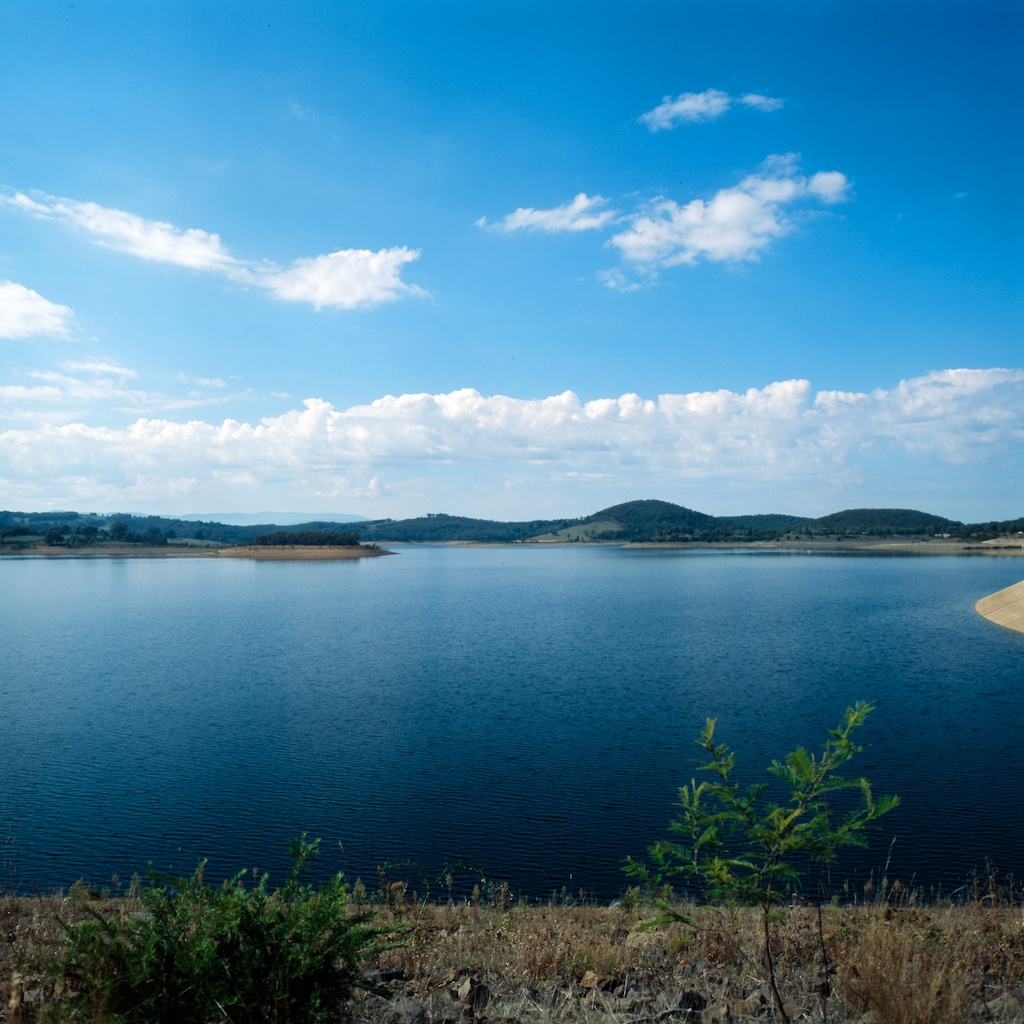
Water levels at 80% capacity in April 2010

== See also ==
- List of reservoirs and dams in Victoria
- List of power stations in Victoria
