= Hamilton Solar Farm =

Solar farm in Queensland, Australia

Coordinates: 20°29′52″S 147°44′09″E

The Hamilton Solar Farm is a solar farm at Collinsville in North Queensland, Australia. The power station can generate 69 megawatts of power. It is owned and operated by Gentari. The site covers 330 hectares. It is co-located with the Whitsunday Solar Farm and the Daydream Solar Farm.

Power from the station is bought by ERM.

== See also ==
- List of solar farms in Queensland
