= Harlin Solar Farm =

- Country: Australia
- Location: Harlin
- Coordinates: 26°56′53″S 152°24′36″E

Solar farm
- Type: Standard PV

Harlin Solar Farm is under construction by Sunshine Energy in the Somerset Region of Queensland, Australia.

It is proposed to build in three stages of 500MW each, and there are plans to add a 500MWh battery storage facility.

Construction began in February 2019. However it almost immediately received complaints from neighbours. A notice of appeal was filed with the Planning and Environment Court. The appeal was dismissed on 18 April 2019.

The company developing the project was in the news in July 2019 over an alleged wrongful transfer of shares, leading to action in the Federal Court of Australia.

The development was again in doubt in late 2019 when Planning consultants Ethos Urban submitted a wind-up application to the New South Wales Supreme Court against Sunshine Energy Australia. The application was dismissed on 1 November 2019.
