= Ross River Solar Farm =

Solar farm in Queensland, Australia

Coordinates: 19°25′27″S 146°42′59″E

The Ross River Solar Farm is a solar farm 20 kilometres (km) south of Townsville in North Queensland, Australia. It is located 1 km from the Ross River Dam. The site has an average of 320 days of sunshine annually.

It has a generating capacity of 116 megawatts. It utilizes 413,280 panels on a single-axis tracking system across 202 hectares. The solar panels were supplied by JA Solar Holdings.

It was jointly developed by ESCO Pacific and Palisade Investment Partners. The power station is expected to have an operating life of up to 40 years. A new 1.2km-long, 132 kV underground transmission line connects the power station to the grid and was laid by Powerlink Queensland.

A power purchase agreement has been signed with EnergyAustralia.

== See also ==
- List of solar farms in Queensland
