= Numurkah Solar Farm =

Solar photovoltaic power station in Numurkah, Victoria, Australia

- Country: Australia
- Location: Numurkah
- Coordinates: 36°09′32″S 145°28′19″E
- Status: Operational
- Commission date: 19 July 2019
- Construction cost: 198 million A$ (2019)
- Owner: HMC Capital

Solar farm
- Type: Standard PV

Power generation
- Nameplate capacity: 112 MW

External links
- Website: numurkahsolarfarm.com.au

Numurkah Solar Farm is a solar photovoltaic power station owned by HMC Capital near the town of Numurkah in the Australian state of Victoria.

At its commissioning in 2019, Numurkah was the largest solar farm in Victoria. It cost A$198 million and generates up to 112MW of AC electricity (installed 128MWp DC). It retains the use of farmland for sheep agistment (Agri-Solar). It can run upward of 1600 sheep over 515 hectares (1,270 acres). Its primary customers are the Melbourne tram network and Laverton steel works under power purchase agreements. The Laverton steel works is a scrap iron recycler owned by the GFG Alliance.
