= Bannerton Solar Park =

Solar power station

- Country: Australia
- Location: Bannerton, Victoria
- Coordinates: 34.69°S 142.78°E
- Status: Operational
- Construction began: October 2017
- Commission date: 2018
- Owner: Foresight Solar Australia

Solar farm
- Type: Flat-panel PV
- Collectors: 319,406
- Site area: 192 hectares (470 acres)

Power generation
- Nameplate capacity: 88 MW

External links
- Website: www.bannertonsolarfarm.com.au

The Bannerton Solar Park is a solar power station in Bannerton south-east of Robinvale in the Sunraysia district of Victoria. It generates up to 88 MW of electricity to the National Electricity Market (NEM).

Bannerton Solar Park was the second solar farm to be funded by the Clean Energy Finance Corporation (after the Gannawarra Solar Farm). It was also funded by Hanwha Energy Australia, parent company of Nectr. It uses 320,000 solar panels to generate 110 MW_{DC}/88 MW_{AC} of electricity. It has offtake agreements with Alinta Energy and Yarra Trams.

UGL designed and built the solar farm, including single axis tracking system, substation and connection to the Powercor Australia grid. It is built on land unsuitable for Almond orchards.

Bannerton is near the edge of the Victorian electricity grid. The solar farm exports electricity at 66 kV into the distribution network to support the local grid in responding to the load imposed from irrigation in summer.
