= Centre for Appropriate Technology (Australia) =

The Centre for Appropriate Technology Inc (CfAT) is an Australian Indigenous-controlled not-for-profit organisation based in Alice Springs, Northern Territory, established in 1980. It aims to improve the lives of Indigenous Australians, using appropriate technology to improve their access to a range services.

There is also a branch office in Cairns, Queensland.

CfAT operated its renewable energy program called Bushlight between 2002 and 2013, under which it installed more than 130 renewable energy systems across remote areas of Northern Territory, Western Australia, and Queensland.
