= Daydream Solar Farm =

- Country: Australia
- Coordinates: 20°29′41″S 147°44′49″E
- Status: Operational
- Commission date: August 2018

Solar farm
- Type: Standard PV
- Solar tracker: Single-axis

Power generation
- Nameplate capacity: 150 MW; 180 MW
- Annual net output: 398,000 MW h

Daydream Solar Farm is a photovoltaic power station developed by Edify Energy in Springlands, Whitsunday Region, Queensland, Australia. It uses a single-axis tracking system to follow the sun across the sky. It generates up to 180MW DC and 150MW AC.

Powerlink upgraded its transmission network to connect the Hayman and Daydream solar farms to the grid.

Daydream has a 12-year power purchase agreement to provide electricity to Origin Energy.

== See also ==
- List of solar farms in Queensland
