= RCR Tomlinson =

Australian engineering company

- Traded as: ASX: RCR
- Industry: Engineering
- Founded: 1898
- Founder: Ernest Tomlinson; Edward Tomlinson
- Headquarters: Sydney, Australia
- Area served: Asia; Australasia
- Key people: Bruce James (CEO); Roderick Brown (Chairman)
- Revenue: $2.0 billion (2017/18)
- Number of employees: 3,500 (November 2018)
- Parent: Perpetual (14%); Pendal Group (9%)
- Website: www.rcrtom.com.au

RCR Tomlinson was one of Australia's largest multi-disciplined infrastructure, resource and engineering companies.

== History ==
In 1898, Tomlinson Bros was founded as an engineering company in Perth by Ernest and Edward Tomlinson. In 1951 the company was floated on the Australian Securities Exchange, (ASX).

In 1981, Clyde Engineering that already held a 63% shareholding, launched a successful takeover bid. In 1985 with a lack of work, Clyde proposed to close the business, however it was rescued in a management buyout. In December 1996 RCR Tomlinson was formed when RCR Engineering and Tomlinson Bros merged.

RCR's origins date back to 1979 when RCR Engineering Ltd was established in Western Australia by Ron Stevens, Clive Butcher and Robert Wovodich (RCR) to provide diversified fabrication and machining services to industry in the south-west region of Western Australia which grew over the next 15 years into the MNLng Technologies business.

== Company Overview ==
RCR Limited grew to become a multi-disciplinary conglomerate engineering company that specialised in the design, manufacture and maintenance of heavy equipment, infrastructure resources, power-generation and industrial boiler systems. The company also delivered site maintenance facilities management, construction and project management services, specialised laser-cutting, heat treatment, fire safety doors, air-conditioning, electrical installation and substation construction.

RCR Tomlinson operated four in service segments and three regions. These include:

- Resources - The company provided specialist structural construction and maintenance services for the resource sector including iron ore, gold nickel, lithium, mineral sands, oil & Gas and LNG sectors. RCR also provided the design manufacture, maintenance and repair of turnkey installations. It operated in WA (Pilbara region), South Australia, New South Wales and Queensland.
- Energy - The company provided combined or Open Cycle power plants, proprietary Heat Recovery Steam Generation technology. A wide variety of Boiler technologies owning Alstom, Tomlinson, Babcock & Wilcox and other boiler licenses. The energy division delivered boilers for a large range of fuels including waste recycle products and waste coffee grounds plus a range of renewable fuels to operate power stations. It operated in Southeast Asia, Australia and New Zealand.
- Infrastructure - The company focused on transport and railway electrical construction and maintenance, water and wastewater, road tunnel construction and project management services.
- Facilities Management and Building Services - The company provided management services (repair and maintenance, cleaning, security, air-conditioning). Brands it operated through were included: RCR O'Donnell Griffin, Haden and Resolve FM.
- New Zealand - RCR New Zealand, operated a multi-services business delivering predominately boiler technology for the dairy and timber industry, electrical services and additionally fire safety doors.
- RCR Asia - RCR operated a multi-service business in Asia delivering predominately boiler technology for power stations and water projects.

RCR Tomlinson engaged in manufacturing of machinery and industrial manufacturing with a focus on: Materials handling - for iron ore, nickel, mineral sands, gold, Lithium. The company also engaged in manufacturing of machinery for transportation of materials such as dumpers, stackers, feeders, conveyors and crushing units.

RCR Boilers delivered Energy servicing and Generation such as Steam boilers, hot water boilers, indirect air heaters, Weishaupt burners, inert gas generators and thermal oil heaters. The company also delivered Electrical Manufacturing of switchboards, SCADA/Automation systems and substations.

RCR Laser and Laser cutting offered machinery such as adaptive laser cutting, fiber laser technology, folding and fabrication, tube processing and fabrication process services.

== Company Growth ==
In 2007, the long-time CEO and Director, John Linden retired and by 2008 the company experienced a decline in shareholder return of -62% in one year and borrowings had risen to $55M, which was equivalent to the prevailing Market Capitalisation.

In 2009, RCR won WA Engineers Australia, Engineering Excellence Award in the Products and Manufacturing category. The company then entered a new phase diversifying from a struggling Resources Sector to include infrastructure projects by acquiring the Austrian Energy business in Australasia and the Construction arm of the Water Corporation (Western Australia) and appointed a CFO, Andrew Walsh.

By 2010 the one-year shareholder return of the company had risen to 36% compared to 2008 of -62%, net debt was halved and profits increased by 25%.

In 2010 Annual Report of the company, notable multi-disciplinary engineering projects were carried out. Among them include Iluka Resources, Jacinth ambrosia, South Australia. RCR designed, manufactured installed and commissioned the second generation fully integrated track-mounted mobile mining unit plant (MUP) as a single module. RCR Provided structural mechanical and piping works for the BHP Worsely Alumina Efficiency and growth project. RCR also provided construction testing and commissioning services for four new gas turbines at the Yarralyi Maya Power station site near Karratha, Western Australia.

In 2011, RCR announced record revenues increasing 600% to $607 Million, EBIT increasing 80%, Net profit after tax increased was up 12% to $19.5million, net debt reduced from $23.1 million to $6.5 million, dividend was up 25% to 3.75 cents.

By 2012 the company had a $45M of cash and no debt had agreed to acquire the Norfolk Group of companies including the prized O'Donnell Griffin electrical Group, Hadens and Resolve Facilities Management. The company had signed a $600 million contract with Fortescue Metals Group to deliver their new Iron Ore projects and returned over 200% for the three year total share-holder return (TSR). The Iron Ore project for Fortescue grew as the company delivered both Kings and Firetail Process plants in record time, delivering $780M dollars of work at completion.

In 2013, RCR completed the Norfolk Group acquisition for $140M dollars adding over $1B to the company's revenue base and in the same year 2013, the CFO, Andrew Walsh retired from the company.

In 2014, RCR Tomlinson RCR become an international multidisciplinary conglomerate with revenues in excess of $1 Billion with over 40 subsidiaries. The company delivered record sales revenue that increased by 49% to $1.3 billion. It also had a record profit and growth delivering a five-year Total Shareholder Return of over 414% and total dividends up 21% in a year.

RCR was awarded $125 million in new contracts in infrastructure. Projects included Legacy Way, Tunnel Works - City of Brisbane.

In 2015, the Order-book of the company was up 30%, dividends up 10%, net debt down 79%. Work included: Novo Rail Alliance, Wynyard Station upgrade, oil and gas service contracts at Gorgan, Pluto, Wheatstone and Curtis Island. The company was awarded Thai Oil in Sriracha, Thailand. The company won maintenance contracts at NRG Gladstone, AGL Torrens Island, New Crest Cadia Panel Cave 2, Rio Tinto Angeles West Deposit B, Rio Tinto Mesa J, Wheatstone heat-treatment off-shore platform, SMP E&I works and equipment supply Roy Hill.

In 2016, RCR Tomlinson exited the Coal industry and continued to diversify into solar projects as renewable energy impacting the Australian Power generation sector. RCR continued to invest in technology and signed the deal for the Australian rights to the innovative Kiruna Wagon Helix unloader. RCR Tomlinson entered the solar generation market, delivering the first solar farm for AGL in Broken Hill. The Broken Hill solar farm went on to successfully deliver record gross margin profits for the company.

By 2017, the order book of the company was 1.4 billion and revenue was 1.3 billion. EBIT for the year was $35.2 million and the company had Preferred Contractor status for a further $1.6 billion of work. The year included winning Darling Downs 110 Mwac Solar Farm, the 159 Mwac Daydream, the 50 Mwac Hayman Solar Farms and Pilbara Minerals Lithium Plant.

RCR was awarded: 125 Mwac Sun Metal Solar Far, Melbourne Underground Rail Loop, Melbourne Water sewerage capital works, 20MW Lignite-Fired Boiler, Mataura Valley Milk New Zealand, 20MW Biomass - firmed boiler, Senipah Power Plant Indonesia, Fortescue, Relocatable Overland Conveyor, Pilbara Minerals Limited, and Pilganoora Lithium, FAM - Stacker / Reclaimer Installation. The Sun Metals solar farm went on to deliver record project gross margin profits for RCR.

== Divestment ==
By the end of Financial year 2018 the company had grown to $2Billion in Revenue and was net cash at June 30, 2018, having paid down all debt facilities.

In late July 2018, cost overruns were discovered on a project. At the time the cost overruns were significant however, the company remained in profit and net cash. The chairman, Roderick Brown, directed RCR into a protracted voluntary suspension for a period of 30 days which had long term ramifications. The company completed a capital raising of $100 million by Macquarie Bank, paying $12.1M in fees, according to the 2018 Annual Report, and the company resumed normal activities. The chairman, Roderick Brown and Directors called in Administrators when the Secured Creditors withdrew support for them on November 21, 2018. In the final report of the Liquidator, it was determined that the protracted Suspension and the loss of confidence in the chairman, Roderick Brown and new CEO, Bruce James “had a significant adverse impact on the group and its ability to successfully tender for new projects”.

According to the Administrator's Report, McGrathNicol oversaw “a sale process that involved more than 300 interested parties on an 'accelerated sale process' timeline, seeking bids with minimal conditionality”. The Administrators admitted failure to sell the business as a whole “Ultimately, each bidder who had initially engaged in the 'whole of business' sale process concluded they would not submit final bids”. This was expected due to the accelerated due diligence process that was unsuitable for sale of such a large complex conglomerate as identified by KPMG in “Navigating Complex M&A”.

== The Sell Off ==
In 2018, RCR Boilers was sold to The Environmental Group Limited.

In the same 2018, RCR Rail was sold to John Holland Group owned by China Communications Construction Company 'snapped up' RCR Rail and absorbed 400 RCR employees.

In 2019, the Chows brothers acquired RCR Tomlinson New Zealand and renamed it RCR Infrastructure Ltd. RCR Energy Services which employed 50 people was sold to The Environmental Group. RCR's Metalbilt/Danks doors business which employed 60 people was sold to New Zealand's ARA Group. Also in 2019, RCR laser was sold to Wangara based business Unique Metals Laser. NRW Holdings also acquired RCR Mining Technologies in 2019.

In March 2019 the boiler projects division RCR Energy New Zealand was sold to Windsor Engineering Group Ltd when it was purchased after the RCR parent company went into voluntary administration and this division was renamed Windsor Energy.
