= Wirsol =

WIRSOL Solar AG
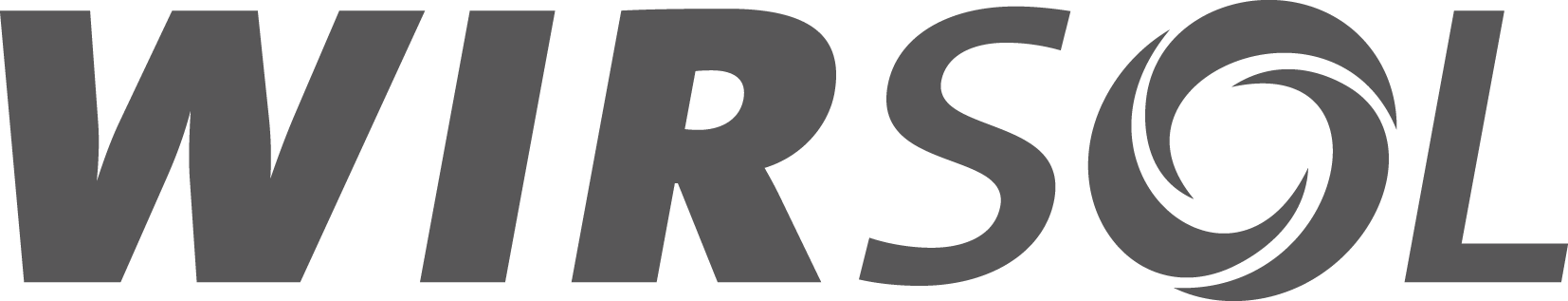
- Company type: Privately held company
- Industry: Renewable energy, photovoltaics, wind power
- Founded: 2003
- Founder: Markus Wirth, Hans Wirth, Stefan Riel
- Defunct: 2014
- Headquarters: Waghäusel, Germany
- Key people: Markus Wirth; Mark Hogan; Nikolaus Krane; Bernd Kästner
- Revenue: €317 million (2011)
- Number of employees: 270 (2012)
- Website: wirsol.com

WIRSOL Solar AG (German pronunciation: [ˈvɪʁzɔl zoˈlaːɐ̯ ʔaːˈɡeː]) is an international solar energy provider, specialized in the planning, financing, construction and maintenance of solar power plants of any size. The headquarters of the company is in Germany. Further company offices are located in Spain, Italy, Great Britain, Belgium, Switzerland, Canada, USA, China, Malaysia and the Maldives.

== History ==
The company was founded in Waghäusel (District of Karlsruhe in Germany) in February 2003 by Markus Wirth, Hans Wirth and Stefan Riel as the "Hausrenovierer GmbH", where the headquarters of the firm are also located. Having specialized in the area of photovoltaics, the firm was renamed "Wirth Solar AG" in January 2004 and from this arose the name "Wirsol Solar AG" in 2007. In the same year, the company opened the Bruhrain solar test park in close proximity to the company premises. A total surface area of 12 hectares made it the biggest solar park in the stare of Baden-Württemberg at the time. With 31,000 modules installed, the plant generates an output of up to 2.258 MWp and provides 500 households with electricity. This corresponds to a yearly CO_{2} saving of around 1300 tons.

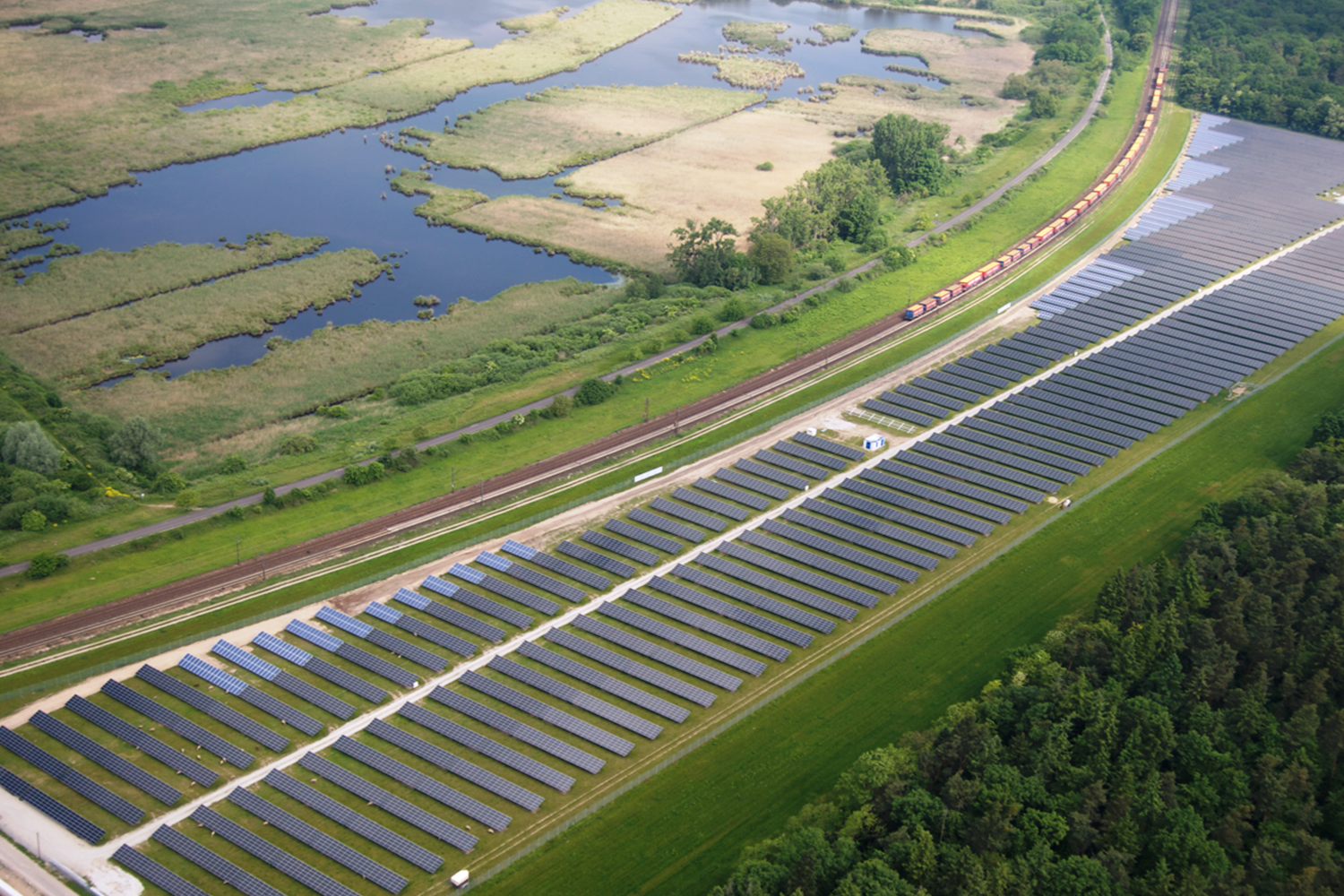
Wirsol solar test park Bruhrain

In 2010, the board of directors was expanded by company founders Markus Wirth and Stefan Riel. Since then, Bernd Kästner has been the chief financial officer. Nikolaus Krane, previously part of the Conergy board, oversees international financial products, large-scale project financing and international marketing and communication. In April 2010, Wirsol installed a photovoltaic system at the German Formula One race track Hockenheimring with a rated output of 848.88 kWp. Along the 405 m-long race tracks, 4716 solar modules were installed.

In 2011, the solar energy company generated a turnover of 317 million Euros. Wirsol finalized one of its largest projects in this financial year in Mixdorf, in Brandenburg. The company built a system with a peak performance of 24.1 MWp on the 81-hectare site of a former Russian fuel depot. Likewise, in 2012, Wirsol connected the high-output Luckau Solar Park (with almost 21 MWp) to the grid on a conversion site in Brandenburg. The solar power plant originated from the former military airport called Alteno. As a result, over 4500 households can be provided with energy.

On a global level, Wirsol is responsible for the installation of over 6200 solar systems with a total output of 440 MWp. Systems in operation reach a total CO_{2} saving of over 180,000 tons per year. So as to further promote good business relations with Asia, Wirsol co-founder Stefan Riel relocated to Beijing as the first top-manager of the German solar sector and created a company location in China with Wirsol Solar Technology Beijing Ltd. In June 2012, Wirsol opened a location in Kuala Lumpur in Malaysia to coordinate activities in Southeast Asia.

Between October 2013 and January 2014, several subsidiaries of the company Wirsol Solar AG initiated insolvency proceedings. Assets including the brand name were acquired by Wircon GmbH (founded by Dietmar Hopp) in March 2014.

In 2014 the WIRSOL Solar AG had to file for insolvency. WIRSOL Energy Australia was founded in 2017 and sold in February 2023. WIRSOL Energy Limited (UK) was founded in 2014 and realised several solar parks.

== International projects ==
In 2012, the company founded the joint venture named "Wirsol RE Maldives" with REM (Renewable Energy Maldives), where solar power stations have already been installed on six of the Maldive islands and where electricity is supplied to schools and hospitals. Further significant international projects have been finalized by Wirsol in Spain (Barcelona, Bovera), Italy (Mola di Bari), Belgium (Schilde), (Jambes) and Colorado (Fort Collins). In 2013, the company announced the start of construction of a solar park on the Japanese island of Honschu and the starting signal for the Monte Plata solar park on the Dominican Republic.

== Sponsoring ==
From 2011/2012 Bundesliga football season, Wirsol Solar AG has been the official sponsor of TSG 1899 Hoffenheim. In Sinsheim, Wirsol gave the Wirsol Rhein-Neckar Arena its name. This is where 1899 Hoffenheim hold their home games. Since the second half of the 2019/20 season, the stadion got a new naming partner. The former Wirsol Rhein-Neckar-Arena is now called PreZero Arena, which is a brand of German Green Cycle GmbH.
