= List of power stations in South Australia =

OpBolivar

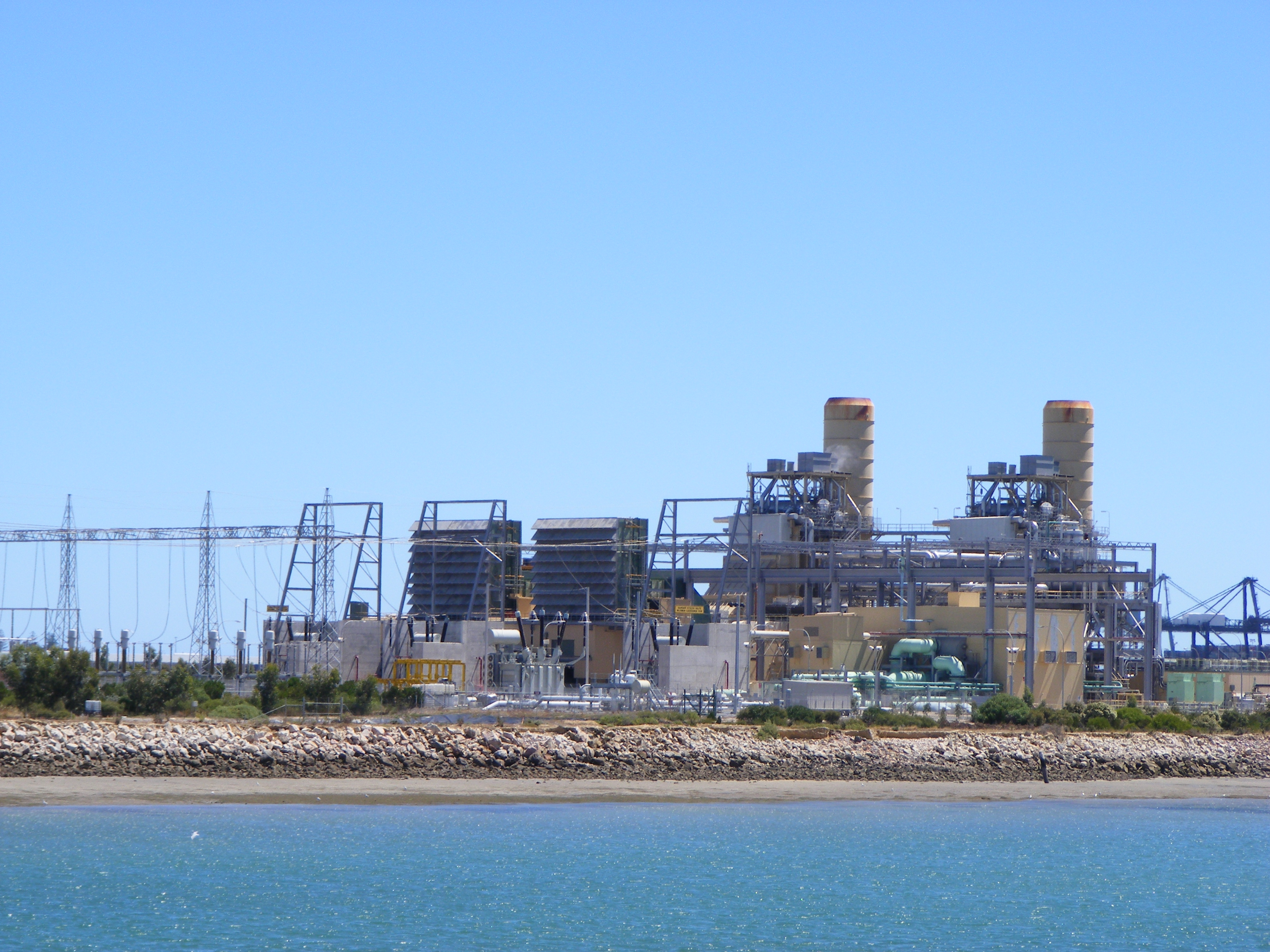
Pelican Point Power Station

This is a list of active power stations in South Australia, Australia. Candidates for this list must already be commissioned and capable of generating 1 MW or more of electricity.

== Coal fired ==
Since 2016, there has been no coal-fired power generation in South Australia. The following fossil fuel power stations previously burned coal to power steam turbines that generate some or all of the electricity they produce.

Playford A ceased generating in 1985. Playford B ceased operation permanently in October 2015, having been out of operation since 2012. Northern ceased operation permanently in May 2016.

== Gas turbine ==
These gas turbine power stations use gas combustion to generate some or all of the electricity they produce.

Power station	Owner/operator	Capacity (MW)	Turbines	Fuel type	Combined cycle
Coopers Brewer (Regency Park)	AGL Energy	4.4	1	natural gas	yes
Dry Creek	Synergen Power	156	3	natural gas	no
Hallett	Energy Australia	180	12	natural gas/diesel	no
Ladbroke Grove	Origin Energy	80	2	natural gas	no
Mintaro	Synergen Power	90	1	natural gas	no
Osborne	50% ATCO, 50% Origin Energy	180	2	natural gas	yes
Port Lincoln	Synergen Power	73.5	3	diesel	no
Quarantine	Origin Energy	224	5	natural gas	no
Pelican Point	Engie	478	3	natural gas	yes
Snapper Point	Nexif	154	5	natural gas	no
Snuggery	Synergen Power	63	3	diesel	no
Whyalla Steelworks	Liberty OneSteel	8.4	2	natural gas	no
Bolivar	SA Government	123	4	natural gas	no

Two "temporary generation" facilities were introduced by the South Australian government before the 2017-18 summer season using General Electric gas turbine generators. They were intended to be used only in extreme circumstances to support the grid following two widespread blackouts in 2016. They were installed at the sites of the former Holden factory in Elizabeth South and the Adelaide Desalination Plant at Lonsdale. In 2022, the former Temporary Generation North turbines were successfully recommissioned at a new location as the Snapper Point Power Station at Outer Harbor.

== Gas (thermal) ==
These power stations use gas combustion to power steam turbines that generate some or all of the electricity they produce.

Power station	Owner/operator	Capacity (MW)	Turbines	Fuel type
Torrens Island	AGL Energy	1,280	8	natural gas
Whyalla Steelworks	Liberty OneSteel	57.5	3	coke ovens and blast furnace gas/oil

== Reciprocating engines ==
These power stations use reciprocating engines to generate some or all of the electricity they produce.

Power station	Owner/operator	Capacity (MW)	Engines	Fuel type
Angaston	Snowy Hydro	50	30	diesel
Barker Inlet	AGL	210	12	natural gas and diesel
Lonsdale	Snowy Hydro	21	18	diesel
Port Stanvac	Snowy Hydro	58	36	diesel
Kangaroo Island power station	SA Power Networks	6	3	diesel
Blue Lake Milling Power Plant	Vibe Energy	1	1	diesel
Tatiara Meats Bordertown	Vibe Energy	1	1	diesel
Pedler Creek Landfill		3	3	landfill gas
Wingfield landfill	Energy Developments	8	8	landfill gas
Bolivar waste water treatment plant	SA Water	9.9	4	sewerage gas

== Hydroelectric ==
These hydroelectric power stations use the flow of water to generate some or all of the electricity they produce.

Power station	Owner/operator	Capacity (MW)	Turbines	Pumped storage
Terminal Storage Mini Hydro	Hydro Tasmania/SA Water	3	1	no

== Wind farms ==
Power station	Owner/operator	Capacity (MW)	Notes
Canunda Wind Farm	Engie/Mitsui	46	
Cathedral Rocks Wind Farm	EnergyAustralia/Acciona	66	
Clements Gap Wind Farm	Pacific Hydro	58	
Goyder South	Neoen	412	late 2025
Hallett Wind Farm - Hallett 1 - Brown Hill	AGL Energy	94.5	
Hallett Wind Farm - Hallett 2 - Hallett Hill	AGL Energy	71.4	
Hallett Wind Farm - Hallett 4 - North Brown Hill	AGL Energy	132	
Hallett Wind Farm - Hallett 5 - The Bluff	AGL Energy	52.5	
Hornsdale Wind Farm	Neoen and Megawatt Capital	315	
Lake Bonney Wind Farm - Stage 1	Infigen	80.5	
Lake Bonney Wind Farm - Stage 2	Infigen	159	
Lake Bonney Wind Farm - Stage 3	Infigen	39	
Mount Millar Wind Farm	Meridian Energy	70	
Snowtown Wind Farm	Trustpower	368.7	Stage I & II
Starfish Hill Wind Farm	RATCH Australia	34.5	
Waterloo Wind Farm	EnergyAustralia	111	
Wattle Point Wind Farm	Infrastructure Capital	90.75	
Lincoln Gap Wind Farm	Lincoln Gap Wind Farm	212	Stage 1 (126 MW) complete
Willogoleche Wind Farm	Engie	119	

== Solar ==
Project name	Coordinates	Capacity (MW)	Technology	Status	Sponsoring company	Notes
Bungala Solar Power Farm	32.42°S 137.84°E	220	PV	Operating	Enel Green Power	
Tailem Bend Solar Power Farm	35.28°S 139.49°E	108	PV	Operating	Vena Energy	Limited to 95 MW to provide reactive power to the grid. Vena Energy are also planning a second stage of up to 100 MW (AC).
Port Augusta Renewable Energy Park		99	PV	Operating	Iberdrola	Hybrid facility, 207 MW wind, 99 MW solar
Aurora Solar Thermal Power Project	32.2°S 137.6°E	150	CSP	Cancelled	SolarReserve	Cancelled in 2019
Cultana Solar Farm	32°54′S 137°36′E	280	Single axis tracking PV	Cancelled	SIMEC Energy Australia	
Bungama Solar	33.19°S 138.09°E	280	PV	Development approved	EPS Energy	EPS Energy are also planning on pairing it with a 140 MW/560 MWh battery energy storage system.
Bridle Track Solar Project		300	PV	Announced	Rise Renewables	
Pallamana Solar Farm		176	PV	Development approval	RES Australia	RES Australia are also planning on pairing it with a battery storage facility.
Snowtown North Solar Farm		45	PV	Announced	Tilt Renewables	Tilt Renewables notes it has "potential battery storage of up to 25 MW".
Solar River Project Stage 1		200	PV	Announced	The Solar River Project	
Solar River Project Stage 2		200	PV	Announced	The Solar River Project	
Sundrop Farms	32°32′51.4″S 137°50′48.1″E	39	CSP	Operational	Sundrop Farms	
Whyalla Solar Project		160	PV	Announced	Adani Australia	
Chaff Mill Solar Farm	33.89°S 138.76°E	100	PV	Announced	Fotowatio Renewable Ventures	

== Battery storage ==
Power station	Owner/operator	Capacity (MW)	Storage (MWh)	Units	Energised	Fuel type
Blyth	Neoen	238	477		2025	Goyder South Wind Farm
Torrens Island	AGL	250	250		2023	State power grid
Mannum	AGL	100	200		2025	
Hornsdale Power Reserve	Neoen	150 (100 before upgrade)	193 (129 before upgrade)	197	2017	Wind
Lake Bonney Wind Farm	Infigen Energy	25	52		2019	Wind
Dalrymple ESCRI battery	ElectraNet/AGL Energy	30	8		2019	Wattle Point Wind Farm
	under construction :					
Limestone Coast North		250	500			
Bungama		150	300		2027	339 MW solar
Templers		111	291		2025	
Summerfield		240	960		2027	
Clements Gap		60	130		2026	55 MW wind

== See also ==
- List of power stations in Australia
- Electricity Trust of South Australia
- Wind power in South Australia
