= List of wind farms in Australia =

This is a list of wind farms in Australia, with a generating capacity of more than 50 MW, which are operating, under construction, or for which planning approval has been received.

== Operating ==
Large operational wind farms in Australia
Wind farm	Installed capacity (MW)	Owner	Turbine make	State	Coordinates
Ararat Wind Farm	242.5	Partners Group, OPTrust	GE	Victoria	37°13′58″S 143°01′53″E
Bald Hills Wind Farm	107	Mitsui	Senvion	Victoria	38.789°S 145.926°E
Boco Rock Wind Farm	113	Squadron Energy	GE	New South Wales	36°34′43″S 149°6′12″E
Bodangora Wind Farm	113	Iberdrola Australia	GE	New South Wales	32.39°S 149.06°E
Bulgana Wind Farm	194	Neoen	SGRE	Victoria	37°13′58″S 143°01′53″E
Capital Wind Farm	140	Iberdrola Australia	Suzlon	New South Wales	35°10′S 149°31′E
Cathedral Rocks Wind Farm	66	EnergyAustralia and Acciona	Vestas	South Australia	34°51′S 135°35′E
Cattle Hill Wind Farm	144	Power China	Goldwind	Tasmania	42.151°S 146.688°E
Challicum Hills Wind Farm	52.5	Pacific Blue	NEG	Victoria	37.38°S 143.11°E
Clements Gap Wind Farm	57	Pacific Blue	Suzlon	South Australia	33.4809°S 138.0987°E
Collector Wind Farm	226.8	RATCH-Australia	RATCH-Australia	New South Wales	34.87°S 149.39°E
Collgar Wind Farm	222	Rest Super	Vestas	Western Australia	31°32′35″S 118°27′17″E
Coopers Gap Wind Farm	453	Tilt Renewables	GE	Queensland	26.55°S 151.33°E
Crowlands Wind Farm	80	Pacific Blue	Senvion	Victoria	37.1269°S 143.1557°E
Dulacca Wind Farm	180	RES	Vestas	Queensland	26.63°S 149.87°E
Emu Downs Wind Farm	80	APA Group	Vestas	Western Australia	30°30′S 115°20′E
Granville Harbour Wind Farm	112	Palisade Investment Partners	Vestas	Tasmania	41.802°S 145.056°E
Gullen Range Wind Farm	165.5	Goldwind Australia/JNCEC	Goldwind	New South Wales	34°33′38″S 149°25′19″E
Hallett Group	351	AGL Energy	Suzlon	South Australia	33°22′4″S 138°43′43″E
Hornsdale Wind Farm	315	Neoen and Megawatt Capital	Siemens	South Australia	33°03′02″S 138°32′37″E
Kaban Wind Farm	157	Neoen	Vestas	Queensland	17.56°S 145.41°E
Lake Bonney Group	278	Infigen Energy	Vestas	South Australia	37°45′36″S 140°24′0″E
Lal Lal Wind Farm	220	Northleaf Capital Partners, InfraRed Capital & Macquarie Capital	Vestas	Victoria	37.6486°S 143.8843°E
Lincoln Gap Wind Farm	212	Nexif Energy Australia	Senvion	South Australia	32.55°S 137.63°E
Macarthur Wind Farm	420	AGL Energy	Vestas	Victoria	38°2′23″S 142°1′30″E
Moorabool Wind Farm (North & South)	321	Goldwind Australia	Goldwind	Victoria	37.6729°S 144.1584°E
Mount Emerald Wind Farm	180.5	RATCH-Australia	Vestas	Queensland	17.2°S 145.4°E
Mount Gellibrand Wind Farm	132	Acciona	Acciona	Victoria	38.230°S 143.765°E
Mount Mercer Wind Farm	131	Foresight Group	Senvion	Victoria	37°50′28″S 143°52′16″E
Mount Millar Wind Farm	70	Foresight Group	Enercon	South Australia	33°37′57″S 136°41′6″E
Mumbida Wind Farm	55	Synergy and Foresight Group	GE	Western Australia	28.992°S 114.959°E
Murra Warra Wind Farm	226	Partners Group	Senvion	Victoria	36.4280°S 142.3171°E
Murra Warra II Wind Farm	209	Partners Group	GE	Victoria	36.4280°S 142.3171°E
Musselroe Wind Farm	168	Hydro Tasmania	Vestas	Tasmania	40°46′48″S 147°59′4″E
Oaklands Hill Wind Farm	63	AGL Energy	Suzlon	Victoria	37°41′16″S 142°33′10″E
Portland Wind Farm	195	Pacific Blue	Senvion	Victoria	38°21′8.74″S 141°35′14.4″E
Sapphire Wind Farm	270	CWP Renewables	Vestas	New South Wales	29.781°S 151.574°E
Silverton Wind Farm	199	Tilt Renewables	GE	New South Wales	31.794°S 141.258°E
Snowtown Group	369	Tilt Renewables	Suzlon	South Australia	33°49′48″S 138°7′7″E
Stockyard Hill Wind Farm	530	Goldwind Australia	Goldwind	Victoria	37°32′9″S 143°15′5″E
Taralga Wind Farm	106.8	State Power Investment Corporation	Vestas	New South Wales	34°25′16″S 149°51′50″E
Walkaway Wind Farm	90	Infigen Energy	Vestas	Western Australia	28°53′53″S 114°52′7″E
Waterloo Wind Farm	111	Roaring 40s	Vestas	South Australia	34°0′6″S 138°54′51″E
Wattle Point Wind Farm	91	AGL Energy	Vestas	South Australia	35°07′21″S 137°42′55″E
Waubra Wind Farm	192	Acciona Energy & ANZ Infrastructure Services	Acciona	Victoria	37°19′32″S 143°36′32″E
White Rock Wind Farm (Stage I)	175	Goldwind Australia	Goldwind	New South Wales	29.812°S 151.548°E
Willogoleche Wind Farm	119	Engie	GE	South Australia	33.393°S 138.848°E
Woolnorth Wind Farm	140	Roaring 40s & Hydro Tasmania	Vestas	Tasmania	40°41′06″S 144°43′01″E

== Under construction ==
Large wind farms approved and under construction:

Wind farm	Installed capacity (MW)	Developer	Turbine make	State	Coordinates	Expected completion
Golden Plains Wind Farm	1330	Westwind Energy	Vestas	Victoria		2027
Goyder South 1A	209	Neoen	GE Vernova	South Australia		2024
Goyder South 1B	203	Neoen	GE Vernova	South Australia		2025
MacIntyre Herries Range Wind Farm	2023	Acciona & Clean Co	Nordex Group	Queensland	28.3399°S 151.5073°E	2025
Rye Park Wind Farm	396	Tilt Renewables	Vestas	New South Wales		2024

== See also ==
- List of proposed wind farms in Australia
- List of onshore wind farms
- List of wind farms in New South Wales
- List of wind farms in Queensland
- List of wind farms in South Australia
- List of wind farms in Tasmania
- List of wind farms in Victoria
- List of wind farms in Western Australia
- Wind power in Australia
- Wind power in South Australia
