= List of wind farms in South Australia =

Map

This is a list of wind farms in South Australia. As of 2022, South Australia has 16 operating wind farms with a total installed capacity of about 2,139 MW. Prior to 2003, a 150 kW unit at Coober Pedy was the only large wind turbine in South Australia.

== Table ==
Project name	Sponsoring company	Coordinates	Capacity (MW)	Status	Notes
Canunda Wind Farm	Engie/Mitsui	37.697°S 140.379°E	46	Operating	
Cathedral Rocks Wind Farm	EnergyAustralia/Acciona	34.76°S 135.54°E	66	Operating	
Clements Gap Wind Farm	Pacific Hydro	33.500°S 138.100°E	56.7	Operating	Opened February 2010
Goyder Renewables Zone	Neoen	33.7°S 139.0°E	412.5	Operating	Goyder South development application released August 2020 Goyder South application approved in May 2021. Early works began in December 2021. Stage 1 (412.5 MW) operating in late 2025.
Hallett Wind Farm	AGL Energy	33.395°S 138.840°E	350.7	Operating	Hallett 1 (94.5 MW), Hallett 2 (71.4 MW), Hallett 4 (132.3 MW), Hallett 5 (52.5 MW). Hallett 3 (95 MW) was cancelled.
Hornsdale Wind Farm	Neoen and Megawatt Capital	33.058°S 138.544°E	316.8	Operating	Stage 1 (102.4 MW), 2 (102.4 MW) and 3 (112 MW).
Lake Bonney Wind Farm	Infigen	37.76°S 140.4°E	278.5	Operating	Stage 1 (80.5 MW), 2 (159 MW) and 3 (39 MW).
Lincoln Gap Wind Farm	Nexif Energy	32.619°S 137.580°E	212.4	Operating	59 3.6MW turbines. Stage 1 (35 turbines - 126 MW) Completed. Stage 2 (24 turbines - 86.4 MW) completed in 2022.
Mount Millar Wind Farm (Yabmana)	Meridian Energy	33.70°S 136.74°E	70	Operating	
Port Augusta Renewable Energy Park	Iberdrola	32°34′01″S 137°51′22″E	210	Operating	Hybrid facility, 210 MW wind, 107 MW solar
Snowtown Wind Farm	Tilt Renewables	33.69°S 138.13°E	368.7	Operating	Stage I & II
Starfish Hill Wind Farm	RATCH-Australia	35.584°S 138.137°E	33	Operating	
Waterloo Wind Farm	EnergyAustralia	34.000°S 138.900°E	130.8	Operating	Originally built as 111 MW (2010), upgraded to 130.8 MW (2016).
Wattle Point Wind Farm	Infrastructure Capital	35.095°S 137.729°E	90.75	Operating	
Willogoleche Wind Farm	Engie	33.393°S 138.848°E	119	Operating	Operating as of 2019.
Keyneton	Pacific Hydro	34.57°S 139.22°E	105	Cancelled	Development was required to have commenced by 29 November 2019 and completed by 29 November 2021. Expected to produce 325GWh/year.Pacific Hydro cancelled the project in October 2019 when it could not receive a time extension.
Elliston Stages 1, 2 and 3 (Tungketta Hill)	Ausker Energies & ANZ Infra Services	33.650°S 134.890°E	200	Planning approval lapsed, new proposal in progress	
Green Point	Wind Prospect	38.00°S 140.84°E	44	Cancelled	Cancelled 2013
Carmody's Hill	Pacific Hydro	33.37°S 138.48°E	175	Possibly cancelled	Planning approval lapsed in 2013
Myponga Wind Farm	TrustPower	35.400°S 138.455°E	35	Cancelled	
Vincent North (Sheaoak Flat)	Pacific Hydro	34.7°S 137.8°E	59	Cancelled	Planning approved in 2004 extended for two more years in 2008 Planning approval lapsed 2010
Troubridge Point (also known as Wattle Point stage 2)	Origin Energy	35.16°S 137.67°E	30	Cancelled	Wind Prospect sold to Origin Energy in 2004, seems to have lapsed by 2008.
Ceres	Spark Renewables	34.58°S 137.77°E	600	Proposed	Acquired in May 2022
Kemmiss Hill	Origin Energy	35.58°S 138.16°E	30	Cancelled	Refused planning consent
Waitpinga	Waitpinga Wind Farm Pty. Ltd.	35.595°S 138.505°E	50	Cancelled	Application rejected 2005
Woakwine	Beacon Energy	37.375°S 140.030°E	400	Possibly cancelled	
Barn Hill (Red Hill)	RATCH-Australia	33.575°S 138.060°E	120	Possibly cancelled	Not present on website as of September 2021.
Kongorong	RATCH-Australia	37.900°S 140.565°E	30	Possibly cancelled	Listed as another development of RATCH-Australia in October 2016, no longer appears on website as of September 2021.
Kulpara	RATCH-Australia		100	Possibly cancelled	Listed as another development of RATCH-Australia in October 2016, no longer appears on website as of September 2021.
Palmer	Tilt Renewables	34.81°S 139.13°E	300	Development approved	Final appeal against development approval overturned November 2019. Still progressing as of April 2021.
Twin Creek Wind Farm	RES Australia	34.30°S 139.05°E	183	Development approval	

== See also ==
- List of power stations in South Australia
- Wind power in South Australia
