= Wind power in South Australia =

South Australian use of wind turbines to generate electricity

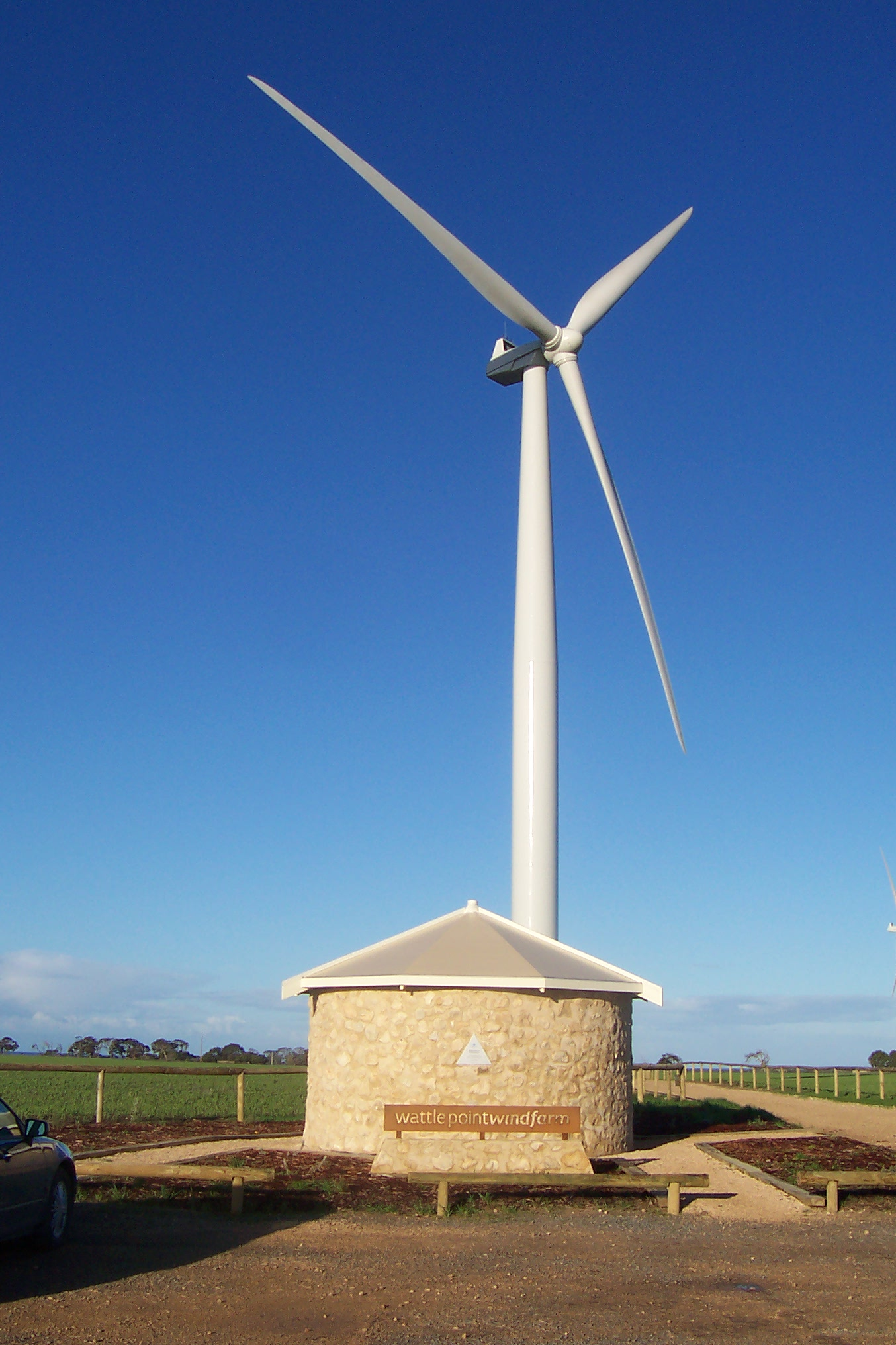
The information centre near the base of one of the towers at Wattle Point Wind Farm

Wind power became a significant energy source within South Australia over the first two decades of the 21st century. In 2015, there was an installed capacity of 1,475 MW, which accounted for 34% of electricity production in the state. This accounted for 35% of Australia's installed wind power capacity. In 2021, there was an installed capacity of 2052.95 MW, which accounted for 42.1% of the electricity production in the state in 2020.

The development of wind power capacity in South Australia has been encouraged by a number of factors. These include the Australian Government's Renewable Energy Target, which requires electricity retailers to source a proportion of energy from renewable sources, incentives from the South Australian Government including a supportive regulatory regime and a payroll tax rebate scheme for large scale renewable energy developments. Also, the state's proximity to the Roaring forties means there are high-quality wind resources for wind farms to exploit. In mid-2009, RenewablesSA was established by the South Australian Government to encourage further investment in renewable energy in the state.

The load factor (or capacity factor) for South Australian wind farms is usually in the range of 32–38%. This means that a wind farm could typically produce between 32 and 38% of its nameplate capacity averaged over a year.

== Wind farm overview ==
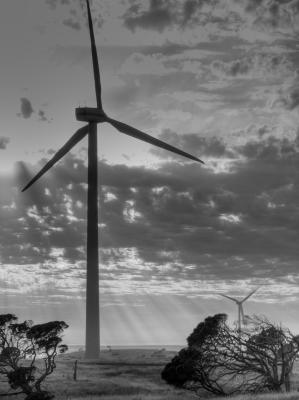
Early morning at Lake Bonney Wind Farm

In 2003 the only large wind turbine in South Australia was a 0.15 MW unit at Coober Pedy and by early 2004 there was 34 MW of installed wind power capacity.

As of December 2010, South Australia had thirteen operational wind farms, with an installed capacity of 1,018 MW. By August 2014 this had increased to 1,473 MW, accounting for 27 per cent of electricity production. As of late 2015 there are a large range of new wind farms in various stages of planning but only one under construction, the Hornsdale Wind Farm. Hornsdale is a place that was generating 86 MW immediately prior to the 2016 South Australian blackout in September 2016.

South Australia has provided regulatory certainty for wind farms, and the government has implemented land use planning policies which represent national best practice for accommodating wind farms. On 2 June 2009, Premier Mike Rann announced plans to increase South Australia's renewable energy production target to 33% by 2020, well above the national target of 20% by 2020.

Operational wind farms in South Australia: July 2021
Installed capacity (MW)	Wind farm	Owner	Stage	Installed capacity (MW)	Generating since...
368.7	Snowtown wind farm	Tilt Renewables Palisade Investment Partners	1	98.7	September 2008
368.7	Snowtown wind farm	Tilt Renewables Palisade Investment Partners	2	270	October 2014
350.7	Hallett Wind Farm	AGL Energy	1	94.5	March 2007
350.7	Hallett Wind Farm	AGL Energy	2	71.4	September 2009
350.7	Hallett Wind Farm	AGL Energy	4	132.3	August 2010
350.7	Hallett Wind Farm	AGL Energy	5	52.5	July 2011
316.8	Hornsdale Wind Farm	Neoen	1	102.4	June 2016
316.8	Hornsdale Wind Farm	Neoen	2	102.4	February 2017
316.8	Hornsdale Wind Farm	Neoen	3	112	August 2017
278.5	Lake Bonney Wind Farm	Infigen Energy	1	80.5	March 2005
278.5	Lake Bonney Wind Farm	Infigen Energy	2	159	April 2008
278.5	Lake Bonney Wind Farm	Infigen Energy	3	39	September 2009
130.8	Waterloo Wind Farm	Palisade Investment Partners Northleaf Capital	1	111	November 2010
130.8	Waterloo Wind Farm	Palisade Investment Partners Northleaf Capital	2	19.8	November 2016
126	Lincoln Gap Wind Farm	Nexif Energy	1	126	April 2019
126	Lincoln Gap Wind Farm	Nexif Energy	2	86	
119	Willogoleche Wind Farm	Engie	-	119	August 2018
90.75	Wattle Point Wind Farm	AGL Energy	-	90.75	April 2005
70	Mount Millar Wind Farm	Meridian Energy	-	70	February 2006
66	Cathedral Rocks Wind Farm	EnergyAustralia/ Acciona	-	66	September 2005
56.7	Clements Gap Wind Farm	Pacific Hydro	-	56.7	February 2010
46	Canunda Wind Farm	Engie/Mitsui	-	46	March 2005
33	Starfish Hill Wind Farm	RATCH-Australia	-	33	September 2003

== Operational wind farms ==
=== Snowtown Wind Farm (369 MW) ===
It is located on the Barunga Range of hills west of Snowtown in the mid-North of South Australia and around 150 km north of the state capital, Adelaide. The first stage of the Snowtown wind farm with a capacity of 98.7 MW was completed in 2008. The 270 MW second stage was completed in November 2014.

=== Hallett Wind Farm (350 MW) ===
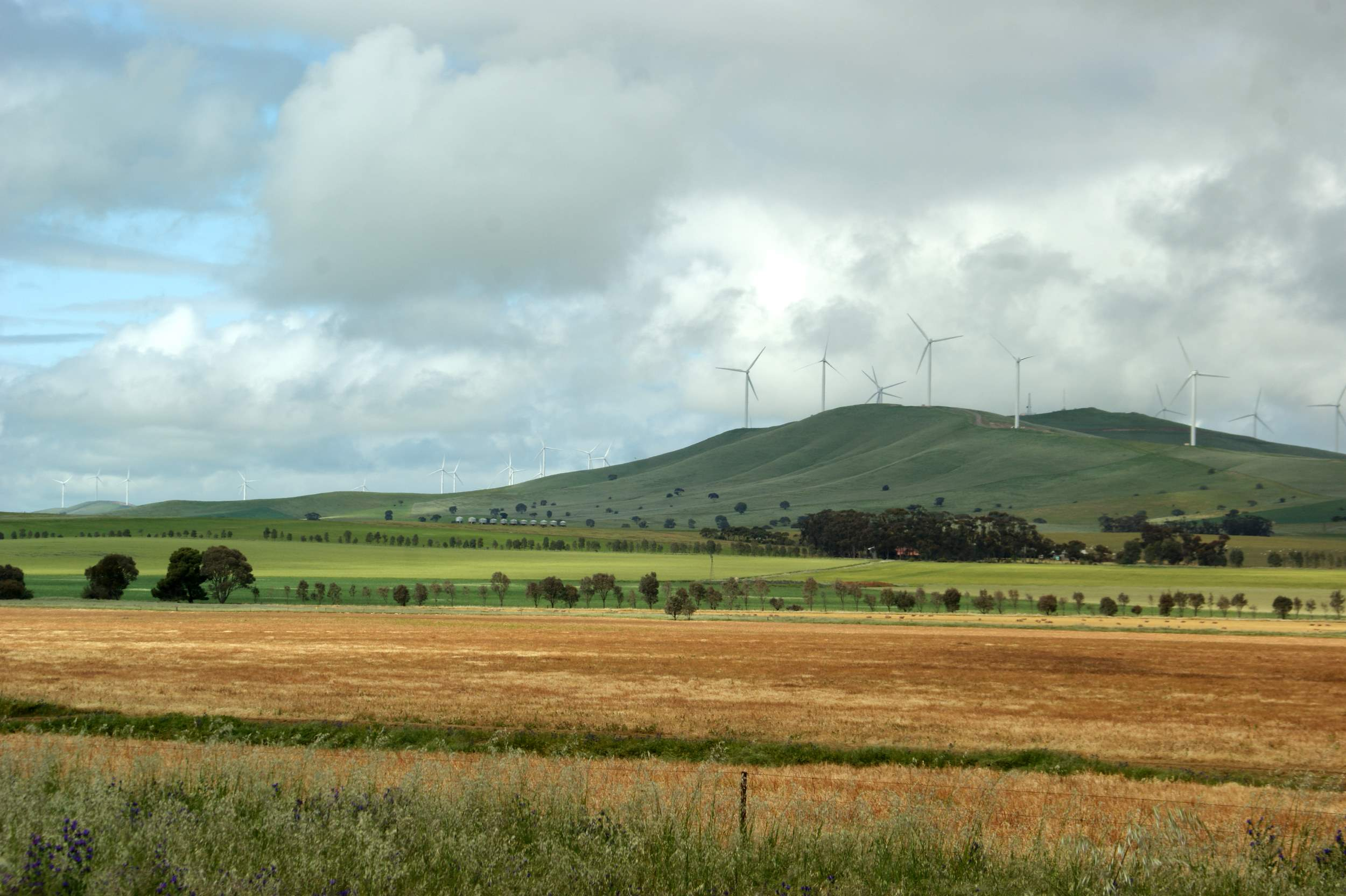
Hallett Wind Farm

Hallett Wind Farm was developed in four stages: Hallett 1 (also known as Brown Hill Wind Farm), Hallett 2 (Hallett Hill), Hallett 4 (North Brown Hill) and Hallett 5 (Bluff Range). The proposed Hallett 3 (Mt Bryan) wind farm was put on hold by AGL in 2012.

Hallett 1 consists of 45 Suzlon 2.1 MW S88 turbines (95 MW in total) and was completed in June 2008. Hallett 2 consists of 34 2.1 MW Suzlon turbines (71.4 MW in total) and was completed in late 2009. Hallett 4 has 63 turbines with a total installed capacity of 132 MW, and was in full operation in early 2011. Hallett 5 consists of 25 Suzlon turbines each of 2.1 MW and was completed in early 2012.

=== Hornsdale Wind Farm (315 MW) ===
Hornsdale Wind Farm was built in three stages. Construction of Stage 1 began in September 2015 and was finished in September 2017. Stage 1 consists of 32 turbines each having a rated capacity of 3.2 MW (total 102.4 MW). Construction of Stage 2 began in July 2016 and was finished in June 2017. Stage 2 consists of 32 turbines each having a rated capacity of 3.2 MW (total 102.4 MW). Construction of Stage 3 began in April 2017 and was finished in December 2017. Stage 3 consists of 35 turbines each having a rated capacity of 3.2 MW (total 112 MW).

=== Lake Bonney Wind Farm (278.5 MW) ===
Lake Bonney Wind Farm was built in three stages. Stage 1 consists of 46 turbines each having a rated capacity of 1.75 MW (total 80.5 MW) and was finished in March 2005. Construction of Stage 2 began in November 2006 and was finished around April 2008. Stage 2 consists of 53 turbines of 3 MW (total 159 MW). Stage 3 consists of 13 turbines of 3 MW (total 39 MW). The combined capacity of the three stages is 278.5 MW making it the biggest wind farm in Australia at the time of completion.

=== Lincoln Gap (212 MW) ===
Lincoln Gap Wind Farm is built on the hills above Lincoln Gap, a gap in the range where the Eyre Highway and Whyalla railway line pass through.

=== Waterloo Wind Farm (131 MW) ===
The Waterloo Wind Farm was built as a 111 MW wind farm which was completed in 2010 at an estimated cost of $300 million. It had thirty-seven Vestas V90 3 MW turbines along the 18 km wind farm site connected through a 33 kilovolt (kV) internal reticulation network to the wind farm substation. The wind farm is approximately 30 kilometres south-east of the township of Clare and 100 km north of Adelaide. A Stage 2 expansion was approved to add up to an additional 6 turbines to the existing farm and increase its total generating capacity to over 130 MW. The wind farm was expanded with six additional Vestas V117 turbines at the southern end in 2016 at a cost of A$43 million.

=== Willogoleche Wind Farm (119 MW) ===
Willogoleche Wind Farm is in the Mid North of South Australia, just west of the town of Hallett.

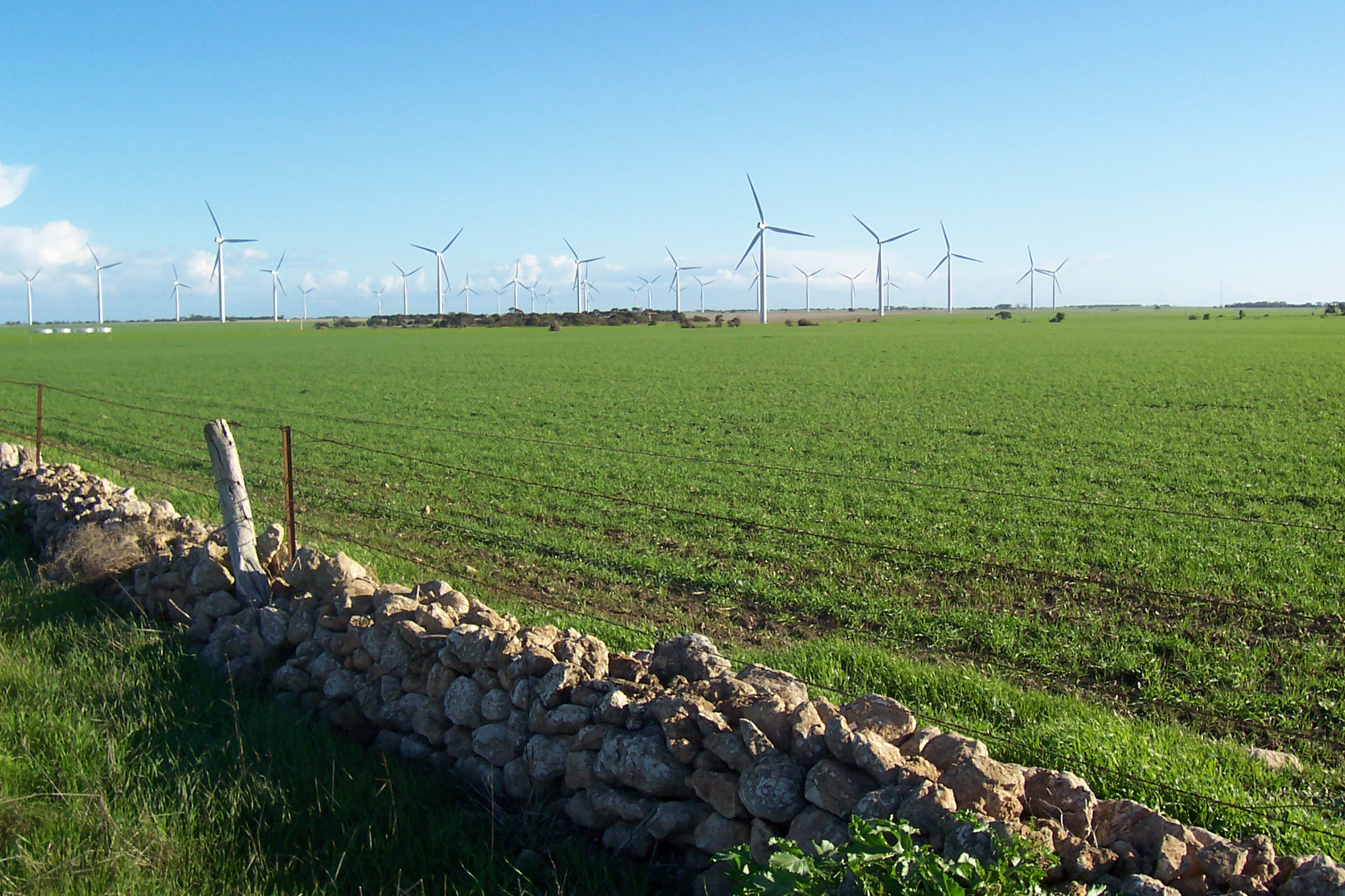
Wattle Point wind farm near Edithburgh, South Australia.

=== Wattle Point Wind Farm (91 MW) ===
Wattle Point Wind Farm is near Edithburgh on the Yorke Peninsula. When it was officially opened in June 2005 it was Australia's largest wind farm at 91 MW. The installation consists of 55 wind turbines and was built at a cost of 165 million Australian dollars.

=== Mount Millar Wind Farm (70 MW) ===
Mount Millar Wind Farm is situated on an escarpment between the towns of Cowell and Cleve located 100 kilometres southwest of Whyalla. The 35 wind turbines are positioned on the elongated Mount Millar site (about 7 kilometres in length) to maximise wind exposure and can generate up to 70 megawatts of electricity. Construction of this wind farm started in late 2004 and was completed in December 2005. Power production started in February 2006.

=== Cathedral Rocks Wind Farm (66 MW) ===
Cathedral Rocks Wind Farm is in a remote coastal area located near the southern tip of the Eyre Peninsula in South Australia, about 30 km south west of Port Lincoln. It has 33 wind turbines capable of generating 66 MW in total. Construction started in 2004, and the first turbines were commissioned in late 2005. The wind farm was fully operational by 2007.

=== Clements Gap Wind Farm (56 MW) ===
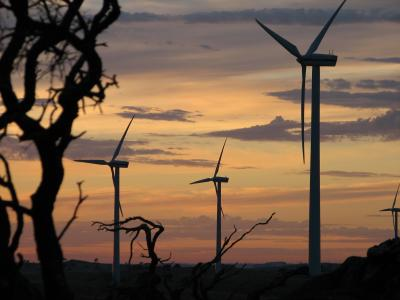
Canunda wind farm at sunrise

In February 2010, Pacific Hydro opened the 56.7 MW Clements Gap Wind Farm. The wind farm is located in South Australia's mid-north. The project has 27 x 2.1 MW Suzlon wind turbines, which generate enough electricity for 30,000 homes.

=== Canunda Wind Farm (46 MW) ===
Canunda Wind Farm is a $92.5 million, 46 MW wind power project located on grazing land approximately 16 kilometres south of Millicent. The wind farm is made up of 23 Vestas 2.0 MW wind turbines. The project was opened in March 2005 by Wind Prospect.

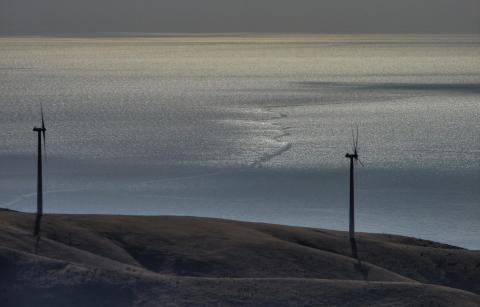
Some of the turbines at Starfish Hill wind farm; Gulf St Vincent in background

=== Starfish Hill Wind Farm (33 MW) ===
Starfish Hill Wind Farm is near Cape Jervis on the Fleurieu Peninsula. It comprises 22 turbines of 1.5 MW each, with turbines on Starfish Hill on the nearby Salt Creek Hill, giving a combined generating capacity of 33 MW. Starfish Hill Wind Farm was commissioned in September 2003, making it the first major wind farm in South Australia.

== Wind farm proposals ==
In addition to its operating wind farms, South Australia has several proposals for new farms at various stages of development. These include:

Designed capacity (MW)	Wind farm	Location	Developer	Development Status	Expected operational date
180	Barn Hill	Will fill the gap between Snowtown and Clements Gap wind farms on the Barunga Range southwest of Redhill	AGL Energy	2009 approved, 2013 revised	AGL target investment decision Mid 2023
600	Ceres Project	Yorke Peninsula	Spark Renewables (acquired May 2022 from Senvion Australia)	Approved 2014. Revised plan approved August 2019 New owner preparing fresh development application	Unknown
? - 26 turbines	Crystal Brook energy park	Crystal Brook	Neoen	August 2019 approval	Construction due 12 months from approval
144-250	Exmoor	Naracoorte	Acciona	Application lodged 2011, possibly lapsed by 2019	2017
412	Goyder South Wind Farm	Southeast of Burra	Neoen	Under construction	2024
105	Keyneton	Keyneton	Pacific Hydro	2013 approved. 2019 cancelled.	Construction was to start mid-2019
120	Kongorong	Kongorong (west of Mount Gambier)	RATCH-Australia	Possibly lapsed before 2019	Not mentioned on company web site
110	Kulpara	northwest of Port Wakefield	RATCH-Australia	Possibly lapsed before 2019	Not mentioned on company web site
375	Palmer	Palmer, Tungkillo, Sanderston	Tilt Renewables	In Development, being assessed against other options	Approved 2015, appeals dismissed 2019
206.5	Port Augusta Renewable Energy Park	south of Port Augusta	DP Energy and Iberdrola	Under construction	2022
14–200	Tungketta Hill/Elliston	Between Elliston and Sheringa	Ausker Energies	Approved	The developer's website (last updated in 2014) said construction would begin when transmission issues are resolved.
185	Twin Creek Wind Farm	northeast of Kapunda	RES Australia	May 2019 development consent October 2019 Development approval	
350	Woakwine	near Beachport	Infigen Energy	2012 approved	

== Cancelled wind farm proposals ==
=== Myponga Wind Farm ===
The Myponga Wind Farm was a wind farm proposal by TrustPower in the southern Mount Lofty Ranges, on the Fleurieu Peninsula 50 km south of Adelaide, between the towns of Myponga and Sellicks Beach. Development approval was granted in 2003, and the project was planned to be operational by the end of 2010. The approval was revoked in 2011.

In 2009, TrustPower announced that it would not proceed with the project, because the South Australian government had not approved variations to height, layout and turbine type in the existing planning approval. The requested change was to reduce the number of turbines to 16 but increase their power output and increase the height of the turbines from 100 metres to 110 metres. The planning approval was eventually revoked.

=== Keyneton ===
Pacific Hydro proposed to build a 105 MW wind farm near Keyneton east of the Barossa Valley. It was approved by the government in 2013. The proposal was cancelled in October 2019.

== Impacts ==
The increasing proportion of renewable energy in the state has caused a significant decrease in the emissions intensity of electricity generation in South Australia.

The rapid development of wind power in South Australia has led to direct economic effects from the construction and operation of wind farms. There has been a total of $2.8 billion in wind power investment up to October 2011, which is estimated to have created 3,000 direct and indirect jobs. Studies into the economic effects of wind farms have reported that a 50 MW installation pays host landholders some $250,000 per year, is constructed by workers who spend up to $1.2 million locally and contributes up to $80,000 annually to community projects.

Policies to streamline the approval process for wind farm developments have met with some community opposition. Specific concerns have been raised by rural residents who claim that wind farms have an unacceptable impact on property values, health and the environment.

There has been some controversy with respect to the impact of the rising share of wind power and other renewables such as solar on retail electricity prices in South Australia. A 2012 report by The Energy Users Association of Australia claimed that retail electricity prices in South Australia were then the third highest in the developed world behind Germany and Denmark, with prices likely to rise to become the most expensive in the near future. The then South Australian Opposition Leader, Isobel Redmond, linked the state's high retail prices for electricity to the Government's policy of promoting development of renewable energy, noting that Germany and Denmark had followed similar policies. On the other hand, it has been noted that the impact of wind power on the merit order effect, where relatively low cost wind power is purchased by retailers before higher cost sources of power, has been credited for a decline in the wholesale electricity price in South Australia. Data compiled by the Australian Energy Market Operator (AEMO) shows South Australian wholesale electricity prices are the third highest out of Australia's five mainland states, with the 2013 South Australian Electricity Report noting that increases in prices were "largely driven by transmission and distribution network price increases".

The South Australian Government has stated that the price increase due to the Australian Government's carbon price (in place from July 2012 to June 2014) was approximately half of that experienced by other states due to the high installed capacity of wind and gas-fired generation.

== 2011 Renewable Energy Plan ==
In October 2011 the South Australian state Government released a renewable energy plan proposing a range of measures including:

- a revised renewable energy target of 33% of the state's electricity production coming from renewable sources by 2020
- a ban on new coal-fired power stations
- greater involvement of local government in the development approval process to promote more effective community engagement
- investigations into increasing the capacity of transmission lines to support renewable energy developments including wind energy
- no wind farms allowed within one kilometre of any home unless agreement is reached between the developer and the home owner.

== See also ==
- List of active power stations in South Australia
- List of onshore wind farms
- List of wind farms in Australia
- List of wind farms in South Australia
- Energy in South Australia
- Renewable energy in Australia
- Wind power in Australia
