= Energy in South Australia =

South Australia is a leader in utility-scale renewable energy generation, and also produces gas and uranium for electricity generation. Gas production is mostly concentrated in the Cooper Basin in the state's north-east. Gas is delivered from these fields by pipeline to users interstate and to Port Adelaide where it fuels three separate gas-fired power plants. Uranium is also mined in South Australia, though nuclear power generation is prohibited nationally. The Olympic Dam mine is the world's single largest known deposit of uranium and represents 30% of the world's total uranium resource. Many utility-scale wind farms and solar farms have been commissioned during the 21st century and geology with potential for geothermal energy has also been identified but is yet to be developed.

During the Rann government, South Australia advanced plans to make South Australia a green energy hub for Australia's eastern seaboard. Wind power and solar power, including distributed roof-top solar, now provide much of the state's electricity. In the 2020s, proposals emerged to develop green hydrogen production and export capacity. In December 2021, South Australia set a new record for renewable energy generation and resilience, after running entirely on renewable energy for 6.5 consecutive days. In 2022, it was stated that South Australia could soon be powered by only renewable energy.

70 per cent of South Australia's electricity is generated from renewable sources. This is projected to be 85 per cent by 2026, with a target of 100 per cent by 2027.

== Electricity ==
Electricity generation in South Australia by year and fuel source, 2015-2021

=== Fossil fuels ===
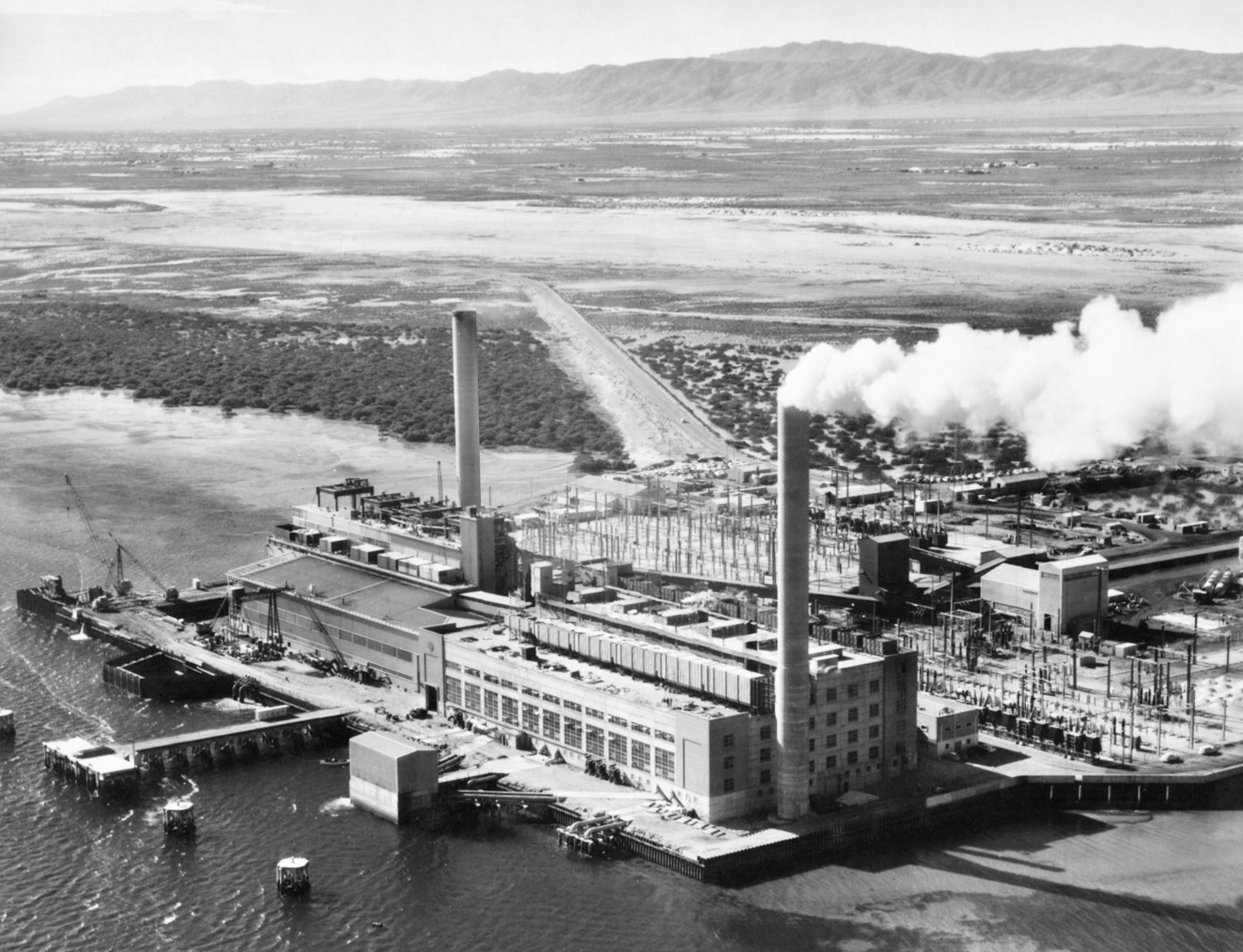
Thomas Playford Power Station circa 1962

Historically, much of South Australia's electricity was generated by coal-fueled power stations. As late as 2002, South Australia obtained 100% of its electricity supply from fossil fuels, with 30% being imported from coal generators in other states. The Electricity Trust of South Australia nationalized the main private generator and the electricity grid that covered most of the populated parts of the state in the 1940s. Initially, the power stations burned coal imported from the eastern states of Australia. The government decided that South Australia needed to be more self-sufficient. In the 1950s, it established the Telford Cut coal mine near Leigh Creek and built the Playford A Power Station near Port Augusta specifically designed to burn South Australian coal. It was followed in the 1960s by the Playford B Power Station. The last and largest coal power station built in South Australia was the Northern Power Station, built near the Playford stations in the 1980s. It was also the last coal-fired power station to close, in 2016.

Since the commencement of gas field development at Moomba in the 1950s and 1960s, electricity has been produced by gas-fueled generators at utility scale. The largest fossil-fuel generation precinct is located on the Le Fevre Peninsula near Port Adelaide, where multiple separate power plants are in operation. The largest of these is the Torrens Island Power Station operated by AGL with a generating capacity of 1,280 MW. The next largest is Pelican Point Power Station, operated by Engie, with a capacity of 478 MW. Fossil fuel generators are also used to power remote mining operations and some townships.

=== Renewable energy ===
After the 2002 South Australian state election, the Australian Labor Party formed a government under new premier Mike Rann. The Rann government outlined a plan to transition from fossil fuels to renewable energy sources, targeting that 15% of electricity would come from renewables by 2014, and 26% by 2020 (this compares with the federally legislated target at the time of 2% by 2020). This plan aimed to both reduce carbon emissions to combat climate change and reduce South Australia's reliance on importing electricity from other states. At the time the plan was seen as highly ambitious because the state government had very little direct control over the direction of electricity generation. The entire electricity grid was privately owned due to the neoliberal politics of the 1990's, and the federal government had the greatest regulatory power over the energy market. Despite the disadvantages the state government faced, South Australia exceeded their targets and by 2009, 20% of the state's electricity came from wind power.

South Australia has since led the nation in renewable energy commercialization. In 2011 it had 7.14% of the nation's population, capturing 56% of the grid connected wind power, 30% of solar power and 90% of its geothermal developments. Public policy has been one of the main drivers of the development. Given its reputation as having some of the windiest and sunniest places in Australia, South Australia is considered to be a target for green energy investors. The Rann government comprehensively mapped the state for both solar and wind resources, and identified that one of the best locations for generating wind power was in close proximity to the already-existing Port Augusta power stations.

The Australian Government invested AUD 1 million dollars in 2011 commissioning a study by Macquarie Capital, WorleyParsons and Baker & McKenzie to investigate the state's electricity transmission capacity and potential for expansion of renewable energy in South Australia. This study proposed that increasing the transmission capacity will unlock an estimated AUD 6 billion in renewable energy investment that would generate up to 5000 MW of clean and green energy The Economic Development Board recommended that the State make use of its unique natural advantages in generating wind, solar, geothermal and wave energy enabling the region to maintain its leading position in the development and use of "green" energy and establishing a significant renewable energy industry. An AUD 20 million renewable energy fund under the supervision of the Renewable SA Board were established. The first investment of AUD 1.6 million will be spent over two years to create a South Australian Centre for Geothermal Research, in conjunction with the University of Adelaide. The Fund will boost up investment in research and development, examine opportunities for manufacturing, and help assess how to develop a "green grid" based in South Australia but linked directly into the national power grid. Two utilities have deployed house batteries to provide grid services in a virtual power plant and reduce need for network upgrades. However, such installations only provide synthetic inertia which was excluded from the 2017 energy security target, and included in later targets.

In 2020, wind and solar supplied the equivalent of 60% of electricity in South Australia. During the financial year 2020-21, consumption was 11,614 GWh, of which wind provided 41% at 5,738 GWh, and gas provided 37%. Average pollution reached a low point, at 0.26 tonnes per MWh in 2020-21, and power cost at $48/MWh was the lowest of the mainland states. Power price became high less often and negative more often, usually around noon, and solar power production received lower average price while gas and batteries received higher prices. By 2024 more than half of all homes in South Australia have rooftop solar (2500 MW), minimum grid demand is sometimes negative, even on weekdays.

==== Grid reliability ====
By 2017, the increase in renewable energy could sometimes satisfy the entire electricity grid demand in South Australia. However many of the facilities did not provide technical system strength to ensure that the grid remained stable and reliable under fluctuations in supply or demand. This meant that even when the wind was blowing strongly, the Australian Energy Market Operator demanded that a number of gas-fired generators be turned on to provide system inertia. Such interventions by AEMO amounted to $34 million per year. ElectraNet sought tenders to provide this system strength to the network, however determined that all of the offers were too expensive. Batteries and syncons were installed to increase grid security. In 2019, ElectraNet announced that it proposed to install four synchronous condensers on the grid in South Australia. It proposes to build a pair at Davenport near Port Augusta and a second pair near Robertstown. They were expected to be fully operational by the end of 2020. In August 2021, the installation of the synchronous condensers was complete, and they were undergoing commissioning and testing. They were operational in October 2021, increasing the limit on solar and wind power from 1,700 MW to 2,500 MW. By 2025, the South Australia grid sometimes has sufficient stability to run only one 40 MW gas turbine.

==== Transmission infrastructure ====
Transmission developments have been proposed to support the grid and renewable energy. These include Project EnergyConnect, a 900 km, 800 MW, 330 kV double circuit transmission line between South Australia and New South Wales with partial commissioning in 2025, and the A$300m Eyre Peninsula Link, a 275 km, 132 kV double circuit transmission line on the Eyre Peninsula, with commissioning expected in 2022, and a section able to be upgraded to 275 kV when required.

==== Political backlash ====
During South Australia's transition to renewable energy, Australia's federal government has been often ambivalent or hostile towards renewables. South Australia experienced a widespread power outage in September 2016 due to storm damage. Two tornadoes damaged transmission lines, which caused a cascading failure in the electricity network. Members of the federal government, including Deputy Prime Minister Barnaby Joyce, blamed the blackout on South Australia's reliance on renewable energy despite the lack of evidence that this was the cause. Federal energy minister Josh Frydenberg held a press conference in South Australia, which South Australian premier Jay Weatherill gatecrashed. Weatherill lambasted Frydenberg and referred to the federal government as "the most anti-South Australian Commonwealth government in living history." The Australian Energy Market Operator ultimately cited overly sensitive protection mechanisms as the cause of the blackout.

South Australia had another, smaller blackout in February 2017, this time caused by a mishap by the AEMO. The operator ordered load shedding because it did not believe that there was the capacity to meet the state's electricity demands. 90,000 users instead of 30,000 users were taken off the network due to a computer glitch. The Australian Energy Regulator later alleged that the Pelican Point Power Station had failed to inform the AEMO that it could operate at full capacity, which would have prevented the need for offloading and the blackout. In response to this blackout Scott Morrison, then federal Treasurer, brought a lump of coal into Parliament House and again argued that this blackout was the fault of South Australia's shift to renewable energy, saying "the South Australian Labor government is switching off jobs, switching off lights and switching off air conditioners and forcing Australian families to boil in the dark as a result of their Dark Ages policies."

=== Wind ===
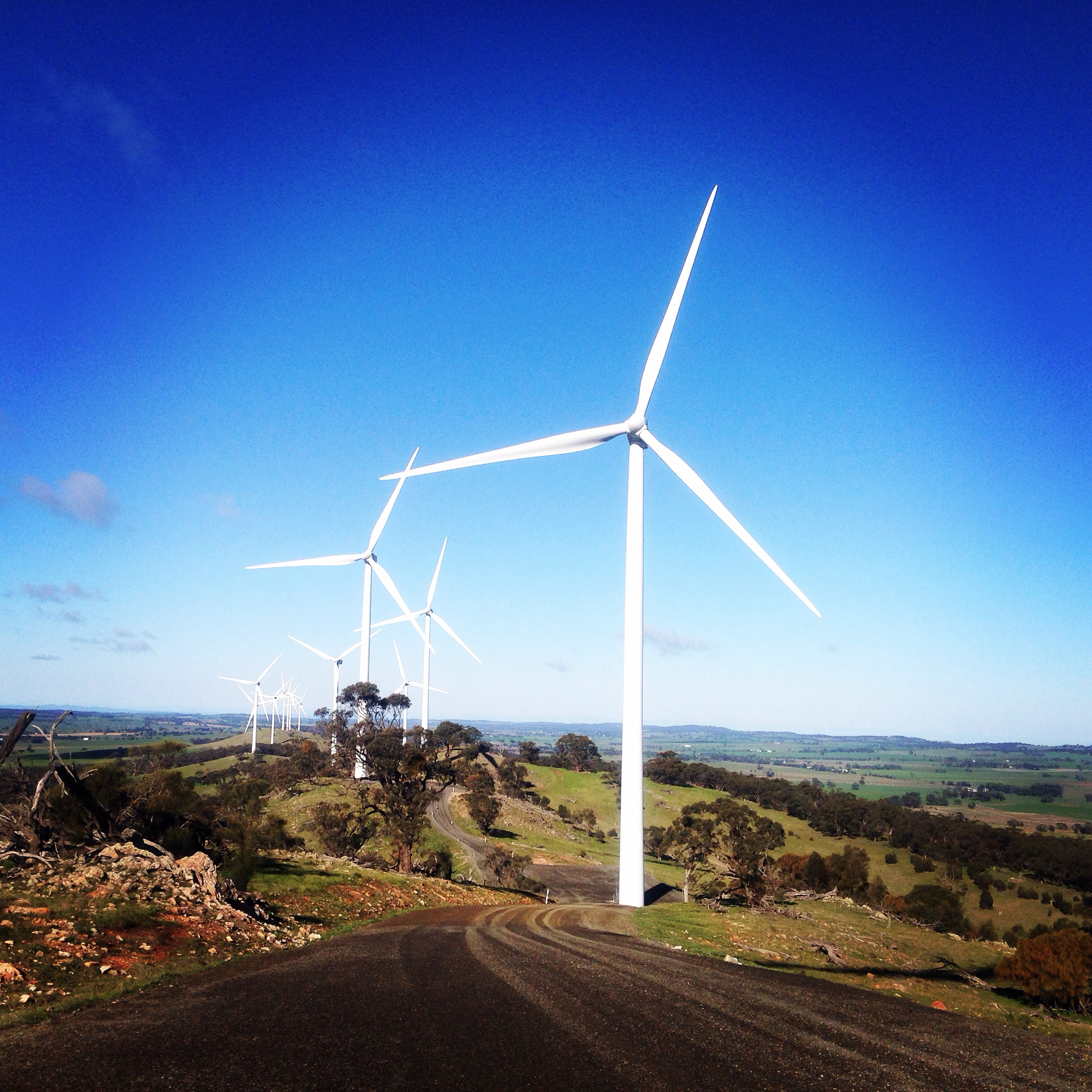
Waterloo wind farm, South Australia 2014

The Australian Energy Market Operator (AEMO) 2010 SA Supply Demand Outlook estimated that in 2009–10, 18% of the state's energy production came from wind power. In 2022-2023, South Australian wind farms produced enough power to meet 47% of the state's electricity needs.

South Australia was the largest producer of wind energy in Australia, as of April 2011 hosting 49% of the nation's installed capacity. In mid-2009, RenewablesSA was established to encourage further investment in renewable energy to the state. As of October 2024, South Australia had 24 operational wind farms, with an installed capacity of 2,348 MW.

=== Solar ===
The South Australian Government's Retailer Energy Efficiency Scheme supplies rebates for the installation of solar hot water heat pumps.

There are four large-scale (30 MW and above) operational solar farms in South Australia.

In October 2020, South Australia solar power exceeded 100% of the state's electricity demand for the first time;

=== Interconnection ===
The South Australian grid is connected to the National Electricity Market via the 650 MW 275 KV AC Heywood interconnector to Victoria.

In addition, as of 2024, construction of Project EnergyConnect is ongoing, which will connect South Australia's grid to that of New South Wales.

=== Storage ===
South Australia has several battery projects, operating and planned.

The 150 MW (194 MWh) Hornsdale Power Reserve is a bank of grid-connected batteries adjacent to the Hornsdale Wind Farm. It was the largest lithium-ion battery in the world for some time. It was surpassed by the 477 MWh Blyth battery, and will be surpassed by Maoneng's Gould Creek battery project, which was approved in late 2021 and once constructed will have a storage capacity of 450 MWh.

Smaller batteries also play a role in maintaining grid stability as renewable energy production rises and falls. The Dalrymple ESCRI battery is a 30 MW / 8 MWh battery installed on Yorke Peninsula owned by Electranet and operated by AGL Energy. It was commissioned in June 2018.

In September 2018, the South Australian Government announced that it would offer $100M in state government subsidies for up to 40,000 households to install battery storage in their homes. Eligible home owners and renters could receive $500 per kWh up to a maximum of $6,000 for eligible solar and battery systems.

=== Geothermal ===
Geothermal energy refers to the heat generated naturally by the earth, which can be used for the production of electricity. One of the greatest advantages of geothermal energy is said to be the reduction in CO_{2} emission. Unlike some other energy alternatives, which rely on intermittent supply of sunlight or wind, geothermal power generation can be used, like more traditional sources, for long term base-load power 24/7. South Australia hosts significant geothermal resources, with a surface heat flow of 92 ± 10 mW m^{2}, compared to a heat flow of 49-54 mW m^{2} in geologically similar regions.

Unlike many other parts of the world such as New Zealand and Iceland where geothermal energy sources result from circulating groundwater heated by a shallow magma source, heat flow in South Australia primarily results from elevated concentrations of radiogenic nuclides such as uranium-238, thorium-232 and potassium-40 in granitic basement rocks. The radiogenic concentration of basement rock in the South Australian Heat Flow Anomaly (SAHFA) is over three times greater than the global mean for similar regions. Thick layers of overlying sediment insulate and trap in the deeper heat. Due to the low permeability of granite, the hot rocks must undergo hydraulic fracturing and be stimulated to allow a flow of water through the system to produce energy. This heat is slowly conducted to shallower rocks near the surface.

Petratherm propose developing the geothermal energy in the more permeable sedimentary rocks that overlay the hot granite, a process called Heat Exchange Within Insulator (HEWI). While somewhat cooler, in many cases they do not require hydraulic fracturing.

It is estimated that one percent of geothermal energy shallower than five kilometres below the earth's surface and hotter than 150 °C can supply Australia's total energy requirement for 26,000 years. South Australia and Tasmania, where the granite basement rocks are suitable, are the main locations where geothermal energy is being developed in Australia. Sedimentary style geothermal resources have also been located near the south Victorian coastline stretching across South Australia.

Both the state and federal government are making efforts to support and sponsor research for realizing geothermal energy commercially. The South Australian Centre for Geothermal Energy Research (SACGER) was established in 2010 as a part of the state government's Renewable Energy Fund in order to promote a world class hub for practical, high priority geothermal energy research. This 3.6 million dollar funding will help South Australia to reach its target of producing 33% of renewable energy by 2020. Apart from designing geophysical tools, imaging the possible geothermal reservoirs, improving simulation of fracture and fluid networks in geothermal reservoirs, SACGER is also involved in developing trace elements micro-analytical imaging facilities for South Australia through key analytical infrastructure advances and mapping fracture systems in South Australian geothermal reservoir analogues.

Geoscience Australia has taken initiatives to identify the hot spots of active geothermal regions for supporting geothermal industry. Onshore Energy Security Program, an initiative by the federal government, has been set up a field logging program to improve the heat flow coverage of Australia. OzTemp database is designed to measure temperature from different sources and extrapolate these to five kilometres' depth.

=== Other ===
South Australia's only hydroelectric generation is the 3 MW Terminal Storage Mini Hydro installed in SA Water supply pipes in a northeastern suburb of Adelaide. It generates electricity from water flowing downhill from one storage dam to the "terminal storage" facility that feeds into the metropolitan water distribution network.

An investigation into the feasibility of constructing pumped hydroelectric energy storage in Cultana was completed in 2020, which determined that the revenue uncertainty and high capital cost made it unviable.

There are also small electricity generators using collected waste gases at several of the metropolitan waste water treatment plants and the large landfill dump at Wingfield, north of Adelaide.

=== Prices ===
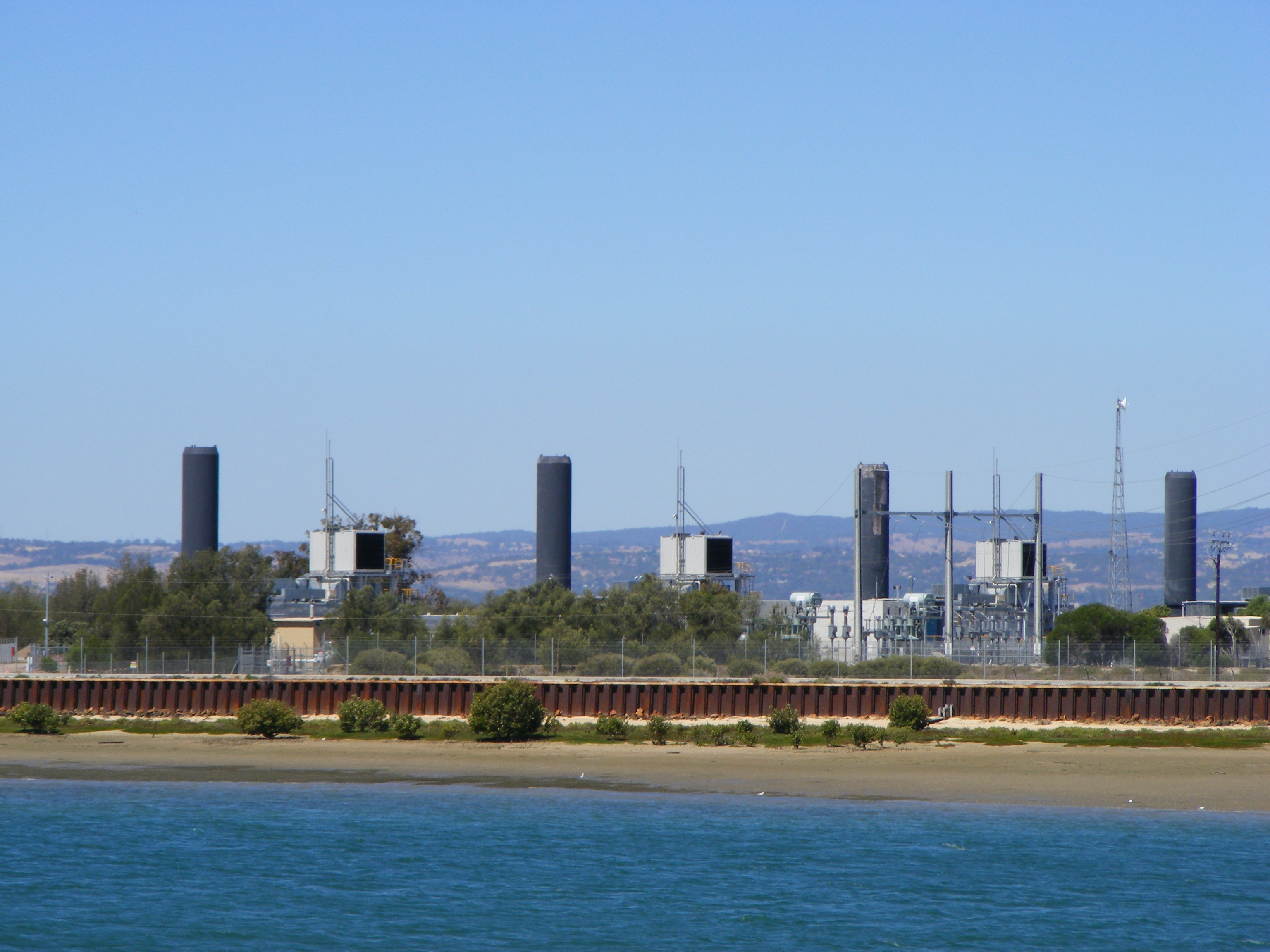
Quarantine Power Station, Adelaide

The 2013 South Australian Electricity Report noted that increases in prices were "largely driven by transmission and distribution network price increases". In contrast, the Australian Energy Market Operator (AEMO) has noted that the South Australian wholesale prices are lower than they have been since the start of the national electricity market, and that the wind "tends to depress the South Australian regional prices". The Government stated that the price increase due to the Carbon Tax was approximately half of that experienced by other states, due to the high installed capacity of wind and gas-fired generation.

Following the 2016 South Australian blackout, the South Australian government increased its ministerial powers to direct energy corporations in times of peak demand.

It was claimed in 2017 that South Australia had the most expensive electricity in the world Another analysis claimed that South Australia has the second cheapest electricity in Australia. During the COVID-19 pandemic in Australia, demand and electricity prices in South Australia fell to the lowest since 2012.
