= Roaring 40s =

- Company type: Joint venture
- Industry: Energy
- Founded: September 2005
- Defunct: June 2011
- Headquarters: Hobart, Australia
- Area served: Oceania
- Products: Electricity
- Parent: Hydro Tasmania (50%); CLP Group (50%)
- Website: www.roaring40s.com

Roaring 40s was an electricity generator formed in 2005 as a 50:50 joint venture between Hydro Tasmania and CLP Group.

Roaring 40s had 13 sites in operation or in planning in Australia, China, Hong Kong and India. Cathedral Rocks, Goyder, Musselroe, Waterloo and Woolnorth were windfarmss that it owned.

In June 2009, the company's wind farms in China and India were taken over by CLP Group. The joint venture was dissolved in June 2011 with the assets being divided between the two partners.
