= Lincoln Gap =

Lincoln Gap may refer to:

- Lincoln Gap, South Australia
  - Lincoln Gap Wind Farm
- Lincoln Gap (Vermont)
- Lincoln Gap, Lincolnshire
