= Port Stanvac Refinery =

Oil refinery in the Australian state of South Australia

Port Stanvac (Note: STANVAC is short for the Standard Vacuum Oil Company, a joint venture between the Socony Vacuum Oil Company of New York and Standard Oil of New Jersey, the latter the predecessor to ExxonMobil.)
- Location within South Australia
- Location: Adelaide, South Australia, Australia; 35°06′37″S 138°28′16″E

Refinery details
- Operator: ExxonMobil Australia
- Owner: Petroleum Refineries (Australia) Pty Ltd
- Opened: 1963
- Closed: 2009
- Capacity: 3.3 million tons per annum

Port Stanvac Refinery was an oil refinery in the Australian state of South Australia located in Lonsdale, a southern suburb of Adelaide. Its construction was announced in 1958 and began refining crude oil in 1963.

It had a capacity of 3.3 million tons per annum and was owned by ExxonMobil Australia (and previously Mobil). The refinery was mothballed in 2003, and in 2009 ExxonMobil announced its permanent closure and demolition.

The 239 hectares (590 acres) site is being demolished and cleaned up through 2019. The site has been slated for a housing development. This was announced in November 2024, for completion in late 2020's.

The refinery's most prominent structure, the 90 metres (300 ft) chimney, was demolished on 31 January 2014. Mobil will face penalties if the site is not remediated by 2019. The land will be sold in phases.

Part of the site is now used for the Adelaide Desalination Plant. Four gas turbines were installed by the Government of South Australia in 2017 for the Temporary Generation South power station. Operation was transferred to Infigen Energy in May 2020 under a 25-year lease, and will be moved to a different site at Bolivar.
