= Temporary Generation South =

- Country: Australia
- Location: Lonsdale
- Coordinates: 35.100°S 138.487°E
- Commission date: November 2017
- Decommission date: May 2022
- Owner: Government of South Australia
- Operator: Infigen Energy from May 2020

Thermal power station
- Primary fuel: Diesel
- Turbine technology: gas turbine

Power generation
- Make and model: General Electric TM2500
- Units decommissioned: 4
- Nameplate capacity: 120MW

Temporary Generation South and its larger sibling Temporary Generation North were gas turbine power stations in South Australia. They were bought by the Government of South Australia in 2017 as a response to the 2016 South Australian blackout and load-shedding in February 2017.

Temporary Generation South was four open cycle gas turbines at the former Port Stanvac Refinery at Lonsdale.

The generators were purchased to be used only in emergency shortfalls in electricity supply to the grid, such as in extreme hot weather. They were first used on 24 January 2019 to deal with a supply shortfall in Victoria.

The intent of the Weatherill ALP state government was that the turbines will be converted from diesel fuel to natural gas and moved to a single location while remaining owned by the government.

In August 2019, the state government (following the 2018 election, now controlled by the Liberal party) announced that it had arranged 25-year leases of the power stations to two different companies, with the leases taking effect from May 2020. Both companies operate wind farms in South Australia. The four generators at Lonsdale will be leased to Infigen Energy and will be moved from the SA Water desalination plant to the SA Water Bolivar Waste Water Treatment Plant and converted to operate on natural gas instead of diesel. The plant was closed in May 2022, with intent to complete the relocation to Bolivar and conversion to gas by the end of 2022.
