= Snapper Point Power Station =

Gas turbine power station in South Australia

- Country: Australia
- Coordinates: 34°45′52″S 138°30′27″E
- Operator: Nexif Energy

Thermal power station
- Turbine technology: Gas turbine

Power generation
- Nameplate capacity: 154 MW

The Snapper Point Power Station is a gas turbine power station situated at Outer Harbor, South Australia, adjacent to the older Pelican Point Power Station.

Snapper Point Power Station is owned by Nexif Energy and is a peaking power plant. In addition to general supply Nexif use it to provide firm reliability for electricity supply contracts from Nexif's Lincoln Gap Wind Farm. It uses the five GE TM2500 mobile aero-derivative gas turbine generation units acquired from the Government of South Australia, which previously comprised the Temporary Generation North power station. Each unit is rated for 30.8 MW net output for a total generation capacity of 154 MW.

The plant commenced operation on 10 June 2022 after having been originally expected to be online by 1 July 2023. Operation was initially subject to an overnight curfew by the Environment Protection Authority (South Australia) due to noise. Custom-built silencers were subsequently added and the curfew was provisionally lifted from 4 December 2023.
