= Temporary Generation North =

Gas turbine power station

- Country: Australia
- Location: Elizabeth South
- Coordinates: 34.744°S 138.653°E
- Status: decommissioned
- Commission date: November 2017
- Decommission date: Q1 2021
- Owner: Government of South Australia
- Operator: Nexif Energy from May 2020

Thermal power station
- Primary fuel: Diesel
- Turbine technology: gas turbine

Power generation
- Make and model: General Electric TM2500
- Units decommissioned: 5
- Nameplate capacity: 154MW

Temporary Generation North and its smaller sibling Temporary Generation South were gas turbine power stations in South Australia. They were bought by the Government of South Australia in 2017 as a response to the 2016 South Australian blackout and load-shedding in February 2017.

Temporary Generation North was five open cycle gas turbines installed at the former Holden site in Elizabeth South, a northern suburb of Adelaide. It was closed in the first quarter of 2021 so that the turbines could be moved to become the Snapper Point Power Station at Outer Harbor.

The generators were purchased to be used only in emergency shortfalls in electricity supply to the grid, such as in extreme weather. Both sets were first used on 24 January 2019 to deal with a supply shortfall in Victoria.

The intent of the Weatherill ALP state government was that the turbines would be converted from diesel fuel to natural gas and moved to a single location while remaining owned by the government.

In August 2019, the state government (following the 2018 election, now controlled by the Liberal party) announced that it had arranged 25-year leases of the power stations to two different companies, with the leases taking effect from May 2020. Both companies operate wind farms in South Australia. The five northern generators were leased to Nexif Energy and are being relocated to a new site at Outer Harbor and operating on natural gas, intended to be before the end of 2020. Nexif Energy also proposes to convert them to combined cycle with a steam turbine in the following few years. This schedule was delayed by the COVID-19 pandemic, with Temporary Generation North closing in the first quarter of 2021, and Snapper Point in commissioning as of April 2022.
