= Kangaroo Island Power Station =

Power station in South Australia

- Country: Australia
- Location: Brownlow KI, South Australia
- Coordinates: 35.666651°S 137.6028504°E
- Status: Operational
- Commission date: 2016
- Owner: SA Power Networks
- Operator: SA Power Networks

Thermal power station
- Primary fuel: Diesel fuel

Power generation
- Nameplate capacity: 6 MW

The Kangaroo Island power station is a set of diesel generators located at the Kingscote substation at Brownlow KI on Kangaroo Island.

It consists of three 2MWe Caterpillar 3516B generators capable of providing a combined 6 MW of power.

Owned and operated by SA Power Networks, it is used to provide stability of supply if both of the submarine power cables to the mainland are unavailable.

== See also ==
- List of power stations in South Australia
