= Foresight Group =

British private equity and venture capital business

Foresight Group Holdings plc
- Type: Public
- Traded as: LSE: FSG
- Industry: Financial services
- Founded: 1984
- Headquarters: London, England
- Key people: Bernard Fairman (Chairman); Gary Fraser (CEO)
- Revenue: ▲£164.9 million (2026)
- Operating income: ▲£54.0 million (2026)
- Net income: ▲£42.8 million (2026)
- Website: www.foresightgroup.eu

Foresight Group Holdings plc is a British investment manager focussed on private equity and venture capital investments in clean energy generation, and associated infrastructure. It is listed on the London Stock Exchange and is a constituent of the FTSE 250 Index.

== History ==
The company was founded by Bernard Fairman and Peter English in 1984. They initially raised £20 million in venture capital. The company subsequently built up a regional presence with offices in Edinburgh, Cambridge, Manchester, Milton Keynes, Leicester, Nottingham, and Dublin. It launched the Foresight Solar Fund in October 2013.

The company was the subject of an initial public offering on the London Stock Exchange, which valued the company at £455 million, in April 2021. In August 2023, having already established funds dedicated to other parts of the UK, it announced that it had raised £90m for a fund dedicated to the North East of England.

== Operations ==
The company had £12.8 billion of assets under management as of 31 March 2025.
