= List of energy storage projects in South Australia =

As of 2020, South Australia has 3 grid-connected energy storage devices, with a total capacity of 205 MW / 253.5 MWh.

== Table ==
| Project name | Sponsoring company | Coordinates | Capacity (MW) | Storage (MWh) | Technology | Status | Notes |
|---|---|---|---|---|---|---|---|
| Dalrymple ESCRI Battery | AGL Energy | 34.936°S 137.744°E | 30 | 8 | Lithium Ion Battery | Operating | |
| Hornsdale Power Reserve | Neoen Australia | 33.058°S 138.544°E | 150 | 193.5 | Lithium Ion Battery | Operating | Was 100MW/129MWh, until 50% expansion in July 2020. Expanded to 150MW/193.5MW. |
| Lake Bonney Battery Energy Storage System | Infigen Energy | 37.739°S 140.387°E | 25 | 52 | Lithium Ion Battery | Operating | |
| Lincoln Gap Wind Farm Battery Energy Storage System | Fluence | | 10 | 10 | Lithium Ion Battery | Commissioning | |
| Baroota Pumped Hydro | Rise Renewables | | 250 | 2000 | Pumped Hydro | Approved | |
| Cultana Pumped Hydro | EnergyAustralia / Arup Group | | 225 | 1800 | Pumped Hydro | Cancelled | |
| Goat Hill Pumped Hydro | Altura Group | | 230 | 1840 | Pumped Hydro | Cancelled | |
| Highbury Pumped Hydro | Tilt Renewables | | 300 | 1350 | Pumped Hydro | Cancelled | |
| Kanmantoo Pumped Hydro | AGL Energy | | 250 | 2000 | Pumped Hydro | Cancelled | |
| Kingfisher Battery Power Plant | Lyon Group | | 100 | 400 | Lithium Ion Battery | Proposed | |
| Bungama Solar | EPS Energy | | 140 | 560 | Lithium Ion Battery | Approved | |
| Robertstown Solar | EPS Energy | | 250 | 1000 | Lithium Ion Battery | Approved | |
| Solar River Project | Alinta Energy | | 100 | 300 | Battery | Proposed | |
| Playford Battery | GFG Alliance | | 100 | 200 | Lithium Ion Battery | Cancelled | |
| Middleback Range Pumped Hydro | GFG Alliance | | 90 | 390 | Pumped Hydro | Assumed Cancelled | |
| Torrens Island Battery | AGL Energy | | 250 | 250 | Lithium Ion Battery | Commissioning | |
