= Dulacca Wind Farm =

Wind farm in Queensland, Australia

- Country: Australia
- Location: Western Downs Region, Queensland
- Coordinates: 26.63228180342344°S 149.86777090836625°E
- Status: Operational
- Construction began: October 2021
- Commission date: April 2023
- Construction cost: A$450m
- Owner: Octopus Investments
- Operator: Octopus Capital Australia Pty Ltd

Wind farm
- Type: Onshore
- Hub height: 155 metres (509 ft)
- Rotor diameter: 150 metres (492 ft)
- Site area: 8,000 hectares (80.00 km^{2})

Power generation
- Units operational: 43 × 4.2 MW
- Make and model: Vestas V150
- Nameplate capacity: 180.6 MW

External links
- Website: https://www.dulaccawindfarm.com.au/

Dulacca Wind Farm is a 180.6 megawatt (MW) wind farm in the Australian state of Queensland. It is located in the Western Downs Region of southern Queensland, 10 kilometres east of Dulacca, 12 kilometres west of Drillham, and 250 kilometres west of Toowoomba, both north and south of the Warrego Highway and the Western Railway Line.

The farm covers approximately 8000 hectares of land, predominantly used for cattle grazing and cropping. Construction started in October 2021 and was completed in April 2023.

The wind farm contains 43 Vestas V150 turbines, each of which can generate 4.2 MW of electricity. They each have a 155-metre hub height and a rotor diameter of 150 metres, resulting in a tip height of 230 metres. The cost of the project is estimated to be around $450 million.
