= Solar River Project =

- Country: Australia
- Location: north of Robertstown, South Australia
- Coordinates: 33.78°S 139.38°E
- Status: Proposed
- Construction began: 2027
- Construction cost: A$540 million

Solar farm
- Type: Flat-panel PV
- Collectors: 628,000 (stage 1)
- Site area: 5,000 hectares (12,000 acres)

Power generation
- Nameplate capacity: 210 MW
- Storage capacity: 750 MW·h

Solar River Project is a proposed photovoltaic power station planned to be built near Robertstown in South Australia. As of 2025, plans are for 210 MW solar, and a 256 MW battery.

== History ==
The project received development approval from the Government of South Australia in June 2018 and was expected to start construction early in 2019. However, as of November 2021, the project was still proposed to be constructed, but work on site was not expected until at least the second half of 2022.

The company developing it is based at the University of Adelaide's venture incubator, ThincLab. The project has the support of the Ngadjuri people and the Regional Council of Goyder.

Stage 1 includes 200 MW of solar photovoltaic electricity generation and a 120 MW·h lithium ion battery system and was proposed to start construction early in 2019, generating its first generation before the end of the same year. Stage 1 will consist of one hundred single-axis tracker arrays each generating 2 MW and approximately 310 by 180 metres (1,020 by 590 ft) for a total area of 3,200 by 1,800 metres (10,500 by 5,900 ft). Stage 2 is proposed to provide another 200 MW of generation and a 150 MW·h battery.

The land is north of Goyder's Line and 6 kilometres (3.7 mi) north of the Goyder Highway on crown land unsuitable for cropping due to the low rainfall.

Downer Group was engaged in January 2019 for early contractor involvement, with construction expected to commence in July 2019 and stage 1 to take two years to build. The project had provision for three more stages, depending on market and network conditions. In July, the project's website said that construction would start in the fourth quarter of 2019. By November 2019, this had slipped to the first quarter of 2020.

Alinta Energy had committed to buy 75% of the solar farm's output for 15 years, however that contract expired due to delays in the project caused by issues such as the withdrawal of Downer Group as EPC contractor.

The grid-connected battery will be supplied by GE Renewable Energy. It is expected to be 100MW/300MWh, larger than any grid-connected batteries in the world at the time of its announcement in 2019.
