= Foresight Solar Fund =

British investment trust

- Traded as: LSE: FSFL
- Industry: Investment trust
- Founded: October 2013
- Headquarters: Saint Helier, Jersey
- Key people: Tony Roper (Chairman)
- Website: https://www.foresightsolar.com/

Foresight Solar Fund (LSE: FSFL) is a British investment trust dedicated to investments in solar energy.

== History ==
Foresight Solar Fund was established as an investment trust in October 2013. At the time, it was the UK's largest investment trust dedicated to solar energy. In 2021, the company changed its investment strategy to allow an allocation of up to 10% of the portfolio in battery energy storage systems and, in 2022, it changed it again to allow up to 5% of the portfolio in development-stage projects.

In February 2025, Foresight began auctioning off its portfolio of Australian solar farms, valued at over $200 million.

In June 2025, a takeover proposal from Foresight Solar Fund was rejected by NextEnergy Solar Fund. The deal would have created a fund valued at £800 million.
