= Bald Hills Wind Farm =

Wind farm in Victoria, Australia

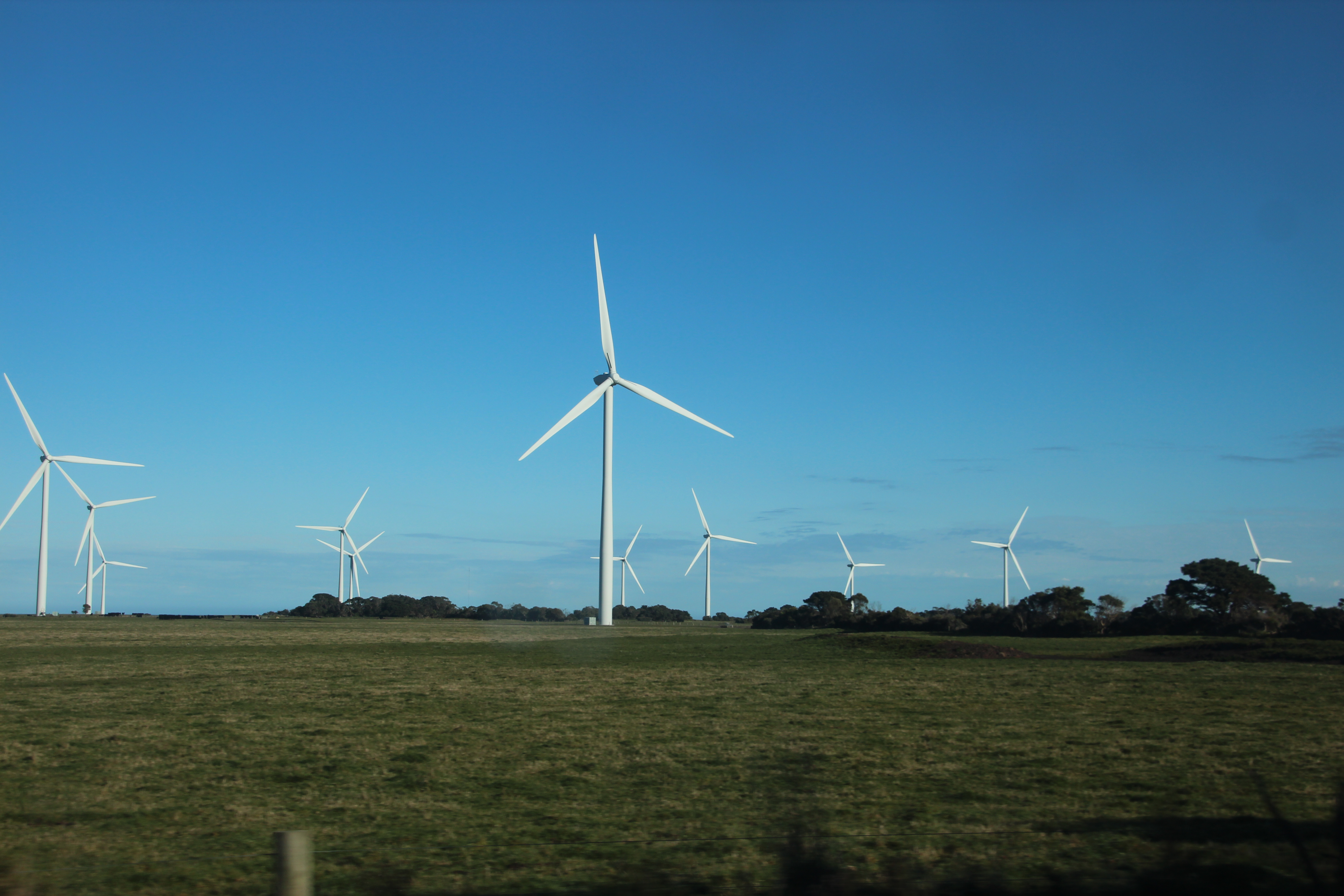
- Bald Hills Wind Farm in 2017
- Country: Australia
- Location: 10 km south east of Tarwin Lower, Victoria
- Coordinates: 38.789°S 145.926°E
- Status: Operational
- Commission date: 2015
- Owner: Energy Infrastructure Trust

Wind farm
- Type: Onshore
- Hub height: 85 metres (279 ft)
- Rotor diameter: 92.5 metres (303 ft)
- Site area: 1,750 hectares (4,300 acres)

Power generation
- Units operational: 52 × 2.05 MW
- Make and model: Senvion MM92
- Nameplate capacity: 106.6 MW
- Capacity factor: 40.69% (projected)
- Annual net output: 380 GWh (projected)

External links
- Website: baldhillswindfarm.com.au

The Bald Hills Wind Farm is an operating wind farm located approximately 10 km south east of Tarwin Lower in South Gippsland, Victoria, Australia. The Bald Hills Wind Farm site covers approximately 1,750ha of largely cleared cattle and sheep grazing farmland. The turbines are located in three distinct areas, one to the west and one to the east of Tarwin Lower Waratah Road, and one near the end of Bald Hills Road.

== Overview ==
The Bald Hills Wind Farm received planning approval from the Victorian Government and approval from the Federal Government under the Environmental Protection and Biodiversity Conservation (EPBC) Act. This followed extensive project feasibility studies and Environmental Effects Statements (EESs). The EESs were assessed by an independent panel.

Bald Hills Wind Farm comprises 52 turbines of 2.05 MW capacity each, giving it a total capacity of 106.6 MW. It is expected to produce 380 GWh of electricity per year, based on the long-term average forecast wind data. This is the equivalent of meeting the electricity requirements of over 62,000 homes—over four and a half times the homes in the South Gippsland Shire (based on 2006 census data).

Construction of the wind farm commenced in August 2012 and it became fully operational in May 2015.

In 2022, the Supreme Court held the wind farm had caused a noise nuisance to two nearby residents, and indicated it would award damages and grant an injunction to restrain further nuisances.
