= Nexif Energy =

- Founded: August 2015; 9 years ago in Singapore
- Headquarters: Singapore, Singapore
- Parent: Nexif
- Website: www.nexifenergy.com

Nexif RATCH Energy is a Singapore-based company that owns and operates wind farms and other renewable energy projects in several countries. It is a joint venture of Nexif and RATCH Group Thailand PCL founded in December 2022.

== Power sources ==
Nexif power stations
Site	Country	Location	Type	Generation (MW)
Lincoln Gap Wind Farm	Australia	Lincoln Gap, South Australia	Wind farm	212
Glen Innes Wind Farm	Australia	Glen Innes, New South Wales	Wind farm	90
Ben Tre wind farm	Vietnam	Thạnh Phú District, Ben Tre Province	Wind farm	80
Coc San Hydro Power	Vietnam	Lào Cai Province	Run of the river hydro	30
Nexif Energy Rayong (NER)	Thailand	Rayong	Combined cycle	110

In August 2019, Nexif took up a 25-year lease of the Temporary Generation North consisting of five open cycle gas turbines in South Australia, with the lease taking effect from May 2020. The generators will be relocated by Nexif to a new site at Outer Harbor and converted to operate on natural gas before the end of 2020. Nexif also proposes to convert them to combined cycle with a steam turbine in the following few years.
