= Starfish Hill Wind Farm =

Wind power station in southern Australia

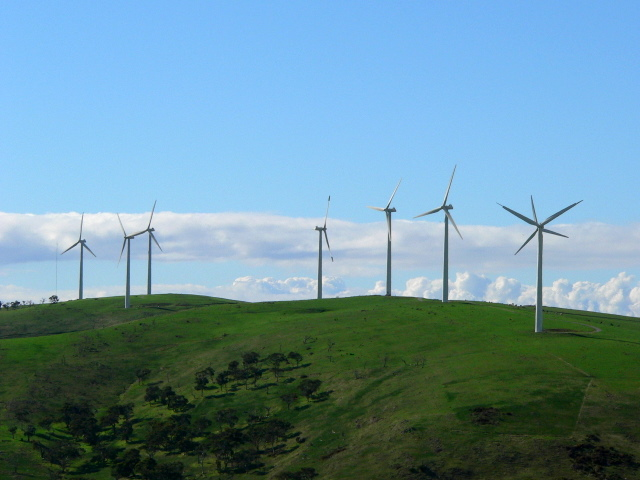
- Country: Australia
- Coordinates: 35.5843°S 138.1402°E
- Commission date: September 2003
- Construction cost: $65 million
- Owner: RATCH-Australia

Wind farm
- Type: Onshore
- Hub height: 68 m (223 ft)
- Rotor diameter: 64 m (210 ft)

Power generation
- Units operational: 22
- Make and model: NEG Micon: NM64C
- Nameplate capacity: 35 MW
- Annual net output: 100 GWh

External links
- Commons: Related media on Commons

Starfish Hill Wind Farm is a wind power station spread over two hills near Cape Jervis, South Australia. It has 22 wind turbines, eight on Starfish Hill itself and 14 on Salt Creek Hill, with a combined generating capacity of 33 MW of electricity.

Starfish Hill Wind Farm was commissioned in September 2003, making it the first major wind farm in the state. On 30 October 2010, one of the original 23 turbines caught fire and was destroyed. It was not replaced, leaving the wind farm with 22 turbines.

Starfish Hill Wind Farm was developed by Tarong Energy at a cost of $65 million. RATCH-Australia (at that time part of Transfield Services) acquired the wind farm in December 2007.

== See also ==
- Wind power in South Australia
