= Hallett Wind Farm =

Wind farm in South Australia

Hallett Wind Farms
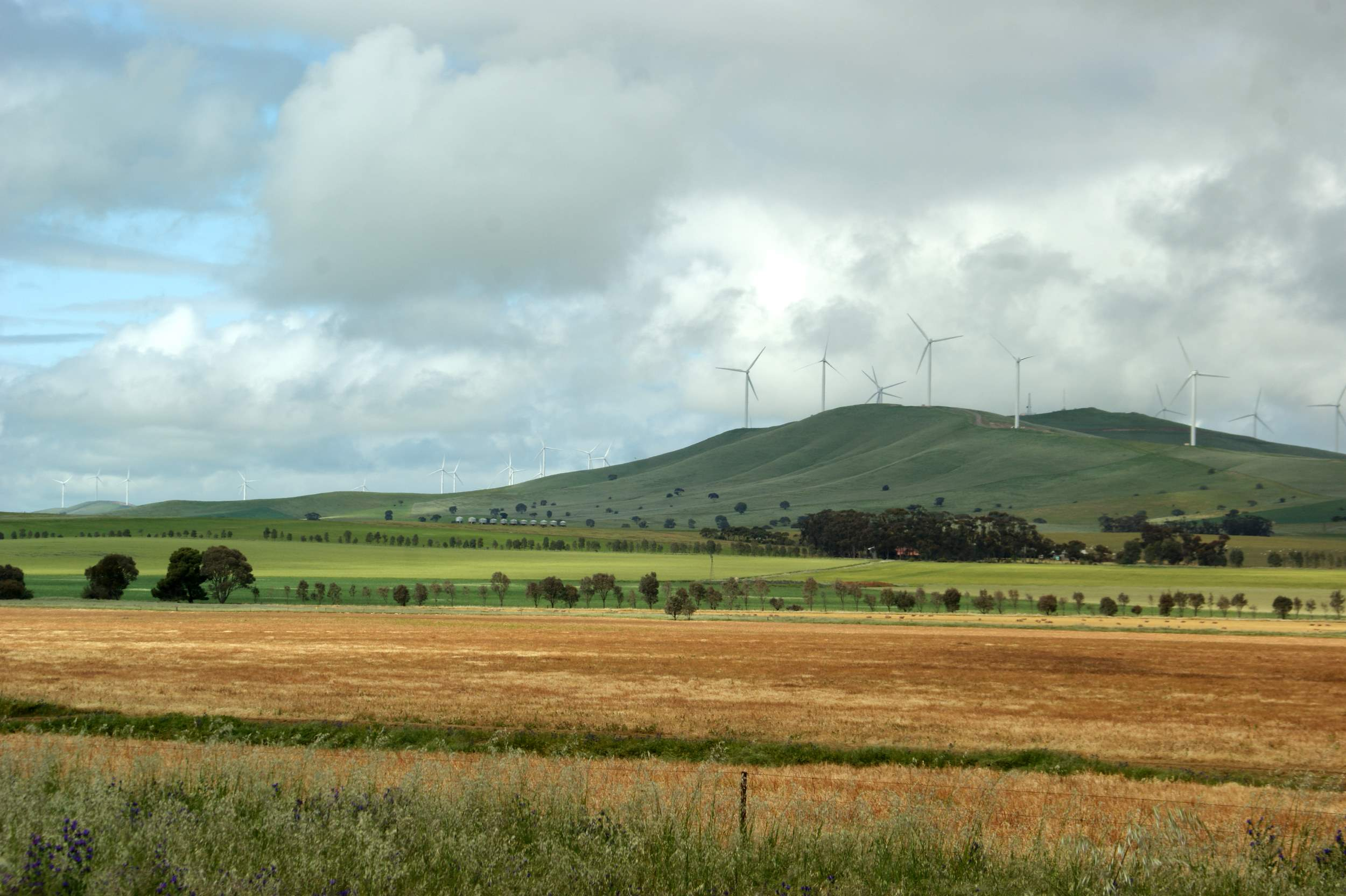
- Country: Australia
- Location: Hallett, South Australia, South Australia
- Coordinates: 33°22′4″S 138°43′43″E
- Status: Operational
- Commission date: 2008
- Owner: AGL Energy
- Operator: AGL Energy

Wind farm
- Type: Onshore

Power generation
- Make and model: 166x Suzlon S88, 1x Suzlon S97
- Nameplate capacity: 351 MW

External links
- Website: www.agl.com.au/about-agl/how-we-source-energy/renewable-energy/hallett-wind-farm

The Hallett Wind Farm is the collective name for four wind farms near the town of Hallett, South Australia. They are owned and operated by AGL Energy.

- Brown Hill (Hallett 1): 95MW, completed June 2008
- Hallett Hill (Hallett 2): 71MW, completed September 2009
- North Brown Hill (Hallett 4): 132MW, completed December 2010
- Bluff Range (Hallett 5): 53MW, completed December 2011

The Mount Bryan wind farm which would have been Hallett 3 was never built. It received planning approval in 2009 but the project was cancelled and the permit was revoked in 2012 following appeals in the Environment, Resources and Development Court.

== Brown Hill ==
Brown Hill Wind Farm, also known as Hallett 1, consists of 45 Suzlon S88 turbines each of a rated 2.1 megawatt (MW) for a total of around 95 MW. It is in the Mid-North of South Australia adjacent to the Hallett Power Station, a pre-existing 180 MW gas fired peaking power plant operated by EnergyAustralia. The wind farm construction was carried out by Suzlon Energy Australia Pty. Ltd. This site utilises an innovative rock anchor solution to support the turbines using only one third of the concrete and reinforcement required in traditional foundations.

== Hallett Hill ==
Hallett Hill Wind Farm, also known as Hallett 2 Wind Farm, was completed in late 2009. It consists of 34 Suzlon turbines each 2.1MW, giving an installed capacity of 71.4MW. Up to March 2011 it was averaging a capacity factor of 39%.

In December 2010, AGL identified that under certain wind conditions tones from the wind turbines were audible at the nearest residence. Resonance dampers have since been installed to address this tonality issue with the wind turbines. Noise testing has confirmed that this permanent acoustic treatment has fixed the tonality issue. Turbines have a spread of 10 km N-S, 4 km west of Mount Bryan

== North Brown Hill ==
AGL's North Brown Hill Wind Farm, alternatively called Hallett 4 Wind Farm, has 63 turbines with a total installed capacity of 132MW, and cost A$334 million to build. The first power flowed into the south eastern Australian electricity grid in August 2010 and the project was up to full operation in early 2011. Turbines spread over 14 km of the Brown Hill Ranges near Jamestown

== Bluff Range ==
AGL's Bluff Range Wind Farm, also known as Hallett 5 Wind Farm consists of 25 Suzlon turbines each of 2.1MW for a total of 52.5MW. Total project investment was $120 million. The project was completed in early 2012. Turbines spread 8 kilometres over the Porcupine Range.

== See also ==
- List of wind farms in Australia
- Wind power in South Australia
