= Canunda Wind Farm =

Wind power project in South Australia

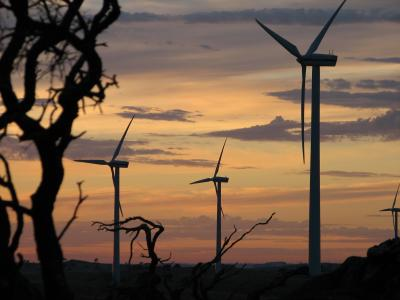
- Canunda wind farm at sunrise
- Country: Australia
- Location: Tantanoola, South Australia
- Coordinates: 37.734°S 140.395°E
- Status: Operational
- Commission date: March 2005
- Construction cost: A$92.5 million
- Owners: GDF Suez Energy Australia 72%, Mitsui 28%

Wind farm
- Type: Onshore
- Site usage: grazing
- Hub height: 67 m (220 ft)
- Rotor diameter: 80 m (262 ft)

Power generation
- Units operational: 23
- Make and model: Vestas
- Nameplate capacity: 46 MW
- Capacity factor: 34

Canunda Wind Farm is an Australian 46 MW wind power farm. It is jointly owned by GDF Suez Energy AustraliaEn 72%) and Mitsui (28%). The wind yield in South Australia enables Canunda to produce electricity at a 34 per cent capacity factor, a high yield by global standards. Canunda Wind Farm was International Power's first wind farm globally. It represents a diversification of the company's energy business in Australia.

== See also ==
- Lake Bonney Wind Farm - Adjoining Wind Farm
- Wind power in South Australia
