= Terminal Storage Mini Hydro =

- Country: Australia
- Location: Hope Valley, South Australia
- Coordinates: 34°50′46.9″S 138°41′10.8″E
- Commission date: October 2003
- Owner: SA Water
- Operator: SA Water

Power generation
- Nameplate capacity: 3 MW
- Annual net output: 4762 MW·h (2012)

Terminal Storage Mini Hydro is the name of an electricity generator operating in the supply pipes for Adelaide's water supply in South Australia. The facility is installed at Tea Tree Gully and uses a stainless steel turbine in the gravity-powered supply pipes. It was developed by SA Water who own and operate the water distribution with experience from Hydro Tasmania. When it was installed, it had a capacity of 1.9 megawatts (2,500 hp). It has been upgraded to now provide 3 megawatts (4,000 hp).

Hydro Tasmania and SA Water are equal partners in the joint venture which opened in October 2003. In 2011–12, it generated 4,762 megawatt-hours (17,140 GJ) of electricity.
