= Lake Bonney Wind Farm =

Wind farm in South Australia

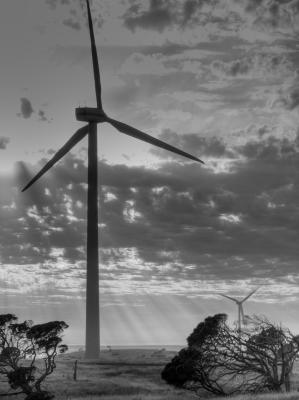
- Early morning at Lake Bonney wind farm
- Country: Australia
- Location: Millicent, South Australia
- Coordinates: 37°45′36″S 140°24′0″E
- Status: Operational
- Commission date: March 2005
- Construction cost: A$700 million
- Owner: Infigen Energy

Wind farm
- Type: Onshore

Power generation
- Units operational: 112
- Make and model: Vestas
- Nameplate capacity: 278.5 MW
- Capacity factor: 34%
- Storage capacity: 52 MW·h

External links
- Website: www.infigenenergy.com/lake-bonney/
- Commons: Related media on Commons

Lake Bonney Wind Farm is a wind farm near Millicent, South Australia, Australia. The wind farm is south of, and contiguous with, Canunda Wind Farm. Both are built along the Woakwine Range - a line of stabilised sand dunes that once were coastal.

The project was built in three stages. Stage 1 comprises 46 turbines each having a rated capacity of 1.75 MW (total 80.5 MW) and was finished in March 2005. Construction of Stage 2 began in November 2006 and was finished around April 2008. Stage 2 comprises 53 turbines of 3 MW (total 159 MW). Stage 3 comprises 13 turbines of 3 MW of total 39 MW). Stage 3 construction commenced in February 2009 and was commissioned in September 2009.

The owner of the Lake Bonney Wind Farm is Infigen Energy, previously known as Babcock and Brown Wind Partners. Wind turbines are serviced under a post-warranty service agreement by the turbine manufacturer Vestas.

== Battery storage ==
It was announced in August 2018 that a battery storage power station would be added to the wind farm to provide firmer commitments to provide electricity, system security and ancillary services to the electricity grid. The project would cost A$38 million to install, including $5 million from the government of South Australia and $5 million from the Australian Renewable Energy Agency (ARENA). The battery is rated at 25 MW and 52 MW·h, and is connected to the Mayurra substation. Like the similar Hornsdale Power Reserve, the battery will operate independently of the wind farm in the electricity market, and connect to the grid at the same point as the wind farm. Construction of the battery was completed in May 2019, and testing began in November 2019. In 2020, its Frequency Control Ancillary Service (FCAS) earned $230,000 per MWh installed. By contrast, arbitrage (buy low, sell high) had earned a third of the battery's build cost by 2024.

== See also ==
- Wind power in Australia
- Wind power in South Australia
