= Dalrymple ESCRI battery =

Battery array in South Australia

- Country: Australia
- Coordinates: 34.936°S 137.744°E
- Status: Operational
- Construction began: October 2017
- Commission date: June 2018
- Owner: ElectraNet
- Operator: AGL Energy

Power generation
- Nameplate capacity: 30 MW
- Storage capacity: 8 MW·h

External links
- Website: dalrymple escri-sa battery project

The Dalrymple ESCRI battery (Energy Storage for Commercial Renewable Integration) is a 30 MW / 8 MW·h grid-connected battery array near Stansbury on Yorke Peninsula in South Australia. Its role is to provide improved reliability and stability to the electricity network on Yorke Peninsula and South Australia.

The battery is installed adjacent to the Dalrymple substation, seven kilometres southwest of Stansbury. Dalrymple substation is at the end of a 275 kV power line into the peninsula. It feeds 33 kV lines to various towns across the lower end of the peninsula and receives electricity generated by the Wattle Point Wind Farm.

The facility is able to store excess generation from Wattle Point Wind Farm as well as a colocated solar farm and is expected to provide a similar service to the Hornsdale Power Reserve in the Mid North of the state.

The battery was constructed by Consolidated Power Projects with ABB and Samsung components. It was part-funded by a grant from the Commonwealth Government through the Australian Renewable Energy Agency (ARENA). It was commissioned in June and July 2018. It provides Frequency Control Ancillary Service (FCAS) to the grid, and also enables the possibility for Yorke Peninsula to operate independently of the wider grid in the event of a system failure. In 2020, its FCAS earned $575,000 per MW installed or $2 million/MWh.

By 2021, the battery had been financially successful enough that ElectraNet returned the $12 million grant funding to ARENA. The installation also provided a model for how to manage the process for registration, licensing and connection. It provides the world's largest autonomous regional microgrid. If the single transmission line to southern Yorke Peninsula is isolated, the ESCRI battery and the Wattle Point Wind Farm create a 100 per cent renewable energy grid.

== See also ==
- List of energy storage projects in South Australia
