= Waterloo Wind Farm =

Wind farm in South Australia

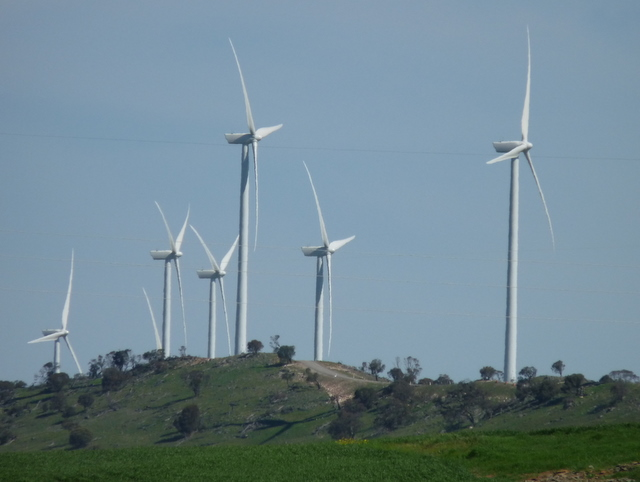
- Turbines in 2010
- Country: Australia
- Location: Waterloo, South Australia
- Coordinates: 33°59′S 138°54′E
- Status: Operational
- Construction began: 2008
- Commission date: November 2010 and November 2016
- Owner: Palisade Investment Partners and Northleaf Capital

Wind farm
- Type: Onshore
- Hub height: 80 metres (262 ft) Vestas V90-3MW; 91.5 metres (300 ft) Vestas V117-3.3MW
- Rotor diameter: 90 metres (295 ft); 117 metres (384 ft)
- Rated wind speed: 15 m/s (49 ft/s)

Power generation
- Units operational: 37 × 3 MW; 6 × 3.3 MW
- Make and model: Vestas V90-3MW; Vestas V117-3.3MW
- Nameplate capacity: 130.8 MW

External links
- Website: http://waterloowindfarm.com.au/
- Commons: Related media on Commons

Waterloo wind farm is east of Manoora, South Australia. Waterloo Wind Farm is owned by Palisade Investment Partners and Northleaf Capital. The site is operated by Palisade Integrated Management Services.

== Site ==
External media

Images
- Generating power at Waterloo Wind Farm

Video
- Waterloo Wind Farm

The wind farm is positioned along a rocky north–south ridge on privately owned property at Waterloo. The 111 megawatt wind farm spreads across five acres of land and cost about $350 million, it began construction in November, 2008 and has been operational since October 2010.

For about two months in 2013, the site was monitored by the Environmental Protection Authority. The wind farm's infrasound and low-frequency noise were both examined. Acoustics firm Resonate conducted noise and meteorological monitoring in the area.

== Turbines ==
Waterloo wind farm opened with 37 Vestas V90-3MW turbines, each 80 metres high, with each turbine blade 44 metres long and weighing about 8 tonnes. The tower sections weigh approximately 90 tonnes in total with the tower and blades combined weighing 125 tonnes. On average the blades turn at 16.2 rpm. There are four levels in a turbine and it takes about five minutes to get to the top.

Each wind turbine produces on average 24 megawatt hours of electricity each day. On a windy day three wind turbines can power the whole of Clare and the whole wind farm can power up to 163,000 homes or 5 to 10% of South Australia.

The wind farm was expanded with six additional Vestas V117 turbines in 2016 at a cost of A$43 million. They have a hub height of 91.5 metres and a rotor diameter of 117 metres, corresponding to a tip height of 152 metres.

== See also ==
- List of wind farms in South Australia
- Wind power in South Australia
