= Port Augusta Renewable Energy Park =

Wind and solar farm in South Australia

- Country: Australia
- Location: South of Port Augusta, South Australia
- Coordinates: 32°34′01″S 137°51′22″E
- Status: Under construction
- Construction began: October 2020
- Construction cost: A$500m ($364m)
- Owners: DP Energy, Iberdrola
- Employees: 20

Solar farm
- Type: Flat-panel PV
- Site resource: 1941 kWh/m2/year (Global horizontal irradiation)

Wind farm
- Type: Onshore
- Hub height: 107 metres (351 ft)
- Rotor diameter: 150 metres (492 ft)
- Site area: 5,400 hectares (54.00 km^{2})

Power generation
- Make and model: Vestas V150
- Units planned: 50 × 4.2 MW
- Units under const.: 50 × 4.2 MW wind turbines, 107 MW solar capacity
- Nameplate capacity: 317 MW
- Capacity factor: 32.4% (expected)
- Annual net output: 900 GWh (expected)

External links
- Website: https://parep.com.au/

The Port Augusta Renewable Energy Park is a combined wind and solar farm under construction south of Port Augusta in South Australia, Australia. The solar farm is planned to be at the northern end of the site, west of the Augusta Highway and south of Sundrop Farms. The wind turbines will be on both sides of the Augusta Highway, extending south as far as the road to Horrocks Pass. Construction formally started in October 2020 and is estimated to take about 18 months to complete. The total site is about 5,400 hectares (13,000 acres).

The project was developed by DP Energy, but prior to construction, Spanish company Iberdrola committed to investing A$500 million and will eventually own stage 1 after DP Energy manages its construction.

What was originally known as "Stage 1" is planned to comprise 210MW of wind generation and 107MW of solar generation. The original "Stage 2" remains owned by DP Energy and is proposed to include more solar photovoltaic generation and a grid connected battery. The developer claims that the combination of wind, solar, battery and synchronous condensers combine to create a renewable energy power station. The former Stage 2 is now called Bluebush Solar.

The wind turbines were originally approved to have a maximum height (to the tip of the blades) of 150 metres (490 ft) but in June 2019, this approval was increased to 185 metres (607 ft). The revised plan raises the hub height to 107.5 metres (353 ft), nominal generating capacity of each turbine to 4.5MW, and reduces the number of turbines from 59 to 50. The wind turbines will be supplied by Vestas and solar components supplied by Downer Group.

Iberdrola announced on 23 September 2021 that the last of the 50 wind turbines had been installed. It would be connected to the grid a few months later.

In October 2021, it was announced that the primary customer for electricity from the facility will be the Olympic Dam mine owned by BHP.
