= Acciona Energía =

Renewable energy company

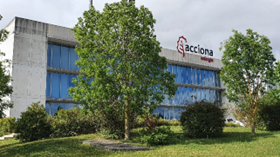
- Company type: Public Limited Company
- Traded as: BMAD: ANE
- ISIN: ES0105563003
- Industry: Energy
- Founded: 2001
- Headquarters: Avenida de Europa, 10 28108, Alcobendas, Spain
- Key people: José Manuel Entrecanales
- Products: renewable energy, energy for self-consumption, 100% renewable energy supply, energy efficiency services, installation and operation of infrastructure for charging electric vehicles and green hydrogen
- Revenue: ▲€2,472 million (2021)
- Operating income: ▲€1,086 million (2021)
- Net income: €363 million (2021): Debt: ▼€1,989 million (2021); Market capitalization : €10,726,984 (2021)
- Number of employees: 1,762 (average, 2021)
- Parent: Acciona
- Website: www.acciona-energia.com

Acciona Energía, a subsidiary of Acciona based in Madrid, is involved in the energy industry: the development and structuring of projects, engineering, construction, supply, operations, maintenance, asset management and management and sales of clean energy.

== History ==
Milestones in its history include the installation in December 1994 of the first commercial wind farm in Spain on the Sierra del Perdón, next to Pamplona, Navarre, by the Energía Hidroeléctrica de Navarra, S.A. company, acquired by ACCIONA in 2003 and 2004, and the KW Tarifa wind farm by the Alabe company, a subsidiary of ACCIONA, in 1995.

In 2009, it acquired more than two GW (gigawatts) of renewable assets as part of the operation agreed with the Enel electric group where ACCIONA stopped participating in Endesa.

Since July 1, 2021, ACCIONA Energía has been listed on the Madrid, Barcelona, Bilbao and Valencia Stock Exchanges, under the ANE ticker, with ACCIONA, S.A. as the primary shareholder as of December 31, 2021.

== Business lines ==
ACCIONA Energía (with the business name of Corporación Acciona Energías Renovables, S.A.) counts with renewable energy assets in five technologies (wind power, solar energy, hydroelectricity, biomass and solar thermal energy) which, as of December 31, 2021, added up to 11.2 gigawatts (GW) of installed capacity. This capacity is distributed between 16 countries in all five continents and in 2021 it produced a total of 24.5 terawatt-hours (TWh) of 100% renewable energy, equivalent to the electric consumption of 7.6 million homes. The company has announced its goals of reaching a total installed capacity of 20 GW by 2025 and of 30 GW by 2030, with new installations primarily for wind power and solar energy.

Besides generating and selling renewable energy, ACCIONA Energía also works in the following industries: energy for self-consumption, energy efficiency services, installation and operation of infrastructure for charging electric vehicles, and green hydrogen industries, focused primarily on corporate and institutional clients.

In 2021, it invested more than 91 million euros in innovation projects. This activity was primarily focused on green hydrogen, offshore wind power, innovative photovoltaic systems, smart bidirectional chargers for electric vehicles, circular economy, life extension of renewable assets, advanced O&M technologies and energy storage, among others.

== International presence ==
ACCIONA Energía counts with an active presence in 25 countries throughout the five continents. The primary geographic areas where it operates, besides Spain, are North America (the United States and Canada), Latin America (Mexico, Chile, Brazil, Peru, Costa Rica, and the Dominican Republic) and Australia. It is also present in Africa, with projects in Egypt and South Africa, as well as in other European countries (Portugal, France, Italy, Poland, Croatia, Ukraine and Hungary).

== See also ==
- Acciona
