= Mount Millar Wind Farm =

Wind farm in South Australia

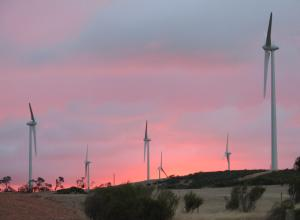
- Mount Millar wind farm at sunset
- Country: Australia
- Location: Eyre Peninsula, South Australia
- Coordinates: 33°37′28″S 136°42′13″E
- Status: Operational
- Construction began: 2004
- Commission date: 28 February 2006
- Construction cost: A$130M
- Owner: Meridian Energy

Wind farm
- Type: Onshore
- Hub height: 85 metres (279 ft)
- Rotor diameter: 70 metres (230 ft)

Power generation
- Units operational: 35
- Make and model: Enercon E70
- Nameplate capacity: 70 MW

External links
- Website: www.meridianenergy.co.nz
- Commons: Related media on Commons

The Mount Millar Wind Farm on the Eyre Peninsula in South Australia.

The Mount Millar Wind Farm was the first wind farm in South Australia to use direct drive turbines that don't have gear boxes. It is connected to aElectraNet transmission network at Yadnarie Substation.

Construction of this wind farm started in late 2004 and was completed in December 2005. Power production started in February 2006. The $130 million project was developed by Tarong Energy and in 2007 sold to Transfield Services. In 2010 it was purchased by Meridian Energy.

== See also ==
- Wind power in South Australia
