= Cathedral Rocks Wind Farm =

- Country: Australia
- Location: Lower Eyre Peninsula, South Australia
- Coordinates: 34°51′S 135°35′E
- Status: Operational
- Construction began: 2004
- Commission date: 2007
- Owners: EnergyAustralia and Acciona
- Operator: Acciona Energía

Wind farm
- Type: Onshore
- Site usage: farmland
- Hub height: 60
- Rotor diameter: 80
- Site area: 29 square kilometres (11 sq mi)

Power generation
- Units operational: 33
- Make and model: Vestas
- Nameplate capacity: 66 MW

External links
- Website: www.energyaustralia.com.au/about-us/energy-generation/cathedral-rocks-wind-farm

Cathedral Rocks Wind Farm is a wind power station located about 30 km west of Port Lincoln in South Australia, near the southern tip of the Eyre Peninsula. It has 33 wind turbines of 2 MW each, with a combined generating capacity of 66 MW of electricity. The site covers an area of about 29 km^{2}, with a coastal exposure of nearly 11 km and is private farming land. The wind farm was commissioned in September 2005.

Before the wind farm was built, extensive environmental and cultural studies were conducted. Surveys undertaken included the assessment of potential impacts to Aboriginal and European cultural heritage, flora, visual amenity, noise levels, birds and other animals. Construction of the wind farm was undertaken with consideration for the environment.

Construction started in 2004, and the first turbines were commissioned in late 2005. The wind farm was fully operational by 2007. It is operated by a joint venture between EnergyAustralia and Acciona Energy.

== See also ==
- Wind power in South Australia
