= Lincoln Gap, South Australia =

Lincoln Gap South Australia
- Coordinates: 32.56°S 137.59°E
- Population: 17 (SAL 2016)
- Postcode(s): 5715
- LGA(s): Unincorporated area; City of Port Augusta
- State electorate(s): Giles; Stuart
- Federal division(s): Grey
Localities around Lincoln Gap:
Illeroo	Carriewerloo	Port Augusta West
Pandurra	Lincoln Gap
	Cultana

Lincoln Gap is a locality in the northeastern corner of Eyre Peninsula, South Australia. It is named after a gap between steep-sided hills. The Whyalla railway line and Eyre Highway pass through the gap. The Lincoln Highway branches from the Eyre Highway southwest of the gap, also within the bounds of the locality.

The formal boundaries of the locality were created on 26 April 2013 and adjusted on 25 September 2014, however the locality had been known as Lincoln Gap for much longer. The northeastern part of the bounded locality is included in the City of Port Augusta local government area, and the state electoral district of Stuart. The majority of the locality is in the electoral district of Giles, and is not incorporated under any local government.

The Lincoln Gap Wind Farm is under construction on the hills around Lincoln Gap. The wind farm substation was connected to the national electricity grid on 25 February 2019. The energy storage battery was expected to be installed by the end of May 2019, with wind turbines commissioned from August 2019.
