= Wattle Point Wind Farm =

Wind farm in South Australia

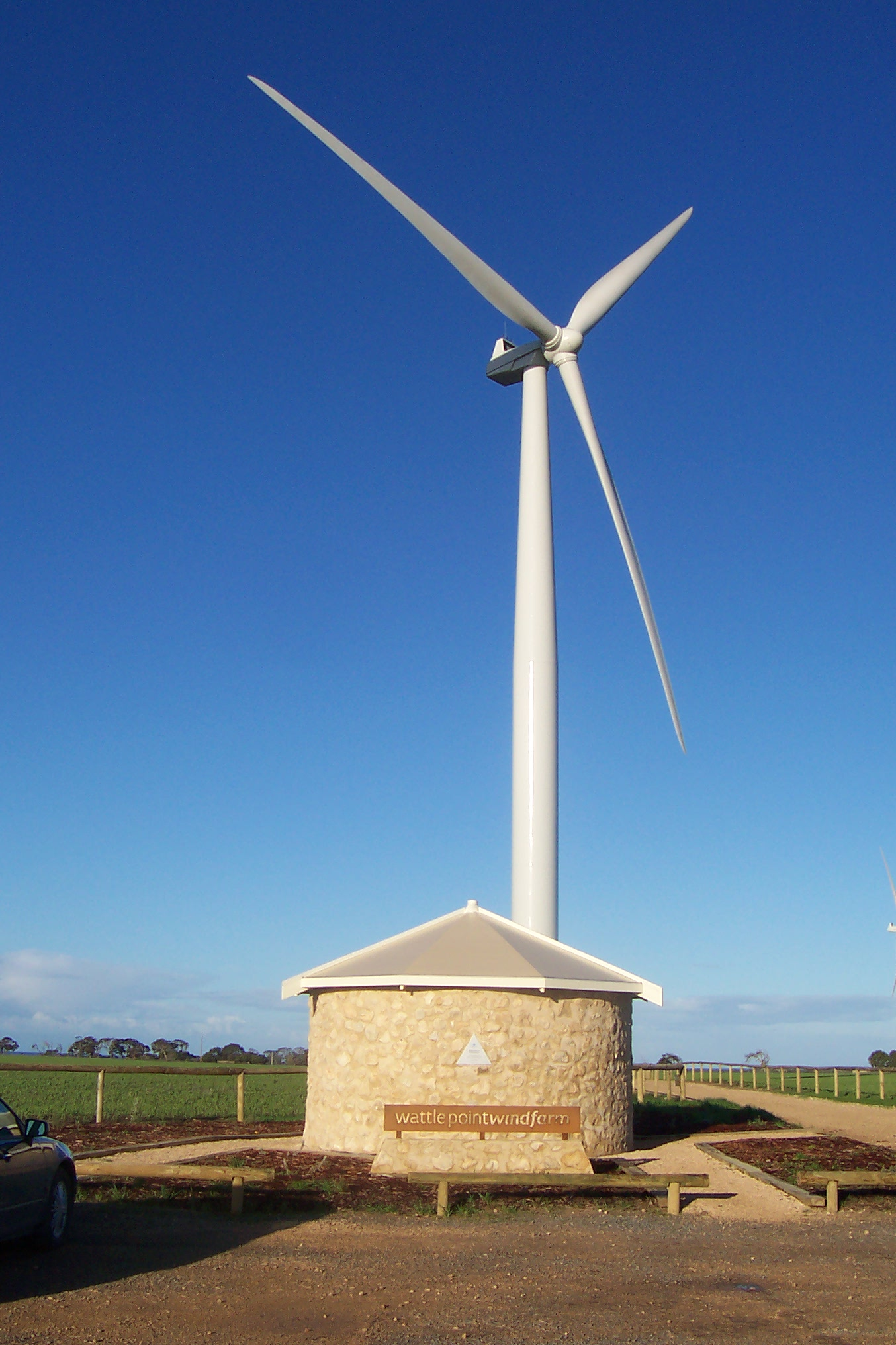
- The information centre near the base of one of the towers.
- Country: Australia
- Location: Edithburgh, South Australia
- Coordinates: 35°7′21″S 137°42′55″E
- Status: Operational
- Construction began: July 2004
- Commission date: April 2005
- Construction cost: $180 million (AUD)
- Operator: AGL Energy

Wind farm
- Type: Onshore
- Hub height: 68
- Rotor diameter: 82
- Site area: 17.5 square kilometres (6.8 sq mi)

Power generation
- Units operational: 55
- Make and model: Vestas V82-1.65 MW (55)
- Nameplate capacity: 91 MW

External links
- Website: www.agl.com.au/about-agl/how-we-source-energy/renewable-energy/wattle-point-wind-farm
- Commons: Related media on Commons

Wattle Point Wind Farm is a wind farm near Edithburgh on the Yorke Peninsula in South Australia, which has been operating since April 2005. When it was officially opened in June of that year it was Australia's largest wind farm at 91 megawatts (122,000 hp). The installation consists of 55 wind turbines covering 17.5 square kilometres (6.8 sq mi)and was built at a cost of 180 million Australian dollars. It is connected to ETSA Utilities electricity transmission system via a 132 kilovolt line.

The location was chosen after identification as having one of mainland Australia's highest average wind speeds. The wind farm was officially opened by South Australian Premier Mike Rann and Southern Hydro Chairman, Dr Keith Turner. The opening was opposed by some of the local Indigenous Australians, the Adjahdura (or Narungga). A descendant of the traditional landowners argued that construction desecrated an ancient burial ground, disturbing skeletons in the construction of turbine number four. Work was halted in late 2004 after the discovery of human remains, artefacts and tools. The Aboriginal Affairs Department, and the developers, separately commissioned archaeological reports resulting in the development allowed to proceed with five towers being repositioned. Both reports concluded that the bones had come from elsewhere on the peninsula, being later reburied at Wattle Point. The region's aboriginal community was divided on construction; Narungga National Aboriginal Corporation supporting development and the Narungga Heritage Committee strongly opposing.

Wattle Point Wind Farm was built and owned by Southern Hydro Pty Limited. Southern Hydro was owned by Meridian Energy of New Zealand until October 2005, when it was bought by the Australian Gas Light Company (AGL). The windfarm was acquired by Alinta in October 2006, as part of an asset merger with AGL, and subsequently by the ANZ Bank's Energy Infrastructure Trust, for 225 million dollars on 23 April 2007.

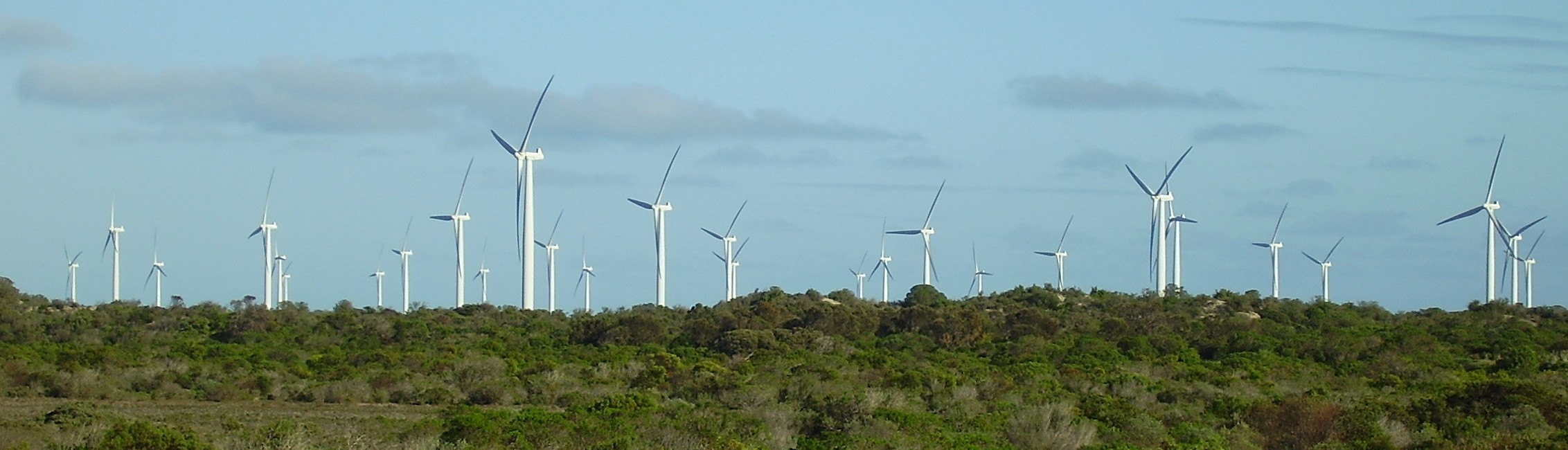
The windfarm from the edge of Edithburgh

The District Council of Yorke Peninsula approved a second wind farm, Wattle Point Stage 2. However it did not proceed due to insufficient capacity in the electrical transmission lines.

The facility is closely connected to the Dalrymple ESCRI battery, a 30-megawatt battery storage facility at Dalrymple substation about 21 kilometres (13 mi) to the north.

== See also ==
- Wind power in South Australia
