= Willogoleche Wind Farm =

Wind farm in South Australia

- Country: Australia
- Location: west of Hallett, South Australia
- Coordinates: 33.393°S 138.848°E
- Status: Operational
- Construction began: 2017
- Commission date: 2019
- Construction cost: A$250 million
- Owner: Engie

Wind farm
- Type: Onshore
- Site usage: Grazing
- Hub height: 85 m
- Rotor diameter: 130 m
- Rated wind speed: 8.6 metres per second (28 ft/s)

Power generation
- Units operational: 24 @ 3.83MW; 8 @ 3.43MW
- Make and model: General Electric
- Nameplate capacity: 119 MW

External links
- Website: engie.com.au/home/what-we-do/our-assets/willogoleche/

The Willogoleche Wind Farm is a wind farm in the vicinity of Hallett in the Mid North region of South Australia. It generates up to 119 MW of electricity. There are 32 turbines in the wind farm. The closest to the town of Hallett is 3.2 km west of the town, and the furthest is 8.3 km southwest of the town. It was officially opened on 30 July 2019. The electricity generated is sold by Engie's retail brand Simply Energy.

The Australian Energy Market Operator expected the wind farm to start providing electricity to the grid from Winter 2018. A generation licence was issued on 20 June 2018 for 32 turbines to generate up to 122.56MW. The Willogoleche Wind Farm in Hallet, South Australia officially opened in July 2019.
