= Clements Gap Wind Farm =

Wind farm in South Australia

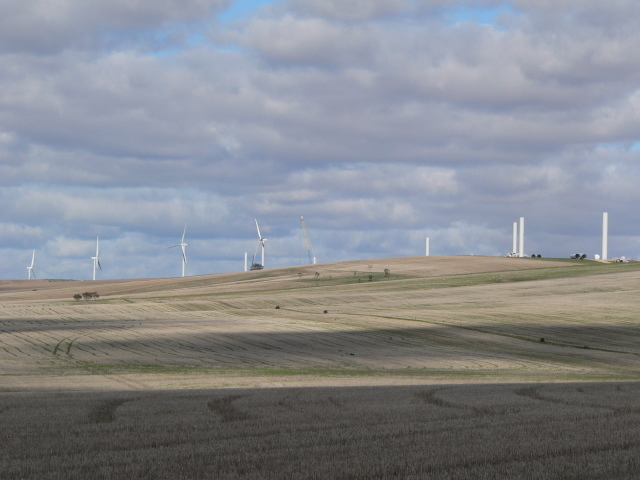
- Clements Gap Wind Farm under construction in 2009
- Country: Australia
- Location: Clements Gap, South Australia
- Coordinates: 33.4809°S 138.0987°E
- Status: Operational
- Commission date: February 2010
- Owner: Pacific Blue

Wind farm
- Type: Onshore
- Site usage: cropping and grazing

Power generation
- Units operational: 26
- Units decommissioned: 1
- Nameplate capacity: 57 MW

External links
- Website: https://www.pacificblue.com.au/our-energy-production/operating-sites/clements-gap-wind-farm

Clements Gap Wind Farm is a wind farm operated by Pacific Blue. It opened in 2010 located in the Barunga Range, South Australia near Clements Gap, some 20 minutes south of Port Pirie.

The wind farm consists of 26 wind turbines with a total generating capacity of 57 MW. It provides enough electricity for up to 33,000 homes and is estimated to avoid the emission of 150,000 tonnes of greenhouse gases each year. A 27th wind turbine was destroyed by fire in February 2024. A 60 MW 2-hour battery is being added.

The Clements Gap site was chosen because of its powerful winds, easy construction access, simple grid connection, and strong community support.
