= Goyder South Wind Farm =

Wind farm under construction in South Australia

- Country: Australia
- Coordinates: 33°45′S 138°55′E
- Owner: Neoen

Wind farm
- Type: Onshore
- Rotor diameter: 158 m (518 ft)

Power generation
- Units under const.: 75 × 5.5 MW
- Nameplate capacity: 412 MW

External links
- Website: goyderenergy.com.au

Goyder South Wind Farm is the first part of Neoen's Goyder Renewables Zone development near Burra, South Australia. The Goyder South Wind Farm will be on the hills south-east of the town of Burra.

Early construction works for Stage 1 began in December 2021. The project is owned by Neoen and the construction contract was awarded to a consortium of GE Renewable Energy and Elecnor.

Generation capacity of Stage 1 is anticipated to be 412MW. The Government of the Australian Capital Territory has signed a 14-year contract for 100MW of electricity from the first phase of Stage 1, and BHP signed a 70 MW baseload renewables contract for phase 2 to power its Olympic Dam mine. Neoen’s 238.5 MW / 477 MWh Blyth Battery in South Australia will balance power for the mine. Goyder South Stage 1 consists of 75 GE 5.5-158 Cypress wind turbines, with a new transmission line to connect to the Robertstown substation. First power came online in April 2024, and the facility was fully operational in late 2025.

Neoen gave 1,000 hectares at World’s End Gorge to the South Australian government in 2023, paving the way for a new national park along with the Hopkins Creek Conservation Park in Ngadjuri country.

The 238.5 MW / 477 MWh Blyth grid battery operates in 2025 to balance power for the mine.

The Goyder South Wind Farm replaced the 119 MW Stony Gap Wind Farm which had initially been proposed for the same area, originally by EnergyAustralia who sold it to Palisade Investment Partners in 2017 before Neoen bought the proposal in September 2019 and included it in the larger plan for Goyder Renewables Zone. Goyder wind farm(s) was sold to Brookfield in 2024.

The 600 MW Goyder North wind farm with a 226 MW / 866 MWh MWh battery is planned for the north side of the Goyder Highway, and construction of the battery started in late 2025.
