= Lincoln Gap Wind Farm =

Wind farm in South Australia

- Country: Australia
- Location: 15 km west of Port Augusta on the Eyre Highway at Lincoln Gap, Eyre Peninsula, South Australia
- Coordinates: 32.619°S 137.580°E
- Status: Under construction
- Construction began: 2017
- Commission date: Expected mid-2019
- Construction cost: A$300M (stage 1); A$170M (stage 2)
- Owner: Nexif Energy Australia

Wind farm
- Type: Onshore
- Hub height: 110 metres (361 ft)
- Rotor diameter: 136 metres (446 ft); 140 metres (459 ft)
- Rated wind speed: 11 m/s (36 ft/s)

Power generation
- Units operational: 35 × 3.6 MW Senvion (Stage 1); 24 × 3.6 MW Vestas
- Make and model: Senvion 3.6M140 EBC; Vestas V136
- Units planned: 42 × 6 MW
- Nameplate capacity: 212 MW
- Capacity factor: 43%
- Annual net output: 800 GW·h
- Storage capacity: 10 MW·h

External links
- Website: lincolngapwindfarm.com.au

The Lincoln Gap Wind Farm is a wind farm in the vicinity of Lincoln Gap on northeastern Eyre Peninsula in South Australia, Australia. It consists of 59 wind turbines and generates a total of 212 MW of electricity. Construction began in late 2017 and was initially expected to be commissioned in late 2018. Construction was delayed in July 2018 when unexploded ordnance was discovered on the site, left from historic military testing. The site is not far from the Cultana Training Area.

Following Senvion's European parent company commencing insolvency proceedings, Vestas was engaged to provide maintenance services for the 126 MW first stage, and the 24 3.6 MW turbines for the second stage. The 212 MW wind farm reached full generation capacity in late April 2022.

== Construction and commissioning ==
The wind farm was constructed by Senvion in two stages. The first stage was 35 turbines. In December 2018, it was expected to be operational by July 2019. Stage Two for the final 24 turbines received financial approval from Nexif Energy in December 2018. A 10 MW / 10 MW·h battery was expected to be completed in May 2019 by Fluence, with a proposal to later upgrade it to 30 MW. The output is contracted to retailer ERM Power. Some of the towers and turbines were erected using a tower crane similar to what is used to construct high-rise buildings.

The wind farm substation was connected to the national electricity grid on 25 February 2019. The energy storage battery was expected to be installed by the end of May 2019, with wind turbines commissioned from August 2019. The first turbine exported electricity to the grid in the last few days of April 2019.

It was reported in October 2020 that construction of Stage 2 had begun, at a cost of A$170m. It was completed and reached full operation (without the battery) in late April 2022.
