= Iberdrola Australia =

Electric power company in Australia

Iberdrola Australia Limited
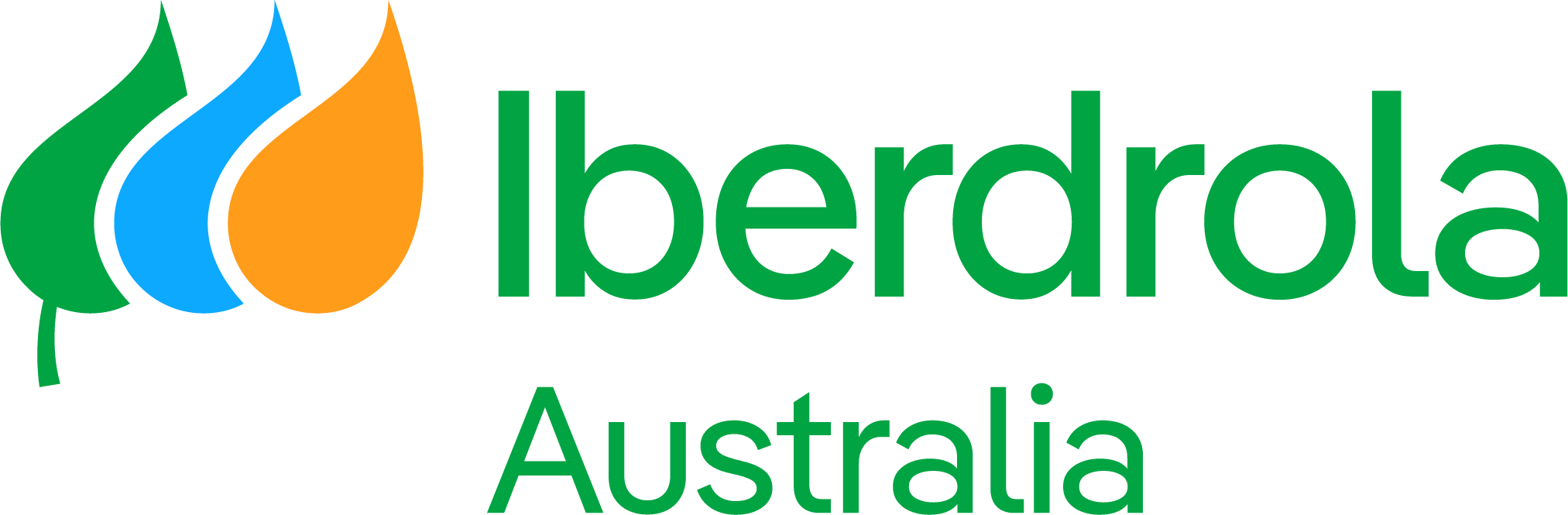
- Type: Sociedad Anónima
- Industry: Energy
- Founded: 11 June 2003
- Headquarters: Australia
- Area served: Australia
- Products: Electricity
- Website: Iberdrola Australia

Iberdrola Australia (former Infigen Energy) is a developer, owner and operator of renewable energy generation assets in Australia. The head office is located in Sydney, NSW, with other offices also located in Melbourne, VIC, and Brisbane, QLD. Iberdrola Australia (previously Infigen Energy) became a subsidiary of Iberdrola S.A. in 2020.

Iberdrola Australia’s fleet of renewable energy assets is among the largest in Australia. As of May 2024, Iberdrola Australia had a total capacity of 2.4GW. The company’s customers are located in New South Wales, Victoria, Queensland, and South Australia in the National Electricity Market, and Western Australia in the South West Interconnected System.

== History ==
Prior to its acquisition in 2020 by Spanish company Iberdrola, S.A., Iberdrola Australia operated as Infigen Energy (Infigen).

Infigen listed on the Australian Securities Exchange (ASX) in October 2005 under the code BBW. When it joined the ASX, its portfolio comprised three wind farms with an installed capacity of approximately 150 megawatts. By 2007, Infigen’s portfolio grew to 33 wind farms with an installed capacity of 1,200 megawatts. As of 2007, it was the world's fourth largest owner of wind farms and are Australia's biggest wind power supplier.

In 2009, Infigen changed its name from Babcock & Brown Wind Partners after branching out from troubled parent company Babcock & Brown. ASX code IFN.

In 2012, Infigen hosted its first fun run event, called “Run with the Wind”, at its Woodlawn Wind Farm. The company’s second fun run in the following year was supported by the Greater Western Sydney Giants. Both races were won by Olympian runner Martin Dent, and proceeds were donated to charity. Infigen hosted the fun run in the following years in 2014, 2015, 2016 and 2017 and 2018.

In 2013, the company collaborated with Danish wind turbines manufacturer Vestas on the wind energy campaign "Act on Facts".

In 2015, Infigen joined the Carbon Disclosure Project’s Road to Paris climate commitments, also known as the We Mean Business coalition. In the same year, Infigen joined Australia’s CItySwitch Green Office program which was a partnership between businesses and local, state and federal governments working together to make a positive impact on climate change.

In 2015, Infigen joined the Carbon Disclosure Project's Road to Paris climate commitments, also known as the We Mean Business coalition. In the same year Infigen joined Australia's CitySwitch Green Office program, which is a partnership between businesses and local, state and federal governments working together to make a positive impact on climate change.

After the company’s annual general meeting on 17 November 2016, it was announced that Miles George, that managing director and CEO, would retire and Ross Rolfe would be appointed his successor. Miles George had been the managing director and CEO of Infigen since 2009.

In 2017, Infigen announced the retirement of Mike Hutchinson as chairman of the board and appointment of non-executive director Len Gill in succession to Mr Hutchinson as chairman of the board.

In June 2020 Credit Suisse launched an after-market takeover bid on Infigen Energy on behalf of UAC Energy. A competing takeover offer was launched by Iberdrola. The Iberdrola offer was ultimately successful, with UAC selling its stake to Iberdrola on 9 September 2020.

The brand transition from Infigen to Iberdrola Australia was announced in June 2020, and took place in December 2020. On 1 June 2021, Infigen Energy was renamed Iberdrola Australia.

In October 2025, Iberdrola announced that Paul Simshauser would take on the role of new Chief Executive Officer (CEO) for Iberdrola Australia, succeeding Ross Rolfe, who will remain in the company as chairman.

== Operations ==
Iberdrola Australia’s portfolio comprises wind and solar farms, batteries and fast-start firming assets. All of the company’s wind farms are accredited by GreenPower.

Wind farms*

Wind Farm	Installed Capacity (MW)	State	Commercial Operation Date
Lake Bonney 1	81	SA	March 2005
Walkaway	89	WA	July 2006
Lake Bonney 2	159	SA	September 2008
Capital	141	NSW	January 2010
Lake Bonney 3	39	SA	July 2010
Woodlawn	48	NSW	October 2011
Bodangora	113	NSW	February 2019
Port Augusta Renewable Energy Park (PAREP)*	210	SA	September 2022
Flyers Creek	145	NSW	September 2024

*PAREP is a hybrid wind and solar farm

Solar farms

Granjas Solares	Installed Capacity (MW)	State	Commercial Operation Date
PAREP	107	SA	September 2022
Avonlie	245	NSW	August 2023
Broadsound	376	QLD	Under construction

Contracted Renewable Energy Assets

Activo de Energía Renovable Contratado	Installed Capacity (MW)	State	Contract Start Date
Cherry Tree	58	VIC	December 2018
Collector	136^	NSW	March 2020

Firming Assets

Firming Asset	Installed Capacity (MW)	State	Acquisition/Commercial Operation Date
Smithfield	123	NSW	Acquired May 2019
Lake Bonney	25	SA	December 2019
Bolivar^^	120	SA	February 2023
Wallgrove^^	50	NSW	October 2021
Broadsound	180	QLD	Under construction

^^Long-term lease

== Sustainability Initiatives ==
Iberdrola Australia published its 2023 Sustainability Report in June 2024. It was the company’s first annual sustainability report as part of Iberdrola S.A.

The company aims to achieve net zero carbon emissions by 2040 and net positive biodiversity by 2030.

Iberdrola Australia is a signatory to Caring for Climate, UN Global Compact.
