= Electricity sector in Australia =

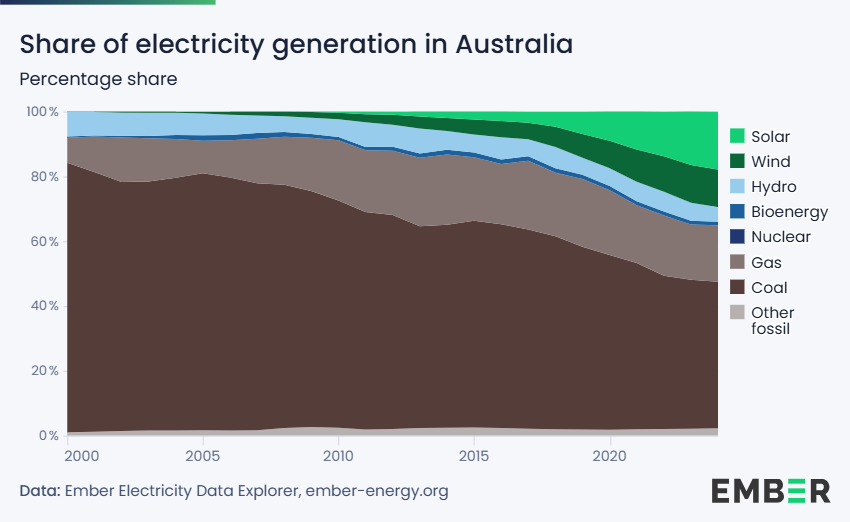
Share of electricity generation in Australia - percentage share

The electricity sector in Australia has been historically dominated by coal-fired power stations, but renewable fuels are forming a rapidly growing fraction of supply. In 2024, Australia's electricity production reached 265 TWh, with coal accounting for 52% and natural gas for 7.6%. Renewable sources, comprising solar, wind, hydro, and bioenergy with waste, collectively made up 40% of the total electricity generation mix.

Due to its large size and the location of its population, Australia lacks a single grid that covers all states, but has a transmission grid that extends along the east coast from Queensland via New South Wales and Victoria to South Australia and also connects via the Basslink submarine DC cable with Tasmania.

Since 2005, wind power and rooftop solar have led to a fast growing share of renewable energy in total electricity generation. Generation from renewable sources reached a share of 32.5 per cent in 2021, an increase from 16.9 per cent in 2017.

The Australian Government is advancing various reforms through its Powering Australia plan, with a goal for renewables to constitute 82% of the national electricity mix by 2030. This initiative is a key part of the government's broader strategy to lower emissions by 43% from 2005 levels by 2030, aiming for net zero emissions by 2050.

== Statistical summary ==
Percentage of electricity generation and capacity by fuel source in the National Electricity Market
Year	Coal		Gas		Hydro		Wind		Solar	
Year	Capacity	Generation	Capacity	Generation	Capacity	Generation	Capacity	Generation	Capacity	Generation
2009–10	58%	81%	21%	10%	16%	6%	3%	2%	–	–
2010–11	56%	78%	21%	12%	16%	8%	4%	3%	–	–
2011–12	57%	79%	21%	11%	16%	7%	4%	3%	3%	0.9%
2012–13	55%	75%	20%	12%	17%	9%	5.4%	3.4%	5.6%	1.3%
2013–14	53%	74%	21%	12%	16%	9%	6.3%	4.1%	6.4%	2%
2014–15	54%	76%	20%	12%	16%	7%	6.6%	4.9%	8%	2.7%
2015–16	52%	76%	19%	7%	17%	10%	7.5%	6.1%	9%	3%
2017–18	40.9%	72.3%	21.3%	9.5%	14.3%	7.4%	9.1%	6.4%	12.8%	3.8%
2019	37.3%	68.1%	16.1%	8.7%	13.2%	6.7%	10.0%	8.2%	20.0%	7.7%
2020	34.2%	65.9%	14.5%	7.1%	12.4%	7.1%	11.3%	9.7%	24.8%	9.7%
2021	31.8%	62.8%	13.5%	5.5%	11.5%	7.8%	11.4%	11.3%	28.2%	12.3%
2022	27.0%	58.3%	13.5%	6.3%	9.8%	8.0%	12.4%	12.5%	34.4%	14.4%

Notes
Percentages of installed capacity and electricity generation, "other dispatched" not included.

Electricity generation by fuel source in the National Electricity Market (TWh)
Year	Black coal	Brown coal	Natural gas	Hydro	Wind	Solar	Sum
2006	121.8	56.1	12.7	14.9	1.1	0.0	206.6
2007	120.5	55.2	19.4	13.2	1.5	0.0	209.7
2008	123.1	56.1	17.9	11.7	2.4	0.0	211.2
2009	116.9	56.3	19.3	12.3	3.8	0.0	208.7
2010	108.7	55.9	23.6	15.8	4.8	0.2	208.6
2011	108.4	54.6	23.0	13.4	5.7	0.7	205.8
2012	102.7	50.8	24.5	16.0	6.4	1.7	202.0
2013	98.6	47.3	22.6	18.6	8.0	3.0	198.0
2014	96.1	49.2	25.0	13.9	8.5	4.0	196.7
2015	100.9	50.6	19.9	13.4	10.0	5.2	200.0
2016	104.1	47.0	16.2	17.1	11.2	6.6	202.1
2017	110.0	38.3	21.4	12.9	11.4	7.4	201.4
2018	110.3	36.0	15.5	16.7	14.3	10.0	202.9
2019	106.8	33.3	18.0	13.7	16.9	15.8	204.5
2020	99.7	34.2	14.4	14.3	19.6	19.7	203.1
2021	94.4	33.5	11.1	15.8	22.9	25.0	203.9
2022	89.5	32.0	13.2	16.6	25.9	30.1	208.4

Notes
"Solar" includes rooftop solar and solar farms. "Other dispatched" (max 1.2 TWh) and "battery storage" (max 70 GWh) are not included.

== Electricity supply ==
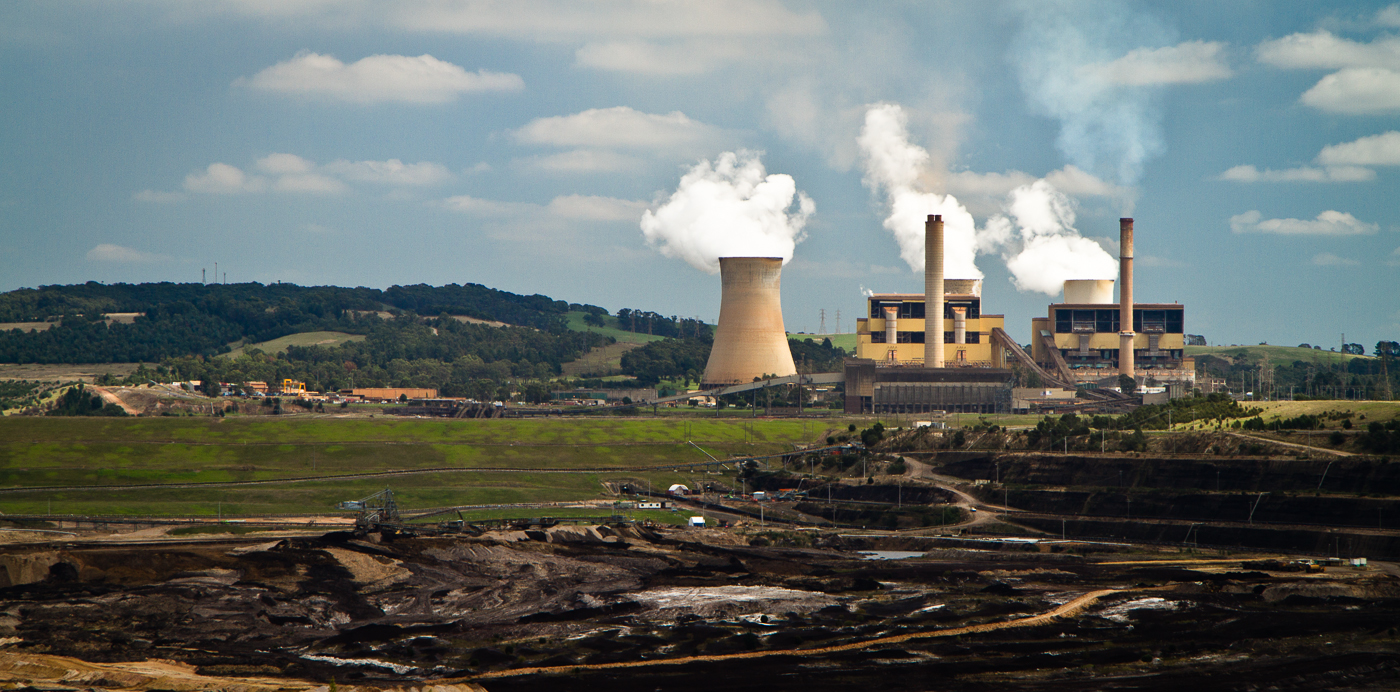
Yallourn Power Station with brown coal mine in the front, 2012

As of 2011, electricity producers in Australia were not building gas-fired power stations, while the four major banks were unwilling to make loans for coal-fired power stations, according to EnergyAustralia (formerly TRUenergy). In 2014, an oversupply of generation was expected to persist until 2024. However, a report published in 2017 by the Australian Energy Market Operator projected that energy supply in 2018 and 2019 is expected to meet demands, with a risk of supply falling short at peak demand times.

From 2003 to 2013 real electric prices for households increased by an average of 72%. Much of this increase in price has been attributed to over-investment in increasing distribution networks and capacity, and environmental policy impacts. Further price increases are predicted to be moderate over the next few years (2017 on) due to changes in the regulation of transmission and distribution networks as well as increased competition in electricity wholesale markets as supply and demand merge.

Between 2010 and 2021, total electricity generation increased by 5% to 265 TWh, with coal contributing 53% and natural gas 19%, while renewables accounted for 27%. The incremental demand for power since 2000 has been met entirely by renewables, with a 22% reduction in coal-generated electricity due to an increase in solar and wind power, driven by subsidies and falling costs. Solar energy saw an annual growth rate of 56%, with wind energy at 16% over the same time period. Notably, approximately 30% of Australian households have installed solar photovoltaic (PV) systems, representing the highest adoption rate worldwide.

== Privatisation ==
Since the 1990s the electricity sector in Australia has seen a wave of privatisation. First in South Australia in 1999, then in Victoria in the late 1990s, then in New South Wales in the early 2010s.

In 2006, the Queensland Government announced plans to privatise the retail arm of Energex and its Allgas distribution network.

== Renewables ==
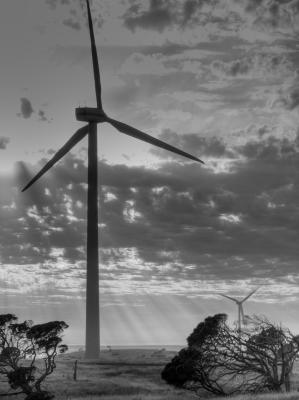
Early morning at the 239 MW Lake Bonney Wind Farm.

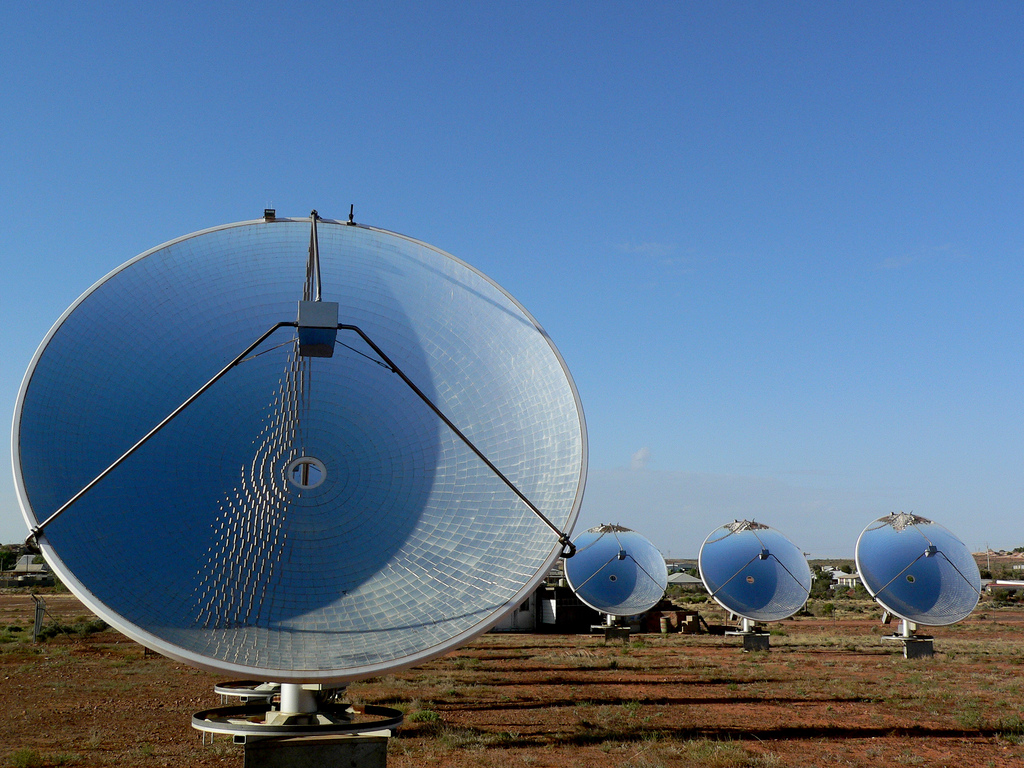
White Cliffs Solar Power Station, New South Wales

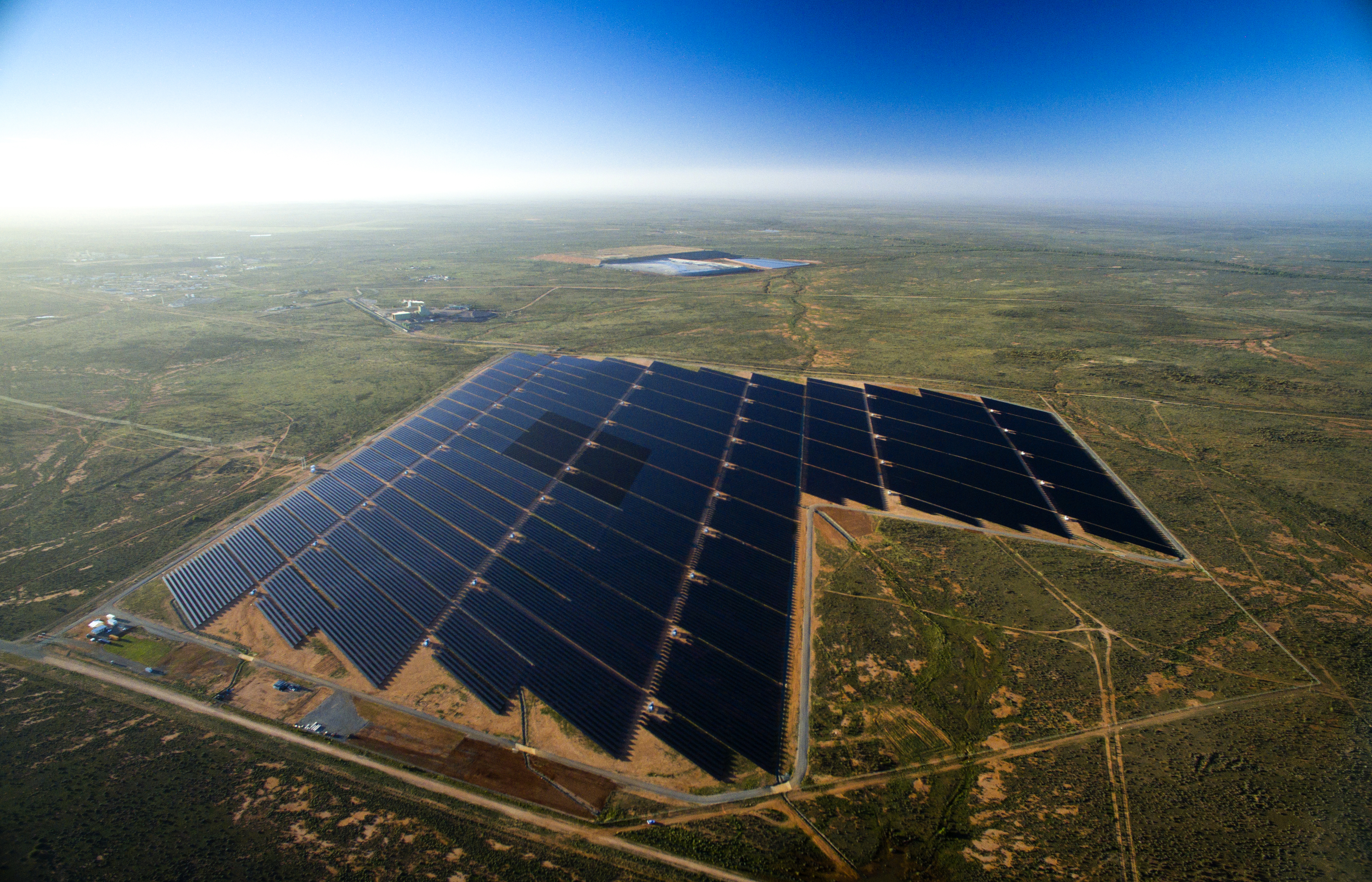
Broken Hill solar plant, New South Wales

Australian renewable electricity generation (gigawatt-hours), 2021
Source	Generation (GWh)
Wind	26,804
Small solar	18,607
Hydro	16,128
Large solar	9,167
Bioenergy	3,187
Medium solar	787

Renewable energy has potential in Australia, and the Climate Change Authority is reviewing the 20-percent Renewable Energy Target (RET). The production of 50 megawatts of wind power (power for nearly 21,000 homes annually) creates about 50 construction jobs and five staff positions. Renewable energy in Australia includes wind power, hydroelectricity, solar PV, heat pumps, geothermal, wave and solar thermal energy. In recent years, wind and solar power have been the fastest growing source of energy in Australia.

Renewable electricity in Australia is available from a number of green energy suppliers that supply electricity from environmentally friendly energy sources that are renewable and non-polluting. The growth and development of the green energy industry was tracked in Australia by the ALTEX-Australia alternative energy index from 2006 to 2011.

Australia renewable electricity production by source

In 2021, Australia produced 74,679 gigawatt-hours of renewable energy, which accounted for 32.5% of electricity production, which represented an increase of almost 5 percentage points compared to 2020. In the five years prior, the proportion of Australia's electricity that comes from renewables has almost doubled, increasing from 16.9 per cent in 2017 to 32.5 per cent in 2021.

In Australia renewable energy is accredited under the GreenPower scheme whereby all distributors are government audited bi-annually to ensure that customers are getting exactly what is described in their purchased products. In the 2009 settlement period there were 904,716 GreenPower customers Australia-wide, accounting for a total of 2,194,934 MWh of electricity generation, a 10% increase over 2008. This total electricity provision was divided between residential customers who purchased 1,001,195 MWh, and business customers who purchased 1,193,739 MWh. The largest nationwide distributors were EnergyAustralia, Origin Energy and TRUenergy.

By the 2014 settlement period the number of GreenPower customers Australia-wide was at 497,406, and total purchases accounted for 1,279,281 MWh.

=== Solar ===
Solar power in Australia is a growing industry. As of December 2017, Australia had over 7,024 MW of installed photovoltaic (PV) solar power, of which 1,190 MW were installed in the preceding 12 months. In 2017, 23 solar PV projects with a combined installed capacity of 2,034 MW were either under construction, constructed or due to start construction having reached financial closure. PV accounted for 2.4% of Australia's electrical energy production in 2014/15.

Feed-in tariffs and renewable energy targets designed to assist renewable energy commercialisation in Australia have largely been responsible for the rapid increase. In South Australia, a solar feed-in tariff was introduced for households and an educational program that involved installing PVs on the roofs of major public buildings such as the Adelaide Airport, State Parliament, Museum, Art Gallery and several hundred public schools. In 2008 Premier Mike Rann announced funding for $8 million worth of solar panels on the roof of the new Goyder Pavilion at the Adelaide Showground, the largest rooftop solar installation in Australia, qualifying it for official "power station" status. South Australia has the highest per capita take up of household solar power in Australia.

The installed PV capacity in Australia has increased 10-fold between 2009 and 2011, and quadrupled between 2011 and 2016. The first commercial-scale PV power plant, the 1 MW Uterne Solar Power Station, was opened in 2011. Greenough River Solar Farm opened in 2012 with a capacity of 10 MW. The price of photovoltaics has been decreasing, and in January 2013, was less than half the cost of using grid electricity in Australia.

Australia has been internationally criticised in the past for producing very little of its energy from solar power, despite its vast resources, extensive sunshine and overall high potential. As they became the world leader in solar energy per capita in 2019, this criticism has ceased.

By April 2021, over 2.3 million customers had equipped their homes with solar photovoltaic (PV) panels, representing 30% of all households.

=== Wind ===
Wind power is a mode of production of renewable energy in Australia. Wind power is a rapidly expanding mode of renewable energy production in Australia with an average annual rate of growth in installed capacity of 35% over the five years up to 2011. As of December 2017, there were 4,455 megawatts (MW) of installed capacity and a further 18,823 MW of capacity was proposed or committed. In 2016, wind power accounted for 5.3% of Australia's total electricity demand and 30.8% of total renewable energy supply. At the end of 2016 there were 79 wind farms in Australia, most of which had turbines from 1.5 to 3 MW. In addition, 16 projects with a combined installed capacity of 1,861 MW are either under construction, constructed or will start construction in 2017 having reached financial closure.

Wind power in South Australia has 36.9% of Australia's wind power capacity, accounting for 40% of the state's electricity needs as of 2016 and the first year in which wind power was the leading source of electricity in the state. By the end of 2011 wind power in South Australia reached 26% of the State's electricity generation, edging out coal-fired power for the first time. At that stage South Australia, with only 7.2% of Australia's population, had 54% of Australia's installed wind capacity.

Victoria also has a substantial system, with just under 30% of the Australia's capacity as of 2016. In August 2015, the Victorian government announced financial backing for new wind farms as part of a push to encourage renewable energy in the state, which was expected to bring forward the building of a modest 100 MW of new wind energy in the state, worth $200 million in investment. The government expected that there were about 2400 MW worth of Victorian projects that had been approved but were yet to be built.

=== Hydro ===
Hydropower has been the main renewable source for decades. The 3.8 GW Snowy Mountains Scheme and the 2.6 GW Hydro Tasmania are the largest facilities.

== Storage ==
The main power storage in Australia is the 600 MW Tumut 3 pumped-storage hydroelectricity.

The Snowy Hydro scheme in New South Wales is expanding by 2 GW through the Snowy 2.0 project, targeting a total of 6 GW by 2026. ARENA is also backing a new pumped storage project in North Queensland's former Kidston Gold Mine.

=== Battery ===
Since 2017, Australia has built several grid-scale batteries, mostly lithium-ion. The batteries are made to perform various functions for particular local purposes, with significant differences, particularly the energy capacity. Batteries perform most of the grid services, reducing cost during 2023-2025.

In 2021, the National Electricity Market (NEM) enhanced its battery storage with four new additions, providing over 500 MW and raising the total capacity to over 800 MW. The Victorian Big Battery, the largest at 360 MW, was a significant contributor. An additional 1,700 MW of battery capacity is anticipated for the NEM by 2025, supported by the Australian Renewable Energy Agency (ARENA) and the Clean Energy Finance Corporation (CEFC) to improve grid reliability.

Some parts of the Australian grid are thinly connected, and local outages have been common. The mining industry installs batteries to reduce fuel consumption.

Name	Commissioning date (actual or planned)	Energy (MWh)	Power (MW)	Duration (hours)	Type	State or Territory	Location/coords	Refs
Victorian Big Battery	December 2021	450	300	1.5	Lithium-ion	Victoria	Moorabool	
Hornsdale Power Reserve	1 December 2017	193	150	1.3	Lithium-ion	South Australia	33°05′09″S 138°31′06″E	
Gannawarra	July 2018	50	25	2	Lithium-ion	Victoria		
Ballarat	June 2018	30	30	1	Lithium-ion	Victoria		
CEP Energy, Kurri Kurri project		4800	1200	4	Lithium-ion	NSW		
Origin Energy Eraring storage project		2800	700	4	Lithium-ion	NSW		
Neoen Wallerawang Great Western Battery		1000	500	4	Lithium-ion	NSW		
Energy Australia Jeeralang big battery	2027	1400	350	4	Lithium-ion	Victoria		
ACT Queanbeyan	2022	200	100	2	Lithium-ion	ACT		

In South Australia a battery installation was performed to keep the local grid running until backup power could be bought on line. The Hornsdale Power Reserve is a grid-connected energy storage system co-located with the Hornsdale Wind Farm in the Mid North region of South Australia. It was promoted as the world's first big battery at the time. During 2017 Tesla won the contract and built the Hornsdale Power Reserve, for a capital cost of A$90 million, leading to the colloquial Tesla big battery name. In November 2019, Neoen confirmed that it was increasing capacity by a further 50 MW/64.5 MWh to a combined 185 MWh. The increased storage capacity was installed by 23 March 2020, and the increased power will follow later in the year. The battery demonstrated ability to perform grid functions, leading to several bigger batteries.

== National Electricity Market ==
The National Electricity Market (NEM) is an arrangement in Australia for the connection of the synchronous electricity transmission grids of the eastern and southern Australia states and territories to create a cross-state wholesale electricity market. The Australian Energy Market Commission develops and maintains the Australian National Electricity Rules (NER), which have the force of law in the states and territories participating in NEM. The Rules are enforced by the Australian Energy Regulator. The day-to-day management of NEM is performed by the Australian Energy Market Operator.

The NEM began operation on 13 December 1998 and operations currently includes Queensland, New South Wales, Australian Capital Territory, Victoria, Tasmania and South Australia. Western Australia and the Northern Territory are not connected to the NEM. The NEM comprises five regions, with the ACT being in the NSW region. Tasmania joined the NEM in May 2005 and became fully operational on 29 April 2006 when the Basslink interconnector was fully activated. The Snowy region was abolished as a region on 1 July 2008 and the components split between New South Wales and Victoria. The Northern Territory has adopted parts of the National Electricity Law, with the Australian Energy Market Commission becoming the rule maker for the Territory for parts of the National Electricity Rules from 1 July 2016. Western Australia is also considering adopting parts of the NER.

The NEM operates the world's longest interconnected power systems between Port Douglas, Queensland and Port Lincoln, South Australia with an end-to-end distance of more than 5000 kilometres, and 40,000 circuit kilometres. Over A$11 billion of electricity is traded annually in the NEM to meet the demand of almost 19 million end-use consumers. New South Wales accounts for about 25% of NEM.

== States and territories ==
=== Queensland ===
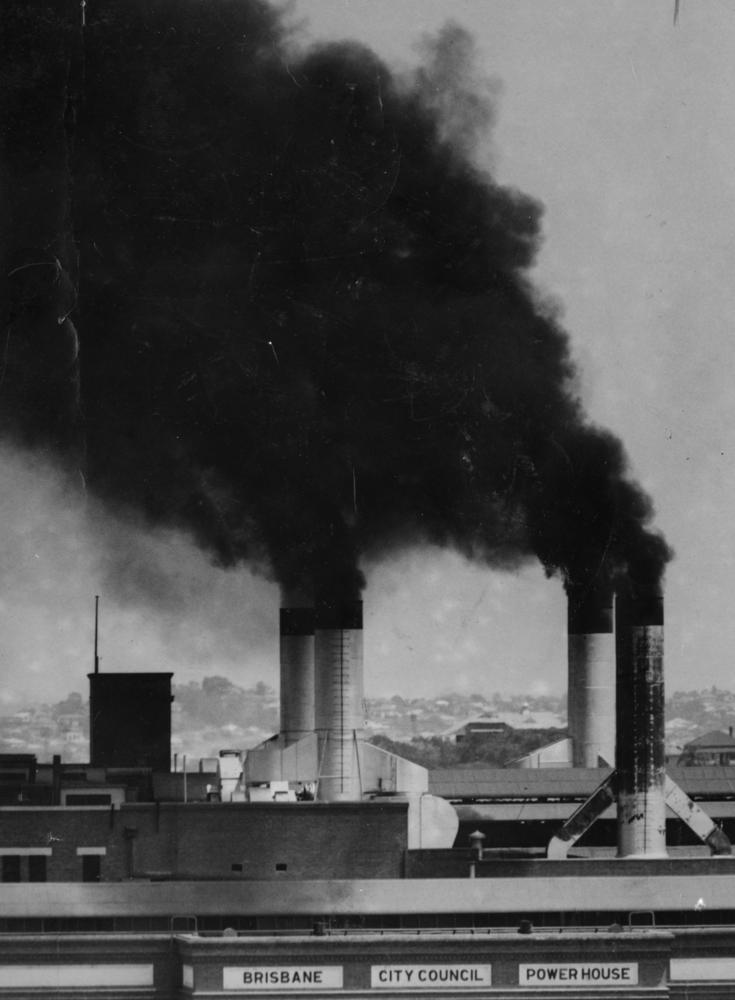
The New Farm Powerhouse in 1952 (now the Brisbane Powerhouse multi-arts venue)

Queensland, Australia's second largest state by land area (Western Australia being the largest), achieved the early leaders' dream of providing electricity to every home. Queensland proved to be a pioneer in the supply of electricity in Australia, with the first public demonstration in Australia, the first recorded use for public purposes in the country, the first Parliament House in Australia and the first commercial operations in Australia all occurring in Brisbane.

Generation and limited distribution was initially the responsibility of local authorities, until a central state-based authority to coordinate the generation and distribution of electrical power was established in 1938. In the late 1990s, the electricity sector was restructured to enable integration with the National Electricity Market (NEM).

The history of power generation and distribution in Queensland can be considered in three major phases: Initial local generation and distribution; creation of a statewide body and the consequent creation of an extensive network; and the restructure to enable integration with the NEM.

Queensland is the most decentralised mainland state, and initial local generation and distribution was the only viable option for the supply of electricity in many instances. The creation of regional, and then a statewide network from 1945 enabled economies of scale and reliability to be obtained, particularly by generating plants. Within a decade of the statewide network being completed, the establishment of the NEM provided new commercial opportunities for generators and improved reliability of supply.

=== South Australia ===
South Australia is rich in energy. It contains significant reserves of fossil fuels such as natural gas, coal, and oil – although there are incentives to phase these out in favour of clean energy. The state also contains large amounts of uranium, including the world's single biggest deposit at Olympic Dam, which represents 30% of the world's total resource.

The state has seen a rapid increase in investment in renewable energy, and was the leading producer of wind power in Australia in 2011. South Australia has been noted for the availability of hot rocks suitable for geothermal electricity generation. The South Australian Government has released plans to make South Australia a green energy hub for Australia's eastern seaboard. During 2020, the state set new records for its lowest (379 MW) and highest (2,576 MW) grid power. Prices also fell, and were negative 10% of the time in the third quarter, but by a smaller amount than previously. This mainly occurred in September, when solar farms paid to supply power. Curtailment was 5.5%, mainly in the daytime. In October 2020, South Australia exceeded 100% of the state's electricity demand using solar power for the first time.

=== Tasmania ===
A large proportion of Tasmania's power is produced by hydro-electric means. There are also a number of wind farms producing electricity. An underwater power cable, links Tasmania to mainland Australia. This connection was established in 2005. It allows for surplus electricity to be sold into the national grid. Alternatively electricity supply can also be imported if needed. The vast majority of the states power supply is classified as green energy.

=== Western Australia ===
Western Australia has its own grid the South West Interconnected System which is not connected to the rest of country due to distance.

=== Northern Territory ===
The Northern Territory has multiple grids, which are predominately run by two government owned companies, PowerWater and Territory Generation.

== Energy efficiency ==
Lower energy use could save A$25 billion, or A$840 per electricity customer, according to EnergyAustralia.
