= Project EnergyConnect =

Location
- Country: Australia
- State: South Australia and New South Wales
- Coordinates: 33.956°S 139.127°E
- General direction: West–East
- From: Robertstown, South Australia
- Passes through: Buronga, New South Wales
- To: Wagga Wagga, New South Wales

Ownership information
- Partners: ElectraNet and TransGrid

Construction information
- Construction started: 2022
- Expected: 2027

Technical information
- Type: overhead transmission line
- Current type: AC
- Total length: 900 km (560 mi)
- Capacity: 800 MW
- AC voltage: 330 kV
- Website: www.projectenergyconnect.com.au

Project EnergyConnect is an electricity transmission line which connects the South Australia and New South Wales districts of Australia’s National Electricity Market. Riverlink was a previous working title for the project, drawn from a proposal first raised in 1997. The Australian Energy Market Operator used RiverLink in its proposal for this interconnector, but the transmission companies in South Australia (ElectraNet) and New South Wales (TransGrid) now call it EnergyConnect. The first stage was switched on in April 2025.

South Australia and New South Wales already each have connections to Victoria, which also has a connection across Bass Strait to Tasmania, and New South Wales also has connections to Queensland. The connection between New South Wales and South Australia is intended to provide resilience and redundancy to the network. It is aimed to provide increased security of supply to South Australia and improve sharing of renewable energy with New South Wales.

Construction of the new interconnector was expected to cost A$1.8 billion, but increased to 3.6 billion by 2026. It will be 900 kilometres (560 mi) long, from Robertstown, South Australia to Wagga Wagga, New South Wales. It includes a spur from Buronga, New South Wales to Red Cliffs, Victoria. Assessment of the Regulatory Investment Test for Transmission (RIT-T) began in June 2019.

The link endpoints are at Robertstown where major transmission lines connect to the north and south of the South Australian grid, and Wagga Wagga, the furthest west that New South Wales high voltage lines reach. The new high-voltage line is expected to improve the feasibility of more solar and wind farms in the areas traversed by the line.

The Australian Energy Market Commission changed its rules in April 2019 to streamline the regulatory process for several network upgrades including Project EnergyConnect. The change allows the Australian Energy Regulator to consider the proposals concurrently. ElectraNet established information hubs near the South Australian part of the route to consult the public about the detailed route. One of the concerns is that the proposed route crosses Calperum Station which is home to a critically endangered species, the black-eared miner. New South Wales put the project on a fast-track development process by assigning it "critical infrastructure" status. The Clean Energy Finance Corporation issued a $295 million debt instrument for the project in May 2021.

A new substation will be built at Bundey, about 10 kilometres (6.2 mi) from Robertstown substation. The connection between those will operate at South Australia's transmission voltage of 275 kV. The interconnector main line east from Bundey will operate at New South Wales voltage of 330 kV. Substation construction contracts to build the new Bundey substation and expand Robertstown and Tungkillo substations were awarded to Consolidated Power Projects. The contract for the transmission lines to the South Australian border (200 kilometres (120 mi)) was let to Downer Utilities Australia. Construction began with the first towers out from Robertstown on 15 February 2022. Several power control items are to be connected to the line, including five 330 kV Phase Shifting Transformers, two synchronous condensers and four variable shunt reactors.

The first stage from Robertstown in South Australia to Buronga in NSW, plus the spur to Victoria, was operational in April 2025. The second stage to NSW was built in 2026, gradually increasing capability into 2027.

The eastern part of the connection has a large substation called Dinawan, conneting to 330 and 500 kV.
