= National Energy Guarantee =

Energy policy proposed in Australia in 2017

National Energy Guarantee (NEG) was an energy policy proposed by the Turnbull government in late 2017 to deal with rising energy prices in Australia and lack of clarity for energy companies to invest in energy infrastructure. The policy specifically targets energy companies in the National Electricity Market and large energy users to have a reliability obligation as well as emissions reduction obligations.

Turnbull's successor Scott Morrison announced in September 2018 that the government would focus on cheap electricity prices; Australia would (also without NEG) make efforts to lower carbon dioxide emissions.

The Labor Party has since announced that it will adopt the NEG as its energy policy.

== History ==
In the years leading up to the proposed NEG, energy policy in Australia included the Rudd government's proposed Carbon Pollution Reduction Scheme, the introduction and repeal of the Gillard government's Clean Energy Act 2011, the Abbott government's Emissions Reduction Fund, and proposals for an Emissions Intensity Scheme (EIS) and a Clean Energy Target (CET) among others. Throughout this time, energy prices in energy resource rich Australia continued to rise. In October 2017 the Turnbull government announced a new proposal, the National Energy Guarantee, intended to "lower electricity prices, make the system more reliable, encourage the right investment and reduce emissions". Subsidies and incentives for renewable energy will be scrapped under the plan. The Labor opposition argues the plan will destroy the renewables sector, but the government argues renewables can be competitive without subsidies, and expects Australia will still meet its Paris Agreement obligations under the plan. The Climate Council called the NEG "a woefully inadequate response" to climate change.

=== Politics ===
The government via the COAG Energy Council meeting on 14 July 2017 established the Energy Security Board to coordinate the implementation of the Finkel Review authored by Australian's Chief Scientist Alan Finkel. The government decided not to adopt the Clean Energy Target as recommended by the Finkel Review after coming pressure from the conservative elements of the Liberal Party as well as vocal climate deniers.

The NEG will need the support of the Australian states signed up to it to activate the scheme. The reason is the states need to pass legislation to change the functioning of the national electricity market. Government critics of emission reduction targets are advocating for a "hockey-stick" target, where the most reduction occurs in the years just before 2030.

==== Reliability obligation ====
The reliability obligation means that energy companies need to provide a mix of energy generation sources that can be fired up on demand to meet peak loads or emergency demand.

==== Low Emissions obligation ====
This dictates energy companies need to have in their mix of energy production from low emission sources like gas fired power stations, wind, solar, batteries or hydropower or even coal fired stations.

=== Compliance ===
The government indicated if these regulatory obligations are not met after a period of time, the government can take action such as deregistering non complying energy providers. The reliability guarantee is going to be set up by the Australian Energy Market Commission (AEMC) and Australian Energy Market Operator (AEMO).

The emissions guarantee will be established by the Commonwealth and overseen by the Australian Energy Regulator (AER).

== Modelling ==
In 2017, Federal Energy Minister Josh Frydenberg asked the Energy Security Board to undertake further modelling to determine the NEG's impact on the national electricity market. The minister also forecast in the best scenario, the NEG can deliver price reduction of 6 percent of power bills. It is equivalent to an average $115 annual savings from 2020 to 2030. As of July 2018, the Energy Security Board's model has not been made public.
