= Merryn York =

Australian electrical engineer

- Education: University of Queensland
- Occupation: CEO
- Employer: AEMO
- Known for: Renewable energy

Merryn York AM, is an electrical engineer, a Fellow of the Australian Adademy of Technology and Engineering, and was awarded an Order of Australia on the King's Birthday, 2025, for 'significant services to the energy sector in various leadership roles'.

== Education and early life ==
York grew up in Maryborough, near the Fraser Coast of Queensland. Her father instilled in her a love of maths and science, as he was an engineer, also in the electricity sector.

York received a Bachelor of Engineering and a Master of Engineering, both from the University of Queensland. Upon graduating, York took a role as the Principal Engineer of Grid Controls Planning, within the Queensland Electricity Commission.

== Career ==
York is an electrical engineer, working in the energy sector in Australia. Her career choice, to work in electricity sector, was due to the technical complexity of the topic, as well as the ability to provide a community service.

York was a Commissioner of the Australian Energy Market Commission (AEMC), and was the Chief Executive of Queensland Powerlink between 2011-2019. York joined AEMO in 2022, was the executive general manager of System Design at AEMO, until May 2025.

York was appointed to the board of Snowy Hydro in September 2026.

== Women in STEM ==
York is an advocate of Women in Science Technology, Engineering and Maths, and while discussing the Women in Engineering program at the University of Queensland, commented that,

"inspiring women to take up careers in engineering would result in a more diverse, inclusive profession that better reflected communities."

When York was appointed the acting chair of AEMC, in July 2025, this meant that all four of the principal energy regulatory bodies in Australia were headed by women.

== Awards ==
- 2022 – Fellow of the Australian Academy of Technology and Engineering
- 2022 – Excellence Awards, Honorary Fellow of Engineers Australia
- 2025 – Member of the Order of Australia, King's Birthday Honours
