= Riverlink =

Riverlink, RiverLink, or River Link may refer to:

- Project EnergyConnect, an electricity transmission line in Australia previously known by the working title of Riverlink
- River Link (Devon), a boat and bus operator in Devon, England
- RiverLink Ferry, a passenger ferry operating between Philadelphia, Pennsylvania and Camden, New Jersey
- Riverlink Shopping Centre, a shopping centre in Queensland
