= Standing Council on Energy and Resources =

The Standing Council on Energy and Resources (SCER) is a council established by the Council of Australian Governments (COAG) in June 2011 to pursue priority issues of national significance in the energy and resources sectors, and progress the key reform elements facing the mineral, petroleum and energy sectors.

The council's forerunners were the Ministerial Council on Mineral and Petroleum Resources and the Ministerial Council on Energy.

The members of the council are the Commonwealth, State, Territory and New Zealand Ministers with responsibility for energy and resource matters.

== See also ==
- National Electricity Market
- Australian Energy Market Commission
