= Energy in Australia =

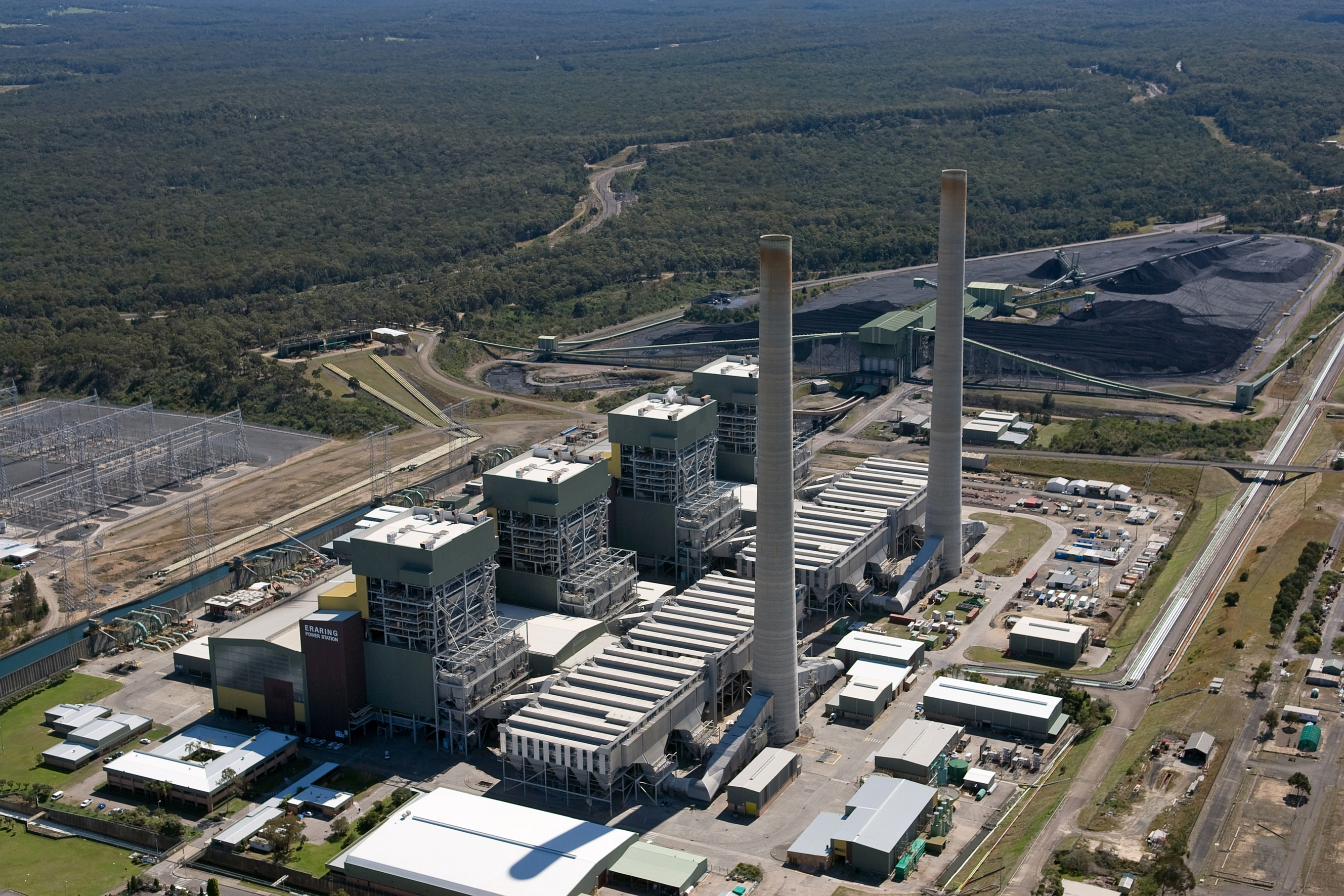
Eraring coal fired power station, Australia's largest power station

Energy consumption by source, Australia

Energy in Australia is the production in Australia of energy and electricity, for consumption or export. Energy policy of Australia describes the politics of Australia as it relates to energy.

In 2021, Australia was a net energy exporter and one of the largest exporters in the world of liquefied natural gas (LNG), coal, and minerals.

Energy consumption is dominated by oil and other fossil fuels, however, recently, due to the increasing effects of global warming and human-induced climate change on the global environment, there has been a shift towards renewable energy such as solar power and wind power both in Australia and abroad. In 2025, renewable energy accounted for 42.7% of the total amount of electricity generated in Australia.

== Overview ==
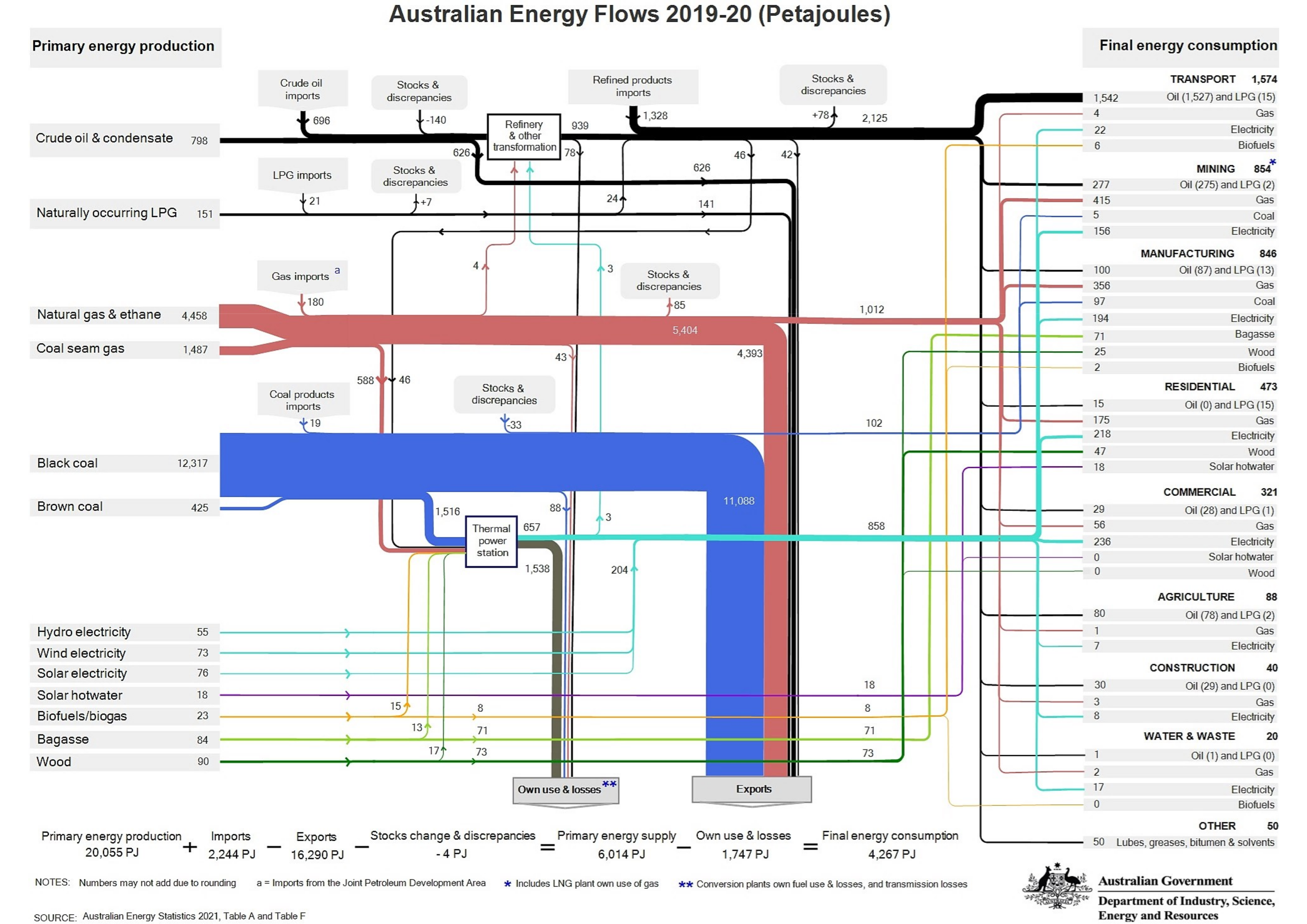
Infographic showing Australian energy production, consumption, imports, and exports by fuel type and industry

Australian total primary energy supply (TPES) by fuel type (in PJ)
Fin. Year	Oil	Coal	Natural Gas	Renewables	Total
2009-10	2,058 (34.6%)	2,229 (37.5%)	1,372 (23.1%)	286 (4.8%)	5,945
2010-11	2,195 (36.0%)	2,129 (34.9%)	1,516 (24.8%)	260 (4.3%)	6,100
2011-12	2,411 (38.9%)	2,118 (34.2%)	1,399 (22.6%)	265 (4.3%)	6,194
2012-13	2,221 (37.7%)	1,946 (33.1%)	1,386 (23.6%)	330 (5.6%)	5,884
2013-14	2,237.8 (38.4%)	1,845.6 (31.7%)	1,401.9 (24.0%)	345.7 (5.9%)	5,831.1
2014-15	2,237.4 (37.8%)	1,907.8 (32.2%)	1,431.0 (24.2%)	343.3 (5.8%)	5,919.6
2015-16	2,243.3 (37.0%)	1,956.1 (32.2%)	1,504.9 (24.8%)	361.6 (6.0%)	6,065.9
2016-17	2,315.4 (37.7%)	1,936.9 (31.5%)	1,515.0 (24.7%)	378.7 (6.2%)	6,145.8
2017-18	2,387.8 (38.7%)	1,847.2 (29.9%)	1,554.6 (25.2%)	382.1 (6.2%)	6,171.7
2018-19	2,402.1 (38.8%)	1,801.6 (29.1%)	1,592.7 (25.7%)	399.6 (6.4%)	6,196.0
2019-20	2,241.2 (37.3%)	1,706.6 (28.4%)	1,647.2 (27.4%)	418.8 (7.0%)	6,013.8
2020-21	2,082.2 (36.1%)	1,661.4 (28.8%)	1,561.1 (27.1%)	464.6 (8.1%)	5,769.2
2021-22	2,106.9 (36.5%)	1,586.8 (27.5%)	1,559.3 (27.1%)	512.5 (8.9%)	5,762.1
2022-23	2,285.5 (38.9%)	1,525.0 (25.9%)	1,518.1 (25.8%)	553.6 (9.4%)	5,882.2
2023-24	2,431.6 (40.7%)	1,510.4 (25.3%)	1,477.7 (24.7%)	557.1 (9.3%)	5,976.7
2024-25	2,352.3 (40.1%)	1,469.1 (25.0%)	1,452.8 (24.7%)	595.1 (10.1%)	5,871.7

In 2009, Australia had the highest per capita CO_{2} emissions in the world. At that time, Maplecroft's CO_{2} Energy Emissions Index (CEEI) showed that Australia releases 20.58 tons of CO_{2} per person per year, more than any other country. However, emissions have since been reduced. From 1990 to 2017, emissions per capita fell by one-third, with most of that drop occurring in the more recent years. Additionally, the emissions intensity of the economy fell by 58.4 percent during the same time period. These are the lowest values in 27 years.

== Policy ==
Energy policy in Australia is managed by its states and territories as well as at the federal level. The federal government sets the broad energy framework, including national targets for renewable energy, emissions reduction, and energy security. It is responsible for implementing national energy policies, overseeing the operation of the national electricity market (NEM), regulating fossil fuel industries, and managing energy subsidies and tax incentives. Additionally, the federal government plays a key role in coordinating national energy infrastructure projects, including large-scale renewable energy initiatives, and sets legislation that governs energy efficiency standards, and environmental protections.

State and territory governments in Australia are responsible for implementing energy policies at the local level, including managing energy infrastructure, overseeing electricity networks, and setting state-specific renewable energy targets. They also govern energy efficiency programs, energy pricing, and supply security within their jurisdictions.

In 2023, Australia's energy consumption increased for the first time in four years and energy use in electricity supply decreased as coal generation continues to fall. With a rebound in activity post COVID-19, transport and commercial energy use increased. As of 2023, Australia remains heavily reliant on fossil fuels, particularly coal, for electricity generation. In 2023, coal accounted for 46% of Australia's total electricity generation, down slightly from 47% in 2022. In the 2022–23 financial year, oil sources contributed to approximately 38.9% of Australia's total energy consumption. The 2022–23 financial year set a record for Australia's clean energy supply. Australia has one of the fastest renewable energy deployment rates worldwide. The country deployed 5.2 GW of solar and wind power in 2018 and has significantly increased its renewable energy capacity since. During the 2022-23 year, renewable energy generation increased 11%, accounting for 34% of Australia's electricity generation- 16% from solar, 12% from wind, and 6% from hydro—the highest share recorded to date. Solar power generation grew 21% in the 2022–23 year and is 11 times higher than a decade ago.

=== Electricity generation ===
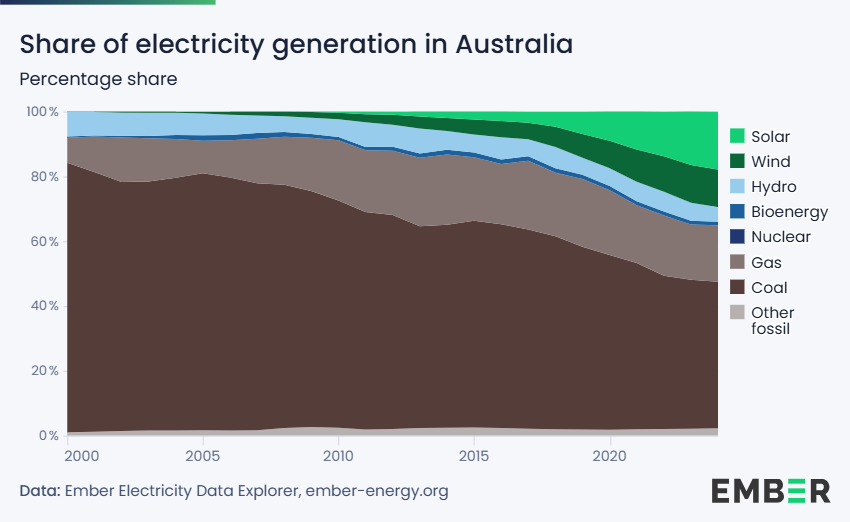
Share of electricity generation in Australia - percentage share

==== History and governance ====
After World War II, New South Wales and Victoria started connecting the formerly small and self-contained local and regional power grids into statewide grids run centrally by public statutory authorities. Similar developments occurred in other states. Both of the industrially large states cooperated with the Commonwealth in the development and interconnection of the Snowy Mountains Scheme.

Rapid economic growth led to large and expanding construction programs of coal-fired power stations such as black coal in New South Wales and brown coal in Victoria. By the 1980s complex policy questions had emerged involving the massive requirements for investment, land and water.

Between 1981 and 1983 a cascade of blackouts and disruptions was triggered in both states, resulting from generator design failures in New South Wales, industrial disputes in Victoria, and drought in the storages of the Snowy system (which provided essential peak power to the State systems). Wide political controversy arose from this and from proposals to the New South Wales Government from the Electricity Commission of New South Wales for urgent approval to build large new stations at Mardi and Olney on the Central Coast, and at other sites later.

The Commission of Enquiry into Electricity Generation Planning in New South Wales was established, reporting in mid-1985. This was the first independent enquiry directed from outside the industry into the Australian electricity system. It found, among other matters, that existing power stations were very inefficient, that plans for four new stations, worth then about $12 billion, should be abandoned, and that if the sector were restructured there should be sufficient capacity for normal purposes until the early years of the 21st century. This forecast was achieved. The commission also recommended enhanced operational coordination of the adjoining State systems and the interconnection in eastern Australia of regional power markets.

The New South Wales Enquiry marked the beginning of the end of the centralised power utility monopolies and established the direction of a new trajectory in Australian energy policy, towards decentralisation, interconnection of States and the use of markets for coordination. Similar enquiries were subsequently established in Victoria (by the Parliament and with help from Mayer H) and elsewhere, and during the 1990s the industry was comprehensively restructured in southeastern Australia and subsequently corporatized..

Following the report by the Industry Commission on the sector moves towards a national market developed. The impetus towards system-wide competition was encouraged by the Hilmer recommendations. The establishment of the National Electricity Market in 1997 was the first major accomplishment of the new Federal/State cooperative arrangements under the Council of Australian Governments. The governance provisions included a National Electricity Code, the establishment in 1996 of a central market manager, the National Electricity Market Management Company (NEMMCO), and a regulator, National Electricity Code Administrator (NECA).

Following several years experience with the new system and several controversies an energy market reform process was conducted by the Ministerial Council on Energy. As a result, beginning in 2004, a broader national arrangement, including electricity and gas and other forms of energy, was established. These arrangements are administered by a national regulator, the Australian Energy Regulator (AER), and a market rule-making body, the Australian Energy Market Commission (AEMC), and a market operator, the Australian Energy Market Operator (AEMO).

Over the 10 years from 1998–99 to 2008–09, Australia's electricity use increased at an average rate of 2.5% a year. In 2008–09, a total of 261 terawatt-hours (940 PJ) of electricity (including off-grid electricity) was generated in Australia. Between 2009 and 2013 NEM energy usage had decreased by 4.3% or almost 8 terawatt-hours (29 PJ).

==== Coal-fired power ====
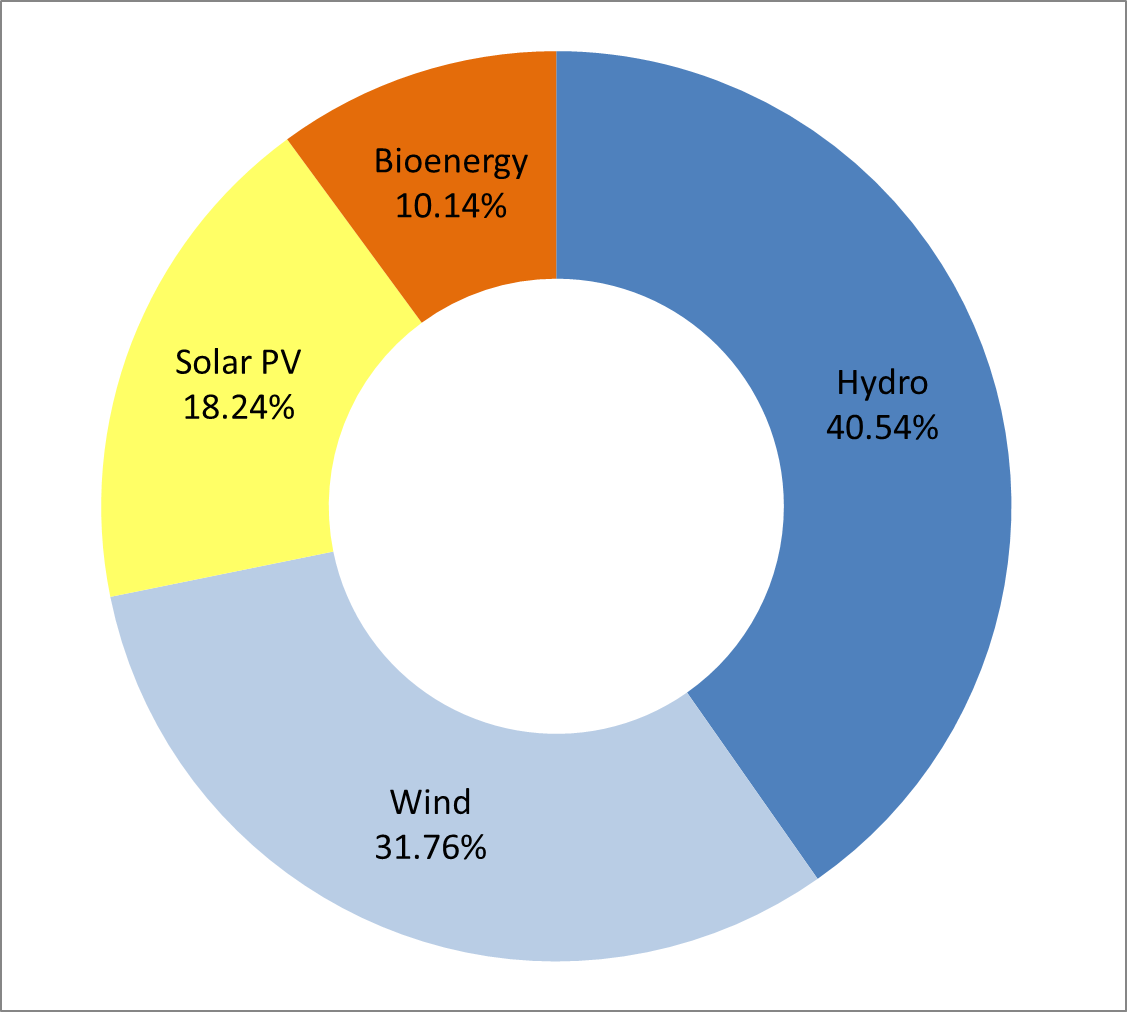
Electricity generation from renewable sources in Australia, 2015-16

Australia had a fixed carbon price of A$23 ($23.78) a tonne on the top 500 polluters from July 2012 to July 2014.

==== Nuclear power ====
Jervis Bay Nuclear Power Plant was a proposed nuclear power reactor in the Jervis Bay Territory on the south coast of New South Wales. It would have been Australia's first nuclear power plant, and was the only proposal to have received serious consideration as of 2005. Some environmental studies and site works were completed, and two rounds of tenders were called and evaluated, but the Australian government decided not to proceed with the project.

Queensland introduced legislation to ban nuclear power development on 20 February 2007. Tasmania has also banned nuclear power development. Both laws were enacted in response to a pro-nuclear position, by John Howard in 2006.

John Howard went to the November 2007 election with a pro-nuclear power platform but his government was soundly defeated by Labor, which is opposed to nuclear power for Australia.

==== Geothermal power ====
The 2008 federal budget allocated $50 million through the Renewable Energy Fund to assist with 'proof-of-concept' projects in known geothermal areas.

=== Carbon capture ===
The IPCC AR4 Working Group III Report "Mitigation of Climate Change" states that under Scenario A (stabilisation at 450ppm) Annex 1 countries (including Australia) will need to reduce greenhouse gas emissions by 25% to 40% by 2020 and 80% to 95% by 2050. Many environmental groups around the world, including those represented in Australia, are taking direct action for the dramatic reduction in the use of coal as carbon capture and storage is not expected to be ready before 2020 if ever commercially viable.

=== Federal Government ===
Australia introduced a national energy rating label in 1992. The system allows consumers to compare the energy efficiency between similar appliances.

==== Institutions ====
The responsible governmental agencies for energy policy are the Council of Australian Governments (COAG), the Ministerial Council on Energy (MCE), the Ministerial Council on Mineral and Petroleum Resources (MCMPR), the Commonwealth Department of Resources; Energy and Tourism (DRET), the Department of Environment and Heritage (DEH), the Australian Greenhouse Office (AGO), the Department of Transport and Regional Services, the Australian Competition and Consumer Commission (ACCC), the Australian Energy Market Commission, the Australian Energy Regulator and the Australian Energy Market Operator.

==== Carbon tax ====
On 1 July 2012, the Australian Federal government introduced a carbon tax of A$23 (US$17.29) per tonne on selected fossil fuels consumed by major industrial emitters and government bodies such as councils. To offset the tax, the government reduced income tax (by increasing the tax-free threshold) and increased pensions and welfare payments slightly, while introducing compensation for some affected industries. On 17 July 2014, a report by the Australian National University estimated that the Australian scheme had cut carbon emissions by as much as 17 million tonnes. The tax notably helped reduce pollution from the electricity sector.

On 17 July 2014, the Abbott government passed repeal legislation through the Senate, and Australia became the first nation to abolish a carbon tax. In its place, the government set up the Emission Reduction Fund.

==== Energy strategy ====
In the 2004 White Paper Securing Australia's Energy Future, several initiatives were announced to achieve the Australian Government's energy objectives. These include:

- a complete overhaul of the fuel excise system to remove A$1.5 billion in excise liability from businesses and households in the period to 2012–13
- the establishment of a A$500 million fund to leverage more than A$1 billion in private investment to develop and demonstrate low-emission technologies
- a strong emphasis on the urgency and importance of continued energy market reform
- the provision of A$75 million for Solar Cities trials in urban areas to demonstrate a new energy scenario, bringing together the benefits of solar energy, energy efficiency and vibrant energy markets
- the provision of A$134 million to remove impediments to the commercial development of renewable technologies
- incentives for petroleum exploration in frontier offshore areas as announced in the 2004–05 budget
- New requirements for a business to manage their emissions wisely
- a requirement that larger energy users undertake, and report publicly on, regular assessments to identify energy efficiency opportunities.

Criticisms

1. On a net basis this is a tax on the top 40% of income earners which will then be used largely to subsidise the coal industry in attempts to develop carbon capture and storage in Australia, clean coal.
2. Deforestation is not included in the scheme where there will be reforestation despite the significant timing differences, the uncertainty of reforestation and the effect of leaving old-growth forests vulnerable.
3. It is unclear what level of a carbon price will be sufficient to reduce demand for coal-fired power and increase demand for low emissions electricity like wind or solar.
4. No commitment to maintain Mandatory Renewable Energy Target.
5. The scheme fails to address climate change caused by burning of coal exported from Australia.

==== Energy market reform ====
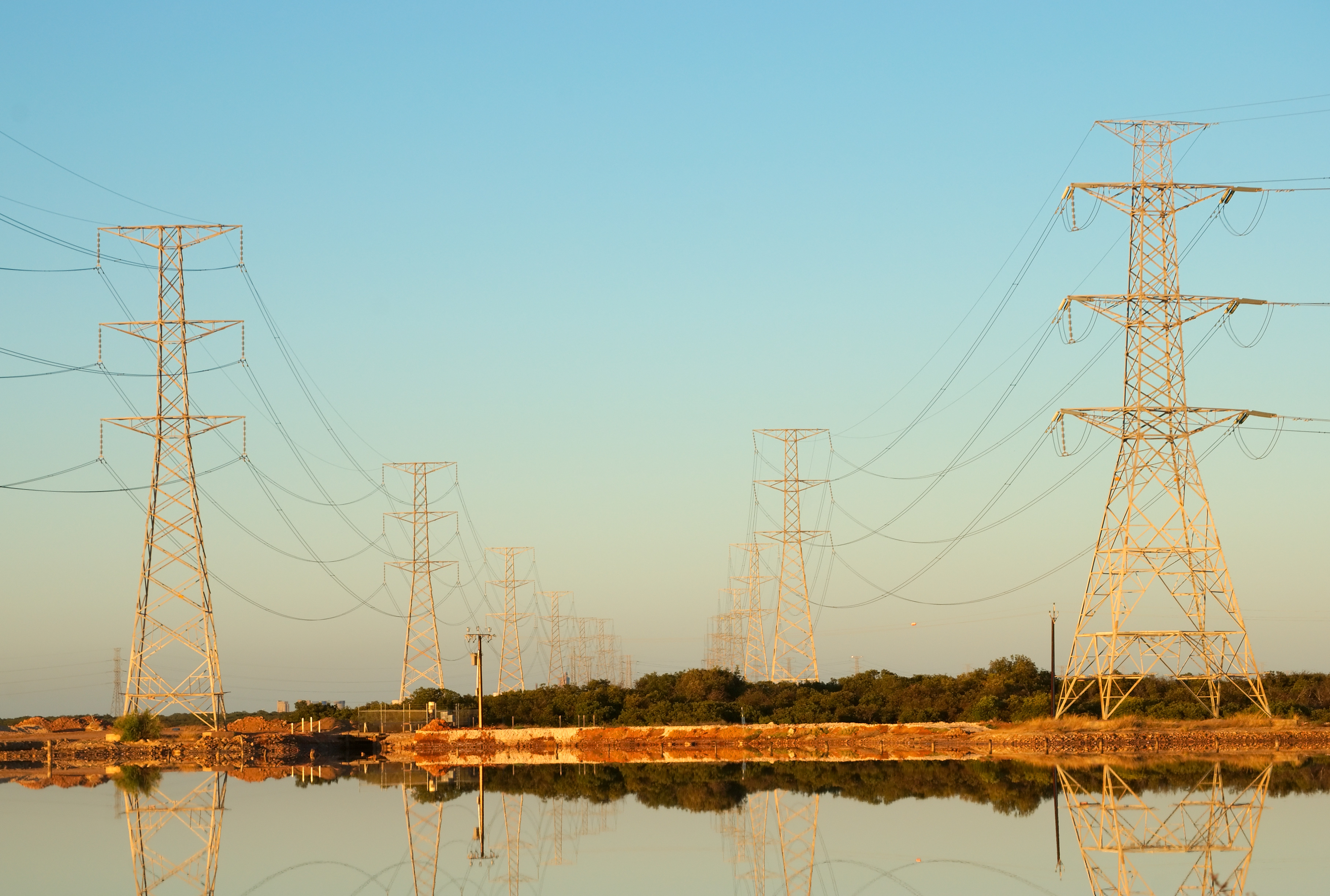
Power lines in South Australia

On 11 December 2003, the Ministerial Council on Energy released a document entitled "Reform of Energy Markets". The overall purpose of this initiative was the creation of national electricity and natural gas markets rather than the state-based provision of both. As a result, two federal-level institutions, the Australian Energy Market Commission (AEMC) and the Australian Energy Regulator (AER), were created.

==== Finkel Report ====
In June 2017 Alan Finkel released The Independent Review into the Future Security of the National Electricity Market (commonly referred to as the Finkel Report), which proposed an approach to increasing energy security and reliability through four outcomes. These would be: increased security, future reliability, rewarding consumers, and lower emissions. The report ultimately recommended a Clean Energy Target (CET) to provide incentives for growth in renewable energies.

The reaction to the report by scientific experts in the field leaned more towards positive. Positive reactions to the Report were due to the national strategy plan that provides a CET for Australia, creating customer incentives, and takes politics out of energy policy to help meet the Paris Agreement. Additionally, the Finkel Report was commended for recognizing the current technologies available and including market forces in its solutions by the Australian Academy of Technology Engineering.

==== National Energy Guarantee ====
On 17 October 2017, the Australian Government rejected Finkel's CET proposal, in favour of what it called the National Energy Guarantee (NEG), to reduce power prices and prevent blackouts. The strategy calls on electricity retailers to meet separate reliability and emissions requirements, rather than Dr Finkel's CET recommendation. Under the plan, retailers have to provide a minimum amount of baseload power from coal, gas or hydro, while also providing a specified level of low emissions energy. NEG has been criticised as turning away from renewable energy. In October 2018, the Australian Government announced that it would not continue with the Guarantee.

=== State policies ===
==== Queensland ====
Queensland's energy policy has evolved significantly to prioritize renewable energy and reduce emissions. The state has implemented a renewable energy target (RET) of 50% by 2030, supported by the Queensland Renewable Energy Zones (REZs), which aim to optimize transmission infrastructure for renewable energy generation. The state is heavily invested in solar energy, with Queensland having the largest amount of rooftop solar installations in the country. Additionally, Queensland's government has allocated funding to support large-scale renewable projects, including solar, wind, and energy storage systems, as part of its long-term energy transition plan.

==== Victoria ====
In 2006, Victoria set a renewable energy target of 10% by 2016, which was the first state-level target of its kind. This target was increased in 2010 to 25% by 2020, and more recently, the state has set ambitious new targets, including 65% renewable energy by 2030 and 95% by 2035. Victoria is also reviving the State Electricity Commission (SEC) to further invest in renewable energy and storage, ensuring a transition that does not compromise energy reliability.

==== New South Wales ====
New South Wales (NSW) committed to achieving net-zero emissions by 2050 with the release of the NSW Climate Change Policy Framework in 2016. This framework set the long-term objective for the state to reach net-zero emissions by 2050 and to enhance resilience against climate change impacts. In recent years New South Wales has introduced initiatives like the Renewable Energy Zones (REZs) to help streamline the development of wind, solar, and storage technologies. Additionally, the Snowy Mountains Scheme, a major hydroelectric project, plays a critical role in supporting the state's energy grid, providing storage and backup power when renewable sources are unavailable.

==== Western Australia ====
Western Australia's energy policy is shaped by its geographical isolation and vast remote areas, where renewable energy has become an increasingly viable alternative to fossil fuels. The use of diesel and natural gas is expensive in these areas, making solar, wind, and storage technologies more competitive. As of 2018, the state had not committed to a specific renewable energy target. However, in May 2019, 21 Western Australian councils called on the state government to adopt targets for a 50% renewable electricity supply by 2030 and net-zero emissions by 2050. Several regions are progressing toward integrating more renewable energy solutions, particularly hydropower in the north-west. The state is developing a large-scale hydrogen industry to complement its renewable energy generation capabilities, with several projects underway to harness this emerging sector.

==== Australian Capital Territory ====
The Australian Capital Territory (ACT) has been a pioneer in the adoption of renewable energy, achieving 100% renewable electricity supply by 2020, a goal that surpassed many other jurisdictions globally. The ACT's commitment to renewable energy was formalized in its Climate Change Strategy 2019–2025, which set the 100% target for 2020. To achieve this, the territory employed mechanisms such as reverse auctions to fund renewable energy generation projects, cumulatively amounting to 650 megawatts. signed a 14-year contract with Neoen to purchase 100 megawatts (MW) of wind energy from Stage 1 of the Goyder Renewables Zone in South Australia. While the ACT's electricity consumption is matched by renewable energy generation, the territory remains connected to the national power grid. This means that at any given moment, the electricity physically consumed may include non-renewable sources; however, the ACT ensures that an equivalent amount of renewable energy is produced to offset its total consumption. The ACT's government is now focused on expanding its climate leadership, with policies such as the transition to zero emissions vehicles and the establishment of carbon-neutral building standards. Additionally, the ACT's focus on urban energy efficiency, alongside its renewable energy commitment, places the territory at the forefront of climate action within Australia's federal system.

==== Tasmania ====
Tasmania's electricity grid is largely powered by hydroelectricity, which accounts for over 80% of the state's energy generation. The state set a goal of achieving 100% renewable energy by 2022, which was reached two years ahead of schedule. Tasmania is now focusing on expanding its renewable energy capacity, with plans to leverage wind energy and pumped hydro storage to further increase its renewable share, aiming to achieve 200% renewable energy generation by 2040. The target will allow Tasmania to export clean energy to other regions of Australia.

=== Renewable energy targets ===
In 2001, the federal government introduced a Mandatory Renewable Energy Target (MRET) of 9,500 GWh of new generation, with the scheme running until at least 2020. This represents an increase of new renewable electricity generation of about 4% of Australia's total electricity generation and a doubling of renewable generation from 1997 levels. Australia's renewable energy target does not cover heating or transport energy like Europe's or China's, Australia's target is therefore equivalent to approximately 5% of all energy from renewable sources.

The Commonwealth and the states agreed in December 2007, at a Council of Australian Governments (COAG) meeting, to work together from 2008, to combine the Commonwealth scheme with the disparate state schemes, into a single national scheme. The initial report on progress and an implementation plan was considered at a March 2008 COAG meeting. In May 2008, the Productivity Commission, the government's independent research and advisory body on a range of economic, social and environmental issues, claimed the MRET would drive up energy prices and would do nothing to cut greenhouse gas emissions. The Productivity Commission submission to the climate change review, stated that energy generators have warned that big coal-fired power stations are at risk of "crashing out of the system", and leaving huge supply gaps and price spikes if the transition is not carefully managed. This forecast has been described as a joke because up to A$20 billion compensation is proposed to be paid under the Carbon Pollution Reduction Scheme. In addition, in Victoria where the highest emitting power stations are located, the state government has emergency powers enabling it to take over and run the generating assets. The final design was presented for consideration at the September 2008 COAG meeting.

On 20 August 2009, the Expanded Renewable Energy Target increased the 2020 MRET from 9,500 to 45,000 gigawatt-hours, and continued until 2030. This will ensure that renewable energy reaches a 20% share of the electricity supply in Australia by 2020. After 2020, the proposed Emissions Trading Scheme and improved efficiencies from innovation and manufacturing were expected to allow the MRET to be phased out by 2030. The target was criticised as unambitious and ineffective in reducing Australia's fossil fuel dependency, as it only applied to generated electricity, but not to the 77% of energy production exported, nor to energy sources which are not used for electricity generation, such as the oil used in transportation. Thus 20% renewable energy in electricity generation would represent less than 2% of total energy production in Australia.

Computer modelling by the National Generators Forum has signalled the price on greenhouse emissions will need to rise from $20 a tonne in 2010 to $150 a tonne by 2050 if the federal government is to deliver its promised cuts. Generators of Australia's electricity warned of blackouts and power price spikes if the federal government moved too aggressively to put a price on greenhouse emissions.

South Australia achieved its target of 20% of renewable supply by 2014 three years ahead of schedule (i.e. in 2011). In 2008 it set a new target of 33% by 2020. New South Wales and Victoria have renewable energy targets of 20% and 25% respectively by 2020. Tasmania has had 100% renewable energy for a long time.

In 2011 the 'expanded MRET' was split into two schemes: a 41,000 GWh Large-scale Renewable Energy Target (LRET) for utility-scale renewable generators, and an uncapped Small-scale Renewable Energy Scheme for small household and commercial-scale generators.

The MRET requires wholesale purchasers of electricity (such as electricity retailers or industrial operations) to purchase renewable energy certificates (RECs), created through the generation of electricity from renewable sources, including wind, hydro, landfill gas and geothermal, as well as solar PV and solar thermal. The objective is to provide a stimulus and additional revenue for these technologies. Since 1 January 2011, RECs were split into small-scale technology certificates (STCs) and large-scale generation certificates (LGCs). RECs are still used as a general term covering both STCs and LGCs.

In 2014, the Abbott government initiated the Warburton Review and subsequently held negotiations with the Labor Opposition. In June 2015, the 2020 LRET was reduced to 33,000 GWh. This will result in more than 23.5% of Australia's electricity being derived from renewable sources by 2020. The required gigawatt-hours of renewable source electricity from 2017 to 2019 were also adjusted to reflect the new target.

==== Low Emissions Technology Demonstration Fund (LETDF) ====
- $500 million – competitive grants
- $1 billion – private sector funds

Currently has funded six projects to help reduce GHG emissions, which are summarised below

Project	Details	Funding [Mio$. ]
Chevron – CO_{2} injection program	natural gas extraction, carbon capture and underground storage	60
CS Energy – Callide A Oxy-fuel Demonstration Project	black coal power with carbon capture and underground storage	50
Fairview Power – Project Zero Carbon from Coal Seams	gas power station with seam injection of CO_{2}	75
Solar Systems Australia – Large Scale Solar Concentrator	concentrated sunlight solar power	75
International Power -Hazelwood 2030 A Clean Coal Future	drying of brown coal, carbon capture and underground storage	50
HRL Limited -Loy Yang IDGCC project	combined drying coal systems	100
Total		410

82% of subsidies are concentrated in the Australian Government's 'Clean Coal Technology', with the remaining 18% of funds allocated to the renewable energy 'Project Solar Systems Australia' $75 million. The LETDF is a new subsidy scheme aimed at fossil fuel energy production started in 2007.

=== Domestic gas reservation policy ===
Western Australia has a domestic gas reservation policy that requires gas exporters to make 15% of export production available for domestic consumption.

=== Feed-in tariffs ===
Between 2008 and 2012 most states and territories in Australia implemented various feed-in tariff arrangements to promote uptake of renewable electricity, primarily in the form of rooftop solar PV systems. As system costs fell uptake accelerated rapidly (in conjunction with the assistance provided through the national-level Small-scale Renewable Energy Scheme (SRES)) and these schemes were progressively wound back.

== Fuels ==
=== Coal ===
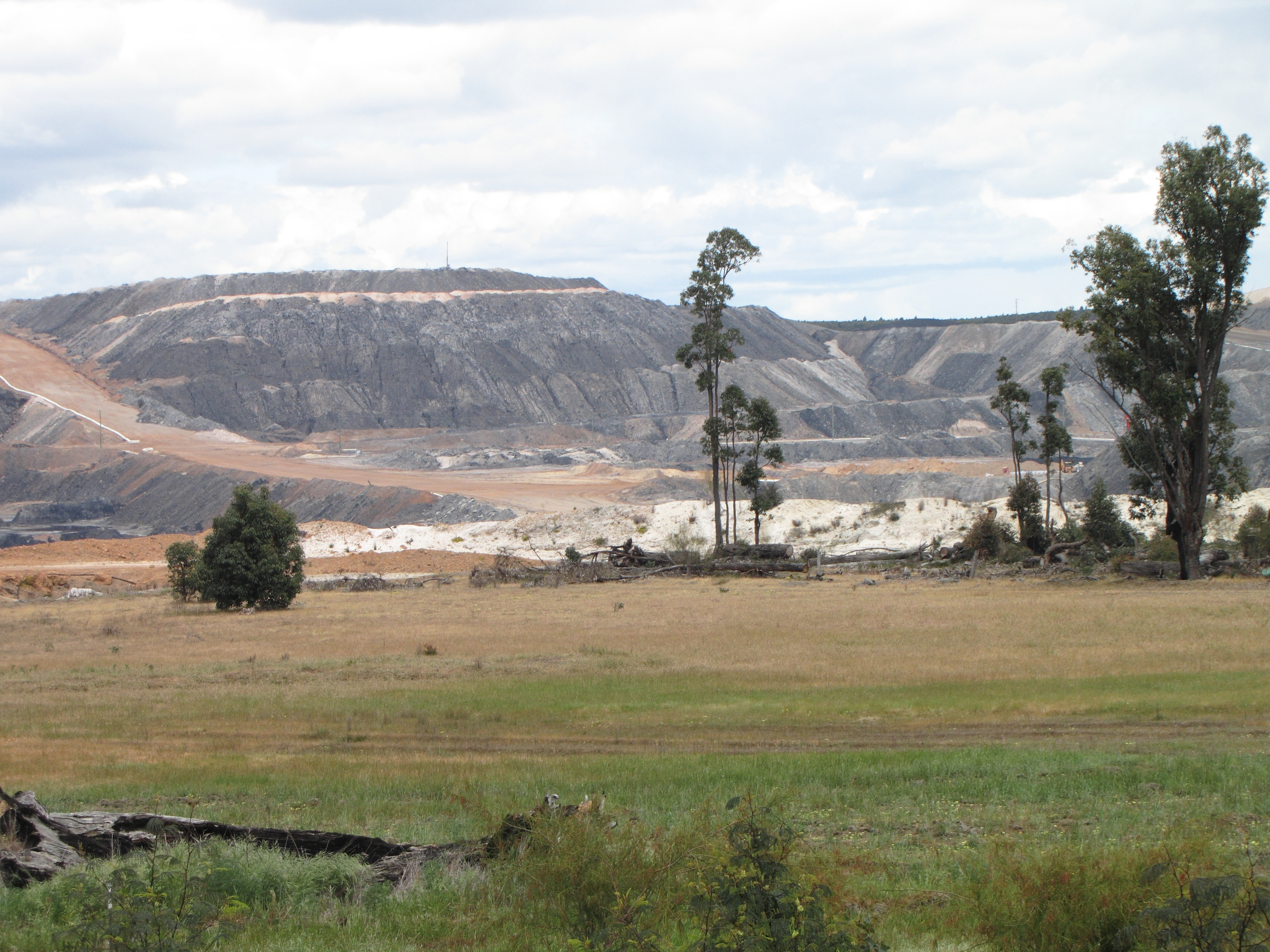
Coal mine near Collie, Western Australia, 2010

Australia is the fourth-largest coal producing country in the world. Newcastle is the largest coal export port in the world. In 2005, Australia mined 301 million tonnes of hard coal (which converted to at least 692.3 million tonnes of co2 emitted) and 71 million tonnes of brown coal (which converted to at least 78.1 million tonnes of co2).) Coal is mined in every state of Australia. It provides about 85% of Australia's electricity production and is Australia's largest export commodity. 75% of the coal mined in Australia is exported, mostly to eastern Asia. In 2005, Australia was the largest coal exporter in the world with 231 million tonnes of hard coal. Australian black coal exports are expected by some to increase by 2.6% per year to reach 438 million tonnes by 2029–30, but the possible introduction of emissions trading schemes in customer countries as provided for under the Kyoto Protocol may affect these expectations in the medium term.

The main source of Australia's electricity generation is coal. In 2003, coal-fired plants produced 58.4% of the total capacity, followed by hydropower (19.1%, of which 17% is pumped storage), natural gas (13.5%), liquid/gas fossil fuel-switching plants (5.4%), oil products (2.9%), wind power (0.4%), biomass (0.2%) and solar (0.1%). In 2003, coal-fired power plants generated 77.2% of the country's total electricity production, followed by natural gas (13.8%), hydropower (7.0%), oil (1.0%), biomass (0.6%) and solar and wind combined (0.3%).

The total generating capacity from all sources in 2008-9 was approximately 51 gigawatts (68,000,000 hp) with average capacity utilisation of 52%. Coal-fired plants constituted a majority of generating capacity which in 2008-9 was 29.4 gigawatts (39,400,000 hp). In 2008–9, a total of 143.2 terawatt-hours (516 PJ) of electricity was produced from black coal and 56.9 terawatt-hours (205 PJ) from brown coal. Depending on the cost of coal at the power station, the long-run marginal cost of coal-based electricity at power stations in eastern Australia is between 7 and 8 cents per kWh, which is around $79 per MWh. In 2009, Australia was the fourth-highest coal producer in the world, producing 335 megatonnes (Mt) of anthracite (black coal) and 64 Mt of lignite (brown coal). Australia was the biggest anthracite exporter, with 31% of global exports (262 Mt out of 836 Mt total). Lignite is not exported. 78% of its 2009 anthracite production was exported (262 Mt out of 335 Mt total). In this respect, Australia is an exception to most anthracite exporters. Australia's global anthracite export share was 14% of all production (836 Mt out of 5,990 Mt total).

In 2021, Australia was the world's fifth-largest hard coal producer, following China, India, the United States, and Indonesia. Coal remained important to Australia's energy sector, representing 64% of domestic energy production, 32% of the Total Energy Supply (TES), and 53% of electricity generation. Moreover, Australia had the second-highest usage of coal in energy production and electricity generation among International Energy Agency (IEA) countries. Between 2010 and 2020, the share of coal in energy production dropped from 76% to 65%, in TES from 40% to 30%, and in electricity generation from 71% to 55%.

In 2020, Australia operated 91 hard coal and three lignite mines, with over 200 coal deposits. Most hard coal mines were in Queensland (67%) and New South Wales (30%), while lignite mines were mainly in Victoria's Gippsland Basin, notably the Latrobe Valley.

Coal mining in Australia has become more controversial because of the strong link between the effects of global warming on Australia and burning coal, including exported coal, and climate change, global warming and sea level rise. Coal mining in Australia will as a result have direct impacts on agriculture in Australia, health and natural environment including the Great Barrier Reef.

=== Natural gas ===
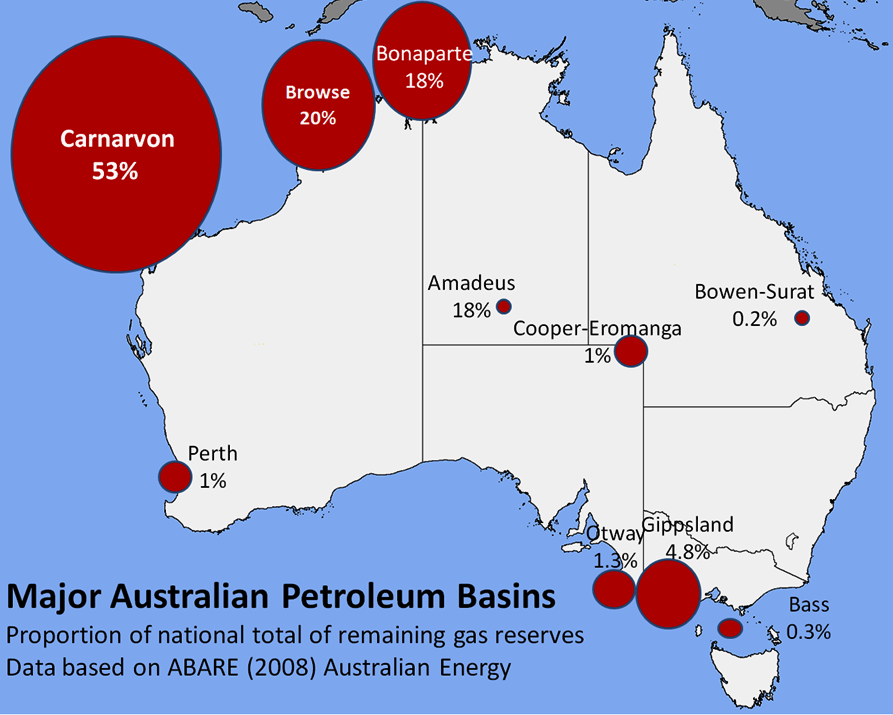
Proportion of national total of natural gas reserves, 2008

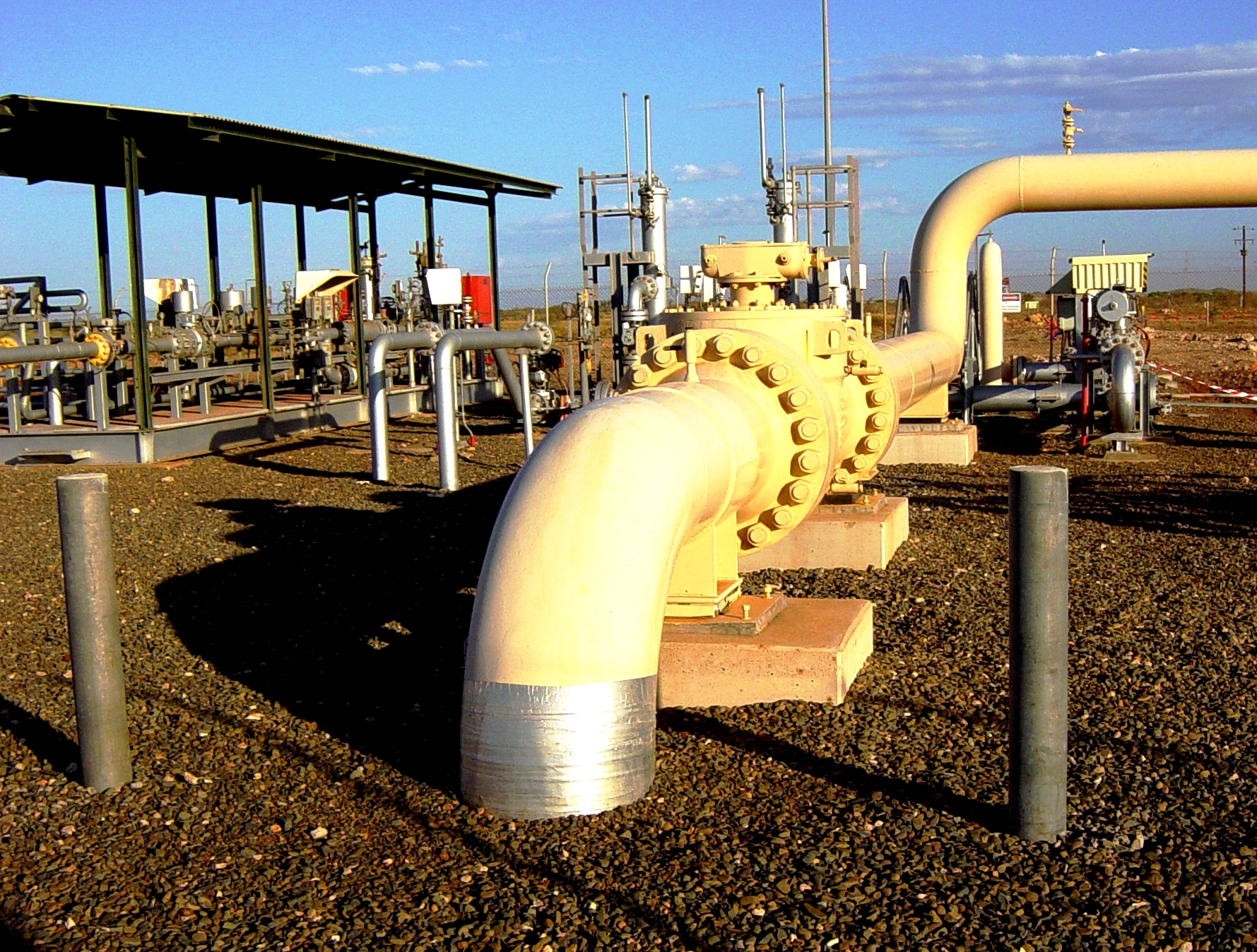
Natural-gas pipeline in Western Australia, 2004

Australia's natural-gas reserves are an estimated 3,921 billion cubic metres (bcm), of which 20% are considered commercially proven (783 bcm). The gas basins with the largest recoverable reserves are the Carnarvon and Browse basins in Western Australia; the Bonaparte Basin in the Northern Territory; the Gippsland and Otway basins in Victoria and the Cooper-Eromanga basin in South Australia and Queensland. In 2024-2025, Australia exported 73.8% of its domestic natural gas production. Natural gas exports totaled 4,425 petajoules, with liquefied natural gas exports declining by 1.8% from the previous year.Australia also has large deposits of coal seam methane (CSM), most of which are located in the anthracite deposits of Queensland and New South Wales.

In 2002, the Howard government announced the finalisation of negotiations for a $25 billion contract with China for LNG. The contract was to supply 3 million tonnes of LNG a year from the North West Shelf Venture off Western Australia, and was worth between $700 million and $1 billion a year for 25 years. The members of the consortium which operates the North West Shelf Venture are Woodside Energy, BHP, BP, Chevron, Shell and Japan Australia LNG. The price was guaranteed not to increase until 2031, and by 2015 China was paying "one-third the price for Australian gas that Australian consumers themselves had to pay."

In 2007, there was another LNG deal with China worth $35 billion. The agreement was for the potential sale of 2 to 3 million tonnes of LNG a year for 15 to 20 years from the Browse LNG project, off Western Australia, of which Woodside is the operator. The agreement was expected to bring in total revenues of $35 billion to $45 billion.

On 19 August 2009, Chinese petroleum company PetroChina signed a A$50 billion deal with American multinational petroleum company ExxonMobil to purchase liquefied natural gas from the Gorgon field in Western Australia, the largest contract signed to date between China and Australia. It ensures China a steady supply of LPG fuel for 20 years. The agreement was reached despite relations between Australia and China being at their lowest point in years after the Rio Tinto espionage case and the granting of an Australian visa to Rebiya Kadeer.

Succeeding governments oversaw other contracts with China, Japan and South Korea, but none have required exporters to set aside supplies to meet Australia's needs. The price of LNG has historically been linked to oil prices, but the true price, costs and supply levels are presently too difficult to determine.

In 2017 the Australian government received a report from the Australian Energy Market Operator and one from the ACCC showing expected gas shortages in the east coast domestic market over the next two years. The expected gas shortfall is 54 petajoules in 2018 and 48 petajoules in 2019. The federal government considered imposing export controls on gas to ensure adequate domestic supplies. The companies agreed to make sufficient supplies available to the domestic market until the end of 2019. On 7 September Santos pledged to divert 30 petajoules of gas from its Queensland-based Gladstone LNG plant slated for export into Australia's east coast market in 2018 and 2019. On 26 October 2017, APLNG agreed to increase gas to Origin Energy by 41 petajoules over 14 months, increasing APLNG's total commitment to 186 PJ for 2018, representing almost 30% of Australian east coast domestic gas market.

The price at which these additional supplies were to be made available was not disclosed. On 24 August 2017, Orica chief executive Alberto Calderon described gas prices in Australia as ridiculous, saying that prices in Australia were more than double of what was being paid in China or Japan, adding that Australian producers could buy gas overseas (at much lower world prices) to free up domestic gas to sell at the same profit margin.

In 2021, natural gas was a major component of Australia's energy sector, accounting for 29% of energy production, 28% of the total energy supply (TES), 19% of electricity generation, and 17% of total final consumption (TFC). By sector, natural gas use was highest in electricity and heat generation at 33.9%, followed by the industrial sector at 23.3%. Residential buildings accounted for 10.8% of natural gas consumption, while the service sector and transport sector had smaller shares at 2.9% and 1.3%, respectively.

Santos GLNG Operations, Shell and Origin Energy are major gas producers in Australia. Australia Pacific LNG (APLNG), led by Origin Energy, is the largest producer of natural gas in eastern Australia and a major exporter of liquefied natural gas to Asia. Santos is Australia's second-largest independent oil and gas producer. According to the Australian Competition & Consumer Commission (ACCC), the demand for gas in the domestic east coast market is about 700 petajoules a year. Australia is expected to become the world's biggest LNG exporter by 2019, hurting supplies in the domestic market and driving up gas and power prices.

=== Oil ===
Australia's oil production peaked in 2000, after gradually increasing since 1980. Net oil imports rose from 7% of total consumption in 2000 to 39% in 2006. Decreasing domestic oil production is the result of the decline of oil-producing basins and few new fields going online.

In 2021, oil comprises 52% of the Total Final Consumption (TFC) and 32% of the Total Energy Supply (TES). It contributes to 4% of domestic energy production and 1.8% of electricity generation. Oil consumption in 2020 was 892.3 thousand barrels per day (kb/d), with domestic transport consuming 65.4% of this amount. Industry, including non-energy consumption, accounted for 22.4%, international bunkering for 9.1%, buildings for 2.4%, and electricity and heat generation for 0.4%.

==== Oil shale ====
Australia's oil shale resources are estimated at 58 billion barrels, or 4,531 million tonnes of shale oil. The deposits are located in the eastern and southern states, with the greatest feasibility in the eastern Queensland deposits. Between 1862 and 1952, Australia mined four million tonnes of oil shale. The mining stopped when government support ceased. Since the 1970s, oil companies have been exploring possible reserves. From 2000 to 2004, the Stuart Oil Shale Project near Gladstone, Queensland produced over 1.5 million barrels of oil. The facility, in operable condition, is on care and maintenance and its operator (Queensland Energy Resources) is conducting research and design studies for the next phase of its oil-shale operations. A campaign by environmentalists opposed to the exploitation of oil-shale reserves may also have been a factor in its closure.

As of 2021, Australia no longer engages in the commercial production of oil shale.

=== Biomass ===
Biomass power plants use crops and other vegetative by-products to produce power similar to the way coal-fired power plants work. Another product of biomass is extracting ethanol from sugar mill by-products. The GGAP subsidies for biomass include ethanol extraction with funds of $7.4M and petrol/ethanol fuel with funds of $8.8 million. The total $16.2M subsidy is considered a renewable energy source subsidy.

==== Biodiesel ====
Biodiesel is an alternative to fossil fuel diesel that can be used in cars and other internal combustion engine vehicles. It is produced from vegetable or animal fats and is the only other type of fuel that can run in current unmodified vehicle engines.

Subsidies given to ethanol oils totaled $15 million in 2003–2004, $44 million in 2004–2005, $76 million in 2005–2006 and $99 million in 2006–2007. The cost for establishing these subsidies were $1 million in 2005–2006 and $41 million in 2006–2007.

However, with the introduction of the Fuel Tax Bill, grants and subsidies for using biodiesel have been cut leaving the public to continue using diesel instead. The grants were cut by up to 50% by 2010–2014. Previously the grants given to users of ethanol-based biofuels were $0.38 per litre, which were reduced to $0.19 in 2010–2014.

=== Hydroelectric power ===
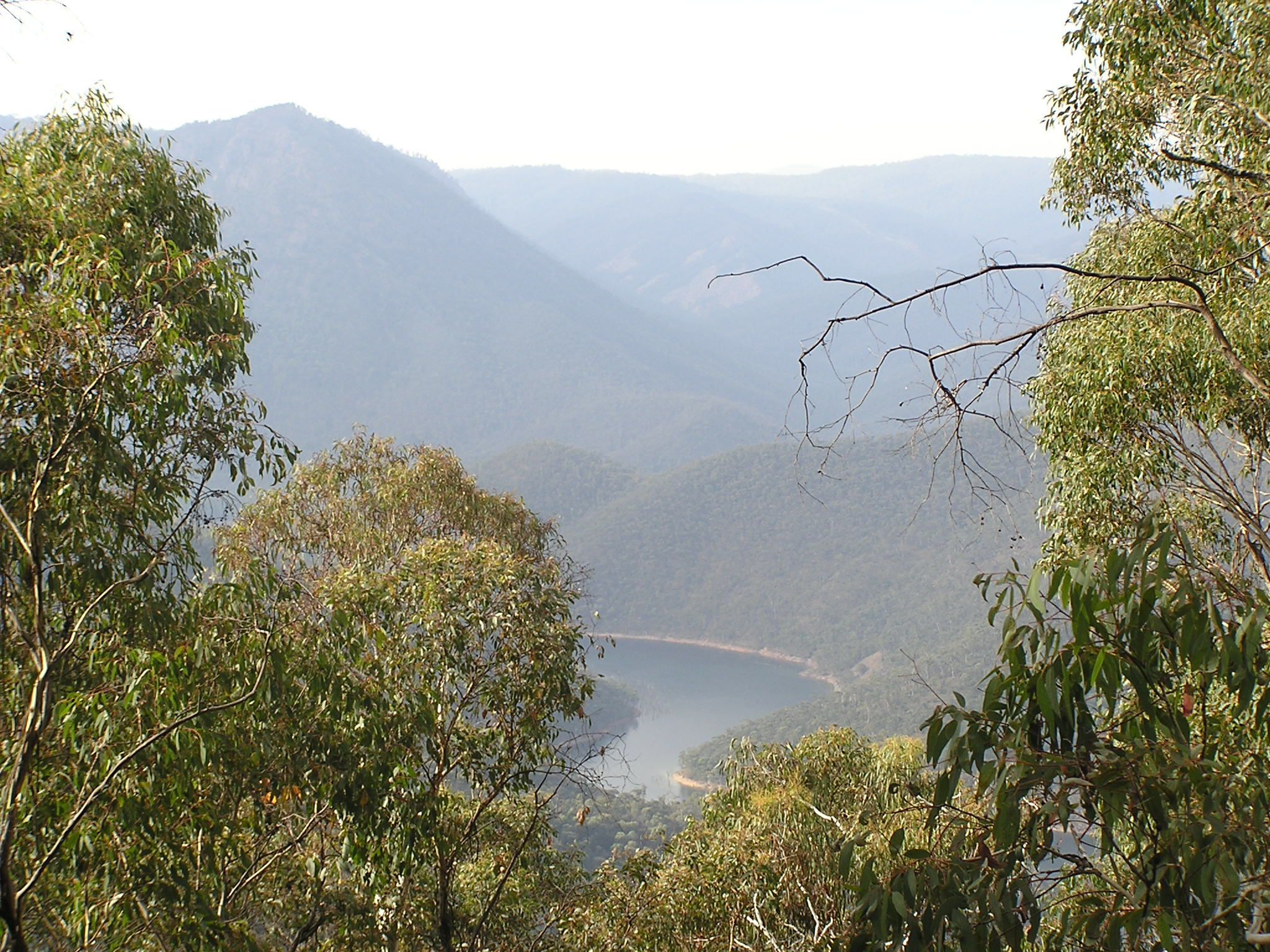
Talbingo Dam is part of the Snowy Mountains Scheme.

Hydroelectricity accounts for 6.5–7% of NEM electricity generation. The massive Snowy Mountains Scheme is the largest producer of hydro-electricity in eastern Victoria and southern New South Wales.

=== Wind power ===
By 2015, there were 4,187 MW of installed wind power capacity, with another 15,284 MW either being planned or under construction. In the year to October 2015, wind power accounted for 4.9% of Australia's total electricity demand and 33.7% of total renewable energy supply. As at October 2015, there were 76 wind farms in Australia, most of which had turbines from 1.5 to 3 MW.

=== Solar power ===
Solar energy is used to heat water, in addition to its role in producing electricity through photovoltaics (PV).

In 2014/15, PV accounted for 2.4% of Australia's electrical energy production. The installed PV capacity in Australia has increased 10-fold between 2009 and 2011, and quadrupled between 2011 and 2016.

=== Wave power ===
The Australian government says new technology harnessing wave energy could be important for supplying electricity to most of the country's major capital cities. The Perth Wave Energy Project near Fremantle in Western Australia operates through several submerged buoys, creating energy as they move with passing waves. The Australian government has provided more than $US600,000 in research funding for the technology developed by Carnegie, a Perth company.

=== Geothermal ===
There are vast deep-seated granite systems, mainly in central Australia, that have high temperatures at depth and these are being drilled by 19 companies across Australia in 141 areas. They are spending A$654 million on exploration programs. South Australia has been described as "Australia's hot rock haven" and this emissions-free and renewable energy form could provide an estimated 6.8% of Australia's baseload power needs by 2030. According to an estimate by the Centre for International Economics, Australia has enough geothermal energy to contribute electricity for 450 years.

=== Uranium ===
Australia has many Uranium deposits. However, Australia does not have any nuclear power plants and has laws preventing their use.

== Electricity ==
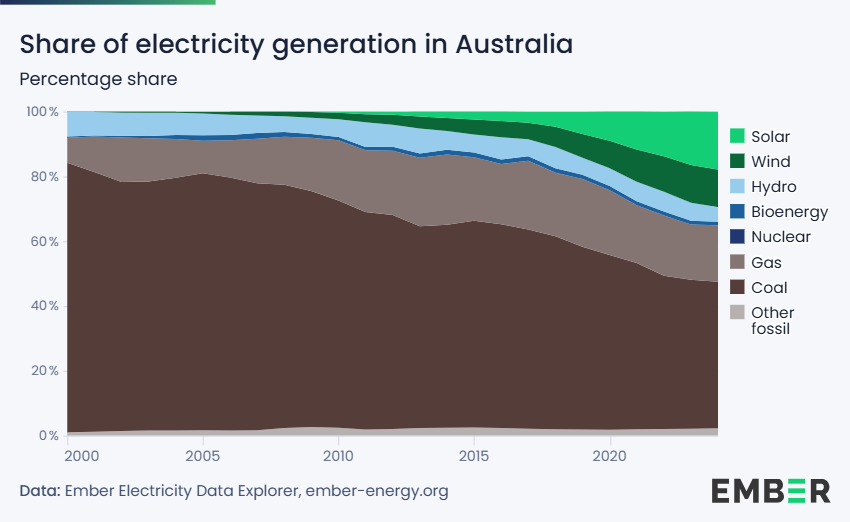
Share of electricity generation in Australia - percentage share

Since 2005, wind power and rooftop solar have led to an increasing share of renewable energy in total electricity generation. Due to its large size and the location of its population, Australia lacks a single grid.

Australian electricity generation, by fuel type (in GWh)
Fin. Year	Black Coal	Natural Gas	Brown Coal	Oil	Other	Fossil Fuels	Solar	Wind	Hydro	Bio Energy	Renew- ables
2009-10	51.5% (124,478)	15.0% (36,223)	23.2% (55,968)	1.1% (2,691)	1.0% (2,496)	91.8%	0.1% (278)	2.0% (4,798)	5.2% (12,522)	0.9% (2,113)	8.2%
2010-11	46.3% (116,949)	19.4% (48,996)	21.9% (55,298)	1.2% (3,094)	1.1% (2,716)	89.9%	0.3% (850)	2.3% (5,807)	6.7% (16,807)	0.8% (2,102)	10.1%
2011-12	47.4% (120,302)	19.3% (48,892)	21.7% (55,060)	1.2% (3,070)	1.0% (2,500)	90.6%	0.6% (1,489)	2.4% (6,113)	5.5% (14,083)	0.9% (2,343)	9.4%
2012-13	44.8% (111,491)	20.5% (51,053)	19.1% (47,555)	1.8% (4,464)	0.8% (1,945)	86.9%	1.5% (3,817)	2.9% (7,328)	7.3% (18,270)	1.3% (3,151)	13.1%
2013-14	42.6% (105,772.4)	21.9% (54,393.9)	18.6% (46,076.2)	2.0% (5,012.4)	-	85.1%	2.0% (4,857.5)	4.1% (10,252.0)	7.4% (18,421.0)	1.4% (3,511.3)	14.9%
2014-15	42.7% (107,639)	20.8% (52,463)	20.2% (50,970)	2.7% (6,799)	-	86.3%	2.4% (5,968)	4.5% (11,467)	5.3% (13,445)	1.4% (3,608)	13.7%
2015-16	44.4% (114,295)	19.6% (50,536)	19.0% (48,796)	2.2% (5,656)	-	85.2%	2.7% (6,838)	4.7% (12,199)	6.0% (15,318)	1.5% (3,790)	14.8%
2016-17	45.8% (118,272)	19.6% (50,460)	16.9% (43,558)	1.9% (4,904)	-	84.3%	3.1% (8,072)	4.9% (12,597)	6.3% (16,285)	1.4% (3,501)	15.7%
2017-18	46.6% (121,702)	20.6% (53,882)	13.8% (36,008)	1.9% (4,904)	-	82.9%	3.8% (9,930)	5.8% (15,174)	6.1% (16,021)	1.3% (3,518)	17.1%
2018-19	45.4% (119,845)	20.0% (52,775)	13.1% (34,460)	1.9% (4,923)	-	80.3%	5.6% (14,849)	6.7% (17,712)	6.0% (15,967)	1.3% (3,496)	19.7%
2019-20	42.2% (111,873)	20.8% (55,216)	12.7% (33,649)	1.7% (4,509)	-	77.4%	7.9% (21,033)	7.7% (20,396)	5.7% (15,150)	1.3% (3,352)	22.6%
2020-21	40.0% (106,251)	18.7% (49,783)	12.8% (34,060)	1.8% (4,662)	-	73.3%	10.4% (27,717)	9.2% (24,535)	5.7% (15,200)	1.3% (3,346)	26.7%
2021-22	37.2% (101,076.2)	18.1% (49,280.2)	12.0% (32,515.6)	1.7% (4,664.0)	-	69.1%	12.8% (34,686.7)	10.7% (29,107.8)	6.3% (17,010.9)	1.2% (3,190.3)	30.9%
2022-23	35.0% (96,173.9)	17.8% (48,865.2)	11.5% (31,459.1)	1.8% (4,864.4)	-	66.1%	15.3% (41,968.5)	11.4% (31,384.9)	6.1% (16,666.1)	1.1% (3,092.8)	33.9%
2023-24	34.5% (96,405.3)	17.3% (48,489.1)	11.5% (32,137.1)	1.7% (4,822.0)	-	65.0%	17.4% (48,600.2)	11.1% (30,992.0)	5.3% (14,960.1)	1.2% (3,301.9)	35.0%
2024-25	33.1% (93,360.3)	17.0% (47,951.6)	10.8% (30,417.2)	1.6% (4,534.6)	-	62.4%	18.9% (53,355.4)	12.6% (35,554.2)	5.0% (14,077.5)	1.1% (3,226.9)	37.6%

Australian Electricity Generation by Type FY 2024-2025
1. Black Coal (33.1%)
2. Natural Gas (17.0%)
3. Brown Coal (10.8%)
4. Oil (1.60%)
5. Solar (18.9%)
6. Wind (12.6%)
7. Hydro (5.00%)
8. Bio Energy (1.10%)

=== Electricity supply ===
Australian Electricity Generation in 2017 (data from the Australian Government Department of Industry, Science, Energy and Resources)

As of 2011, electricity producers in Australia were not building gas-fired power stations, while the four major banks were unwilling to make loans for coal-fired power stations, according to EnergyAustralia (formerly TRUenergy). In 2014, an oversupply of generation was expected to persist until 2024. However, a report published in 2017 by the Australian Energy Market Operator projected that energy supply in 2018 and 2019 is expected to meet demands, with a risk of supply falling short at peak demand times.

From 2003 to 2013 real electric prices for households increased by an average of 72%. Much of this increase in price has been attributed to over-investment in increasing distribution networks and capacity. Further price increases are predicted to be moderate over the next few years (2017 on) due to changes in the regulation of transmission and distribution networks as well as increased competition in electricity wholesale markets as supply and demand merge.

In 2021, Australia generated a total of 265 terawatt-hours (TWh) of electricity. The breakdown of the electricity generation mix was as follows: coal at 52.9%, natural gas at 18.8%, solar at 10.5%, wind at 9.3%, hydro at 5.6%, oil at 1.8%, and bioenergy and waste at 1.3%. Electricity consumption for the year was 239 TWh, with the industry sector consuming 43%, residential buildings and service sector buildings each contributing 27% to the total consumption, and the transport sector accounting for 3%. The increase in solar power has expanded the duck curve, and 4.5 TWh of solar and wind power was curtailed in 2024. The large increase in battery capacity complements variations for incumbent generators, but also occasionally set a high market price for electricity. A $7.2 billion four-year virtual power plant program was introduced in July 2025. It may yield 6 GWh of house batteries, and 4.7 GWh had been added by January 2026.

=== Renewable energy ===
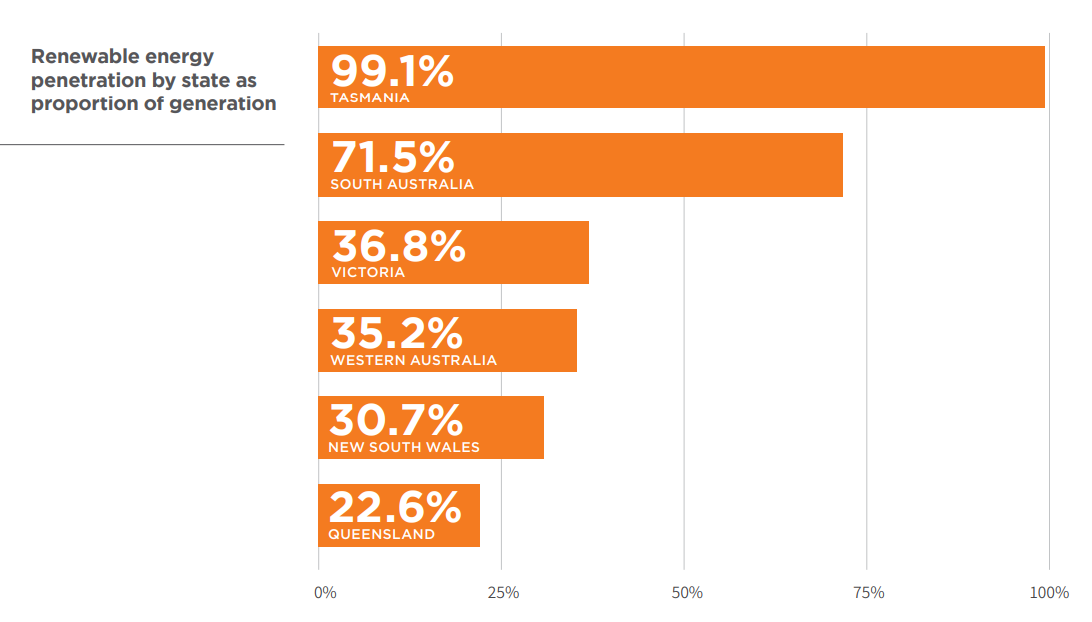
Renewable Energy by State in Australia, 2023

Renewable energy has potential in Australia, and the Climate Change Authority is reviewing the 20-percent Renewable Energy Target (RET). The production of 50 megawatts of wind power (power for nearly 21,000 homes annually) creates about 50 construction jobs and five staff positions. In recent years, wind and solar power have been the fastest growing source of energy in Australia. Geothermal energy is also growing, but at the present time, it only accounts for a small portion of energy in Australia.

=== Energy efficiency ===
Lower energy use could save A$25 billion, or A$840 per electricity customer, according to EnergyAustralia.

== Climate change ==
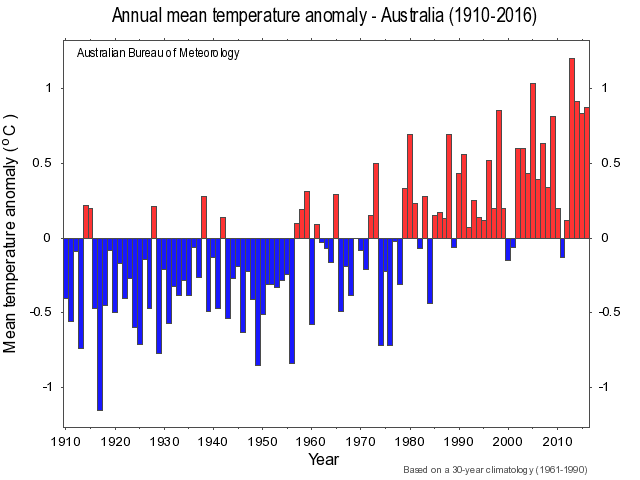
Graph of Australian temperature variability

Australian total emissions in 2007 were 396 million tonnes of CO_{2}. That year, the country was among the top polluter nations of the world per capita. Australian per-capita emissions of carbon dioxide in 2007 were 18.8 tons of CO_{2}, compared to the EU average of 7.9 tons. The change in emissions from 1990 to 2007 was +52.5 percent, compared to the EU's -3.3 percent. The per-capita carbon footprint in Australia was rated 12th in the world by PNAS in 2011.

Due to climate change, Australia is expected to experience harsher extreme weather events, mainly bush-fires and floods during summer. Rising sea levels are of particular concern for Australia, because most of the population lives on the coast (around 85%).

== Employment ==
Total employment in the electricity-supply industry (thousands of people) since 1984

Proportion of adult population employed in the electricity, gas, water, and waste services industries by statistical local area, as of the 2011 census

When analysing employment data, the Australian Bureau of Statistics classifies the electricity and gas supply industry as part of the Electricity, Gas, Water and Waste Services Division. That division is the smallest industry in Australia in terms of employment.

In November 2017, the number of people employed in electricity supply, which includes electricity generation, transmission and distribution, was 64,200 (47,700 males, 16,600 females). The number of people employed in gas supply was 11,200 (9,000 males, 2,200 females). The total number of persons employed in electricity and gas supply industries was 75,400. This represents about 0.67 percent of all employed persons in Australia. (Note: These figures are rounded to the nearest 100 persons)

In 2016, the major occupations in this division were truck drivers (9,900), electricians (7,700), electrical distribution trades workers (5,400), and electrical engineers (4,400).

=== Employment in renewable energy activities ===
In 2015–16, annual direct full-time equivalent employment in renewable energy in Australia was estimated at 11,150. Employment in renewables peaked in 2011–12, probably due to the employment of construction workers to build renewable energy facilities. However, it decreased by 36 percent in 2014–15, and by a further 16 percent in 2015–16. The decline is attributed to a decrease in the number of roof-top solar photovoltaic systems being installed on houses. Once construction of renewable energy facilities is completed, and only ongoing maintenance is required, employment falls quite significantly.

For most Australian states and territories the major contributor to employment in renewable energy is solar power. Employment in roof-top solar photovoltaic systems, including solar hot water systems, comprised half of all employment in renewable energy in 2015–16. Employment in large scale solar and wind power is driven primarily by installation activity, rather than ongoing operation and maintenance.

In Western Australia, 93 percent of all jobs in renewable energy are in solar power. The proportion of employment in biomass is significantly greater in Queensland (42 percent), where the sugar industry makes great use of sugar cane to generate electricity for sugar milling and to feed into the grid. Most jobs in Tasmania's renewable energy industry are in hydropower (87 percent).

Jobs in the renewable energy industry are forecast to grow substantially by 2030, driven by growth in electricity demand and new renewable energy capacity. Conversely, jobs associated with coal-fired power stations are forecast to decline as those plants age and close. Such job losses would disproportionately affect some regional areas, such as the Latrobe Valley in Victoria, Newcastle and the Hunter Valley in New South Wales, Gladstone and Rockhampton in Queensland, and Collie in Western Australia. However, it is expected that the number of jobs created in renewable energy will far exceed the number of jobs lost in coal-based generation.

== Public opinion ==
The Australian results from the 1st Annual World Environment Review, published on 5 June 2007 revealed that:

- 86.4% are concerned about climate change.
- 88.5% think their Government should do more to tackle global warming.
- 79.9% think that Australia is too dependent on fossil fuels.
- 80.2% think that Australia is too reliant on foreign oil.
- 89.2% think that a minimum of 25% of electricity should be generated from renewable energy sources.
- 25.3% think that the Government should do more to expand nuclear power.
- 61.3% are concerned about nuclear power.
- 80.3% are concerned about carbon dioxide emissions from developing countries.
- 68.6% think it appropriate for developed countries to demand restrictions on carbon dioxide emissions from developing countries.

== See also ==
- Asia-Pacific Emissions Trading Forum
- Australian Renewable Energy Agency
- Carbon capture and storage in Australia
- Effects of global warming on Australia
- Energy diplomacy
- Energy policy
- Energy in Victoria
- Fossil-fuel phase-out
- List of coal-fired power stations in Australia
- List of natural gas fired power stations in Australia
- Australian Renewable Energy Agency
