= National Electricity Market =

Australian wholesale electricity market

The National Electricity Market (NEM) is an arrangement in Australia's electricity sector for the connection of the electricity transmission grids of the eastern and southern Australian states and territories to create a cross-state wholesale electricity market. The Australian Energy Market Commission develops and maintains the Australian National Electricity Rules (NER), which have the force of law in the states and territories participating in NEM. The Rules are enforced by the Australian Energy Regulator. The day-to-day management of NEM is performed by the Australian Energy Market Operator.

NEM operations began on 13 December 1998 and currently covers Queensland, New South Wales, Australian Capital Territory, Victoria, Tasmania and South Australia. Western Australia and the Northern Territory are not connected to the NEM. The NEM comprises five regions, with the ACT being in the NSW region. Tasmania joined the NEM in May 2005 and became fully operational on 29 April 2006 when the Basslink interconnector was fully activated. The Snowy region was abolished as a region on 1 July 2008 and the components split between New South Wales and Victoria. The Northern Territory has adopted parts of the National Electricity Law, with the Australian Energy Market Commission becoming the rule maker for the Territory for parts of the National Electricity Rules from 1 July 2016. Western Australia is also considering adopting parts of the NER.

The NEM operates one of the world’s longest interconnected power systems between Port Douglas, Queensland and Port Lincoln, South Australia, with an end-to-end distance of more than 5,000 kilometres, and 40,000 kilometres of high voltage transmissions line. During the 2017–18 financial year, 203 TWh of electricity with a market value of AU$17 billion was traded through the NEM, serving 9.7 million end-use consumers. Approximately 40% of NEM generation is consumed in New South Wales, while Victoria and Queensland consume approximately 25% each.

FY19/20 rooftop solar capacity was 10,696MW, NEM capacity 49,832MW, and NEM demand 35,626MW.

== Operation ==
Exchange between electricity producers and electricity consumers is facilitated through a spot market where the output from all generators is aggregated and instantaneously scheduled to meet demand through a centrally coordinated dispatch process. This process is operated by the Australian Energy Market Operator (AEMO) in accordance with the provisions of Australian National Electricity Law and Australian National Electricity Rules.

Scheduled generators submit offers every five minutes of every day. From all offers submitted, AEMO’s systems determine the generators required to produce electricity based on the principle of meeting prevailing demand in the most cost-efficient way (see also Economic dispatch). AEMO then dispatches these generators into production by sending automatic generation control (AGC) target signals to each generating unit.

A dispatch price is determined every five minutes (termed Dispatch Intervals, abbreviated as DI) to determine the spot price for each 5-minute trading interval abbreviated as TI. Before October 2021, six dispatch prices were averaged every half-hour. There are 5 trading regions for each of the regions of the NEM. AEMO uses the spot price as the basis for the settlement of financial transactions for all energy traded in the NEM.

There is a maximum price that generators can bid in at. Under the Rules, the AEMC adjusts this maximum spot price MPC (market price cap) by movements in the consumer price index by 28 February each year for the rate to commence on 1 July. For the 2020-2021 financial year the MPC was $15,000/MWh. There is a further limit on the price called the Cumulative Price Threshold, which is the sum of value of all the TI's for the previous 7 days, calculated on a rolling basis. When this exceeds $224,600, AEMO caps the bids to a nominated value, currently $300/MWh. Whilst the price is capped in this manner, it is known as an Administered Price period. The process continues until the rolling average drops to allow normal trading without impinging the threshold too rapidly again.

Market Price Cap (MPC) – which was previously called the value of lost load (VoLL) – is the price automatically triggered when AEMO directs network service providers to interrupt customer supply in order to keep supply and demand in the system in balance. From 1 July 2022 to 30 June 2023 the MPC has been set to $15,500/MWh. From 1 October 2021 to 30 June 2022 was $15,100/MWh. The MPC for the 2020-2021 financial year was $15,000/MWh; $14,700/MWh in 2019-2020; and $14,500/MWh in 2018-2019. For the 2017-2018 financial year the MPC was $14,200/MWh and the Cumulative Price Threshold was $212,800. The maximum price was $14,000/MWh in 2016-2017, $13,800/MWh in 2015-2016, $13,500/MWh in 2014-2015, and $13,100/MWh in 2013-2014. From 2024 to 2025, the many new grid batteries were setting the high prices; $245/MWh average in Q2 2024, increasing to $478/MWh in Q2 2025.

The Rules also set a minimum spot price of minus $1,000 per MWh which is the market floor price. This negative market floor price allows generators to pay to stay online when the cost of staying online is lower than the cost of shutting down and re-starting their plants. For a renewable generator, staying online may also cost less than what generators receive from support mechanisms like the Renewable Energy Target scheme, plus their own costs. From 2024 to 2025, the wind and solar facilities were setting the slightly negative prices.

== Physical equipment ==
=== Generators ===
For comprehensive information of generators in Australia, see List of power stations in Australia.

=== Transmission network ===
The transmission network service providers (TNSPs) are operators of the high voltage electricity transmission networks. There are five state-based TNSPs servicing each of the regions in the NEM, with crossborder interconnectors linking the state grids at state borders to allow electricity to flow from one state to another. Four of the networks form a wide area synchronous grid except for Tasmania which is linked via HVDC. The TNSPs link generators to the 13 major distribution networks that supply electricity to end-use customers.

The TNSPs are:

Region	TNSP	Owner	Line length (km)
Queensland	Powerlink Queensland	Queensland Government	13,986
NSW (and ACT)	TransGrid	NSW Electricity Networks consortium (99-year lease): Caisse de depot et placement du Quebec (25%), Abu Dhabi Investment Authority (20%), Kuwait Investment Authority (20%), Utilities Trust of Australia (20%), Spark Infrastructure (15%)	13,957
Victoria	AusNet Services	Publicly listed company (99-year lease): Singapore Power (31.1%), State Grid Corporation of China (19.9%), publicly traded (49%)	6,553
South Australia	ElectraNet	State Grid International Development Asia & Australia Holding Company, YTL Power Investments, Hastings Utilities Trust, UniSuper	5,591
Tasmania	TasNetworks	Tasmanian Government	3,688

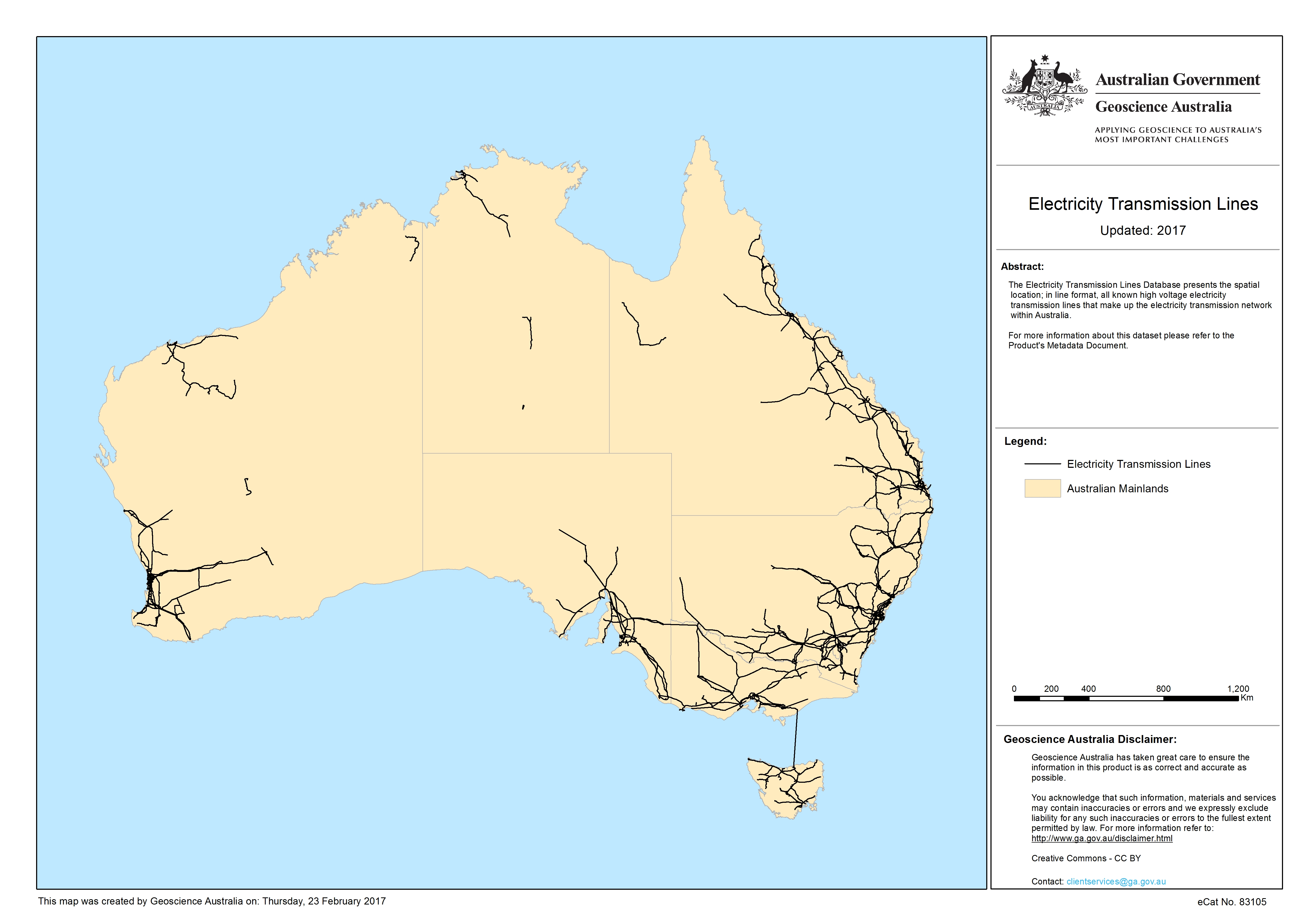
Transmission network

TNSPs participate in the Australian Energy Regulator's (AER) revenue proposal process, where submissions of the TNSPs, the AER and other interested parties are used to set the maximum allowable revenue (MAR) for the TNSPs for a five-year period.

The crossborder interconnectors are:

- NSW-Queensland — Terranora interconnector (Directlink) (HVDC)
- NSW-Queensland — Queensland – New South Wales Interconnector (HV AC)
- NSW-South Australia — Project EnergyConnect (HV AC)
- Victoria to New South Wales Interconnector
- Victoria-Tasmania — Basslink (HVDC)
- Victoria-South Australia — Heywood interconnector (HV AC)
- Victoria-South Australia — Murraylink (HVDC)

== System reliability ==
NEM reliability standards are established by the Australian Energy Market Commission (AEMC) Reliability Panel. These standards currently require that unserved energy per year for each region must not exceed 0.002 percent of the total energy consumed in that region that year.

The NEM is required to operate with defined levels of reserve in order to meet the required standard of supply reliability. Under current standards, AEMO is required to ensure 850 megawatts of reserve is carried across the entire NEM.

The reliability safety net provisions of the National Electricity Rules provide that AEMO must procure sufficient reserve to ensure that the reliability of supply meets the reliability standard. When reserves acquired by AEMO are dispatched they are bid in at the MPC thus setting the spot price at the maximum level.

== Financial markets ==
In addition to physical spot trading through the NEM, there is a separate financial trading market for electricity.

Prices in the spot market are highly volatile and the spot price can spike to several hundred times the average price for short periods. Therefore, buyers and sellers wish to lock in energy prices through financial hedging contracts. Under a “contract for differences” the purchaser (typically an electricity retailer) agrees to purchase a specified physical quantity of energy from the spot market at a set price (the “strike price”). If the actual price paid in the spot market by the purchaser is higher than the strike price, the counterparty to the contract (typically an electricity generator or a financial institution) pays the purchaser the difference in cost. Conversely, if the price paid is lower than the strike price, the purchaser pays the counterparty the difference.

There are numerous variations on the standard hedging contract available in the market, often containing complicated financial arrangements, for example one way option contracts, cap and collar contracts.

Hedging contracts are financial instruments. The financial market in electricity is conducted through over-the-counter trading and through exchange trading through the Sydney Futures Exchange (see Exchange-traded derivative contract).

The Sydney Futures Exchange lists eight standardised futures products based on Base Load and Peak-Period energy bought and sold over a calendar quarter in the NEM in New South Wales, Victoria, South Australia and Queensland.

== Regulation ==
=== Institutions ===
Three key bodies are the Australian Energy Market Commission, the Australian Energy Regulator and the Australian Energy Market Operator.

==== Australian Energy Market Commission ====
The Australian Energy Market Commission (AEMC) is currently responsible for determining rules and policy advice covering the NEM. The AEMC was established by the Australian Energy Market Commission Establishment Act 2004 (South Australia). Many of its statutory powers are derived from the National Electricity Law (NEL)

==== Australian Energy Regulator ====
The Australian Energy Regulator (AER) regulates the national electricity market. It is responsible for rule enforcement for the NEM as well as economic regulation of the electricity transmission and distribution networks in the NEM. It is also responsible for the economic regulation of gas transmission and distribution networks and enforcing the national gas law and national gas rules in all jurisdictions except Western Australia.

==== Australian Energy Market Operator ====
The Australian Energy Market Operator (AEMO) consists of six founding entities: National Electricity Market Management Company (NEMMCO), Victorian Energy Networks Corporation (VENCorp), Electricity Supply Industry Planning Council (ESIPC), Retail Energy Market Company (REMCO), Gas Market Company (GMC), Gas Retail Market Operator (GRMO).

AEMO draws together the functions carried out by these organisations, incorporating management of the NEM and the retail and wholesale gas markets of eastern and southern Australia, and it oversees system security of the NEM electricity grid and the Victorian gas transmission network. In addition, it is responsible for national transmission planning and the establishment of a short term trading market for gas.

AEMO was established by the Council of Australian Governments (COAG) and developed under the guidance of the Ministerial Council on Energy (MCE). It is run by a skills-based board of nine non-executive directors and the chief executive officer.

=== National Electricity Law ===
Due to the process of cooperative federalism under which the NEM was established, the National Electricity Law (NEL) is contained in a Schedule to the National Electricity (South Australia) Act 1996 (SA). The NEL is applied as law in each participating jurisdiction of the NEM by application statutes, for example the National Electricity (Victoria) Act 2005.

=== National Electricity Rules ===
The National Electricity Rules (NER) govern the operation of the National Electricity Market. The Rules have the force of law, and are made under the National Electricity Law. Up-to-date versions of the Australian National Electricity Rules can generally be found on the AEMC's website.

== Terminology ==
=== Formal terminology ===
Much of the terminology used in the National Electricity Market is derived from the National Electricity Law (NEL) and National Electricity Rules (NER).

==== Scheduled generator ====
A generating unit generally non-intermittent units above 30MW. They are required to submit price/quantity bids specifying their generation intentions, and must comply with dispatch instructions from AEMO.

==== Semi-scheduled generator ====
A generating unit which has a nameplate rating of 30 MW or greater (or is part of a group of generating units connected at a common connection point with a combined nameplate rating of 30 MW or greater), must be classified as a semi-scheduled generating unit where the output of the generating unit is intermittent unless AEMO approves its classification as a scheduled generating unit or a non-scheduled generating unit.

==== Market participant ====
This is a person who is registered by AEMO as a market generator, market customer or market network service provider under Chapter 2 of the NER.

==== Good faith bidding ====
Scheduled generators and market participants must make dispatch offers, dispatch bids and rebids in good faith (s.3.8.22A, NER).

=== Informal terminology ===
==== Gentailer ====
The term 'gentailer' or 'gen-tailer' is a portmanteau word combining the terms 'generator' and 'retailer'. This is a reference to the vertical integration of companies operating in the NEM, where generators own a retail arm. Four companies in the Australian NEM commonly described as gentailers are EnergyAustralia, AGL Energy, Origin Energy and Snowy Hydro (Lumo and Red Energy being retailer brands). ERM Power is a generator as well as small business retailer.

== Outcomes ==
It has been argued that the reforms have delivered considerable economic benefits. A government review (December 2006) stated that the reforms have underpinned significant levels of investment in energy supply (approximately $7 billion in electricity generation and $4.4 billion in electricity transmission), improved productivity (particularly capital utilisation) and delivered internationally competitive electricity prices for Australian industry and households. In terms of the climate change impacts of the reforms, experts have concluded that the outcome is increased emissions with respect to business as usual scenarios. This is due to the lower cost of coal fired generation compared to other generators, reduced emphasis on energy efficiency from lower prices, the failure to price greenhouse gas emissions, combined with market design and regulation that favours incumbents.

== 2017 pricing crisis ==
On 16 October 2017, the Australian Competition and Consumer Commission (ACCC) published a preliminary report into the electricity market highlighting significant concerns about the operation of the National Electricity Market, which is leading to serious problems with affordability for consumers and businesses. ACCC Chairman Rod Sims said:

"It's no great secret that Australia has an electricity affordability problem. What's clear from our report is that price increases over the past ten years are putting Australian businesses and consumers under unacceptable pressure. Consumers have been faced with increasing pressures to their household budgets as electricity prices have skyrocketed in recent years. Residential prices have increased by 63 per cent on top of inflation since 2007-08."

The ACCC estimates that in 2016–17, Queenslanders would be paying the most for their electricity, followed by South Australians and people living in New South Wales. Victorians would have the lowest electricity bills. On average across the NEM, a 2015–16 residential bill was $1,524 (excluding GST), made up of network costs (48%), wholesale costs (22%), environmental costs (7%), retail and other costs (16%) and retail margins (8%). The ACCC attributed the main reason for electricity price increases to higher network costs for all states other than South Australia, where generation costs represented the highest increase. "The wholesale (generation) market is highly concentrated and this is likely to be contributing to higher wholesale electricity prices." The ACCC accused the network operators of "over-investing" in poles and wires and gaming rules around revenue. The ‘big three’ vertically integrated gentailers, AGL, Origin, and EnergyAustralia, continue to hold large retail market shares in most regions, and control in excess of 60% of generation capacity in NSW, South Australia, and Victoria making it difficult for smaller retailers to compete. Retail margins increased significantly in NSW, but decreased in others.

In the September 2017 quarter, the price of electricity increased nationally by 8.9%.

== See also ==
- Competition law
- Competition and Consumer Act 2010
- Economy of Australia
- Energy policy of Australia
- Power purchase agreement
- Standing Council on Energy and Resources
