= Ministerial Council on Energy =

The Ministerial Council on Energy (MCE) was established as a committee of the Council of Australian Governments in June 2001. It was superseded by the Standing Council on Energy and Resources in June 2011.

During its time, it was responsible for a range of initiatives including:

- Equipment Energy Efficiency Program
- National Framework for Energy Efficiency
- Reform of Energy Markets - issued 11 December 2003

== See also ==
- Australian Energy Regulator
- Australian Energy Market Commission
