= ElectraNet =

ElectraNet Pty Ltd
- Company type: Private
- Industry: Energy
- Predecessor: Electricity Trust of South Australia
- Headquarters: Adelaide, Australia
- Area served: South Australia
- Key people: Simon Emms; CE
- Products: Electricity transmission
- Website: Official website

ElectraNet Pty Ltd, trading as ElectraNet, is an electricity transmission company in South Australia. It operates 5,591 km of high-voltage electricity transmission lines in South Australia.

ElectraNet is owned by Australian Utilities Pty Ltd (53.44%), State Grid Corporation of China (SGCC) (46.56%).

== Ownership ==
ElectraNet is held directly by Australian Utilities Pty Ltd (53.44%) and the State Grid Corporation of China (46.56%). In November 2025, the Macquarie-managed The Infrastructure Fund (TIF) signed a binding agreement to sell its 17.1% indirect interest in the company to the Australian Retirement Trust in a transaction reported by the Australian Financial Review to exceed A$600 million, ending more than two decades of TIF involvement in ElectraNet.

== Network planning ==
South Australia's electricity system is the most renewables-intensive in Australia, with wind and solar generation regularly meeting the entirety of state demand, and the state government has adopted targets of 100% net renewable electricity generation by 2027 and net zero emissions by 2050. In its 2026 Transmission Annual Planning Report, ElectraNet projected that the state's peak electricity demand could more than double over the following 15 years, rising from about 3.3 GW to more than 6.5 GW, driven by data-centre construction, defence-industry expansion, mining and minerals development, steel production at Whyalla and the Northern Water desalination project. The report set out a pipeline of priority transmission projects valued at around A$3.94 billion.

== Major projects ==
=== Northern Transmission Project ===
The Northern Transmission Project (NTx) is a proposed two-stage high-voltage line linking Adelaide to the Mid North and onward to Whyalla, intended to carry renewable generation from the Upper Spencer Gulf to load centres near Adelaide. The Australian Energy Regulator (AER) approved early work on the first stage in 2025, with an initial corridor extending from the Bundey substation, near Robertstown, to Whyalla.

Proposed routes through the Mid North drew opposition from farmers concerned about the impact of transmission infrastructure on grain-growing land in towns including Hallett, Kapunda, Saddleworth, Eudunda, Riverton and Roseworthy. In November 2025 ElectraNet announced that it would examine alternative corridors further east, after the AER granted a six-month extension to publish the project's Project Assessment Draft Report (PADR).

The PADR, released in May 2026, estimated that the first stage of NTx alone would deliver net market benefits of between A$356 million and A$640 million for South Australian consumers, primarily through avoided generation and dispatch costs and reduced involuntary load shedding. The draft report confirmed assessment of a new corridor further east in the Mid North, between Bundey substation and a proposed new substation in the Bolivar–Dry Creek area, following landholder feedback on earlier options. Public consultation on the PADR opened for a six-week period.

=== Eyre Peninsula and South East upgrades ===
ElectraNet's 2026 planning report also identified two further priority augmentations. The Eyre Peninsula Upgrade, anticipated by 2027–28 at an estimated cost of A$350 million, would involve building a new 275/132 kV Yadnarie North substation and converting the Cultana–Yadnarie lines from 132 kV to 275 kV operation.

== Sustainability initiatives ==
In March 2026 ElectraNet awarded a contract to Hitachi Energy for its first delivery of high-voltage switchgear free of sulfur hexafluoride (SF_{6}), described by the parties as the first such deployment by a major transmission utility in Australia. The order comprised three EconiQ live-tank circuit breakers rated at 145 kV and one rated at 72.5 kV, manufactured at Hitachi Energy's facility in Ludvika, Sweden, with delivery scheduled by April 2027. SF_{6}, conventionally used as an insulating medium in high-voltage equipment, has a global warming potential that Hitachi Energy gives as approximately 24,300 times that of carbon dioxide.
