= Australian Energy Market Operator =

Manager of National Electricity Market in Australia

- Founded: 2009
- Headquarters: Melbourne, Victoria, Australia
- Number of locations: Sydney; Brisbane; Adelaide; Perth; Canberra; Melbourne
- Key people: Daniel Westerman (CEO)
- Revenue: A$810 million (budgeted FY2026)
- Number of employees: ~1,800 (2025)
- Website: www.aemo.com.au

The Australian Energy Market Operator (AEMO) is a public utility organisation that manages gas and electricity markets in Australia. It manages the National Electricity Market (NEM), the Wholesale Electricity Market (WA) (WEM) and the Victorian gas transmission network. AEMO also facilitates electricity and gas full retail contestability, overseeing these retail markets in eastern and southern Australia. It is additionally responsible for national transmission planning for electricity and the establishment of a Short Term Trading Market (STTM) for gas.

AEMO is an independent, not-for-profit company with membership comprising state and federal governments (60% membership interest) and energy industry participants (40% membership interest). Around 1,800 people work for AEMO across Australia, including engineers, scientists, economists and IT and digital specialists, in addition to corporate support.

AEMO's functions are prescribed in its Constitution and in legislative instruments, such as the National Electricity Law and National Gas Law, as well as Western Australian provisions such as the Electricity System and Market Rules.

== History ==
=== Formation and early operations ===
AEMO commenced operations on 1 July 2009, superseding several state-based and cross-state organisations. These included the National Electricity Market Management Company Limited (NEMMCO), the Victorian Energy Networks Corporation (responsible for the operation of gas and electricity industries in Victoria), the Electricity Supply Industry Planning Council (responsible for the operation of the electricity industry in South Australia), the South Australian operations of Retail Energy Market Company, Gas Market Company, and Gas Retail Market Operator.

In 2015, AEMO became the market and independent power system operator for the Wholesale Electricity Market (WEM) in Western Australia.

=== Coal plant closures and system security ===
In March 2017, AEMO sought to reassure the public that the closure of the Hazelwood Power Station, which has a capacity of 1600 megawatts, would be offset by the availability of three mothballed gas-fired stations, which have a combined capacity of 830 megawatts, and large industrial businesses agreeing to time-shift their electricity use in the event of an emergency. The additional capacity would be provided by the Pelican Point Power Station in South Australia, Tamar Valley Power Station in Tasmania and Swanbank Power Station in Queensland.

In 2017, AGL Energy reaffirmed that it intends to close the Liddell Power Station in 2022. The closure of this and other coal-burning power stations in Australia led former Prime Minister of Australia Malcolm Turnbull to seek advice from AEMO on extending the life of a number of them, to head off future power shortages. Turnbull said the government had been advised that if the Liddell plant were to close in 2022, there would be a 1000 MW gap in base load, dispatchable power generation.

=== Renewable energy transition challenges ===
In May 2018, AEMO warned solar and wind projects in north-western Victoria of potential curtailment to their generation profiles. In particular, the 220 kV transmission line that links Ballarat, Horsham, Red Cliffs, Kerang and Bendigo was the focus of their announcement.

In order to simplify operations of the electricity market, AEMO suspended the spot market for wholesale electricity across the country in June 2022. That move came after AEMO issued warnings for possible power interruptions amid supply shortfalls and significant price rises.

In June 2023, AEMO sounded an alarm over the country's transition to renewable energy. Daniel Westerman was concerned that investment in renewables wasn't happening fast enough as two-thirds of coal-fired power stations were expected to shut down by 2030.

=== Recent developments (2024–2025) ===
In July 2024, the Australian Renewable Energy Agency (ARENA) provided up to $15 million to AEMO to accelerate delivery of AEMO's Engineering Roadmap, aimed at advancing operational capacity for renewable generation in the National Electricity Market. The funding supports accelerating operational readiness for major power system changes, foundational enablers for energy transition, and providing long-range visibility to investors on emerging power system requirements.

In August 2024, AEMO downgraded its warnings about power shortage risks in coming years, citing an improved outlook due to 5.7 gigawatts of new generation and storage developments. These included 3.9 gigawatts of batteries, 1.2 gigawatts of large-scale solar and about 400 megawatts of wind power. The improved outlook was also attributed to the decision to extend the life of the 2.9-gigawatt Eraring Power Station north of Sydney. However, CEO Daniel Westerman emphasised it remained "critical" that new generation and transmission projects be delivered on time.

In October 2024, the Australian Energy Market Commission initiated an expedited rule change process following a request from Delta Electricity to allow AEMO to accept cash as credit support from market participants. This addressed difficulties some generators faced in obtaining traditional bank guarantees due to evolving environmental, social, and governance policies among financial institutions.

In December 2024, AEMO received $728.1 million in federal funding over five years to upgrade its core digital systems, as announced in the Mid-Year Economic and Fiscal Outlook budget update. The funding aims to "enhance energy security and reliability" and includes upgrades to operational digital systems and strengthening of AEMO's cybersecurity posture.

In the 2024–25 financial year, AEMO reported a record-breaking surge in new renewable energy projects, with 29 projects totalling 4.4 gigawatts reaching full operation—double the previous year's total.

== See also ==
- Australian Energy Market Commission
- Australian Energy Regulator
- Energy policy of Australia
- Australian Renewable Energy Agency
