= Australian Energy Market Commission =

Australian regulator for national energy markets

statutory authority overview
- Formed: 2005
- Jurisdiction: Government of Australia
- Headquarters: Sydney
- Annual budget: A$24.3 million (2018)
- statutory authority executive: Benn Barr, Chief Executive
- Website: www.aemc.gov.au

The Australian Energy Market Commission (AEMC) was set up by the Council of Australian Governments through the Ministerial Council on Energy in 2005. The AEMC was established by the Australian Energy Market Commission Establishment Act 2004 (SA), and commenced in July 2005. The Commission consists of one full-time and two part-time Commissioners. Two Commissioners are appointed by the participating State and Territory jurisdictions and one Commissioner is appointed by the Commonwealth.

In 2008, the AEMC completed a review of Victoria's and South Australia's retail gas and electricity markets. In both states it was found that competition in the market was adequate for deregulation. The authority is also involved in inter-regional electricity prices and access issues.

== National Electricity Market ==
The AEMC has two roles in relation to the National Electricity Market – as rule maker and as a provider of advice to Ministers on how best to develop energy markets over time. The AEMC actively considers market development when it considers rule change proposals, policy advice and energy market reviews. These rules are binding on the Australian energy market and enforced by the Australian Energy Regulator.

== National Gas Law ==
The National Gas (South Australia) Act 2008 introduced the National Gas Law (NGL) which commenced in all jurisdictions except Western Australia on 1 July 2008 (replacing the Gas Pipelines Access Law).

The National Gas Rules cover gas transmission and distribution in all participating Australian jurisdictions are developed and maintained by the AEMC. The AEMC is responsible for rule making, market development and policy advice concerning access to natural gas pipelines services and elements of the broader natural gas markets. This is narrower in scope than for the National Electricity Market.

== AEMC Commissioners ==
Since its establishment in 2005, the AEMC Commissioners have been:

- John Tamblyn – Chairman and Commissioner (2005–2010)
- Ian Woodward – Commissioner; Chairman of AEMC Audit Committee; Chair Reliability Panel (2005–2010)
- Liza Carver – Commissioner (2005–2008)
- John Ryan – Acting Commissioner (2008–2009)
- Neville Henderson (2010–2018)
- Brian Spalding – Commissioner, Chair Reliability Panel (2010–2019)
- John Pierce – Chairman and Commissioner (2010–2021)
- Merryn York – Commissioner (2019–2022)
- Allison Warburton – Commissioner (2018–2022)

The current Commissioners are:

- Anna Collyer (appointed Chair 1 February 2021)
- Charles Popple (appointed 2018)
- Michelle Shepherd (appointed 2018)

== See also ==
- Australian Energy Market Operator
- Australian Energy Regulator
- Energy policy of Australia
- National Electricity Market
