= Australian Energy Regulator =

Government body for electricity and gas markets

Agency overview
- Formed: July 2005
- Headquarters: Melbourne
- Employees: 534
- Annual budget: $127 m AUD (2026/27)
- Agency executives: Matt Garbutt, Chief Executive; Clare Savage, Chair of the Australian Energy Regulator
- Parent department: Department of Climate Change, Energy, the Environment and Water
- Website: www.aer.gov.au

The Australian Energy Regulator (AER) is the regulatory authority for the wholesale electricity and gas markets in Australia and enforces the rules established by the Australian Energy Market Commission.

The AER was established in July 2005 as part of the Australian Competition & Consumer Commission. The next year all 13 bodies previously responsible for energy regulation had transferred responsibility to the AER. On 1 July 2026 the AER became a standalone agency. Decisions made by the regulator are subject to appeal.

== Functions ==
The AER's current functions are focused on regulating the natural monopoly transmission and distribution sectors of the national electricity market, monitoring the wholesale electricity market and enforcing electricity market rules. The AER's regulatory functions and powers are conferred upon it by the national electricity law and the national electricity rules.

Under the national electricity law and national electricity rules, the AER's key responsibilities at the present time include:

- regulating the revenues of transmission network service providers by establishing revenue caps
- regulating the revenues of distribution network service providers
- monitoring the electricity wholesale market
- monitoring compliance with the national electricity law, national electricity rules and national electricity regulations
- investigating breaches or possible breaches of provisions of the national electricity law, rules and regulations
- instituting and conducting enforcement proceedings against relevant market participants
- establishing service standards for electricity transmission network service providers
- establishing ring-fencing guidelines for business operations with respect to regulated transmission services
- exempting network service providers from registration.

== Staff ==
The AER board currently has five members who are statutory appointments. Part IIIAA of the Competition and Consumer Act provides that two of the members of the AER must be chosen by the Commonwealth, with three of the members chosen by the States and Territories.

Clare Savage is the chair of the AER, and Justin Oliver is the deputy chair. The remaining members are Jarrod Ball, Lynne Gallagher and Kate Symons. The chief executive officer of the AER is Matt Garbutt.

== See also ==
- Australian Energy Market Commission
- Australian Energy Market Operator
- Energy policy of Australia
- Australian Competition & Consumer Commission
