= Solar hot water in Australia =

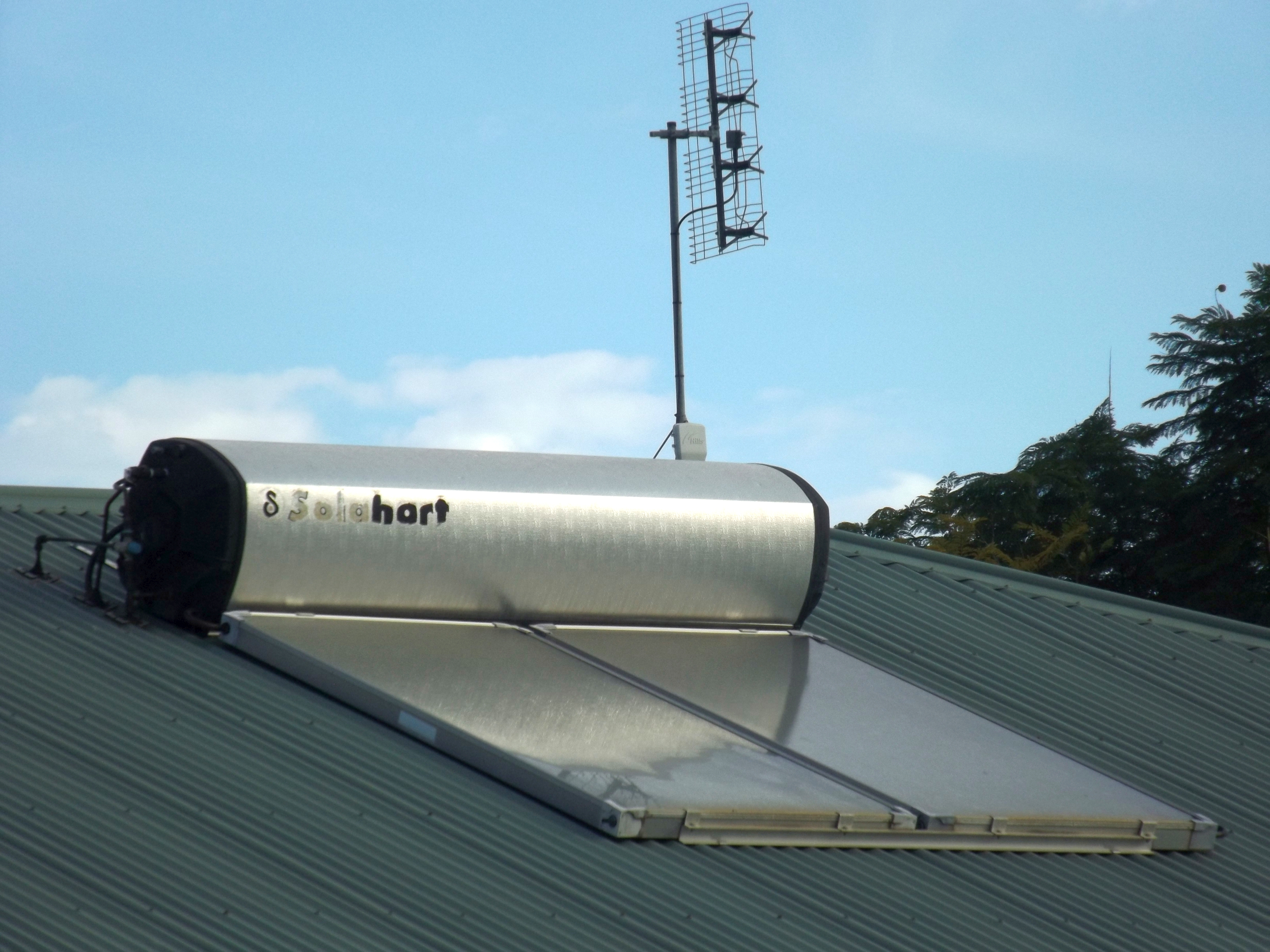
Rooftop panel in Laidley, Queensland, 2015

Solar hot water refers to water heated by solar energy, a renewable energy source derived from the sun. This process involves thermal collectors, often called solar panels, which absorb solar energy to increase the temperature of the water. The heated water is then stored in a reservoir tank for future use. Solar hot water systems are utilised for a variety of purposes, including domestic and commercial water heating, contributing to heating and cooling systems, and providing process heat for industrial applications.

In residential settings, solar hot water systems are typically installed in one of two configurations. The "close-coupled" or "thermosiphon" setup integrates the thermal collectors with the hot water storage tank on a rooftop, allowing heated water to rise naturally into the tank. Alternatively, the "split system" separates the thermal collectors from the storage tank, requiring a pump to circulate water between the collectors and the tank. This configuration provides more flexibility in system placement and is often used when roof strength or aesthetics are considerations.

Solar hot water systems are designed to reduce energy consumption, a significant source of greenhouse gas and carbon emissions; If the state of Victoria switched from electric to solar hot water, Australia's total greenhouse gas emissions would be cut by 20%.

The penetration of solar water heaters in the Australian domestic market is at about 4% or 5%, with new dwellings accounting for most of the sales.

During the 1950s, Australia’s Commonwealth Scientific and Industrial Research Organisation (CSIRO) carried out world leading research into flat plate solar water heaters. A solar water heater manufacturing industry was subsequently established in Australia and a large proportion of the manufactured product was exported. Four of the original companies are still in business and the manufacturing base has now expanded to 24 companies.

Heating of water is the largest single source of greenhouse gas emissions from the average Australian home, accounting for around 28% of home energy use (excluding private vehicles). The Australian government estimates that installing a climate-friendly solar-powered hot water system could help households save $300 to $700 of electricity bills each year.

== Australian Government's Solar Hot Water Rebate Program ==
The solar hot water rebate program for financial year 2009 offered a $1,600 rebate for the installation of solar powered hot water systems.

The rebate can be collected once the installation has been finished, if the household meets the necessary requirements stated below:

- The solar hot water system is a substitute for a previous electric heating system.
- The application and the installation process has taken place within the dates the rebate is offered.
- The household is a principal place of residence.
- The solar or heat pump hot water system is eligible for minimum 20 Renewable Energy Certificates (RECs).
- A licensed plumber or electrician is consulted for the installation.

Once the system is installed, the applicant has up to six months to submit the application form with the purchase receipt attached to it.

The mandatory renewable energy target scheme was created by the Australian government to mandate energy retailers to the usage of renewables. Each solar heating system is given a certain number of RECs depending on how effective it is and in which of the four climate zones one resides. Each zone is associated with a number of postcodes ranging across the whole continent.

Once issued, the RECs can be sold to energy retailers. While the market value of RECs is subject to variation, even residential-sized installations—depending on the current market conditions and the performance of the installed unit—often amount to payments of $900 or more.

== Solar hot water in the Australian states ==
=== ACT ===
The ACT Energy Wise program, run by the ACT Government, offers rebates to house owners or tenants that undertake energy saving improvements for at least $2,000 to their residence, such as insulation, inserting double glazed windows, installation of solar, or gas or electric heat pump water heating systems.

Only the first $1,000 of the cost of the installation of the water heating system (which replaces the existing electric heating system) can be used to calculate the $2,000 to be used on improvements. This means that to receive the rebate, the householder needs to spend another $1,000 on additional energy savings.

To be eligible the rebate of $500 the householder/tenant must:

- have an energy audit by HEAT ($30)
- be able to give detailed information about the residence's energy usage during the past year
- be able to show receipts from the renovations and improvements made
- present the application with attached receipts within six months after the energy audit
- not have received any other rebate under another program.

=== New South Wales ===
The New South Wales (NSW) Residential rebate program, running from 01/10/2007 to 30/06/2009, offered all house owners in NSW a rebate on systems that were replacing existing electric hot water systems.

More efficient systems that emit less greenhouse gas eligible for more RECs (Renewable Energy Certificate) generated a higher rebate.

Solar or heat pump hot water system, eligible for:	Rebate in $
20-27 RECs	600
28-35 RECs	800
36-43 RECs	1000
44< RECs	1200
5-star< gas hot water system	300

=== Northern Territory ===
PowerWater, the principal water and electricity supplier in the Northern Territory, offers an REC buyback scheme on installations of solar water heaters. The buyback must be applied for and assigned less than one year after the installation.

=== Queensland ===
The Queensland Government's solar hot water rebate scheme finished on 30 June 2005.

No state rebates are offered at the present; however, the Queensland government in 2007 announced the phasing-out of electric hot water systems commencing in 2010. From 2010, Queenslanders who needed to replace their household hot water system due to breakdown were no longer able to install electric systems and instead had to choose from gas, solar or heat pump options. Prior to this, the Queensland government had already banned the installation of electric hot water systems in newly constructed houses, a law which came into effect on 1 March 2006. The ban on electric hot water systems was repealed on 1 January 2013 and currently Queenslanders are permitted to install electric hot water systems.

The Brisbane City Council offered a rebate of $400 from 30 August 2008 to 1 June 2009.

=== South Australia ===
In accordance with the South Australian Government rebate scheme, starting 7 January 2008, all installations or replacements of a water heater must be a low-greenhouse one. The rebate scheme is aimed to give less fortunate people a financial incentive to use gas, heat pump or solar energy to heat water.

To be eligible for the $500 rebate, the householder has to hold at least one of the following concession cards:

- Centrelink Health Care Card
- Centrelink Pensioner Concession Card
- DVA Gold Card – Totally and Permanently Incapacitated
- DVA Gold Card - War Widow
- DVA - Extreme Disablement Adjustment

Following to the installation, the householder has up to three months to send in the application to receive the rebate if a criterion listed below is met.

The water heating system does not replace the existing one:

New system	No natural or LPG gas access	Gas access (natural or LPG)
Gas solar	Yes	Yes
Electric solar or heat pump	Yes	No
Electric or gas storage/instantaneous	No	No

The water heating system does replace the existing one:

New system	Gas	Solar gas	Electric element/solar, heat pump	Other types (oil, combustion…)
Gas solar	Yes	Yes	Yes	Yes
Electric solar or heat pump	No	No	Yes	Yes
Electric or gas storage/instantaneous	No	No	No	No

=== Tasmania ===
No rebates other than the Federal Government's are offered by the Tasmanian Government as of 2025

=== Victoria ===
Sustainability, Victoria’s solar hot water program, sponsored by the Victorian government, offers rebates to householders who have installed a system that abides the following criteria:

- acts as a replacement of a natural gas or LPG water heater with a solar-system
- is a solar-driven pre-heater, which is additional to an existing natural gas of LPG water heating system
- is a retrofit kit, which is additional to an existing electric water heater

New houses and buildings can get a rebate by selling the RECs their system is eligible for. The Commonwealth government is also offering a $1,000 rebate for the replacement of electric water heating.

Residential and community buildings:

Installation situation	VIC gov rebate $480–1500	Commonwealth Gov rebate $1000	RECs eligible
Replacing natural gas or LPG WH w/ gas-boosted solar system	Yes	No	Yes
Installing SWH as preheater to an existing natural gas or LPG WH	Yes	No	No
Adding solar panels to an existing off-peak electric WH either with a pump or by thermosiphon as a retrofit kit	Yes	No	No
Replacing a wood or briquette WH w/ gas-boosted or electric solar system	Yes	No	Yes
Replacing an electric WH w/ gas-boosted or electric solar system	No	Yes	Yes
New homes and buildings installing a gas-boosted or electric solar system	No	No	Yes
Existing buildings requiring a custom designed system for a large hot water load	Yes	No	No

Commercial buildings:

Installation situation	VIC gov rebate $480–1500	Commonwealth Gov rebate $1000	RECs eligible
New or existing building installing SHW	No	No	Yes

=== Western Australia ===
An installation of an environmentally friendly, gas-boosted solar water heater that replaces a previous water electric heating system is eligible for rebate from the Government of Western Australia.

System	Rebate in $
Natural gas-boosted solar water heaters	500
Bottled LP gas-boosted solar water heaters used in areas without reticulated gas	700

== See also ==
- Mitigation of global warming in Australia
- Photovoltaic engineering in Australia
- Renewable energy in Australia
- Solar Cities in Australia
- Solar power station in Victoria
- Solar power plants in Central Australia
