= Renewable energy in Australia =

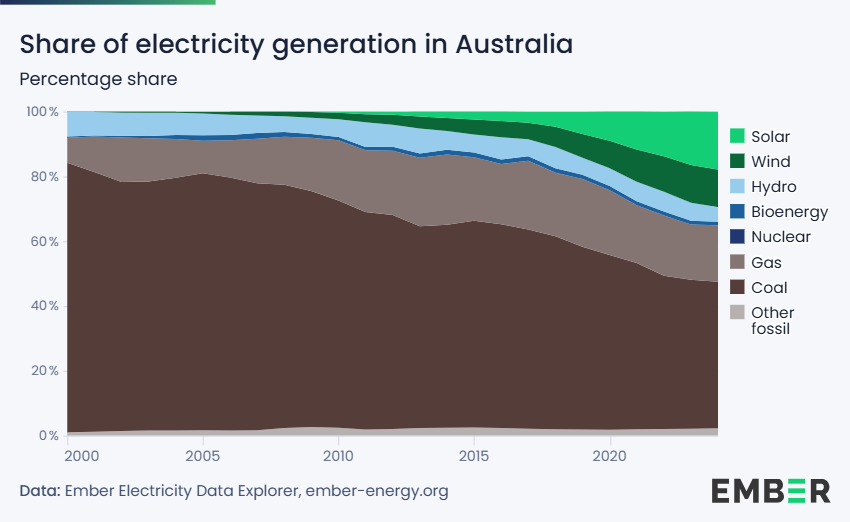
Share of electricity generation in Australia - percentage share

Renewable energy in Australia is based mainly on biomass, solar, wind, and hydro generation technologies. Over a third of all electricity generated in Australia is now from renewable sources, a proportion that is increasing in line with global trends .

Australia's Energy Market Operator AEMO reports the nation could phase out coal power before 2040.

== History ==
Australia has large fossil fuel reserves, and most states historically developed an energy network heavily reliant on coal. However, in Tasmania, the first hydro-electric scheme began producing electricity as early as 1916.

Hydro Tasmania is now the main energy provider in that state.

In mainland Australia, large-scale projects such as the Snowy Mountains Hydro Scheme have produced renewable energy since the 1950s.

Australian researchers at UNSW set up the first solar research lab in 1974, and developed the world's first solar cell in 1981. UNSW student Dr Zhengrong Shi started the first solar panel manufacturing company in China in 2001.

Small-scale solar projects such as the Rainbow Power company began producing energy for local Australian consumers in the 1980s.

== Recent growth ==
Renewables accounted for close to 40% of Australia's total electricity supply as of 2024. Wind and rooftop solar energy in particular have grown since 2010. Australia now boasts the highest uptake of rooftop solar in the world.

The growth in large-scale renewable energy has been stimulated by recent government energy policy in order to reduce Australia's greenhouse gas emissions and increase energy security.

The Australian Renewable Energy Agency (ARENA) was established as an independent government agency in 2012 to improve the competitiveness of renewable energy technologies and to encourage innovation in the industry.

Pros and cons of various types of renewable energy are being investigated, and more recently there have been trials of green hydrogen and wave power.

Australia ratified the Kyoto Protocol in 2007, and in 2016 became a party to the Paris Agreement, an international agreement that binds member countries to reduce the greenhouse gas emissions responsible for climate change. IPCC reports show parts of Australia are at real risk from climate change.

As of 2024, renewable energy is seen as a good investment; many companies now operate in Australia, including BP Solar, Eurosolar, Hydro Tasmania, Origin Energy, and Pacific Blue.

Australia renewable electricity production by source

Australian renewable electricity generation (gigawatt-hours), 2022
Source	Generation (GWh)
Wind	29,892
Small solar	21,726
Hydro	16,537
Large solar	11,740
Bioenergy	3,181
Medium solar	980

== Government policy ==
As in many other countries, renewable energy in Australia has been encouraged by government energy policy to limit climate change, reduce oil import dependency, and stimulate the economy.

A 2019 article raised concerns about environmental sustainability for future generations, as it seemed that the then federal government had no renewable energy policy beyond the year 2020. The Liberal Party's energy minister, Angus Taylor, stated that the government would not be replacing the Renewable Energy Target (RET) after 2020.

=== International agreements ===
Australia ratified the Kyoto Protocol in December 2007 under the then newly elected Prime Minister Kevin Rudd. Evidence suggests Australia will meet its targets required under this protocol. Australia had not ratified the Kyoto Protocol until then, due to concerns over a loss of competitiveness with the US, which also rejects the treaty.

In December 2016, Australia became a party to the Paris Agreement, an international agreement which binds member countries to address climate change, and started submitting emissions reduction commitments (NDCs).

=== Renewable energy targets ===
A key policy encouraging the development of renewable energy in Australia are the mandatory renewable energy targets (MRET) set by both Commonwealth and state governments.

An Expanded Renewable Energy Target was passed with broad support by the Australian Parliament on 20 August 2009, to ensure that renewable energy achieves a 20% share of electricity supply in Australia by 2020. To ensure this the Federal Government committed to increasing the 2020 MRET from 9,500 gigawatt-hours to 45,000 gigawatt-hours. The scheme was scheduled to continue until 2030. This target has since been revised with the Gillard government introducing in January 2011 an expanded target of 45,000 GWh of additional renewable energy between 2001 and 2020.

The MRET was split in 2012 into a small-scale renewable energy scheme (SRES) and large-scale renewable energy target (LRET) components to ensure that adequate incentive exists for large scale grid connected renewable energy. A number of states have also implemented their own renewable energy targets independent of the Commonwealth. For example, the Victorian Renewable Energy Target Scheme (VRET) mandated an additional 5% of Victoria's "load for renewable generation", although this has since been replaced by the new Australian Government LRET and SRES targets. South Australia achieved its target of 20% of renewable supply by 2014 three years ahead of schedule (i.e. in 2011) and has subsequently established a new target of 33% to be achieved by 2020.

Australia's climate goal includes reducing emissions by 43% by 2030, aiming for 82% of its electricity to come from renewable sources, aligning with the Australian Energy Market Operator's (AEMO) forecast of 83% renewables in the National Electricity Market by the same year. This effort is supported by individual targets and initiatives from states and territories, and the National Energy Transformation Partnership, established in August 2022.

=== Government bodies and mechanisms ===
==== Australian Renewable Energy Agency (ARENA) ====
ARENA was established by the Australian Government on 1 July 2012. The purpose of ARENA is to improve the competitiveness of renewable energy technologies and increase the supply of renewable energy through innovation that benefits Australian consumers and businesses. Between 2012 and January 2021, ARENA supported 566 projects with A$1.63 billion in grant funding.

==== Carbon pricing ====
In 2012, the Gillard government implemented a carbon price of $23 per tonne (2,200 lb) to be paid by 300 liable entities representing the highest business emitters in Australia. The carbon price will increase to $25.40 per tonne by 2014–15, and then will be set by the market from 1 July 2015 onwards. It was expected that in addition to encouraging efficient use of electricity, pricing carbon will encourage investment in cleaner renewable energy sources such as solar and wind power. Treasury modelling has projected that with a carbon price, energy from the renewables sector is likely to reach 40 per cent of supply by 2050. Analysis of the first 6 months of operation of the carbon tax showed that there had been a drop in carbon emissions by the electricity sector. There had been a change in the mix of energy over this period, with less electricity being sourced from coal and more being produced by renewables such as hydro and wind power. The government at the time presented this analysis as an indicator that their policies to promote cleaner energy were working.

The carbon pricing legislation was repealed by the Tony Abbott-led Australian Government on 17 July 2014. Since then, carbon emissions from the electricity sector have increased.

==== Clean Energy Finance Corporation (CEFC) ====
The new $10B Clean Energy Finance Corporation (CEFC) was created by the government in 2012, with the goal of overcoming barriers to the mobilisation of capital by the renewable energy sector. It was intended to make available $2B a year for five years for the financing of renewable energy, energy efficiency, and low emissions technologies projects in the latter stages of development. The fund was expected to be financially self-sufficient.

By the end of 2022, the CEFC had investments totalling around $11B, and had financed 42 wind and solar projects, which added 2.1 GW of solar and 1.5 GW of wind capacity. In 2022, as part of the "Rewiring the Nation" initiative, the Australian Government approved a capital increase of $11B for the CEFC, its first since the corporation's inception. As of 2022, the CEFC had facilitated over $38.65B in clean energy investments.

==== Renewable Energy Certificates Registry ====
The Renewable Energy Certificates Registry (REC-registry) is an internet-based registry system that is required by the Australian Renewable Energy (Electricity) Act 2000. The REC-registry is dedicated to: maintaining various registers (as set in the act); and facilitating the creation, registration, transfer and surrender of renewable energy certificates (RECs).

==== Feed-in tariffs ====
Feed-in tariffs have been enacted on a state-by-state basis in Australia to encourage investment in renewable energy by providing above commercial rates for electricity generated from sources such as rooftop photovoltaic panels or wind turbines. The schemes in place focus on residential scale infrastructure by having limits that effectively exclude larger-scale developments such as wind farms. Feed-in tariffs schemes in Australia started at a premium, but have mechanisms by which the price paid for electricity decreases over time to be equivalent or below the commercial rate. As of 2011, all the schemes in place in Australia were net schemes, whereby the householder is only paid for surplus electricity over and above what is actually used. In the past, New South Wales and the Australian Capital Territory enacted gross schemes whereby householders were entitled to be paid for 100% of renewable electricity generated on the premises, however these programs have now expired. In 2008 the Council of Australian Governments (COAG) agreed to harmonise the various state schemes and developed a set of national principles to apply to new schemes. Leader of the Australian Greens, Christine Milne, advocated a uniform national gross feed-in tariff scheme. Each state and territory of Australia offers a different policy with regards to feed-in tariffs.

=== Solar Sunshot program ===
The Solar Sunshot program, announced by prime minister Anthony Albanese in March 2024, is a $1B fund that delivers grants and production credits to manufacturers of solar panels, to increase the number made in Australia. (As of March 2024, 99% are imported.) The scheme will be run by ARENA. Provision will also be made to manufacturers of other components needed to create renewable energy, and the scheme is part of a plan to provide jobs for those workers currently employed in the coal industry. The new industries will be created in Portland and the Latrobe Valley in Victoria, and Wollongong and the Hunter Region in NSW.

=== Subsidies to fossil fuel industry ===
There is dispute about the level of subsidies paid to the fossil fuel industry in Australia. The Australian Conservation Foundation (ACF) argues that according to the definitions of the Organisation for Economic Co-operation and Development (OECD), fossil fuel production and use is subsidised in Australia by means of direct payments, favourable tax treatment, and other actions. It has been suggested these measures act as impediments to investment in renewable energy resources. Analysis by the ACF in 2010 indicated that these provisions added up to a total annual subsidy of $7.7B, with the most significant component being the Fuel Tax Credits program that rebates diesel fuel excise to many business users. This analysis is disputed by the Institute of Public Affairs (IPA) who argue that the ACF's definition of a subsidy differs from that of the OECD and that the fuel tax rebate schemes are in place to ensure that all producers are treated equally from a tax point of view. However, the IPA acknowledges that regardless of perceived issues with the ACF analysis, some level of fossil fuel subsidy is likely in existence.

=== State and territory policies ===
State governments have varied in their policies.

- In Victoria, the renewable energy targets were set to achieve 25% by 2020, 40% by 2025, and 50% by 2030. A subsequent announcement in 2022 outlined ambitious goals of 65% by 2030 and 95% by 2035. These targets are part of the state's Climate Change Strategy, which employs reverse auctions to finance more than 900 MW of renewable energy projects.
- The Australian Capital Territory (ACT) made significant strides in renewable energy, achieving 100% renewables in 2020—a target set in 2016 under its Climate Change Strategy 2019-2025. This achievement was facilitated by reverse auctions that funded renewable energy generation projects, cumulatively amounting to 650 MW.
- Queensland had set renewable energy targets of 70% by 2032 and 80% by 2035, announced in September 2022. These objectives were embedded within Queensland's Climate Action Plan 2020–2030, which also foresees the conversion of coal-fired power plants into renewable energy hubs by 2035. To facilitate this transition, a $62B clean energy plan has been put in place, utilising reverse auctions. In September 2025 the Liberal National government announced it would repeal these targets whilst maintaining the states emissions targets of net zero by 2050 and 75% emissions reductions by 2035.
- South Australia is committed to achieving 100% net renewables by 2030 and aspires to be a net exporter of renewable energy, setting a bold target of 500% by 2050. These ambitions are detailed in the Climate Change Action Plan 2021–2025, which focuses on government funding for renewable energy and storage solutions, rather than market mechanisms.
- Tasmania is on track to achieve its target of 100% renewable energy by 2022, a goal it achieved ahead of schedule in 2020. The state now targets the production of 200% renewable energy by 2040. This goal is advanced by the Climate Change Action Plan 2017–2021, focusing on enhancing government investment in existing hydropower assets, avoiding reliance on market mechanisms.
- The Northern Territory previously committed to a target of 50% renewable energy by 2030, set in 2019. This was then scrapped in March 2025 by the Country Liberal government, despite supporting the target whilst in opposition. The state was set to have 10% renewable energy by 2020, however in the 2024 calendar year renewable generation made up just 7.5% of the generation mix.
- New South Wales aims to have zero emissions across the state economy by 2050.
- As of 2018, Western Australia was the only state or territory yet to commit to a renewable energy target. In May 2019, 21 Western Australian councils have called on the state's Labor government to adopt targets for a 50% renewable electricity supply by 2030, and net-zero emissions by 2050.

== Timeline of developments ==
=== 2001–2010 ===
In 2001, a mandatory renewable energy target is introduced to encourage large-scale renewable energy development.

In 2007, several reports have discussed the possibility of Australia setting a renewable energy target of 25% by 2020. Combined with some basic energy efficiency measures, such a target could deliver 15,000 MW new renewable power capacity, $33B in new investment, 16,600 new jobs, and 69 million tonnes (150 billion pounds) of reduction in electricity sector greenhouse gas emissions.

In 2008, Greenpeace released a report called "Energy [r]evolution: A Sustainable Energy Australia Outlook", detailing how Australia could produce 40% of its energy through renewable energy by 2020 and completely phase out coal-fired power by 2030 without any job losses. David Spratt and Phillip Sutton argue in their book Climate Code Red that Australia needs to reduce its greenhouse gas emissions down to zero as quickly as possible so that carbon dioxide can be drawn down from the atmosphere and greenhouse gas emissions can be reduced to less than 325 ppm CO_{2}-e, which they argue is the upper "safe climate" level at which we can continue developing infinitely. They outline a plan of action which would accomplish this.

In 2010 the mandatory renewable energy target was increased to 41,000 GWh (150,000 TJ) of renewable generation from power stations. This was subsequently reduced to 33,000 GWh (120,000 TJ) by the Abbott government, in a compromise agreed to by the Labor opposition. Alongside this there is the Small-Scale Renewable Energy Scheme, an uncapped scheme to support rooftop solar power and solar hot water and several State schemes providing feed-in tariffs to encourage photovoltaics.

Also in 2010, ZCA launch their "Stationary Energy Plan" showing Australia could entirely transition to renewable energy within a decade by building 12 very large scale solar power plants (3500 MW each), which would provide 60% of electricity used, and 6500 7.5 MW wind turbines, which would supply most of the remaining 40%, along with other changes. The transition would cost $370B or about $8 per household per week over a decade to create a renewable energy infrastructure that would last a minimum of 30 to 40 years.

=== 2011–2020 ===
In 2012, these policies were supplemented by a carbon price and a $10B fund to finance renewable energy projects, although these initiatives were later withdrawn by the Abbott government.

Of all renewable electrical sources in 2012, hydroelectricity represented 57.8%, wind 26%, bioenergy 8.1%, solar PV 8%, large-scale solar 0.147%, geothermal 0.002% and marine 0.001%; additionally, solar hot water heating was estimated to replace a further 2,422 GWh (8,720 TJ) of electrical generation.

In 2015, the Abbott government ordered the $10B Clean Energy Finance Corporation to refrain from any new investment in wind power projects, saying that the government prefers the corporation to invest in researching new technologies rather than the "mature" wind turbine sector.

In December 2016, Australia became a party to the Paris Agreement, an international agreement which binds member countries to address climate change. It is an obligation for each to submit emissions reduction commitments, called Nationally Determined Contributions (NDCs), under Article 4 of the agreement. Australia submitted an NDC in 2022.

By 2017, an unprecedented 39 projects, both solar and wind, with a combined capacity of 3,895 MW, were either under construction, already constructed, or would start construction in 2017. Capacity addition based on renewable energy sources was expected to increase substantially in 2017, with over 49 projects either under construction, constructed or with funding secured for construction. As of August 2017, it was estimated that Australia generated enough to power 70% of the country's households, and once additional wind and solar projects were complete at the end of the year, enough energy would be generated to power 90% of the country's homes.

In 2019, Australia met its 2020 renewable energy target of 23.5% and 33 TWh (120 PJ).

With the 2020 targets being achieved, many of the Australian states and territories committed to a greater 40% target for renewable energy sources by 2030, including Queensland, Victoria and the Northern Territory.

=== 2021–present ===
Between 2000 and 2021, the proportion of energy from renewables grew from 8% to 11.5%, mainly due to growth of wind energy and rooftop solar since 2010.

In July 2022, a report published by the Australian Academy of Technological Sciences and Engineering estimated that Australia would be generating around 50 per cent its electricity needs from renewable sources by 2025, rising to 69 per cent by 2030. By 2050, power networks would be able to use 100 per cent green energy for periods. However the report said that investment was also needed, not only in new renewable sources, but in services needed during the transition period – hydroelectric power, batteries and probably gas for a while.

In 2022, 35.9% of electricity in Australia was generated from renewable sources, up from 32.5% in 2021.

In 2025 following the election of conservative governments in Queensland and the Northern Territory, both states cancelled their renewable energy targets. In September 2025, electricity generated from renewables overtook coal for the first time.

== By type ==
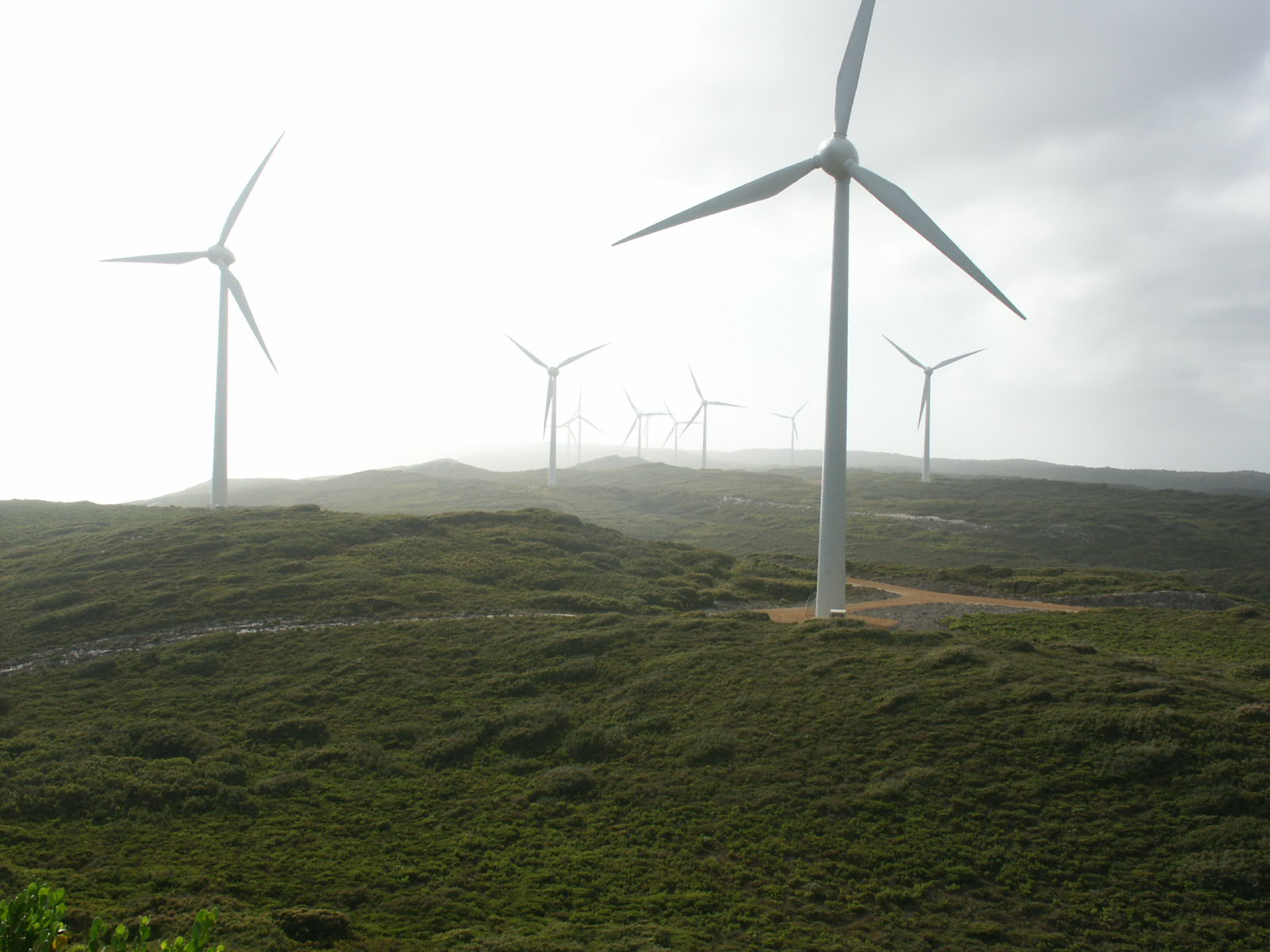
Albany Wind Farm, WA

Renewable fuel type	2016–17 (PJ)	2020–21 (PJ)	Change (%)	Share of renewables 2020–21 (%)
Biomass	205.4	171.2	−16.7	37.0
Municipal and Industrial waste	2.6	4.6	76.9	1.0
Biogas	15.0	18.0	20.0	3.9
Biofuels	7.1	6.2	−12.7	1.3
Hydro	58.6	54.7	−6.7	11.8
Wind	45.3	88.3	94.9	19.1
Solar PV	29.1	99.8	243.0	21.6
Solar hot water	15.7	19.7	25.5	4.3
Total	378.7	462.4	22.1	100.0

=== Biofuels ===
Biomass can be used directly for electricity generation, for example by burning sugarcane waste (bagasse) as a fuel for thermal power generation in sugar mills. It can also be used to produce steam for industrial uses, cooking, and heating. It can also be converted into a liquid or gaseous biofuel. In 2015 Bagasse accounted for 26.1%, or 25,100 GWh (90.2 PJ), of Australia's renewable energy consumption, while wood and wood waste for another 26.9%, or 25,800 GWh (92.9 PJ). Biomass for energy production was the subject of a federal government report in 2004.

Biofuels produced from food crops have become controversial as food prices increased significantly in mid-2008, leading to increased concerns about food vs fuel. Ethanol fuel in Australia can be produced from sugarcane or grains and there are currently three commercial producers of fuel ethanol in Australia, all on the east coast. Legislation imposes a 10% cap on the concentration of fuel ethanol blends. Blends of 90% unleaded petrol and 10% fuel ethanol are commonly referred to as E10, which is mainly available through service stations operating under the BP, Caltex, Shell, and United brands. In partnership with the Queensland Government, the Canegrowers organisation launched a regional billboard campaign in March 2007 to promote the renewable fuels industry. Over 100 million litres (26 million US gallons) of the new BP Unleaded with renewable ethanol has now been sold to Queensland motorists. Biodiesel produced from oilseed crops or recycled cooking oil may be a better prospect than ethanol, given the nation's heavy reliance on road transport, and the growing popularity of fuel-efficient diesel cars. Australian cities are some of the most car-dependent cities in the world, and legislations involving vehicle pollution within the country are considered relatively lax.

Australian bioenergy electricity generation by year
Year	2013	2014	2015	2016	2017	2018	2019	2020	2021	2022	2023	2024
Generation (GWh)	2400	2400	3200	3608	3713	3412	3314	3164	3187	3181	3248	3599
% of Renewable Electricity	6.9	7.6	9.1	8.6	9.7	7.1	6.0	5.0	4.3	3.8	3.5	3.7
% of Total Electricity	1.02	1.02	1.34	1.49	1.65	1.5	1.4	1.4	1.4	1.4	1.4	1.5

=== Geothermal energy ===
In Australia, geothermal energy is a natural resource which is not widely used as a form of energy. However, there are known and potential locations near the centre of the country in which geothermal activity is detectable. Exploratory geothermal wells have been drilled to test for the presence of high temperature geothermal activity and such high levels were detected. As a result, projects will eventuate in the coming years and more exploration is expected at potential locations.

South Australia has been described as "Australia's hot rock haven" and this emissions free and renewable energy form could provide an estimated 6.8% of Australia's base load power needs by 2030. According to an estimate by the Centre for International Economics, Australia has enough geothermal energy to contribute electricity for 450 years.

There are currently 19 companies Australia-wide spending $654M in exploration programmes in 141 areas. In South Australia, which is expected to dominate the sector's growth, 12 companies have already applied for 116 areas and can be expected to invest $524M (US$435M) in their projects by the next six years. Ten projects are expected to achieve successful exploration and heat flows, by 2010, with at least three power generation demonstration projects coming on stream by 2012. A geothermal power plant is generating 80 kW of electricity at Birdsville, in southwest Queensland.

=== Green hydrogen ===
Investigations into green hydrogen production has been funded by the Australian Renewable Energy Agency (ARENA), an independent federal government agency, mostly in Western Australia. In 2018, it funded Australia's first green hydrogen project at Jandakot, called the ATCO Hydrogen Microgrid. Solar energy is used to separate hydrogen molecules from water to create renewable hydrogen. This project involved a trial to produce, store, and use green hydrogen to power a microgrid, and to assess the feasibility of a similar process on a larger scale. The total project cost was $3.53M, with $1.79M coming from ARENA, and the project was completed on 30 November 2019.

In South Australia, the Whyalla Hydrogen Facility was a proposed 250 MWe hydrogen electrolyser, a 200 MW combined cycle gas turbine generator, and 3,600-tonne (7.9-million-pound) hydrogen storage facility. Hydrogen Power South Australia, a government enterprise, was established to own and operate the plant. The project was intended to support the decarbonisation of the Whyalla Steelworks, but the original plan was effectively scrapped in February 2025 after the steelworks' transition to green steel was delayed. A South Australian Government company called Hydrogen Power South Australia was established to own and operate the plant, which is expected to be completed in 2025 and begin operations in 2026. Once it is up and running, it will supply power to the Whyalla Steelworks, which will then produce green steel.

In March 2024 funding was provided by ARENA for a feasibility study into the East Kimberley Clean Energy Project, in which a 900-megawatt solar farm at Lake Argyle, Western Australia, would create green hydrogen gas. This would be piped north to Wyndham, where it would be converted into ammonia and exported to Asia. Total output is estimated at 250,000 tonnes (550 million pounds) per annum.

=== Hydro power ===
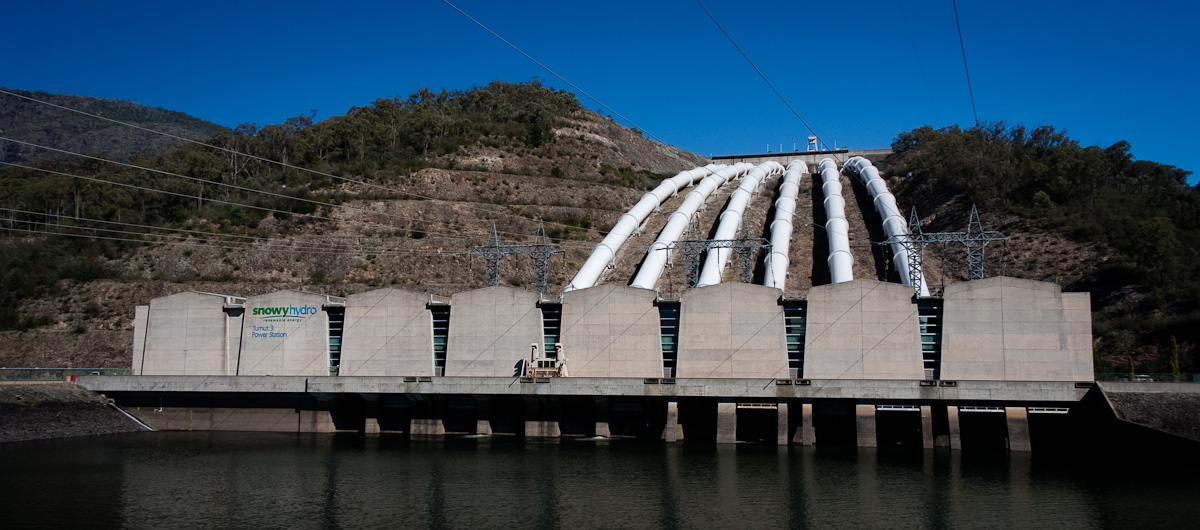
Tumut 3, the largest hydropower station in Australia with 1,800 MW. Part of the Snowy Mountains Scheme.

In 2022, hydro power supplied 19.7% of Australia's renewable electricity generation or 7.1% of Australia's total electricity generation.

The largest hydro power system in Australia is the Snowy Mountains Scheme constructed between 1949 and 1974, which consists of 16 major dams and 7 major power stations, and has a total generating capacity of 3,800 MW. The scheme generates on average 4,500 GWh (16,000 TJ) electricity per year. A major extension of the scheme is ongoing as of 2020. Dubbed Snowy 2.0, it consists in adding a 2,000 MW pumped hydro storage capacity by connecting two existing reservoirs with tunnels and an underground power station. It is due to complete by 2026.

Hydro Tasmania operates 30 power stations and 15 dams, with a total generating capacity of 2,600 MW, and generates an average of 9,000 GWh (32,000 TJ) of electricity per year. There are also plans to upgrade Tasmania's hydro power system to give it the capability to function as pumped hydro storage under the 'Battery of the Nation' initiative.

Australian hydroelectricity generation by year
Year	2013	2014	2015	2016	2017	2018	2019	2020	2021	2022	2023	2024
Generation (GWh)	19243	14555	14046	17747	12920	17002	14166	14638	16128	16537	15307	13295
% of Renewable Electricity	55.4	45.9	40.1	42.3	33.9	35.2	25.7	23.3	21.6	19.7	16.1	13.7
% of Total Electricity	8.2	6.2	5.9	7.3	5.7	7.5	6.2	6.4	7.0	7.1	6.4	5.5

=== Solar photovoltaics ===
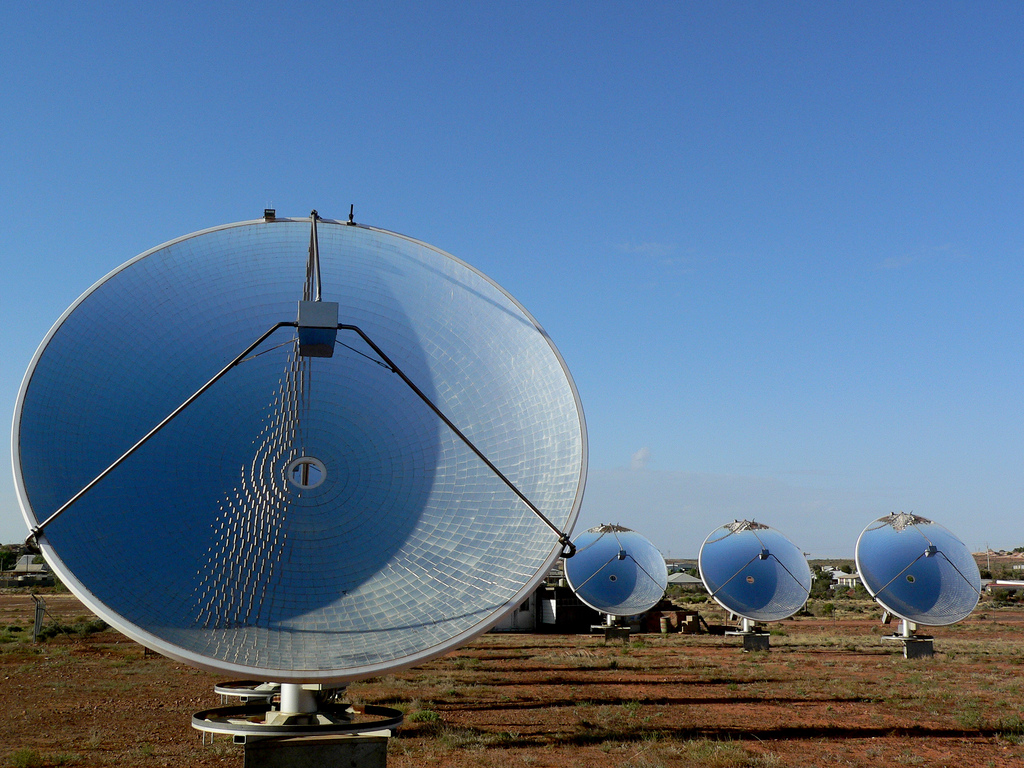
White Cliffs Solar Power Station, Australia's first solar power station operated between 1981 and 2004

In 2022, solar power supplied around 41.0% of Australia's renewable electricity and around 14.7% of Australia's total electricity. Twelve new large-scale (>5 MW) solar farms were commissioned in 2021 with a combined capacity of 840 MW, bringing the total installed large-scale capacity to almost 6.5 GW. As of the end of 2022, 48 large-scale solar farms were either under construction or financial committed nationally.

Small-scale solar power (<100 kW) is the dominant contributor to Australia's overall solar electricity production as of 2022, producing 63% of solar's total electricity output (21,726 GWh or 78,210 TJ of 34,446 GWh or 124,010 TJ total). In 2022, 2.7 GW of new small-scale capacity was installed across 310,352 installations, bringing total small-scale capacity to 19.39 GW.

As of December 2022, Australia's over 3.36 million solar PV installations had a combined capacity of 29,683 MW of which 3,922 MW were installed in the preceding 12 months.

Top 5 operational large-scale solar farms by capacity (MW)
Rank	Name	Capacity (MW)	Commissioned
1	Darlington Point Solar Farm	275	2021
2	Limondale Solar Farm	220	2021
3	Kiamal solar farm	200	2021
4	Sunraysia Solar Farm	200	2021
5	Wellington Solar Farm	174	2021

Australian solar PV electricity generation by year
Year	2013	2014	2015	2016	2017	2018	2019	2020	2021	2022	2023	2024
Generation (GWh)	3820	4952	5931	7659	8615	11694	18126	22510	28561	34446	43013	47802
% of Renewable Electricity	11.0	15.6	16.9	18.3	22.6	24.2	32.9	35.8	38.3	41.0	46.2	49.1
% of Total Electricity	1.6	2.1	2.5	3.2	3.8	5.2	7.8	9.9	12.4	14.7	18.2	19.6

=== Solar thermal energy ===
==== Solar water heating ====
Australia has developed world leading solar thermal technologies, but with only very low levels of actual use. Domestic solar water heating is the most common solar thermal technology. During the 1950s, Australia's Commonwealth Scientific and Industrial Research Organisation (CSIRO) carried out world leading research into flat plate solar water heaters. A solar water heater manufacturing industry was subsequently established in Australia and a large proportion of the manufactured product was exported. Four of the original companies are still in business and the manufacturing base has now expanded to 24 companies. Despite an excellent solar resource, the penetration of solar water heaters in the Australian domestic market was only about 5% in 2006, with new dwellings accounting for most sales. By 2014, around 14% of Australian households had solar hot water installed It is estimated that by installing a solar hot water system, it could reduce a family's CO_{2} emissions up to 3 tonnes (6,600 lb) per year while saving up to 80% of the energy costs for water heating.

While solar water heating saves a significant amount of energy, they are generally omitted from measures of renewable energy production as they do not actually produce electricity. Based on the installed base in Australia as of October 2010, it was calculated that solar hot water units would account for about 7.4% of clean energy production if they were included in the overall figures.

==== Solar thermal power ====
The CSIRO's National Solar Energy Centre in Newcastle, New South Wales houses a 500 kW (thermal) and a 1.5 MW (thermal) solar central receiver system, which are used as research and development facilities.

The Australian National University (ANU) has worked on dish concentrator systems since the early 1970s, and early work lead to the construction of the White Cliffs Solar Power Station. In 1994, the first 'Big Dish' 400 m^{2} (4,300 sq ft) solar concentrator was completed on the ANU campus. In 2005, the dish technology developed by ANU was exclusively licensed to solar technology company Wizard Power. In collaboration with ANU, the company built and demonstrated the 500 m^{2} (5,400 sq ft) commercial Big Dish design in Canberra, with this having been completed in 2009. The company had planned to construct the Solar Oasis demonstration site in Whyalla, South Australia as the first commercial implementation of the technology, using 300 Wizard Power Big Dish solar thermal concentrators to deliver a 40 MWe solar thermal power plant. Construction was expected to commence in mid-late 2013, but following the withdrawal of Commonwealth funding in June 2013, the project was halted with Wizard Power ceasing operations in September 2013.

Research activities at the University of Sydney and University of New South Wales have spun off into Solar Heat and Power (now Areva Solar), which was building a major project at Liddell Power Station in the Hunter Valley. The CSIRO Division of Energy Technology has opened a major solar energy centre in Newcastle that has a tower system purchased from Solar Heat and Power and a prototype trough concentrator array developed in collaboration with the ANU.

=== Wave power ===
Several projects for harvesting the power of the ocean were attempted:

- Oceanlinx trialled a wave energy system at Port Kembla, but went bankrupt.
- Carnegie Corp of Western Australia tried a method of using energy captured from passing waves, CETO.
- BioPower Systems is developing its bioWAVE system anchored to the seabed that would generate electricity through the movement of buoyant blades as waves pass, in a swaying motion similar to the way sea plants, such as kelp, move. It expects to complete pilot wave and tidal projects off northern Tasmania this year.

=== Wind power ===
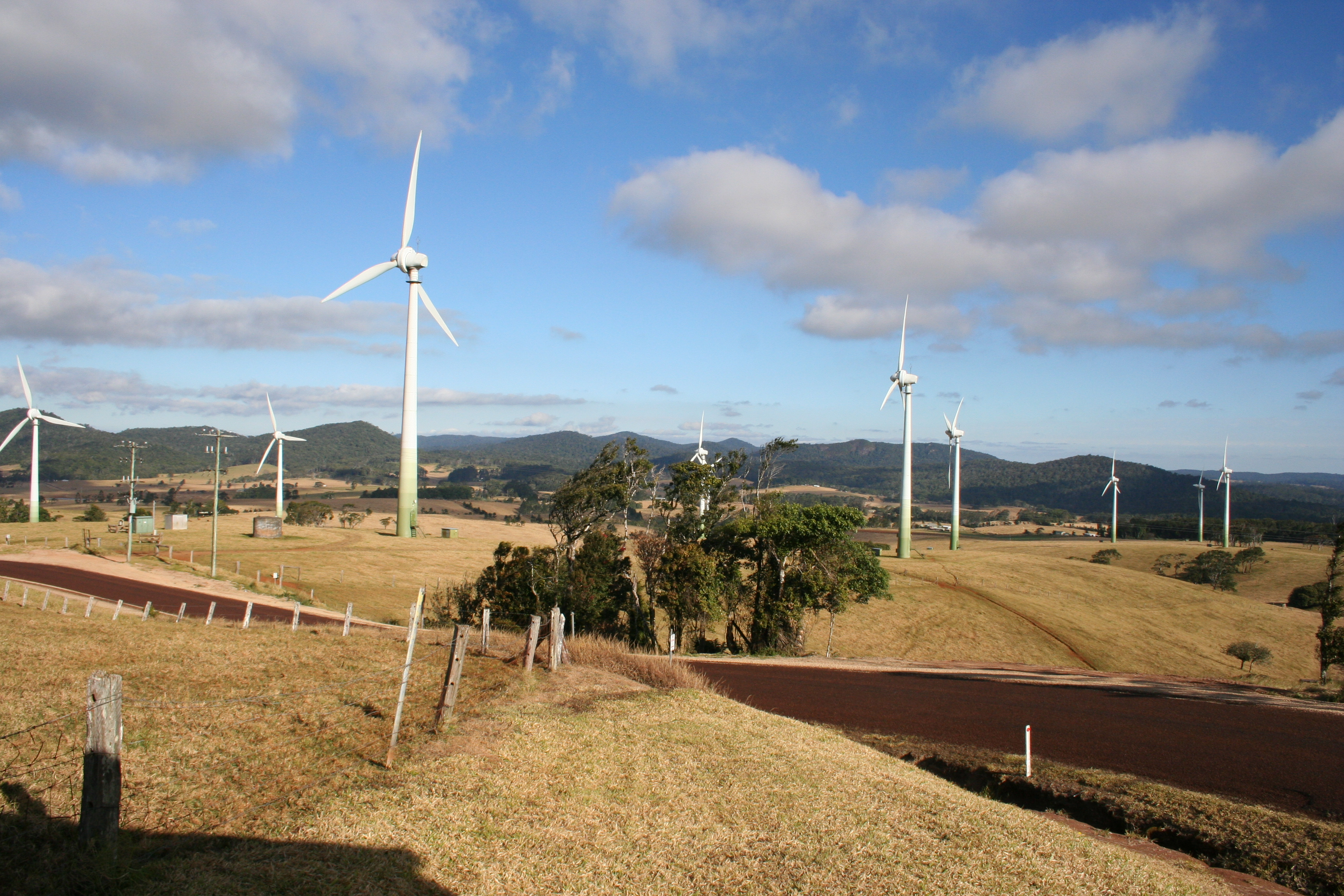
Windy Hill Wind Farm, Atherton Tablelands, Queensland

In 2022, wind power supplied around 35.6% of Australia's renewable electricity and around 12.8% of Australia's total electricity. Eight new wind farms were commissioned in 2022 with a combined capacity of 1,410 MW, bringing the total installed capacity to more than 10.5 GW. As of the end of 2022, 19 wind farms with a combined capacity of 4.7 GW were either under construction or financial committed nationally.

Wind power in Victoria is the most developed with 8,655 GWh (31,160 TJ) generated in 2021, followed by South Australia with 5,408 GWh (19,470 TJ), New South Wales with 5,384 GWh (19,380 TJ), Western Australia with 3,407 GWh (12,270 TJ), Tasmania with 1,859 GWh (6,690 TJ), and Queensland with 1,772 GWh (6,380 TJ).

The largest wind farm in Australia is the Stockyard Hill Wind Farm, which opened in 2022 with a capacity of 530 MW. This overtook the 453 MW Coopers Gap Wind Farm.

Top 5 operational wind farms by capacity (MW)
Rank	Name	Capacity (MW)	Commissioned
1	Stockyard Hill Wind Farm	532	2022
2	Coopers Gap Wind Farm	453	2021
3	Macarthur Wind Farm	420	2012
4	Dundonnell Wind Farm	336	2021
5	Moorabool Wind Farm	321	2022

Australian wind electricity generation by year
Year	2013	2014	2015	2016	2017	2018	2019	2020	2021	2022	2023	2024
Generation (GWh)	9259	9777	11802	12903	12873	16171	19487	22605	26804	29892	31559	32518
% of Renewable Electricity	26.6	30.9	33.7	30.8	33.8	33.5	35.4	35.9	35.9	35.6	33.9	33.5
% of Total Electricity	3.9	4.2	4.9	5.3	5.7	7.1	8.5	9.9	11.7	12.8	13.4	13.4

== Academic literature ==
Australia has a very high potential for renewable energy. Therefore, the transition to a renewable energy system is gaining momentum in the peer-reviewed scientific literature. Among them several studies have examined the feasibility of a transition to a 100% renewable electricity systems, which was found both practicable as well as economically and environmentally beneficial to combat global warming.

== Major renewable energy companies ==
=== BP Solar ===
BP has been involved in solar power since 1973 and its subsidiary, BP Solar, is now one of the world's largest solar power companies with production facilities in the United States, Spain, India and Australia. BP Solar is involved in the commercialisation of a long life deep cycle lead acid battery, jointly developed by the CSIRO and Battery Energy, which is ideally suited to the storage of electricity for renewable remote area power systems (RAPS).

=== Edwards ===
Edwards first began manufacturing water heaters in Australia in 1963. Edwards is now an international organisation which is a leader in producing hot water systems for both domestic and commercial purposes using solar technology. Edwards exports to Asia, the Pacific, the Americas, Europe, Africa and the Middle East.

=== Engie Australia ===
ENGIE is a major contributor to Australia's renewable energy sector, developing a portfolio of wind, solar and battery storage projects across the country, including the 119 MW Willogoleche Wind Farm and 46 MW Canunda Wind Farm. ENGIE is also expanding solar capacity through projects such as the 250 MW Goorambat East Solar Farm in Victoria, scheduled to supply the National Electricity Market from 2027, and strengthening battery infrastructure with full ownership of the 150 MW/150 MWh Hazelwood Battery Energy Storage System, Australia's first grid-scale battery built on a former coal plant site.

=== Hydro Tasmania ===
Hydro Tasmania was set up by the State Government in 1914 (originally named the Hydro-Electric Department, changed to the Hydro-Electric Commission in 1929, and Hydro Tasmania in 1998). Today Hydro Tasmania is Australia's largest generator of renewable energy. They operate thirty hydro-electric stations and one gas power station, and are a joint owner in three wind farms.

=== Meridian Energy Australia ===
Meridian Energy Australia runs a number of renewable energy assets (4 wind farms and 4 hydro plants) and only produces renewable energy – it claims to be Australasia's largest 100% renewable energy generator.

=== Nectr ===
Nectr is an Australian-based electricity retailer that focuses on offering renewable energy plans and services. Launched in 2019, it currently operates in New South Wales, South East Queensland and South Australia, planning to expand to Victoria, Tasmania and the ACT in 2022. Nectr is owned by Hanwha Energy, an affiliate of South Korea's Hanwha Group, one of the global leaders in renewable energy technology, including solar power (Hanwha Q Cells) and battery storage technologies. The company offers 100% carbon offset plans, GreenPower plans and also launched solar and battery installation bundles in Ausgrid and Endeavour within NSW. Its parent company Hanwha Energy Australia is an investor in Australian utility-scale solar power assets, including the 20 MWAC Barcaldine solar farm in Queensland and the 88 MWAC Bannerton solar farm in Victoria. It is currently developing two new solar farms in southern NSW with capacity to produce enough energy to supply 50,000 homes.

=== Origin Energy ===
Origin Energy is active in the renewable energy arena, and has spent a number of years developing several wind farms in South Australia, a solar cell business using technology invented by a team led by Professor Andrew Blakers at the Australian National University, and geothermal power via a minority shareholding stake in Geodynamics.

=== Pacific Blue ===
Pacific Blue is an Australian company that specialises in 100% renewable energy generation. Its focus is on hydroelectricity and wind power. Power stations owned by Pacific Blue include wind farms: Codrington Wind Farm, Challicum Hills Wind Farm, Portland Wind Project and Hydro power: Eildon Pondage Power Station, Ord River Hydro Power Station and The Drop Hydro.

=== Snowy Hydro Limited ===
Snowy Hydro Limited, previously known as the Snowy Mountains Hydro-Electric Authority, manages the Snowy Mountains Scheme which generates on average around 4,500 GWh (16,000 TJ) of renewable energy each year, which represented around 37% of all renewable energy in the National Electricity Market in 2010. The scheme also diverts water for irrigation from the Snowy River Catchment west to the Murray and Murrumbidgee River systems.

=== Solahart ===
Solahart manufactured its first solar water heater in 1953, and products currently manufactured by Solahart include thermosiphon and split system solar and heat pump water heaters. These are marketed in 90 countries around the world and overseas sales represent 40% of total business. Solahart has a market share of 50% in Australia.

=== Solar Systems ===
Solar Systems was a leader in high concentration solar photovoltaic applications, and the company built a photovoltaic Mildura Solar concentrator power station, Australia. This project will use innovative concentrator dish technology to power 45,000 homes, providing 270,000 MWh (970,000 GJ) per year for $420M. Solar Systems has already completed construction of three concentrator dish power stations in the Northern Territory, at Hermannsburg, Yuendumu, and Lajamanu, which together generate 1,555 MWh (5,600 GJ) per year (260 homes, going by the energy/home ratio above). This represents a saving of 420,000 litres (110,000 US gallons) of diesel fuel and 1,550 tonnes (3,420,000 pounds) of greenhouse gas emissions per year. The total cost of the solar power station was "$7M, offset by a grant from the Australian and Northern Territory Governments under their Renewable Remote Power Generation Program". The price of diesel in remote areas is high due to added transportation costs: in 2017, retail diesel prices in remote areas of the Northern Territory averaged $1.90/L ($7.2/US gal). The 420,000 litres (110,000 US gallons) of diesel per year saved by these power stations in the first decade of operation would thus have cost approximately $8M.

=== Wind Prospect ===
Wind Prospect is a company based in Bristol, UK, founded in 1992. An Adelaide-born employee, Michael Vawser, established a separate company of the same name in Adelaide, South Australia, in 2000. The company first created the 46 MW Canunda Wind Farm in the south-east of the state (commissioned in March 2005), followed by the 70 MW Mount Millar Wind Farm on the Eyre Peninsula. It built many wind farms in SA, and then expanded interstate. As of March 2024 the Australian company is based in Melbourne, Victoria, and has obtained planning approval for 22 wind farms and 2 solar farms in total. The Wind Prospect Group, apart from the UK and Australia, also operates in Ireland, Canada, France (as WPO), and China.

== See also ==
- Australian Renewable Energy Hub, WA
- Biofuel in Australia
- Centre for Energy and Environmental Markets
- Climate change in Australia
- Energy in South Australia
- Geothermal power in Australia
- Green electricity in Australia
- Greenhouse gas emissions by Australia
- Photovoltaic engineering in Australia
- Renewable electricity production by country
- Renewable Energy Certificates (US)
- Renewable energy commercialisation
- Renewable energy by country (topics)
- Solar power in Australia
- Wind power in Australia
