= Solar Cities in Australia =

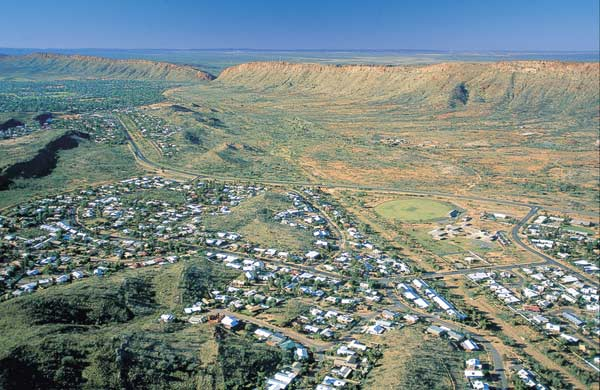
Alice Springs, located around the Simpson Desert, is one of the five nominated regions in Australia to become a solar city.

Solar Cities is an A$97 million demonstration programme designed to promote solar power, smart meters, energy conservation and new approaches to electricity pricing to provide a sustainable energy future in urban locations throughout Australia. Adelaide, Alice Springs, Blacktown, Central Victoria and Townsville were nominated to be the first Solar Cities of Australia, in the 2007 election campaign the Labor government committed to expanding the programme to include Coburg and Perth. Solar Cities is a program that aims to show how technology, behavior change, and new approaches to energy pricing can combine to provide a sustainable energy future in urban locations throughout Australia" (Alice Solar City Energy Champions 2008, p. 2).

== Key goals ==
Key goals of the program are to demonstrate the possibilities for solar power, smart meters, energy conservation, new approaches to electricity pricing and sustainable living in urban locations. It is a partnership approach that involves all levels of Government, the private sector and the local community. Consumers will be able to purchase solar photovoltaic panels using discounted loans. The project also plans to help low-income and rental households in the community share in the benefits of the project through other cost-saving initiatives. The Solar City project aims for customers to better understand energy use, electricity companies to understand the extent of cost savings in servicing peak demand periods, to provide a low risk environment to test new sustainable energy options, and for Governments to develop future energy and green house emission policies. Their vision is to create a model of cooperation between governments, businesses, and the community to achieve a community conscious of its unique environment and natural resources (Alice Solar City, 2008 p. 2). The program emphasizes the importance of being energy efficient as the first priority, followed by utilizing renewable energy sources (Alice Solar City Energy Champions 2008, p. 3).

== Solar City projects ==
=== Adelaide ===
The areas of the City of Salisbury, City of Tea Tree Gully and City of Playford and Adelaide City Council are part of the Adelaide Solar City. Adelaide has peak electricity supply problems, higher average domestic electricity prices than other States and a large amount of sunshine each year.

Energy options being trialled through the Adelaide Solar City include:

1. 1,700 solar photovoltaic panels (2MW) will be installed on homes and commercial buildings doubling South Australia's current photovoltaic capacity.
2. Consumers will receive help to finance their solar systems.
3. Installation of solar panels on up to 5 iconic buildings such as the Adelaide Central Markets, the new Adelaide Bus Depot, Salisbury Watershed, Playford Aquadome and SA Water Building.
4. 7,000 smart meters will be installed in homes and businesses to help people monitor their energy use.
5. 40,000 energy efficiency and information packages will be distributed.
6. An extensive consumer campaign to adopt Green Power.
7. Some community housing tenants to trial solar power and solar hot water.

=== Alice Springs ===
Some proposed features of the project include:

1. Several large notable solar power installations.
2. 400 smart meters in 350 homes and 50 businesses. These will be combined with a time-of-use tariff to encourage customers to reduce their energy use at times of high demand.
3. Residential and commercial photovoltaic systems that will provide solar energy for Alice Springs.
4. A buy-back tariff for energy sold back to the grid to encourage takeup of photovoltaic panels.
5. 1,000 solar hot water systems for households.
6. 850 'walkthrough' energy audits to help the community better manage their energy use. Reductions of up to 20 per cent off their future energy bills are expected.

A AUD1.54 million project to build Australia's largest roof mounted solar power system on the roof of the Alice Crowne Plaza was announced on 1 October 2008.

Alice Solar City has been operating a little over 1.5 years. To date on 17 March 2009, 610 householders and 32 businesses had registered with Alice Solar City; 520 home energy surveys had been completed, and $1.5 million in financial incentives for energy efficient measures had been issued. Over 40 solar PV and 100 solar hot water systems had been installed (Centralian Advocate 2009e, p. 23). The completed solar technology installations are estimated to save 400,000 kWh per year, which equates to the average energy consumption of about 50 Alice Springs homes (Boon 2009, p. 4).

- Projected Environmental Benefits (Alice Solar City Energy Champions 2008)
- Reduction in Energy Demand : 5,352 kW
- Reduction in annual Energy Consumption: 10,667 MWh/year (Electricity) + 5,233 GJ/year (gas)
- Estimated Reduction in CO_{2} emissions: 8,683 tonnes/year (Electricity) + 4,259 tonnes/year (gas)
- Equivalent cars removed per year: 3,266 Equivalent number of all cars in Alice Springs removed per year: 22%

=== Blacktown ===
The lead organisation for this project is BP Solar. This project includes efficiency audit trials, 3,500 energy efficiency consultations installation of solar water heaters and photovoltaic panel installation that supplies one megawatt of solar energy, amongst other measures.

=== Central Victoria ===
The Central Victoria Solar City was announced on 10 December 2008. It covers one fifth of Victoria and involves 14 municipalities. Locals of Ballarat and Bendigo will be able to support solar power without having a photovoltaic system on their roof, as two large solar parks, each generating 300 kW, will be built near those cities.

=== Coburg ===
The Coburg Solar City was announced on 10 June 2008. Low income households are intended to be a focus of the program.

=== Perth ===
Under Stage 1 of the Perth Solar City project it is proposed to:

1. install 6,000 smart meters and 2,514 smart meters with monitors
2. distribute and install 6,300 Perth Solar City energy efficiency packs
3. have 20 schools install a 1 kW photovoltaic system and in-class monitors.
4. install 663 1 kW PV systems and 695 solar hot water systems.

=== Townsville ===
Ergon Energy is the leader of the consortium initiating the 2007 to 2013 project. The project involved free energy audits, installation of smart meters and solar photovoltaic systems installed in selected homes and public buildings.

== See also ==
- Andrew Blakers
- Building-integrated photovoltaics
- Feed-in tariffs in Australia
- Martin Green
- Photovoltaics
- Photovoltaic engineering in Australia
- Renewable energy in Australia
- Wind power in Australia
