= Jackgreen =

Australian electricity retailer

Jackgreen Energy
- Type: electricity company
- Defunct: 18 December 2009
- Headquarters: Woolloomooloo, New South Wales, Australia
- Key people: Greg Martin, John Smith, Peter Vines, Andrew Randall, Andrew Woodward
- Website: www.jackgreen.com.au

Jackgreen Energy was an Australian electricity retailer. Before the company collapsed in late 2009, it was Australia's largest specialist renewable energy retailer, with around 100 employees, and 75,000 customers. In 2007 Jackgreen purchased Easy Being Green, a carbon offset program. Jackgreen was suspended from the National Electricity Market on 18 December 2009 by the independent market operator. Before its collapse, Jackgreen's products incorporated a percentage component of green energy, ranging between 10% and 100%.

== History ==
Jackgreen was incorporated in June 2001. It was granted a New South Wales Retail License in March 2002 and became a National Electricity Market Code Participant in January 2004. In June 2005, it became a member of the Electricity & Water Ombudsman NSW (EWON) scheme.

The key people behind Jackgreen were Andrew Randall, John Smith and Peter Vines. When Smith retired, he handed control to Greg Martin, formerly the CEO of AGl Limited.

Andrew Randall was Jackgreen's only Managing Director and reigned over the company until he was removed by Greg Martin who over the next 6 months saw the placed into receivership by an attack from NSW retailers seeking to regain JGL customers via the courts.

Andrew Joined the Board on 14 December 2004 as Managing Director. Andrew has been involved in the development of the electricity business since early 2004. He has served on many boards; both listed an unlisted and has over 20 years experience in the financial services, information technology and energy industries. His business expertise has been used for many successful corporate advisory engagements, including assignments within the energy industry. He has specific expertise in determining growth strategies for emerging businesses in Australia, and implementing those strategies. In 2000 this practice was merged with Obelisk Capital Pty Ltd.

Peter Vines served as Non Executive Director, age 58 Chairman Audit Committee and Joined the Board on 5 October 2007. Peter has extensive experience as both a non-executive and executive director across the utility sector overseas and within Australia, most recently as the Executive General Manager Retail at Origin Energy. Mr Vines is also a director of Melbourne Water Corporation and the NT Water and Power Corporation.

John Smith Joined the Board on 14 December 2004, an independent director, John is a former CEO of Australian Energy Limited and a former group executive of Powercor Limited, with over 15 years experience in the electricity industry. As an executive of Powercor Limited, he helped shape the customer market share balance of the early Victorian electricity market and, with the opening of the NSW market, established Powercor Limited as the leading national retailer. Seconded in 1996 to the USA parent company, Pacificorp Inc, Mr. Smith delivered retail market contestable strategies in the western United States. He has spoken at many public forums and has delivered papers to US senatorial committees on retail electricity.

In August 2009, the company suffered losses of A$7.08 million.

On 18 December 2009, JackGreen Energy went into voluntary administration due to financial difficulties, part of which was a debt to NSW energy supplier Integral Energy. That day, JackGreen Energy was suspended from trading by the Australian Energy Market.

After the collapse of Jackgreen, some domestic customers were owed money after paying their bills in advance, but not being provided with the electricity. The company was owed in excess of $5M by customers that had not paid their bills. The assets were sold onto Green Box ltd a company with connections and shareholding held by Greg Martin.

Jackgreen was served with a court application at the request of state government-owned Integral Energy Australia in December 2009 due to an alleged failure to pay an outstanding $808,983.

The Energy & Water Ombudsman NSW (EWON) found contributing factors for Jackgreen's failure included:

- inappropriate marketing to low income and disadvantaged customers
- initial problems with their 'smooth pay' billing system
- ongoing billing issues resulting in significant billing delays for some customers
- an ineffective credit management policy which allowed high arrears to accumulate
- no viable customer hardship policy to identify and assist those customers in difficulty.

Relationship to Elementus Energy

John Smith is the current Chairman & Non-Executive Director of Elementus Energy. The General Manager for Elementus Energy is Ashleigh J. Antflick, the previous General Manager of Strategic Operations for Jackgreen. Elementus Energy is "Australian renewable energy company" with solar projects in Lorca Spain, Totana Spain and Uriarra Village Australia.

== See also ==
- Uriarra Village
- Green electricity in Australia
- Green energy
- Renewable energy commercialisation in Australia
