= The Big Dish =

The Big Dish may refer to:

- The Big Dish (band), a Scottish pop/rock band
- The Big Dish (game show), a children's game show
- The Big Dish (solar thermal), a Parabolic Concentrator for Solar Thermal Power

== See also ==
- Big ugly dish, a TVRO satellite dish
