= Armada Solar =

Armada Solar was an Australian energy efficiency company based in Canberra. The company was created to capitalize on the ACT Government on the feed in tariff scheme.

== History ==
Armada Solar was founded in 2007. Director Justin Ryan advised the ACT Government on the feed in tariff scheme. In 2009 it partnered with Sunpower to install the first 30 kW solar electricity installation in Canberra at Bunnings in Belconnen. The company installed more than 1000 rooftop solar arrays between 2007 and 2015. During this time Ryan was frequently quoted and interviewed in the media about solar energy and the tariff system.

After the Australian government closed down its feed-in tariff in 2011, Armada Solar began to struggle financially. In spite of this, the company partnered with Australia's National Information and Communications Technology Research Centre of Excellence in 2013 to develop methods of forecasting output from solar arrays.

== Liquidation ==
In February 2015, Armada Solar went into liquidation, with a deficiency of about $1.8 million. Until that time it was the oldest solar power installation company in Canberra.

Other solar panel installation companies hired many of Armada Solar's installers as the ActewAGL solar buyback scheme ended, creating another boom and bust. Director Justin Ryan wrote an article for the Canberra Times about the effects of the ups and downs of the solar industry.
