= Green electricity in Australia =

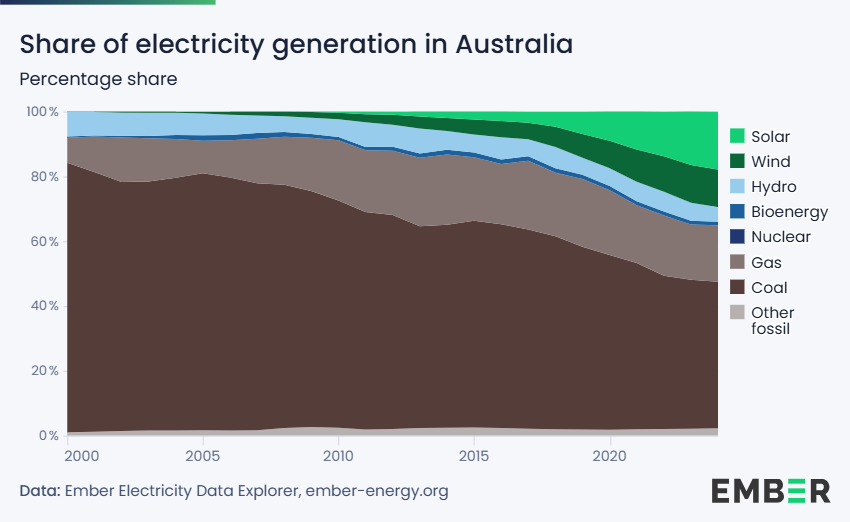
Share of electricity generation in Australia - percentage share

Green electricity in Australia is available from a number of utilities that supply electricity from environmentally friendly energy sources that are renewable and non-polluting. In Australia green energy is accredited under the GreenPower scheme whereby all distributors are government audited bi-annually to ensure that customers are getting exactly what is described in their purchased products. The growth and development of the green energy industry was tracked in Australia by the ALTEX-Australia alternative energy index from 2006 to 2011.

== Market share ==
In the 2009 settlement period there were 904,716 GreenPower customers Australia-wide, accounting for a total of 2,194,934 MWh of electricity generation, a 10% increase over 2008. This total electricity provision was divided between residential customers who purchased 1,001,195 MWh, and business customers who purchased 1,193,739 MWh. By the 2014 settlement period the number of GreenPower customers Australia-wide was at 497,406, and total purchases accounted for 1,279,281 MWh.

== Companies offering GreenPower ==
The largest nationwide distributors were EnergyAustralia, Origin Energy, and TRUenergy. As of 2008 these companies offered a residential GreenPower accredited program:

- AGL
- Click Energy
- Essential Energy
- Domayne
- EnergyAustralia
- Integral Energy
- Jackgreen
- Lumo Energy
- Momentum Energy
- Origin Energy
- Powershop
- Queensland Electricity
- Simply Energy
- South Australia Electricity
- Synergy (electricity corporation)
- TRUenergy
- Victoria Electricity

== See also ==
- Renewable energy commercialisation in Australia
