= Solar Systems (company) =

Australian energy company

Solar Systems was an Australian company that constructed three concentrated solar power stations in remote Indigenous communities the Northern Territory, Australia, using 30 solar concentrator dishes which together generated 720 kilowatts (970 hp) and 1,555,000 kilowatt-hours (5,600,000 MJ) per year. The sites were in Hermannsburg, Yuendumu and Lajamanu. This represented a saving of 420,000 litres of diesel fuel and 1550 tonnes of greenhouse gas emissions.

In 2003, Solar Systems completed construction of the first concentrator dish power station at Umuwa in South Australia. Solar Systems is a winner in the 2005 Engineering Excellence Awards.

The Mildura Solar Concentrator Power Station project to build a 154 megawatts (207,000 hp) solar plant was announced in 2006 and expected to be completed in 2013.

However, Solar Systems was placed under voluntary administration on 7 September 2009 placing the Mildura Solar Power Station project and the jobs of two-thirds of the workforce at risk.

In 2011, Silex Systems purchased Solar Systems for $2 million. The power stations that were then in service were purchased by the electrical utilities that had agreed to buy the power from them. Silex completed a 1.5 MW demonstration plant in April 2013; however, the project was abandoned in August 2014 due to a number of factors, including low wholesale electricity prices, a lack of commitment to clean energy by the Australian government and uncertainty surrounding the Renewable Energy Target (RET) in Australia. Silex shut down Solar Systems' "dense array" solar power business in September 2015.

== See also ==
- Solar power in Australia
