= Kiamal Solar Farm =

Solar farm near Ouyen, Victoria, Australia

Kiamal solar farm
- Country: Australia
- Location: Ouyen
- Coordinates: 35°01′S 142°18′E
- Status: Under construction
- Construction began: October 2018
- Owner: TotalEnergies

Solar farm
- Type: Standard PV
- Solar tracker: Single-axis

Power generation
- Nameplate capacity: 200 MW

External links
- Website: kiamalsolarfarm.com.au

Kiamal Solar Farm is a photovoltaic power station under construction north of Ouyen in western Victoria, Australia. Stage 1 is expected to be completed by the end of 2019. It is owned by Total Eren, a renewable energy subsidiary of TotalEnergies When completed, stage 1 at 256MW will be Victoria's largest solar farm. Construction began in October 2018. It has energy offtake agreements with Mars Australia, Flow Power and Alinta Energy.

It was claimed in April 2019 that 13 water corporations in Victoria had entered into a contract to purchase power from the farm.

Kiamal will be one of the first solar farms to install a synchronous condenser as part of the requirements to connect to the electricity grid. The synchronous condenser was manufactured by Siemens and delivered on the MV Salome to Port Adelaide then transferred by road to the site near Ouyen.
