= Mildura Solar Concentrator Power Station =

Proposed solar system

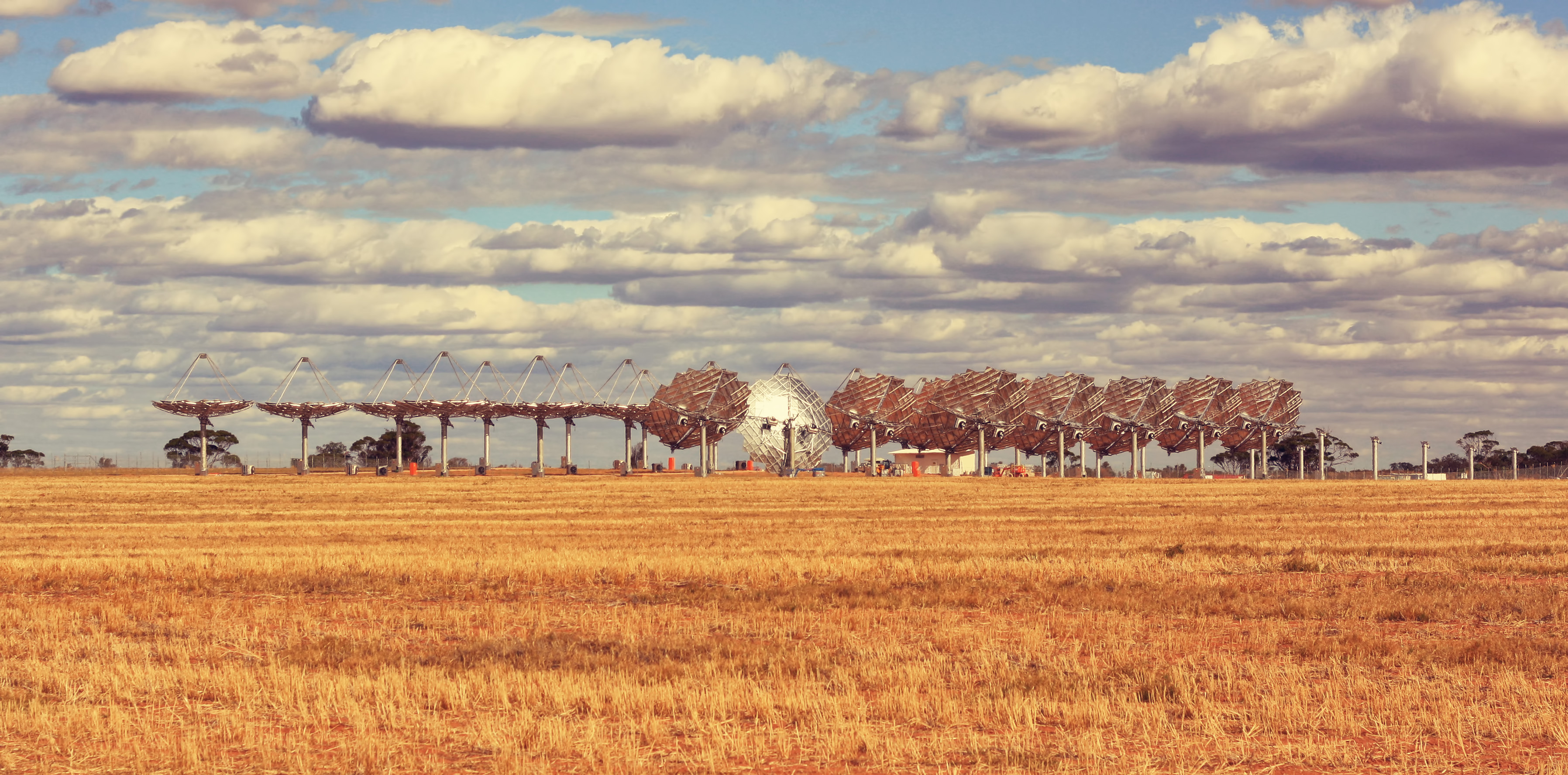
- The 1.5 MW demonstration facility completed in 2013
- Country: Australia
- Location: Mildura, Victoria
- Coordinates: 34°27′58″S 142°11′00″E
- Construction began: 2012

Solar farm
- Type: CPV

Power generation
- Nameplate capacity: 1.5 MW; Planned: 100 MW

External links
- Website: solarsystems.com.au

The Mildura Solar Concentrator Power Station was a proposed 100-megawatt concentrated photovoltaic (CPV) solar PV system to be built at Carwarp, near Mildura, Victoria, Australia. It was proposed by Solar Systems in 2006, which was acquired by Silex Systems in 2010. A 1.5 MW demonstration plant was completed in April 2013. Construction of the larger facility was expected to commence in 2014 and be completed in 2017. However, the expansion plan was abandoned in August 2014 due to a number of factors, including low wholesale electricity prices, a lack of commitment to clean energy by the Australian government and uncertainty surrounding the Renewable Energy Target (RET) in Australia. Another concentrator photovoltaics plant opened in 2023, at 4 MW power and 2.8 MW / 50 MWh storage using the thermal organic Rankine cycle. A conventional 171 MW photovoltaics plant is scheduled for 2026, with 120 MW battery to follow connecting to a 220 kV line.

== History ==
The project to build a 154-megawatt solar plant was announced in 2006 and expected to be completed in 2013. It was delayed after Solar Systems went into administration as a result of the 2008 financial crisis. The demonstration plant was completed in 2013, however, the plan was abandoned in 2014.

== Technology ==
The "CS500" dish concentrator PV unit design has 112 curved reflecting mirrors, which track the sun throughout the day. The combination of mirror profile, mounting framework, and solar receiver will deliver concentrated solar energy to each PV module. The tracking mechanism allows electricity to be produced during the day whenever the sun is more than 5° above the horizon. Direct current electricity from the receivers is passed through a solar inverter that produces grid-quality alternating current. Transformers step up the voltage to the requirement of the local network at the point of connection. Advantages claimed for this design include:

- "The CS500 dish has a longer effective operating life than conventional photovoltaic arrays. Because the receiver is only a small area of PV (a 35 kW CS500 dish has a PV area of 0.23m² whereas 35 kW of traditional flat plate would use approximately 350m^{2}) maintenance is simple, quick and affordable. The modules include a specially designed filter that removes harmful UV radiation that reduces the operating efficiency and life of traditional PV technology. The modules are also cooled, which increases their effective operating life and their efficiency".
- "The CS500 dish costs significantly less (per installed watt) than traditional PV technology. This is despite the fact that the CS500 is new and still near the top of its cost curve. Advances in technology, maturity and volume production will further increase the gap".
- "The CS500 produces more electricity (per installed watt) than fixed flatplate PV technology - by up to 30%. This is because it tracks the sun and operates at lower temperatures".

== Previous projects ==
The commercialisation of this technology has already seen four smaller solar power stations established in central Australia, with support from the Australian Greenhouse Office.

== See also ==
- Solar power in Australia
- Energy policy of Australia
