= The Big Dish (solar thermal) =

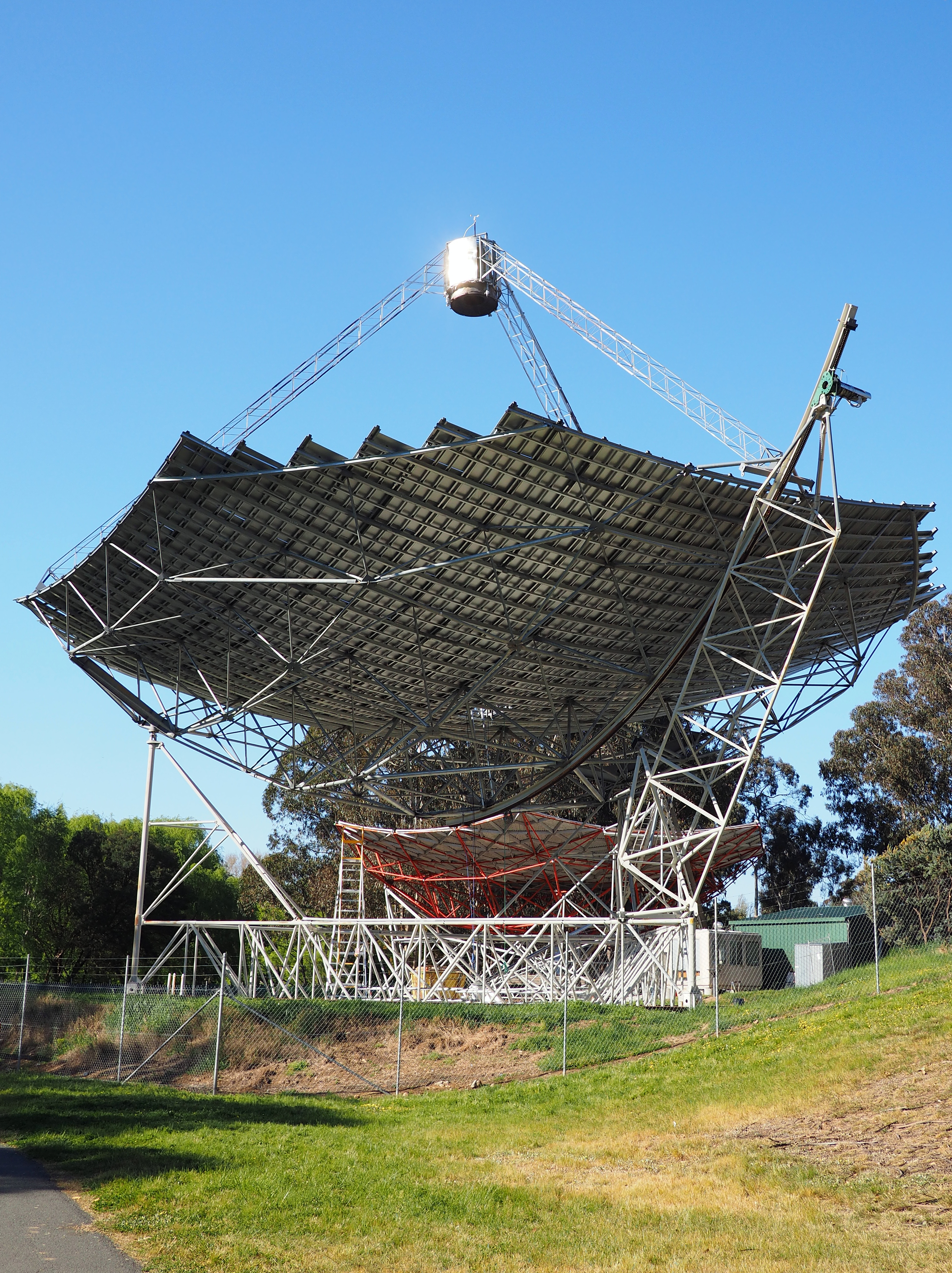
The SG4 dish in 2014

The Big Dish is a parabolic dish concentrator developed by the Australian National University's Solar Thermal Group. The initial prototype, SG3 , was constructed on the Canberra campus of the Australian National University in 1994. A modified version of SG3 was exported to Ben-Gurion National Solar Energy Center at the Ben Gurion University in Israel. In 2006, a joint project led by the Solar Thermal Group with commercial partner Wizard Power, and funding from Australian's Government's Renewable Energy Development Initiative, began the design and construction of SG4 . SG4 is located next to the SG3 dish, and was completed in 2009.

Wizard Power held the patent rights for the SG4 Big Dish structure and was planning on developing commercial installations of hundreds of dishes delivering tens to hundreds of megawatts of power. In 2013, the first of these projects, the Whyalla Solar Oasis, which would use 300 Big Dishes to deliver a 40MWe solar thermal power, was canceled after the consortium failed to meet deadlines. In June 2013, Wizard Power entered voluntary administration, and ceased operations later that year.

== Later development ==
After Wizard Power ceased operations in 2013, the SG4 Big Dish remained in use for research at the Australian National University. Subsequent work focused on improving high-temperature receivers designed for use with the 500-square-metre dish concentrator. Research supported by the Australian Renewable Energy Agency included testing a thermal receiver capable of producing superheated steam, with experiments conducted around 2015.

The SG4 system has continued to serve as a research platform for solar-thermal technology, providing experimental data used to study energy-conversion performance and potential future applications of dish-based solar concentrators.

Industry reporting in 2023 also described the installation of an SG4-type Big Dish system in Gujarat, India, at the Kailash Cancer Hospital and Research Centre, where it was used to generate steam for institutional operations.

== See also ==
- Australian National University
- Solar thermal collector
- Concentrating solar power (CSP)
- Solar tracker
- SolarPACES
- Wizard Power
