= Wizard Power =

Solar technology

Wizard Power Pty Ltd
- Company type: Private Limited Company
- Industry: Solar technology research, development, and commercialization
- Defunct: September 2013
- Headquarters: Canberra, Australia
- Products: Big Dish, Solar concentrator technology

Wizard Power Pty Ltd was an Australian company headquartered in Canberra, focused on solar technology research, development, and commercialization. One of their notable contributions was the creation of the Big Dish, the world's largest paraboloidal dish solar concentrator.

== Technology ==
In conjunction with the Australian National University, Wizard Power developed a suite of advanced solar mirror panel technology specifically designed for Big Dish and other solar concentrators. These mirror panels, along with their unique thermal and thermochemical solar energy storage systems, played a crucial role in delivering large-scale, zero-emission thermal and electrical energy for various dispatchable power applications.

Wizard Power positioned themselves as providers of research, development, technology support, and systems integration services necessary to facilitate the implementation of projects utilizing their solar technologies.

Moreover, the company had ongoing initiatives in developing high-temperature solar gasification solutions. These solutions aimed to convert coal, biomass, and other carbonaceous materials into valuable resources such as liquid fuels, plastics, and fertilizers.

One of Wizard Power's endeavors was the establishment of a demonstration site in Whyalla, South Australia. The proposed Whyalla Solar Storage plant was intended to showcase their energy storage technologies. This pre-commercial demonstration project received support from the Commonwealth Government of Australia's Advance Electricity Storage Program. The Whyalla SolarOasis, a 40MWe solar thermal power plant utilizing 300 Big Dish solar thermal concentrators, was planned to be built near the solar storage research facility. This peaking power plant would have operated during the day and early evening to meet the demand for electricity during peak periods.

Unfortunately, despite these promising initiatives, Wizard Power Pty Ltd ceased its operations in September 2013. As a result, the company incurred a debt of 8 million dollars owed to creditors and employees.

== 230 million dollar project failure ==
A $230 million project was to use Wizard Power Technology to generate 66GWh of solar electricity each year. For a variety of commonwealth and corporate mismanagement reasons, the project did not proceed past the proposal stage.

== Renewable Energy Demonstration Program ==
The Whyalla SolarOasis has been supported by the Australian Government's Renewable Energy Demonstration Program with a A$60 million grant and will be developed by the SolarOasis consortium.

The Commonwealth funding was canceled in June 2013.
