= Feed-in tariffs in Australia =

Electricity generation from renewable sources in Australia, 2010

Feed-in tariffs in Australia are the feed-in tariffs (FITs) paid under various State schemes to non-commercial producers of electricity generated by solar photovoltaic (PV) systems using solar panels. They are a way of subsidising and encouraging uptake of renewable energy and in Australia have been enacted at the State level, in conjunction with a federal mandatory renewable energy target.

Australian FIT schemes tend to focus on providing support to solar PV particularly in the residential context, and project limits on installed capacity (such as 10 kW in NSW) mean effectively that FITs do not support large scale projects such as wind farms or solar thermal power stations.

== Gross vs. net FIT schemes ==
Some schemes are based on a gross feed-in tariff model while most are based on a net tariff.

Net feed-in tariff schemes have been criticised for not providing enough incentive for households to install solar panels and thus for not effectively encouraging the uptake of solar PV. They have been described as a "fake feed-in tariff". Critics of net FIT argue that gross tariffs conform to the normal definition of a feed-in tariff, and provide a more certain financial return, paying for all electricity produced, even if it is consumed by the producer, reducing or helping meet peak demand. The issue still remains as to what level the FIT rate should be set – e.g., at the cost of production, at market rates, at the cost at which the retailer sells electricity, or at the rate at which the retailer can acquire electricity in the wholesale market, while others set them at premium or subsidy levels.

The effective difference is that household producers under a gross scheme pay for electricity from the electricity retailer for household consumption at the market rate while all the power produced by them is sold to the retailer at the higher subsided FIT rate. Net FIT schemes effectively use the same rate for the use of electricity by household producers as for sale into the grid (i.e., use of electricity by the household reduces the amount of electricity available to feed into the grid), and accordingly the subsidy to household producers is generally less in overall terms.

The ACT and New South Wales had gross feed-in tariffs, which were subsequently replaced with net feed-in tariffs.

== Proposed federal gross feed-in tariff scheme ==
A uniform federal scheme to supersede all State schemes has been proposed by Tasmanian Greens Senator Christine Milne, but not enacted. National feed-in tariff systems have been enacted in numerous countries including Brazil, Canada, China and many EU countries.

The Federal Parliament has not yet enacted a national gross feed-in tariff scheme for renewable energy. However, a capital grant/rebate was offered of up to $8,000 per household for domestic installations and 50% for school installations up until June 2009.

In July 2008, a bill was introduced by Australian Greens Senator Christine Milne, (Tasmania), called the Renewable Energy (Electricity) Amendment (Feed-In Tariff) Bill 2008. The bill was the subject of an inquiry by the Senate Standing Committee on Environment, Communications and the Arts.

More than 23,000 people have signed an online petition for a national gross feed-in tariff.

In a speech, the Federal Minister for Energy, Martin Ferguson, said that feed-in tariffs are technologically prescriptive and ideologically based, rather than being a market based mechanism. In response to the German feed-in tariff for solar, he suggested that Germany's solar subsidy meant German consumers paid more than €1 billion in additional power bills in 2007 to generate around 0.5% of Germany's gross electricity consumption, suggesting that the policy does not deliver value for money. He also suggested that an Australian solar feed-in tariff may lead to greater PV panel imports rather than a significant expansion of Australian production. However commentators have suggested that Martin Ferguson's comments are ideologically driven and do not take into account the Merit Order Effect which in some instance negates or almost negates the cost of funding FiTs and in other instances shows funding FiTs delivers a net dividend to consumers.

== State government feed-in tariff schemes ==
State	Current status	Max Size	Rate Paid	Program Duration	Model
VIC - Premium	Nov 2009 to Sep 2011 - Closed on 29 December 2011	5 kW	60c/kWh	15 years	Net
VIC - Transitional	Closed on 31 Dec 2012	5 kW	25c/kWh	until 31 Dec 2016	Net
VIC - Standard	Closed on 31 Dec 2012	< 100 kW	1 to 1 (@ retail tariff rate)	until 31 Dec 2016	Net
VIC - closed	1 January 2013 – 31 Dec 2015	< 100 kW	6.2c/kWh	until 31 Dec 2015	Net
VIC - Closed	1 January 2016 – 30 Jun 2017	< 100 kW	5c/kWh	N/A	Net
VIC - Current	Commenced 1 July 2017	< 100 kW	3.3c/kWh	N/A	Net
SA - grp 1	Approved before 31 August 2010; Installed before 29 January 2012 - Closed	10 kW	44c+/kWh	until 30 June 2028	Net
SA - grp 2	Approved between 1 September 2010 and 30 September 2011; Installed before 30 September 2011 - Closed	10 kW (max 45kWh/day)	44c+/kWh	until 30 June 2028	Net
SA - grp 3	Approved between 1 September 2010 and 30 September 2011; Installed before 1 October 2011 (+ 120 days) - Closed	10 kW (max 45kWh/day)	44c+/kWh	until 30 June 2028	Net
SA - grp 4	Approved between 1 October 2011 and 30 September 2013; To be installed before 1 October 2013 (+ 120 days)	10 kW (max 45kWh/day)	16c/kWh + Minimum Retailer Payment (MRP) (MRP: 1 July 2012 to 30 June 2013: 9.8c/kWh) (MRP: 1 July 2013 to 30 June 2014: 11.2c/kWh)	until 30 September 2016	Net
SA - grp 5	Approved after 30 September 2013	N/A	0c (eligible to receive a minimum retailer payment)	N/A	Net
ACT	Approved between March 2009 - 30 June 2013	30 kW	50.05c/kWh up to 10 kW capacity (until 30 June 2010); 40.04c/kWh 10 kW to 30 kW capacity (until 30 June 2010); 45.7c/kWh up to 30 kW (from 1 July 2010)	20 years	Gross
ACT	Commenced July 2013	10 kW	7.5c/kWh up to 10 kW capacity	20 years	Net
TAS	Commenced	under 10 kW over 10 kW tbc	1 to 1(@ retail tariff rate from Aurora Energy = 27.785c/kWh)	tbc	Gross
NT	Closed; Incentive is available for 225 rooftop PV systems in Alice Springs.	tbc	45.76 c/kWh. Capped at $5 per day, then reverts to 23.11c per kWh.	tbc	Net
NT	Closed; Valid from 1 July to 31 December 2012	4.5 kW	21.77 c/kWh (Domestic customers <10kVA)	tbc	Net
NT	Valid from 1 January to 30 June 2013	4.5 kW	27.87 c/kWh (Domestic customers <10kVA) Capped at $5 per day, then reverts to 23.11c per kWh.	tbc	Net
WA; Synergy Supply	Closed on 1 August 2011	5 kW	47c/kWh (from 1 August 2010); 40cents (between 1 July – 9 Dec 2011); 20cents (from 10 Dec 2011); Buyback excess electricity rate 8.4094c (also after 1 August 2011)	47c/kWh@10 years	Net
WA; Horizon Power Supply	Closed on 1 August 2011	30 kW	58.93c/kWh (from 1 August 2010) Buyback excess electricity rate range from 10 - 50c/kWh (also after 1 August 2011)	58.93c/kWh@10 years	Net
QLD	Commenced in July 2008, changed on 25 June 2012, closed 1 July 2014.	From 2008: 30 kW; 7 June '11: 5 kW	44 c/kWh: Applications received by 9 July 2012 and installed by 30 June 2013; 8 c/kWh: Applications after 9 July 2012, expired 30 June 2014	44 c/kWh: Until 1 July 2028; 8 c/kWh: Until 30 June 2014	Net
NSW	Closed	10 kW	20c from 28 October 2010 (Prev 60c (From 1 July 2010. 66c))	7 years for 60c tariff	Gross

=== Australian Capital Territory ===
Residential suburban rooftops with photovoltaic solar panels in Canberra

Under the Electricity Feed-in (Renewable Energy Premium) Act 2008, Canberrans can install photovoltaic (solar) cells or other renewable sources, produce their own energy, and sell it back to the power grid but perhaps not until July 2009. They'll be paid a tariff 3.88 times the retail cost of electricity (60c/kWh Jan 2009) for the energy they feed back into the electrical grid for up to 20 years from the date they sign up to the scheme. It is a gross metered scheme meaning that owners get paid a premium rate for all electricity produced by their installation with their own usage being metered separately. The ACT scheme will be the most generous feed in scheme in Australia when it comes into operation some time after March 2009.

As the Australian Capital Territory ("ACT") scheme is a gross feed in scheme, it is a relatively easy task to estimate the payback time for various system sizes because the calculation is independent of electricity consumption. e.g. a well positioned location in the ACT could produce approximately 1800 kWh per year from a 1 kW system or A$1,080 per year at a price of 60 c/kWh. On this basis payback for a 1 kW system costing $5,000 net (includes $8,000 federal rebate & 22 RECS) would be around 5 years. Larger systems would take longer but would have a larger income stream over the life of the system.

The ACT Government established an inter-departmental committee to look at feed in tariffs in November 2007. There is some concern that a proposed commercial solar power plant, the feasibility of which is to be examined by a joint study be ACT government and ActewAGL, may undermine the proposed feed in tariff proposal.

The submission of the Independent Competition and Regulatory Commission 25 February 2008 was that there were issues to be resolved including:

- overall effectiveness and efficiency
- cross-subsidy elements
- equity issues particularly for households suffering financial hardship
- a gross or net approach is adopted
- a clearly predefined finite life (no more than 5 years);
- a partial subsidy rather than full cost recovery
- ability to terminate if national policies are introduced e.g. carbon tax
- transparency of tariff setting

On the grounds that a capacity cap of 30MW had been reached, the FIT scheme in the ACT was closed to micro and medium scale generators at midnight on 13 July 2011 just days after the legislation was amended (by the Greens and Liberal parties voting together against the will of the government Labor party) on 12 July 2011 to enable micro-generators to continue to access it. The micro-generator category under the Act had earlier been closed on 31 May 2011 once a statutory cap of 15 MW had been reached.

=== South Australia ===
In September 2006, it was announced that the Electricity (Feed-In Scheme-Solar Systems) Amendment Bill 2008 would come into force on 1 July 2008 and run out on 30 June 2028. The normal tariff for electricity is $0.26 / kWh and the feed-in tariff was set at $0.44 / kWh. The result is that not only will thousands of South Australian homes have solar systems installed, but many businesses will now have the opportunity to embrace this technology and turn their roofs into mini-renewable power stations. The former South Australian Premier, Mike Rann, wanted the government to be carbon neutral by the year 2020.

The original intent of some parties, for the feed-in tariff to increase with increases to the price of electricity, at a multiple of two was negotiated out before legislated. The 44-cent tariff is only paid for any electricity exported, so only when the system output exceeds domestic demand.

The solar feed-in scheme commenced on 1 July 2008. It was reviewed in 2009-10 and amendments to the legislation took effect from 29 July 2011. The major change to the scheme was to introduce the concept of customer groups, dependent on the dates of approval and connection of the solar PV system, and the reduction of the feed-in tariff for customers receiving approval after 30 September 2011.

Groups 1, 2 and 3 (broadly existing customers) will continue to receive 44 cents and in addition will receive a minimum retailer payment (estimated to start at about 6 cents) to give a total feed-in payment of about 50 cents. Group 4 (approved permission to connect received between 1 October 2011 and 30 September 2013) will receive 16 cents plus the minimum retailer payment to give a total feed-in payment of about 22 cents. Group 5 (approved permission to connect received after 30 September 2013) will not receive any feed-in tariff, but will be eligible for the minimum retailer payment, that is a total payment of about 6 cents. Retailers are free to pay customers more than the legislated minimum rates.

The feed-in tariffs are fixed until 30 June 2028 for Groups 1, 2 and 3 (i.e. the 44-cent rate), and until 30 September 2016 for Group 4 (i.e. the 16-cent rate). The minimum retailer payment will be determined by the Essential Services Commission of South Australia (ESCOSA) has been estimated to commence at about 6 cents from 1 January 2013, and will be reviewed and is expected to increase with the price of electricity over time.

Rebates: The South Australian government does not offer any additional rebates or incentives to domestic customers, it's a solar schools program. Estimated payback: It's very hard to calculate, but it will be best for systems of largest eligible size, where the domestic demand is smallest, or mainly occurs at night and low power consumption during the day. Houses without air-conditioning would seem to fit the bill.

=== New South Wales ===
On 8 May 2008, the NSW government announced that it intended to introduce feed in tariffs. Further details of the solar feed in tariff in NSW were announced on 23 November 2008.

NSW Feed-in Tariff Taskforce was established to advise the NSW Government on the details of a feed-in tariff scheme for NSW. Its representatives are from the Department of Water and Energy, the Department of Environment and Climate Change, the Department of Premier and Cabinet and NSW Treasury. In January 2009, the Taskforce issued a submission on the design of a feed-in tariff scheme for NSW.

On 23 June 2009, the government announced a Solar Bonus Scheme. This is a net feed-in tariff for the state rather than a gross tariff. Under this 20-year scheme, some residents, schools, small businesses and community groups will be paid $0.60 per kwh for the net amount of electricity sold back into the grid. As few as 42,000 households are expected to take advantage of the scheme. The scheme was set to begin on 1 January 2010 and to be reviewed in 2012. The Solar Bonus Scheme is payable to energy customers with solar panel systems up to 10 kW in size;.

On 10 November 2009 it was reported that NSW will switch to a gross feed in tariff. This is expected to increase the average amount received by a household with solar panels by $1500 pa, a 60% increase, highlighting the difference in effect of gross compared to net feed in tariffs. This is expected to reduce the payback period for installation costs to about 8 years. The gross tariff will cost all households about $2 pa.

In October 2010 the New South Wales government cut the solar feed in tariff to $0.20 per kWh, the lowest level in Australia.

In April 2011 the NSW FIT (Solar Bonus) scheme was retrospectively closed to new applicants and removed for current users after a Ministerial declaration was made under s.15A(8C) Electricity Supply Act 1995 (NSW) that the cumulative total installed capacity cap of 300 MW had been reached.

A new feed-in tariff is proposed, with the constraint that it not raise the cost of electricity and not involve funding from the NSW government. This inherently limits the FIT to less than the consumer electricity cost, and does not conform to the normal definition of a feed-in tariff. A feed-in tariff of from 5.2 to 10.3 cents/kWh is proposed. By the normal definition of a feed-in tariff, the cost of a new and expensive generation source, e.g. solar panels, is borne by all of the consumers rather than the early adopters, who instead are rewarded. It is implemented in the expectation that volume will reduce the cost, thus allowing more people to use that source. Feed-in tariff advocacy organizations claim that feed-in tariff is both the least expensive, and the most effective incentive.

=== Western Australia ===
The Western Australian Government had committed to a limited Gross feed in tariff for household scale PV. The scheme was to be funded for four years at a cost of $13.5m and based on a payment of 60c per kWh to recover the capital cost of the system after any rebates. After the capital cost is paid back the tariff would revert to a lower rate or the existing Renewable Energy Buyback Scheme (REBS).

On 2 June 2009 the state government backflipped on this promise and has deferred the introduction of the scheme for 1 year until 1 July 2010. In the new scheme a net metering system would be applied rather than gross. The $13.5m of funds had already been allocated to systems installed prior to 1 July 2009 implementation date in a public display of support for the concept. The over-subscription highlighted the imbalance between public and state support for the renewable energy industry.

On 1 August 2010, the net feed in tariff commenced and existing customers can migrate to the new billing system. New customers would need to sign up the Renewable Energy Buyback Scheme from their state electricity provider, Synergy.

The Feed in Tariff offered by the state government was 40 cents whilst Synergy offers 7 cents via the Renewable Energy Buyback Scheme. Once the customer signed up, they will receive both incentives for 10 years.

On 1 August 2011, the state government suspended all new applications for the Feed in Tariff, citing the expense of the programme as the reason.

From 6 November 2020, a time of export DEBS Buyback Rate applied for eligible DEBS Synergy customers. The new rates are: Electricity exported at peak times between 3pm and 9pm will earn 10 c/kWh; Electricity exported at all other times will earn 3c/kWh. The change was made to move the FIT closer to the wholesale electricity cost rather than the total electricity supply cost. Existing customers on REBS will be grandfathered.

The following changes have since occurred for Synergy customers:

- 1 November 2021: off-peak exports reduced to 2.75c/kWh
- 1 July 2022: off-peak exports reduced to 2.5c/kWh
- 1 July 2023: off-peak exports reduced to 2.25c/kWh
- 1 July 2024: off-peak exports reduced to 2c/kWh

For Horizon Power customers this tariff varies based on the cost of generating electricity in the customer's location. Towns are split into low, medium and high cost locations.

=== Queensland ===
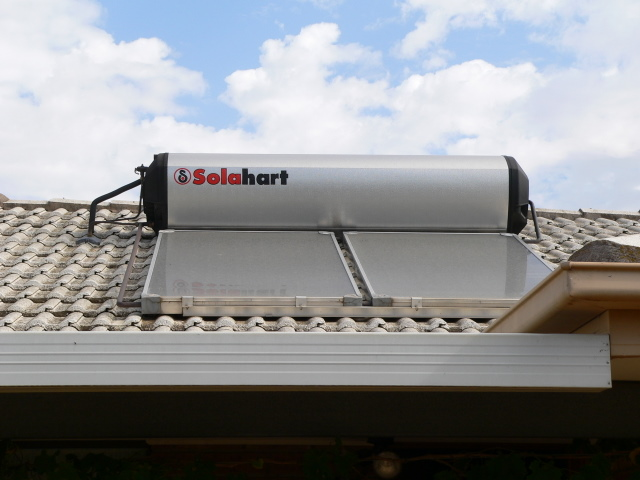
A solar hot water panel and integrated tank on a house roof, 2006

The Queensland Government Solar Bonus Scheme was a program that paid domestic and other small energy customers for the surplus electricity generated from roof-top solar photovoltaic (PV) systems exported to the Queensland grid. It commenced on 1 July 2008. The scheme provided for 44c/kWh (around twice times the general domestic use tariff of 21.35c/kWh (including GST)) on the net amount exported to the grid, subject to having proper metering installed.

The feed-in tariff ensured that Queenslanders benefitted from the federal Photovoltaic Rebate Program.

Whilst the government scheme has now ended for new installs, energy retailers still offer competitive feed in tariffs. As of 1 July 2017, Click Energy provides 16c/kWh and Origin provides 14c/kWh.

=== Victoria ===
In November 2009 Victoria set up a net metered feed-in tariff scheme, under which households were paid 60 cents for every excess kilowatt hour of energy fed back into the state electricity grid. This was about twice the then current retail price for electricity. The feed-in tariff scheme was to run for 15 years from November 2009, and applied to all household systems of up to 5 kW capacity and had a cap of 100MW of generating capacity and/or a $10 per annum increase in the average household electricity bill.

A feed-in tariff scheme was originally announced on 7 May 2008 which had been described by environment groups as ineffective, as the then proposed 2 kW cap on array size, combined with net metering, meant that very little surplus power would be put into the grid so very little of the high tariff would actually be paid. Environment groups and renewable energy companies called for the Victorian feed-in tariff to be paid on gross metering with a 10 kW cap on array size to overcome these problems, but these concerns were only partially addressed in the 2009 scheme.

On 1 September 2011, it was announced that the 60-cent tariff would be closed to new installations after 30 September 2011 after 88,000 installations, and a new Transitional tariff of at least 25 cents would apply to systems installed afterwards. The Transitional tariff will be paid until the end of 2016, when tariffs will be reviewed. The minimum feed-in tariff that applies to new applicants from 1 January 2016 was 5 cents per kilowatt hour (c/kWh). The minimum feed-in tariff that applies to new applicants from 1 July 2017 is 11.3 cents per kilowatt hour (c/kWh). This is broken down as follows. Feed-in tariff component. Forecast solar-weighted average wholesale electricity pool cost - 8.1 (c/kWh). Value of avoided distribution and transmission losses - 0.6 (c/kWh). Avoided market fees and ancillary service charges - 0.1 (c/kWh). Value of avoided social cost of carbon - 2.5 (c/kWh). FiT - 11.3 (c/kWh).

From 1 July 2019 (2019/20 fiscal year) the minimum electricity feed-in tariff for households and businesses who feed power back into the electricity grid from small renewable energy sources will be 12.0 cents per kilowatt hour (kWh). From 1 July 2018 the minimum electricity feed-in tariff for households and businesses who feed power back into the electricity grid from small renewable energy sources will be 9.9 cents per kilowatt hour (kWh). This is broken down as follows. Feed-in tariff component. Forecast solar-weighted average wholesale electricity pool cost - 6.8 (c/kWh). Value of avoided distribution and transmission losses - 0.5 (c/kWh). Avoided market fees and ancillary service charges - 0.1 (c/kWh). Value of avoided social cost of carbon - 2.5 (c/kWh). FiT - 9.9 cents per kilowatt hour (kWh). For the first time, retailers will be able pay solar system owners either a single-rate tariff or time-varying tariff. The single rate tariff is 9.9 cents per kilowatt hour. Under the time-varying tariff, customers will be credited between 7.1 cents and 29.0 cents per kilowatt hour of electricity exported, depending on the time of day.

=== Tasmania ===
On Tuesday, 3 March 2008, the Premier of Tasmania announced that the Government will consider a mid-year report on the introduction of minimum feed-in tariffs to support householders and small energy consumers using solar panels and other forms of domestic renewable energy and that provide surplus energy into the electricity grid.

=== Northern Territory ===
Northern Territory is yet to make an announcement on feed-in tariffs as a means of subsidising and encouraging solar PV, other than in relation to Alice Springs.

In 2006 there was a bid to make Alice Springs a Solar City. Australian Government funding would give four different regions in Australia the chance to become a Solar City and share $75 m funding to make solar power projects a reality. If successful, the Alice Springs project would involve solar power generation plus investigating energy efficiency, smart metering and tariff pricing.

In Alice Springs, an official Solar City, from May 2008 people with grid connected PV systems can sell all the solar electricity they generate back to Power and Water Corporation at 45 cents per kilowatt–hour, which is more than double the cost of purchasing electricity from the grid.

Outside of the Alice Springs Solar City area, people with Solar PV in the NT can arrange to sell their gross electricity production to the Power & Water Corporation of the Northern Territory at 14.38c. They can effectively use the grid as a bank and notionally re-purchase the electricity at night.

== Electricity retailers ==
Some electricity retailers are offering feed in tariff rates above the minimum stipulated by government. Many of the larger corporate retailers offer these incentives to capture larger proportions of the green electricity customer base, who are known to have lower churn rates.

Retailer	NSW	VIC	QLD	SA	WA	ACT	NT	TAS
Government Minimum	60c	60c	44c/8c	44c	40c	50.05c/40.04c*	45.76c/23.11c**	None
AGL	68c	68c	50c/6c	52c	-	-	-	-
ActewAGL	-	-	-	-	-	50.05c/40.04c*	-	-
Australian Power and Gas	-	60c	-	-	-	-	-	-
Aurora Energy	-	-	-	-	-	-	-	At purchase rate
Click Energy	64.9c / 10c	70c / 10c	55c / 11c	-	-	-	-	-
Country Energy	62c	60c	-	-	-	-	-	-
Diamond Energy	-	68c	-	-	-	-	-	-
EnergyAustralia	60c	60c	44c	-	-	50.05c/40.04c*	-	-
Energex	-	-	44c	-	-	-	-	-
Ergon	-	-	44c	-	-	-	-	-
Horizon Power	-	-	-	-	58.93c	-	-	-
Integral Energy	60c	-	44c	-	-	-	-	-
Alinta Energy	-	66c	-	44c	-	-	-	-
Origin Energy	66c	66c	50c	50c	-	-	-	-
Powershop	62c	67.2c	-	-	-	-	-	
Red Energy	66c	65.2c	-	-	-	-	-	-
Simply Energy	-	60c	-	44c	-	-	-	-
South Australian Electricity	-	-	-	44c	-	-	-	-
Synergy Energy	-	-	-	-	47c	-	-	-
NT Power and Water Authority	-	-	-	-	-	-	45.76c/23.11c**	-
Queensland Electricity	-	-	44c	-	-	-	-	-
TRUenergy	66c	66c	-	50c	-	-	-	-
Victorian Electricity	-	60c	-	-	-	-	-	-

* 50.05c below 10kW / 40.04c below 30kW system
** 45.76c capped at $5 per day, 23.11c for each kWh above $5 per day in Alice Springs, At purchase rate elsewhere in NT

== Council of Australian Governments ==
According to the COAG communiqué released in November 2008 COAG agreed to a set of national principles to apply to new feed-in tariff schemes and to inform the reviews of existing schemes. These principles will promote national consistency of schemes across Australia. According to the Communique the basic principles are:

1. Micro renewable generation to receive fair and reasonable value for exported energy
2. Any premium rate to be jurisdictionally determined, transitional and considered for public funding
3. Ministerial Council for Energy (MCE) to continue to advance fair treatment of small renewables
4. FiT policy to be consistent with previous COAG agreements (particularly the Australian Energy Market Agreement)

These principles do not appear to support a gross feed in tariff as exists in Germany, but rather a net feed in tariff.

== Opposition to feed-in tariffs ==
A Bill for a national feed-in tariff introduced by Senator Milne has not progressed after the Rudd government indicated it would not support such legislation. Some reasons were provided through the majority report of a Senate Committee examining the Bill. In the ACT, in February 2010, the ACT Independent Competition and Regulatory Commission proposed reducing the amount paid to RE generators under the Territory's FIT law.

It has been reported that NSW households could pay an extra $600 on their electricity bill over six years ($8.33/month) to cover the $2 billion cost of the tariff scheme. The total cost to families in some regional areas could be $1000.

== See also ==
- Photovoltaic engineering in Australia
- Energy policy of Australia
- PV financial incentives
- Power Purchase Agreement
- Renewable energy law
- Reverse auction
