= Collaboration on Energy and Environmental Markets =

The Collaboration on Energy and Environmental Markets (CEEM), formerly known as the Centre for Energy and Environmental Markets, at the University of New South Wales conducts interdisciplinary research into energy and environmental markets and associated policies. CEEM brings together researchers from the areas of Business, Engineering and Social Sciences. In addition to undertaking research, CEEM hosts short courses and seminars and participates in conferences in Australia and internationally. The centre also contributes to undergraduate teaching and to supervision of postgraduate students.

== See also ==
- Renewable energy commercialisation in Australia
- Mark Diesendorf
- Greenhouse Solutions with Sustainable Energy
