= White Cliffs Solar Power Station =

Australia's first solar power station

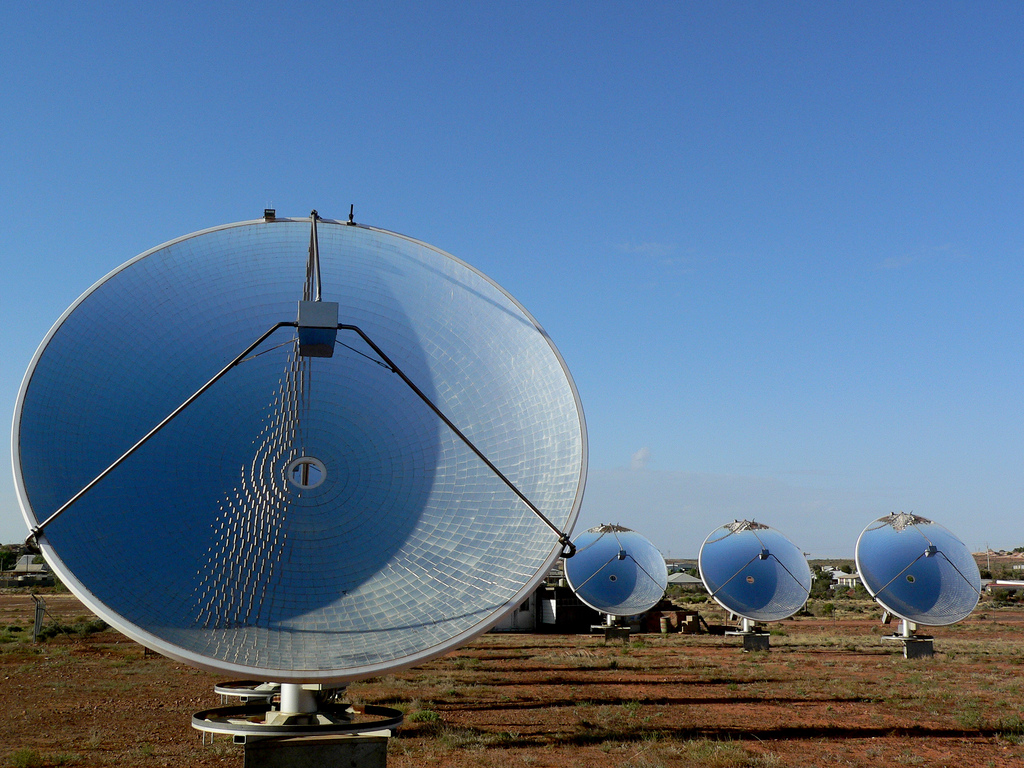
- Country: Australia
- Location: White Cliffs
- Coordinates: 30°51′20″S 143°05′19.4″E
- Status: Decommissioned
- Construction began: 1980
- Commission date: 1982
- Decommission date: December 2004
- Construction cost: AU$1,900,000

Solar farm
- Type: CSP
- CSP technology: Parabolic solar reflector
- Collectors: 14
- Total collector area: 280m^{2}

External links
- Commons: Related media on Commons

White Cliffs Solar Power Station was Australia's first solar power station. It is located at White Cliffs, New South Wales, which was chosen as it has the highest insolation in New South Wales, and in 1981 when the station was constructed had no grid connection. The site was heritage-listed in September 2026.

== History ==
The project began in 1981 as a research project by a team from Australian National University with funding from the state government. They constructed a power station consisting of 14 five-metre parabolic dishes, each covered with more than 2000 mirrors and mounted on a heliostatic mounting. The dishes each focussed the sun's rays on a collector, where water was boiled. The resulting steam drove a three-cylinder Uniflow steam engine, made by modifying a Lister diesel engine, delivering up to 25kWe. There were 150 two-volt batteries, which provided 24-hour power to selected buildings in the township, and an existing diesel generator retained to provide battery charging when either low insolation or strong winds prevented use of the solar station for extended periods. The local hospital, school, post office, and 12 homes were powered by the plant.

In 1996 or 1997, following grid connection of the township, the station was converted to photovoltaic. The dishes were resurfaced, and the original collectors each replaced by a cluster of 16 water-cooled photovoltaic cells. In its new form, the station delivered up to 45kWe. The batteries and diesel generator were removed, and the output fed into the grid. The grid-connected power station ran for around six years, generating valuable data on the longterm performance and efficiency of the modules.

The power station ceased operation in December 2004 and was resumed by the owner of the site.

== Significance and legacy ==
White Cliffs Solar Power Station was the model on which all future solar technology has been based, across the world.

In 2006 Engineers Australia placed a heritage marker "recognising the engineering significance of what is arguably considered the world's first commercial solar power station". It was one of the first in the world to sell electricity generated by solar power, and Engineers Australia described it as the equivalent of the Snowy Mountains Scheme or the Sydney Harbour Bridge in its historical significance.

In 2012 it was proposed the site be used as a museum.

Around 2018, the White Cliffs Solar Thermal Power Station Friends Inc was founded by Graeme Hanigan, who had spotted the dishes by chance when driving through the region, and thought that it needed to be preserved. In September 2026, the power station was listed on the NSW State Heritage Register.
