= Andrew Blakers =

Australian academic

Andrew Blakers AO FAA FTSE FRSN
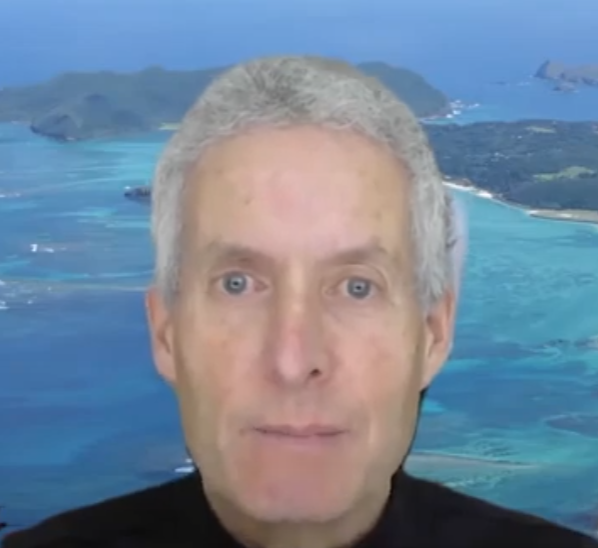
- In an online discussion in 2020
- Occupation: Professor
- Employer: Australian National University
- Awards: Eureka Prize (2018); Queen Elizabeth Prize for Engineering (2023)

Andrew Blakers AO FAA FTSE FRSN is a professor of renewable energy engineering at the Australian National University. He has contributed to several innovations in solar photovoltaic technology, including PERC solar cells. Blakers has secured many research grants and won several awards.

== Solar research group at ANU ==
Blakers founded the solar research group at ANU in 1991. It comprises about 60 staff and students who work on silicon, perovskite and tandem solar cells.

== PERC solar cells ==
PERC solar photovoltaic technology is used in about 80% of solar panels deployed around the globe. Cumulative PERC solar panel sales are about US$150 billion. PERC solar panels are mitigating about 3% of global emissions through displacement of coal generation.

== Sliver cells ==
Sliver Cell photovoltaic technology uses one tenth of the silicon used in conventional solar panels. Blakers invented the technology with colleague Prof Klaus Weber and developed it with funding from energy supplier Origin Energy and the Australian Research Council.

== 100% renewable energy futures ==
Blakers and colleagues work on 100% renewable energy futures. This entails hour-by-hour modelling over decades of supply of energy (mostly from solar and wind) and demand for energy. Sufficient solar, wind, storage and transmission is added to the model to ensure sufficient supply of energy at all times. The levelized cost of a balanced 100% renewable energy system (dollars per Megawatt-hour) can then be calculated. National energy systems have been modeled for Australia, Japan, ASEAN, Bolivia, Indonesia and other countries.

== Global atlas of pumped hydro energy storage ==
Blakers and colleagues have produced global atlases showing millions of off-river (closed loop) pumped hydro energy storage potential sites around the world that can be used to support 100% renewable energy.

== Honours ==
Blakers won the Clunies Ross Technology Innovation Award of the Australian Academy of Technological Sciences and Engineering in 2024.

Blakers, Martin Green, Jianhua Zhao and Aihua Wang won the Queen Elizabeth Prize for Engineering in 2023 for development of the PERC solar cell.

Blakers, Matt Stocks and Bin Lu won the 2018 Eureka Prize for Environmental Research for work on 100% renewable energy futures.

Blakers was 2012 state finalist for the Australian of the year award, in the Australian Capital Territory.

Blakers and Klaus Weber won the 2007 Australian Institute of Physics' Walsh Medal for their solar research work.

Blakers and colleagues won the 2005 Banksia Award for Environmental Leadership in Infrastructure & Services.

Blakers is a Fellow of the Australian Academy of Science, the Australian Academy of Technological Sciences and Engineering, the Australian Institute of Physics, the Australian Institute of Energy and the Royal Society of New South Wales. He is a life member of the International Solar Energy Society, the Australian Association of von Humboldt Fellows and the Australian Conservation Foundation.

He was elected a Fellow of the Australian Academy of Science in 2024. In the 2025 Australia Day Honours, he was appointed Officer of the Order of Australia (AO) for distinguished service to science in the field of solar cell development, and as an advocate for energy storage and renewable technologies.

== See also ==
- Martin Green
- Pumped storage hydropower
- Solar Cell
- Solar energy
- Solar power in Australia
- Photovoltaic and renewable energy engineering in Australia
- Renewable energy commercialization
- International Renewable Energy Agency
