= Photovoltaic engineering in Australia =

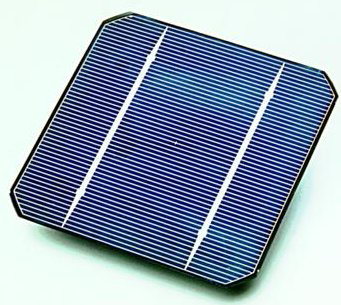
Photovoltaic cells produce electricity directly from sunlight

Photovoltaic and renewable energy engineering is an area of research, development, and demonstration in Australia. Two Australian Research Council Centres play a role.

== School of Photovoltaic and Renewable Energy Engineering ==
The School of Photovoltaic and Renewable Energy Engineering at the University of NSW offers undergraduate training and postgraduate and research training opportunities in the area of photovoltaics and solar energy. It is widely recognised for its research in the area of photovoltaics, most of which is now conducted under the ARC Centre of Excellence for Advanced Silicon Photovoltaics and Photonics.

== School of Engineering and Energy ==
The School of Engineering and Energy at Murdoch University offers a degree programs in physics, nanotechnology, engineering and energy.

== ARC Centre of Excellence for Advanced Silicon Photovoltaics and Photonics ==
The ARC Centre of Excellence for Advanced Silicon Photovoltaics and Photonics opened on 13 June 2003. The Centre is engaged in silicon photovoltaic research and applying these advances to the related field of photonics. The Centre is made up of five research teams seeking ways of improving the efficiency and cost of silicon based photovoltaic and photonic devices.

PERL Solar Cell	Passivated emitter rear locally diffused (PERL) solar cell developed at UNSW.
Semiconductor Fingers	Semiconductor finger technology was developed at UNSW. Fingers of heavily doped semiconductor running parallel to front surface electrical contacts reduce the effect of the dead layer of commercial solar cells.
CSG	Crystalline silicon on glass (CSG) solar cells developed at UNSW are thin-film silicon devices directly onto glass. The technology is now in commercial production in Germany being produced by CSG Solar AG.

== ARC Centre of Excellence for Solar Energy Systems ==
The focus for the ARC Centre of Excellence for Solar Energy Systems is the development of improved silicon concentrator solar cells for 10-50 sun linear concentrators. Centre activities are located at the Centre for Sustainable Energy Systems in the Faculty of Engineering and Information Technology at the Australian National University. The Director of the ARC Centre for Solar Energy Systems is Professor Andrew Blakers and the Deputy Director is Dr Vernie Everett.

SLIVER Cell (TM)	Using a fraction of the costly and limited supply of silicon used in conventional solar panels while matching power, performance, and efficiency. Professor Andrew Blakers, Director of the Australian National University Centre for Sustainable Energy Systems, invented the technology with colleague Dr Klaus Weber and developed it with funding from energy supplier Origin Energy and the Australian Research Council. Blakers and Weber won the Australian Institute of Physics' Walsh Medal for their work. Origin Energy is developing SLIVER modules for commercialisation at its pilot plant in Regency Park, South Australia.
Dye Sensitised	Dye Sensitised cells are photoelectrochemical solar cells. Manufacturing techniques developed at ANU lead to commercialisation of the technology at Dyesol in Queanbeyan, NSW.

== Innovation ==
A sound barrier composed of solar panels helps light a section of the Tullamarine Calder Interchange in northern Melbourne and received an award.

== See also ==
- High efficiency solar cells
- Martin Green
- Renewable energy in Australia
- Solar power in Australia
- Shi Zhengrong
