= Mandatory renewable energy target =

Mandatory renewable energy targets are part of government-legislated schemes which require electricity vendors to source specific amounts of aggregate electricity sales from renewable energy sources according to a fixed time frame. The objective of these schemes is to promote renewable energy and decrease dependency on fossil fuels. If this results in an additional expenditure of electricity, the additional cost is distributed across customers by increases in other tariffs. The cost of this measure is therefore not funded by the government budgets, except for costs of establishing and monitoring the scheme and any audit and enforcement actions. As the cost of renewable energy has become lower than that of other sources, meeting and exceeding a renewable energy target will also reduce the expenditure of electricity to consumers.

== Country Participation ==
At least 67 countries have renewable energy policy targets of some kind. In Europe, 28 European Union members states and 8 Energy Community Contracting Parties have legally binding renewable energy targets. The European-Union target is 42.5% by 2030. The United States does not have a federally-mandated target, but several states do. Canada has set goals for 2035 and 2050. China's 15th five-year plan aims for increased use of non-fossil-fuel energy sources by 2030. Around the world, targets are typically for shares of electricity production, but some are defined as by primary energy supply, installed capacity, CO2 emissions, or otherwise.

== Overview ==
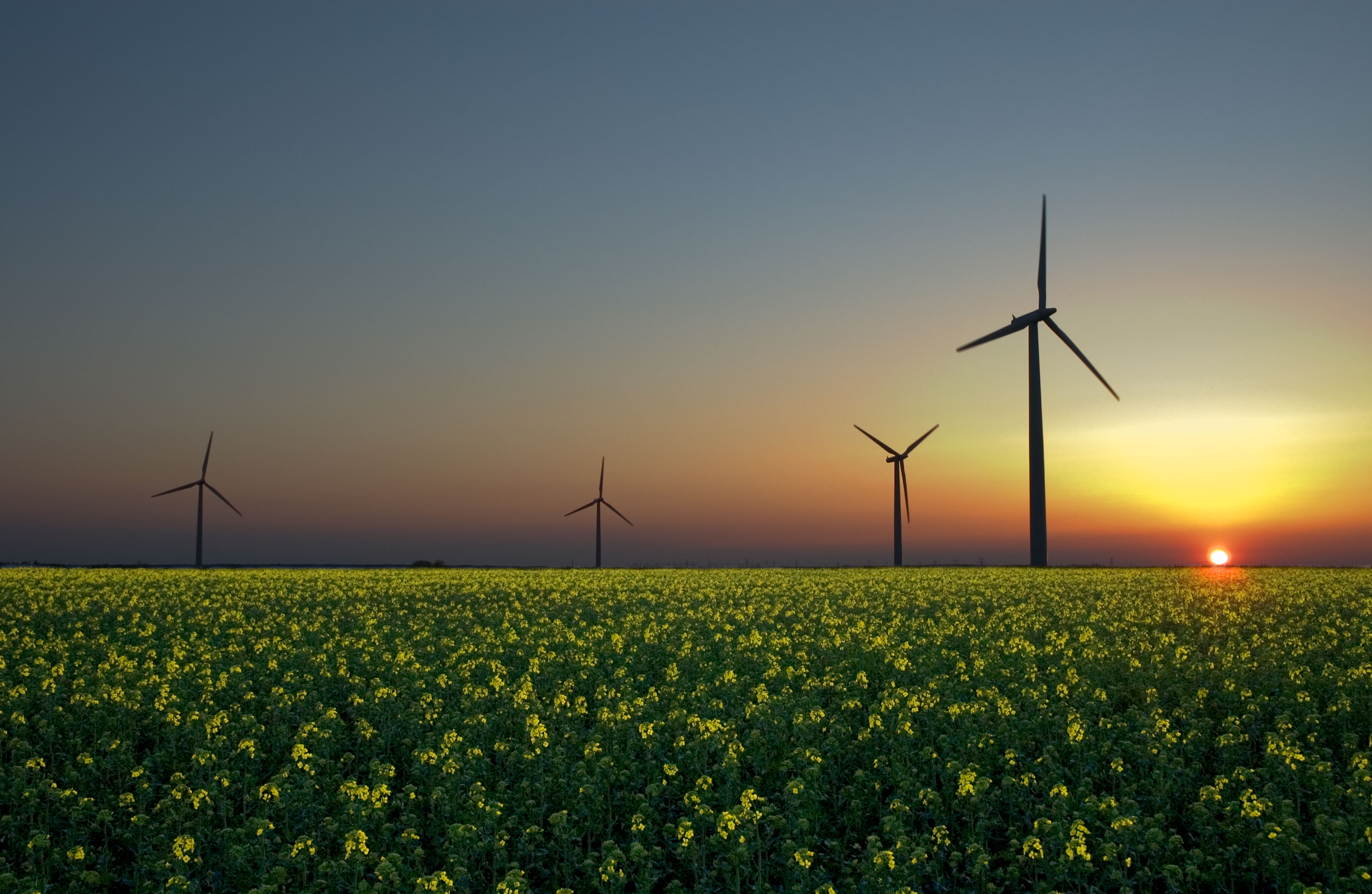
The wind, sunlight, and biomass are three renewable energy sources.

Renewable energy technologies are essential contributors to the energy supply portfolio, as they contribute to world energy security, reduce dependency on fossil fuels, and provide opportunities for mitigating greenhouse gases. The International Energy Agency has defined three generations of renewable energy technologies, reaching back over 100 years:

- First-generation technologies emerged from the Industrial Revolution at the end of the 19th century and include hydropower, biomass combustion, geothermal power and heat. These technologies are quite widely used.
- Second-generation technologies include solar heating and cooling, wind power, modern forms of bioenergy, and solar photovoltaics. These are now entering markets as a result of research, development and demonstration (RD&D) investments since the 1980s. Initial investment was prompted by energy security concerns linked to the oil crises (1973 and 1979) of the 1970s but the enduring appeal of these technologies is due, at least in part, to environmental benefits.
- Third-generation technologies are still under development and include advanced biomass gasification, biorefinery technologies, concentrating solar thermal power, hot-dry-rock geothermal power, and ocean energy.

First-generation technologies are well established. However, second-generation technologies and third-generation technologies depend on further promotion by the public sector. The introduction of mandatory renewable energy targets is one important way in which governments can encourage the wider use of renewables.

== Targets by country ==
=== Australia ===
In 2001, the federal government introduced a Mandatory Renewable Energy Target (MRET) of 9,500 GWh of new generation, with the scheme running until at least 2020. This represents an increase of new renewable electricity generation of about 4% of Australia's total electricity generation and a doubling of renewable generation from 1997 levels. Australia's renewable energy target did not cover heating or transport energy like Europe's or China's, Australia's target was therefore equivalent of approximately 5% of all energy from renewable sources.

An Expanded Renewable Energy Target was passed on 20 August 2009, to ensure that renewable energy obtains a 20% share of electricity supply in Australia by 2020. To ensure this, the Labor government committed that the MRET will increase from 9,500 gigawatt-hours to 45,000 gigawatt-hours by 2020. The scheme was to continue until 2030. After 2020, the proposed Emissions Trading Scheme and improved efficiencies from innovation and manufacture was expected to allow the MRET to be phased out by 2030. The target was criticised as unambitious and ineffective in reducing Australia's fossil fuel dependency, as it only applied to generated electricity, but not to the 77% of energy production exported, nor to energy sources which are not used for electricity generation, such as the oil used in transportation. Thus 20% renewable energy in electricity generation would represent less than 2% of total energy production in Australia.

In 2011 the 'expanded MRET' was split into two schemes: a Large-scale Renewable Energy Target (LRET) of 41,000 GWh for utility-scale renewable generators, and an uncapped Small-scale Renewable Energy Scheme for small household and commercial-scale generators. Following the 2014 Warburton Review initiated by the Abbott government, and subsequent negotiations with the Labor Opposition, in June 2015 the LRET target was reduced to 33,000 GWh.

As of October 2025 the 33,000 GWh annual target remains in place. Based on this annual target there has been a goal set to achieve 82% renewable energy generation by 2030, however, the government has no official law mandating this.

Individual Australian states and territories have also set their own targets, such as Victoria with a 95% by 2035 target, and the ACT of 100% renewables by 2020 (achieved in 2019). In October 2025, Queensland's Liberal National Government repealed the former Labor government's target of 80% renewables by 2035. Similar changes occurred in the Northern Territory where in March 2025 the Country Liberal Party scrapped a target of 50% renewables by 2030 set by the previous Labor government in 2016, despite having supported this target whilst being in opposition.

=== United States ===
As of July 2010, 30 US states and DC have established mandatory renewable energy targets, and a further three have voluntary targets. The Energy Independence and Security Act of 2007 has set a target for 36 billion US gallons (140,000,000 m^{3}) of biofuel produced annually by 2022. Of that, 21 billion US gallons (79,000,000 m^{3}) shall be advanced biofuels (derived from feedstock other than corn starch). Of the 21 billion US gallons (79,000,000 m^{3}), 16 billion shall come from cellulosic ethanol. The remaining 5 billion US gallons (19,000,000 m^{3}) shall come from biomass-based diesel and other advanced biofuels. For sources other than biofuels, The United States carries no mandatory renewable energy targets although they do support the growth of renewable energy industries with subsidies, feed-in tariffs, tax exemptions, and other financial support measures.

== Renewable energy targets by region ==
The European Union (EU) has a renewable energy target of 42.5% renewables target by 2030.

Latin America pledged 70% renewable energy by 2030.

The West African States (ECOWAS) aim for 38% renewable energy by 2030 achieved through the creation of 20GW of solar. The African Union also aims for a minimum of 10GW of renewable energy on the continent by 2030.

== Table of renewable energy and targets ==
=== Overview ===
Region	Current share	Target	Year	Mandatory	Notes
World	33.3% global capacity 26% global power generation	N/A, varies by country			
EU-25	14%	21%	2020		
EU	20% in 2020 17.5% in 2017	35%	2030		

=== European countries ===
Country	Current share %	Target	Target year	Mandatory	Notes	Ref
Albania	34.9%	38%	2030		Targets are for primary energy consumption. 95% of electrical energy is produced from renewables (mainly hydropower).	
Austria	33.5%	78%				
Belgium	16%	Belgian energy and climate plan proposes renewables target of 18.3% by 2030				
Bulgaria	18.7%	27%	2030			
Czech Republic	14.8%					
Croatia	27.3%					
Cyprus	9.9%					
Denmark	35%	100%	2035			
Estonia	30%	The share of renewable energy will account for 50% of final consumption of domestic electricity and 80% of the heat generated	2030			
Finland	41%	Finland will go carbon neutral	2035			
France	23%	40% by 2030 33% of its energy from renewable sources by 2030	2030		Renewables can regularly cover 25% of France's summer electricity needs, grid operator RTE said on Wednesday.	
Germany	47%	40-45% of total electricity consumption	2025			
Greece	16.3%	35%	2030			
Hungary	13.3%					
Ireland	10.7%	70%	2030			
Italy	18.3%	25%				
Latvia	39%	Latvia is proposed to set a 45% RES target for 2030	2030			
Lithuania	27.9%	38% by 2025 45% by 2030 and around 80% by 2050				
Norway	100%					
Iceland	100%					
Luxembourg	6.4%					
Malta	7.2%					
Netherlands	6.6%					
Poland	14%					
Portugal	58%	80%	2026			
Romania	24.5%					
Slovakia	11.5%	31%				
Slovenia	21.5%					
Spain	17.5%	100%	2050			
Sweden	54.5%	100%	2040			
Switzerland	60%	100%	2050			
United Kingdom	40%	100%	2050			

=== Other countries ===
Country	Current share	Target	Target year	Mandatory	Notes	Ref
Argentina	2%	20%	2025			
Australia	23.5%	23.5% by 2020 predicted to produce 35% by 2021 projected to produce 50% renewable energy by 2030	2030			
Brazil	50%					
Canada	67%	Carbon neutral by 2050	2050		Canada aims to generate 90% of its electrical energy from non-emitting sources by 2030. Already, it generates 82% from non-emitting sources with 67% of electrical energy production being from renewables.	
Chile	17.6% (2019)	20%	2025			
Chile	17.6% (2019)	70%	2030			
China	12% 2015	35%	2030			
Egypt	10%	20%	2020			
Eritrea		70%	2030			
Greenland	70%					
India	21.4%	40% by 2030 and 500GW by 2030	2030			
Indonesia	4%	15% (inc. nuclear)	2025			
Israel	0%	5%	2016			
Japan	0.4%	1.63%	2014			
Kazakhstan		3%	2020		Targets refer to electrical energy generation. Kazakhstan has a 2060 carbon neutrality target.	
Kazakhstan		30%	2030		Targets refer to electrical energy generation. Kazakhstan has a 2060 carbon neutrality target.	
Kazakhstan		50%	2050		Targets refer to electrical energy generation. Kazakhstan has a 2060 carbon neutrality target.	
Malaysia		35% (electrical)	2025			
Malaysia		25% (primary energy supply)	2025			
Mexico	26%	35% by 2024 and 50% by 2050	2024			
Morocco	10%	20%	2012			
New Zealand	80%	100%	2035			
Nigeria		7%	2025			
Oman		16%	2025			
Oman		30%	2030			
Pakistan		10%	2015			
Philippines		100% increase from 2005	2015			
Russia		2.5%	2024			
South Africa		26%	2030			
South Korea		6.08%	2020			
Taiwan	6%	12%	2020			
Thailand	7%	20%	2022			
UAE		50%	2050			
United States	23%	100%	2035		Proposed and promised by US president Joe Biden.	
Vietnam		5%	2020			

== See also ==
- REN21
- Collaboration on Energy and Environmental Markets
- Greenhouse Mafia
- Greenhouse Solutions with Sustainable Energy
- List of renewable energy topics by country and territory
