= List of wind farms in Victoria =

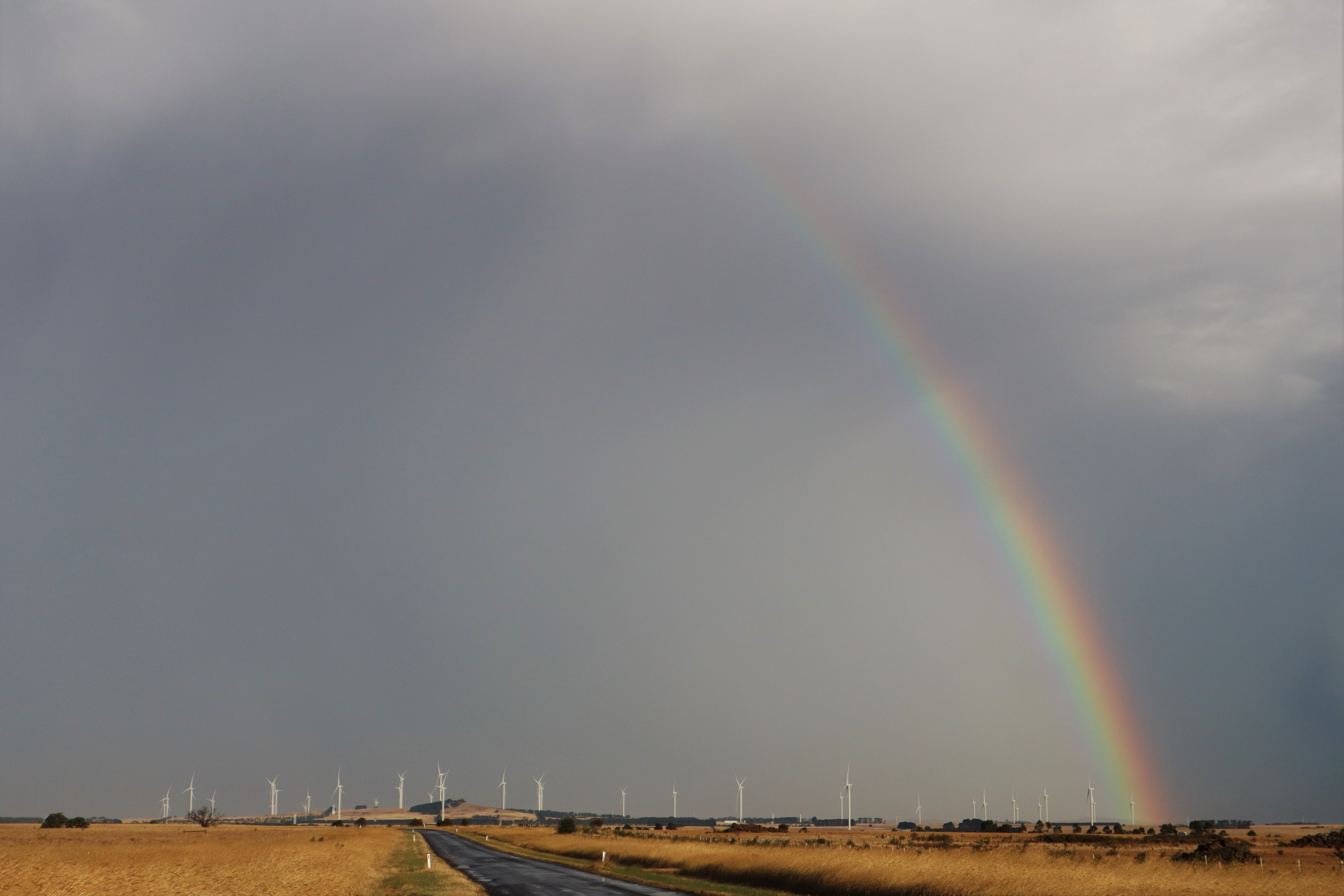
A rainbow covering a wind farm in Western Victoria

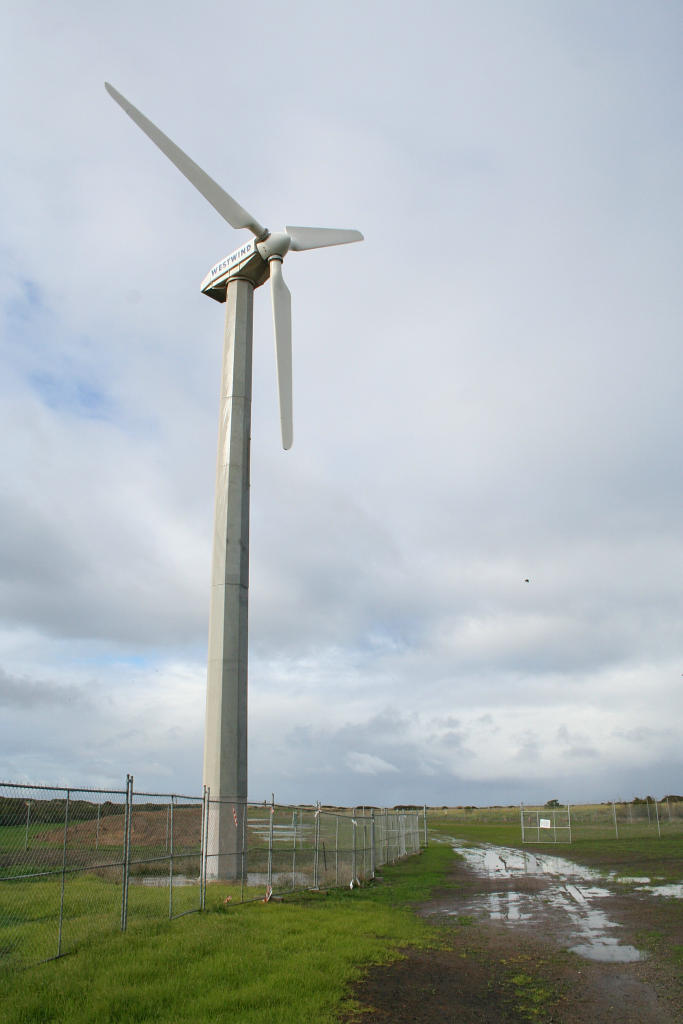
Wind generator at Breamlea, built in 1987, photo taken in 2007

Victoria has some of the best wind resources in Australia, along the southern coast and in the higher altitude areas. Most of Victoria's wind farms are being built along the southern coast and around the Ballarat, Ararat, and Hamilton areas.

The total capacity for the state as of 2021 was around 2,888.3 MW. Several wind farms are under construction while several more have been proposed and approved. The total potential capacity of wind turbines in Victoria including those currently operational, those under construction, and approved proposals is around 8,000 MW. By comparison, Victoria's total peak electricity usage is around 8,000–10,000 MW.

== Wind farms in Victoria ==
This is a list of wind farms in Victoria, Australia with a generating capacity of more than 4 MW.

Project name	Sponsoring company	Coordinates	Turbines	Capacity (MW)	Status	Completion date	Notes
Ararat Wind Farm	RES Australia	37.244752°S 142.984501°E	75	240	Operating	May 2017	
Bald Hills Wind Farm	Mitsui	38.768°S 145.911°E	52	106	Operating	July 2015	
Bulgana	Neoen	37°5′51″S 142°58′25″E	56	194	Operating	August 2019	
Challicum Hills Wind Farm	Pacific Hydro	37.382939°S 143.088676°E	35	52.5	Operating	August 2003	
Chepstowe Wind Farm	Future Wind	37.589°S 143.510°E	3	6.1	Operating	April 2015	
Cherry Tree Wind Farm	Infigen Energy		16	57.6	Operating	June 2020	
Codrington Wind Farm	Pacific Hydro	38.273565°S 141.976055°E	14	18.2	Operating	2001	
Coonooer Bridge	Windlab Limited	36.4362°S 143.3616°E	6	19.8	Operating	March 2016	
Crowlands	Pacific Hydro	37.150°S 143.090°E	39	80	Operating	November 2019	
Dundonnell Wind Farm (Mortlake)	Tilt Renewables	37°54′S 143°0′E	80	336	Operating	January 2021	
Ferguson	BayWa re		3	9	Operating		
Kiata Wind Farm	WindLab	36.22°S 141.47°E	9	31.5	Operating	2018	
Lal Lal Wind Farm	WestWind Energy	37.754°S 144.000°E; 37.626°S 144.021°E	64	220	Operating		Approved April 2009, amended March 2017
Leonards Hill Wind Farm	Hepburn Wind	37.425°S 144.120°E	2	4.1	Operating	July 2011	
Macarthur Wind Farm	AGL Energy/Meridian Energy	38.040°S 142.025°E	140	420	Operating	January 2013	
Maroona Wind Farm	Future Energy	37.430°S 142.824°E	2	7.2	Operating		
Mortons Lane Wind Farm (Woodhouse)	Tian Run Australia	37.835°S 142.450°E	13	19.5	Operating	May 2012	
Mount Gellibrand Wind Farm	Acciona Energy	38.230°S 143.765°E	44	132	Operating		
Mount Mercer Wind Farm	Meridian Energy	37.841°S 143.871°E	64	131	Operating	September 2014	
Murra Warra Wind Farm Stage 1	RES Australia/ Macquarie Group	36.431°S 142.321°E	61	225.7	Operating		
Oaklands Hill Wind Farm	AGL Energy	37.68°S 142.55°E	32	67.2	Operating	April 2012	
Portland Wind Farm Stage 1: Yambuk	Pacific Hydro	38.300°S 142.003°E	20	30	Operating	May 2007	
Portland Wind Farm Stage 2: Cape Bridgewater	Pacific Hydro	38.375°S 141.395°E	29	58	Operating	October 2009	
Portland Wind Farm Stage 3: Cape Nelson South	Pacific Hydro	38.425°S 141.535°E	22	44	Operating	July 2009	
Portland Wind Farm Stage 4: Cape Sir William Grant and Cape Nelson North	Pacific Hydro	38.400°S 141.620°E	23	47	Operating	February 2015	
Salt Creek Wind Farm (Woorndoo)	Tilt Renewables	37.945°S 142.630°E	15	50	Operating		
Timboon West	Epic Energy	38.528°S 142.916°E	2	7.2	Operating	December 2018	Planning approved Mar 2017
Toora Wind Farm	Transfield Infrastructure Fund	38.656730°S 146.340926°E	12	21	Operating	2002	
Waubra Wind Farm	Acciona Energy/ ANZ Infrastructure Services	37.365533°S 143.624289°E	128	192	Operating	2009	
Wonthaggi Wind Farm	Wind Power Pty Ltd	38.603°S 145.545°E	6	12	Operating	2005	
Yaloak South Wind Farm	Pacific Hydro	37.660°S 143.635°E	14	28.7	Operating	June 2018	
Yawong	Epic Energy	36.481°S 143.367°E	2	7.2	Operating	December 2018	
Berrybank Wind Farm	Global Power Generation Australia	37.94°S 143.52°E	42	180	Operating	July 2021	A 43rd turbine collapsed on 4 February, 2025
Moorabool Wind Farm	WestWind Energy	37.703°S 144.176°E	107	321	Operating		Partial generation
Diapur	BayWa re		3	9	Operating	Completion end of 2021	
Mortlake South Wind Farm	Acciona Energy		35	157.5	Operating	expected completion mid of 2022	
Murra Warra Wind Farm Stage 2	RES Australia/ Macquarie Group	36.431°S 142.321°E	55	203.5	Operating		Planning approved Nov 2016
Stockyard Hill Wind Farm	Goldwind Australia	37°32′9″S 143°15′5″E	149	530	Operating	2022	
Berrimal Wind farm	Acciona Energy	36.510°S 143.455°E	24	72	Planning approved		Planning approved September 2014 Under review 2018
Golden Plains Wind Farm	WestWind Energy		215	756 (1), 577 (2)	Under construction, operating	2027	
Hawkesdale Wind Farm	Global Power Generation Australia	38.11°S 142.36°E	26	104	Planning approved		Approved Aug 2008, amended December 2017
Rifle Butts	NewEn		13	40	Planning approved		
Ryan Corner Wind Farm	Global Power Generation Australia	38.31°S 142.15°E	56	224	Planning approved		Planning approved Aug 2008, amended December 2017
Woolsthorpe (Naroghid)	Wind Farm Developments	38.245°S 143.070°E	20	46	Planning approved		Approved April 2008, amended May 2017
Jung	BayWa re		2	8.4	Planning approved		
Darlington	Unión Fenosa Wind Australia	38.00°S 142.94°E	75	375	Seeking approval		
Dean	Wind Power Pty Ltd	37.465°S 143.995°E		20	Proposed		
Pyrenees	Wind Power Pty Ltd	37.050°S 143.780°E		200	Proposed		
The Sisters Wind Farm	Wind Farm Developments			30	Proposed		
Korumburra	Wind Power Pty Ltd	38.425°S 145.830°E		12	Feasibility		
Portland	Wind Power Pty Ltd			17.5	Feasibility		
Sidonia Hills	Hydro Tasmania	37.215°S 144.510°E		120	Feasibility		
Tarrone	Unión Fenosa Wind Australia	37.68°S 142.55°E	19	60	Feasibility		
Alberton	Synergy Wind		34	115	Seeking approval		
Inverleigh	Wind Farm Developments		16	76.8	Seeking approval		
Mount Fyans	Woolnorth Wind Farms		85	400	Seeking approval		
Baynton	Stanwell Corporation and WindLab Systems	37.145°S 144.675°E		50	Cancelled		
Carrajung	Synergy Wind			30	Cancelled		
Discovery Bay				30	Cancelled		
Dollar	AGL Energy	38.580°S 146.200°E		80	Cancelled		
Newfield	Acciona Energy	38.558°S 143.015°E		22.5	Cancelled		
Penshurst	RES Australia		223	758	Cancelled		

Summary of Victoria-wide total production in MW

Status	Capacity (MW)
Operating	2888.3
Under construction	1559.9
Planning approved	834.6
Seeking approval	2020
Total in Victoria	7834.8

== See also ==
- Energy in Victoria
- List of power stations in Victoria
- Wind power in Australia
- Renewable energy commercialization
