= Challicum Hills Wind Farm =

Wind farm in Victoria, Australia

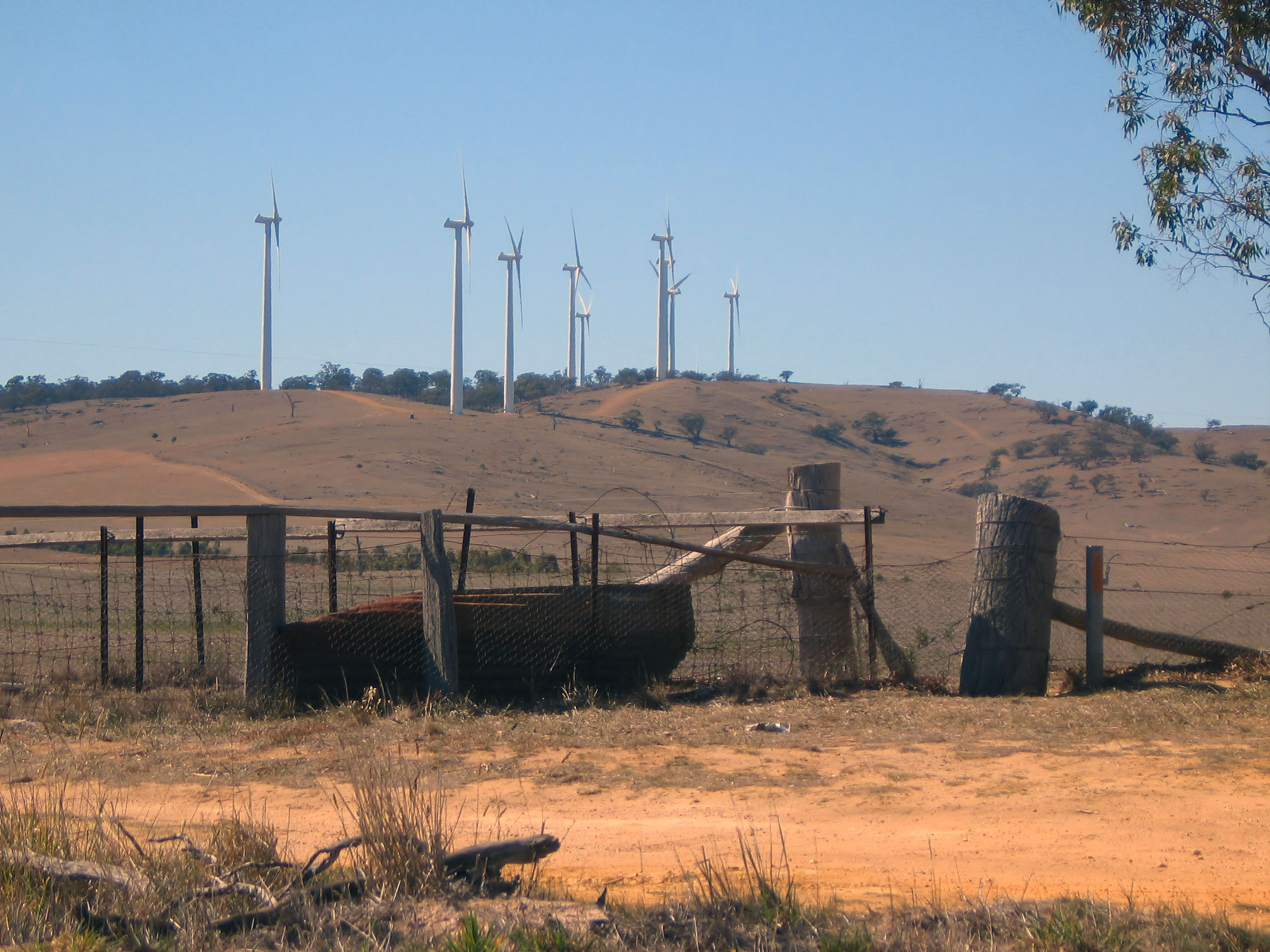
- Challicum Hills Wind Farm
- Country: Australia
- Location: Ararat, Victoria
- Coordinates: 37.38°S 143.11°E
- Status: Operational
- Construction began: October 2002
- Commission date: November 2003
- Construction cost: $46,000,000
- Owner: Pacific Blue
- Operator: TW Power Services

Wind farm
- Type: Onshore
- Site usage: farming land
- Hub height: 68 m (223 ft)
- Rotor diameter: 64 m (210 ft)
- Rated wind speed: 57 km/h (15.8 m/s)
- Site elevation: 400 m (1,312 ft)

Power generation
- Units operational: 35
- Make and model: NEG Micon: NM64/1500
- Nameplate capacity: 52.5 MW
- Annual net output: 141 GWh

External links
- Website: www.pacificblue.com.au/our-energy-production/operating-sites/challicum-hills-wind-farm
- Commons: Related media on Commons

Challicum Hills Wind Farm is a wind farm encompassed by 35 (1.5 MW) NEG NM 64 wind turbines, with a total generating capacity of 52.5 MW of electricity. The wind farm is near Ararat in western Victoria, Australia. The power station was commissioned in August 2003 and is in a long term Power Purchase Agreement (PPA) with Origin Energy.

The wind farm is owned and operated by Pacific Blue. Part of the profits flow into a community fund that supports local projects.

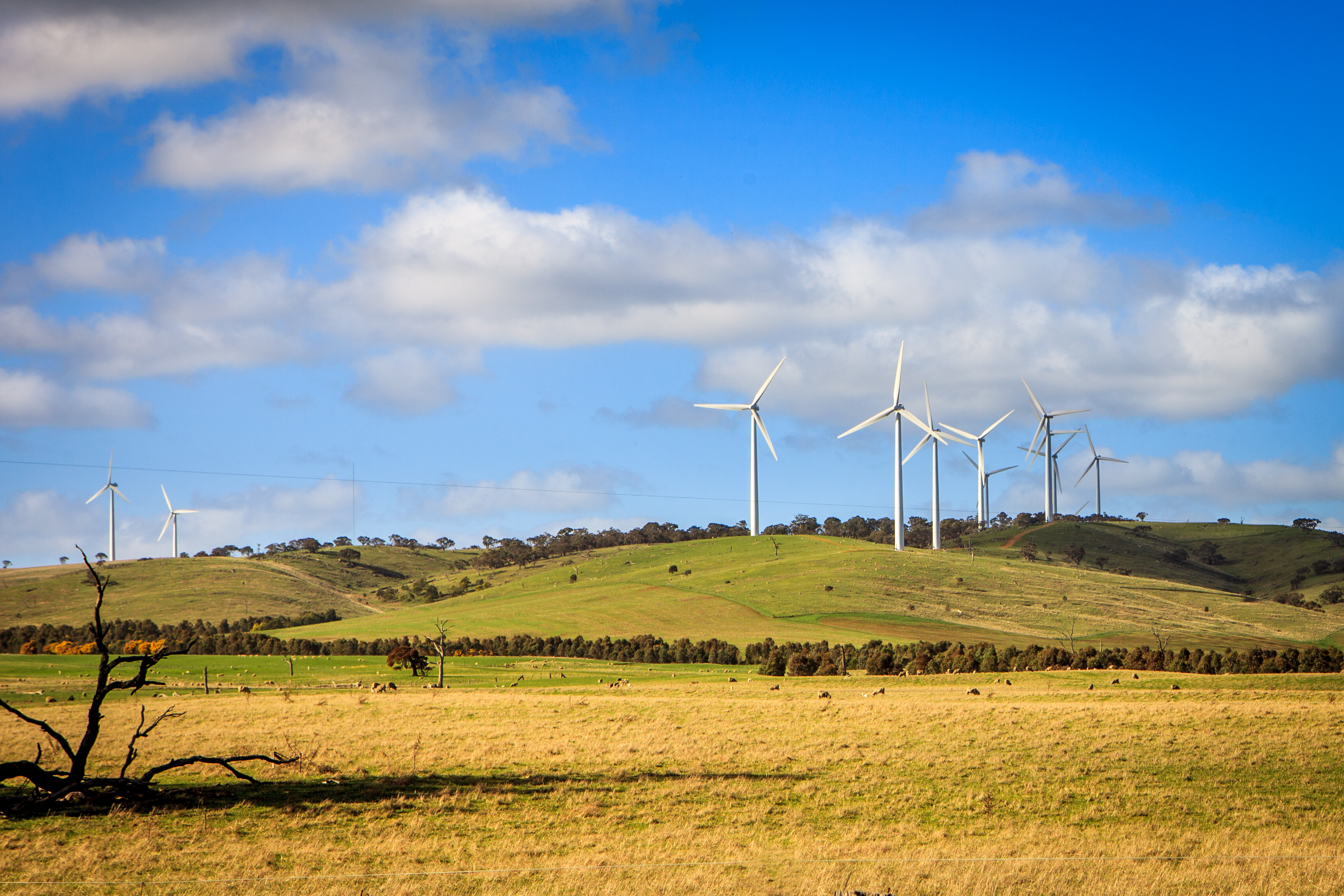
Challicum Hills Wind Farm

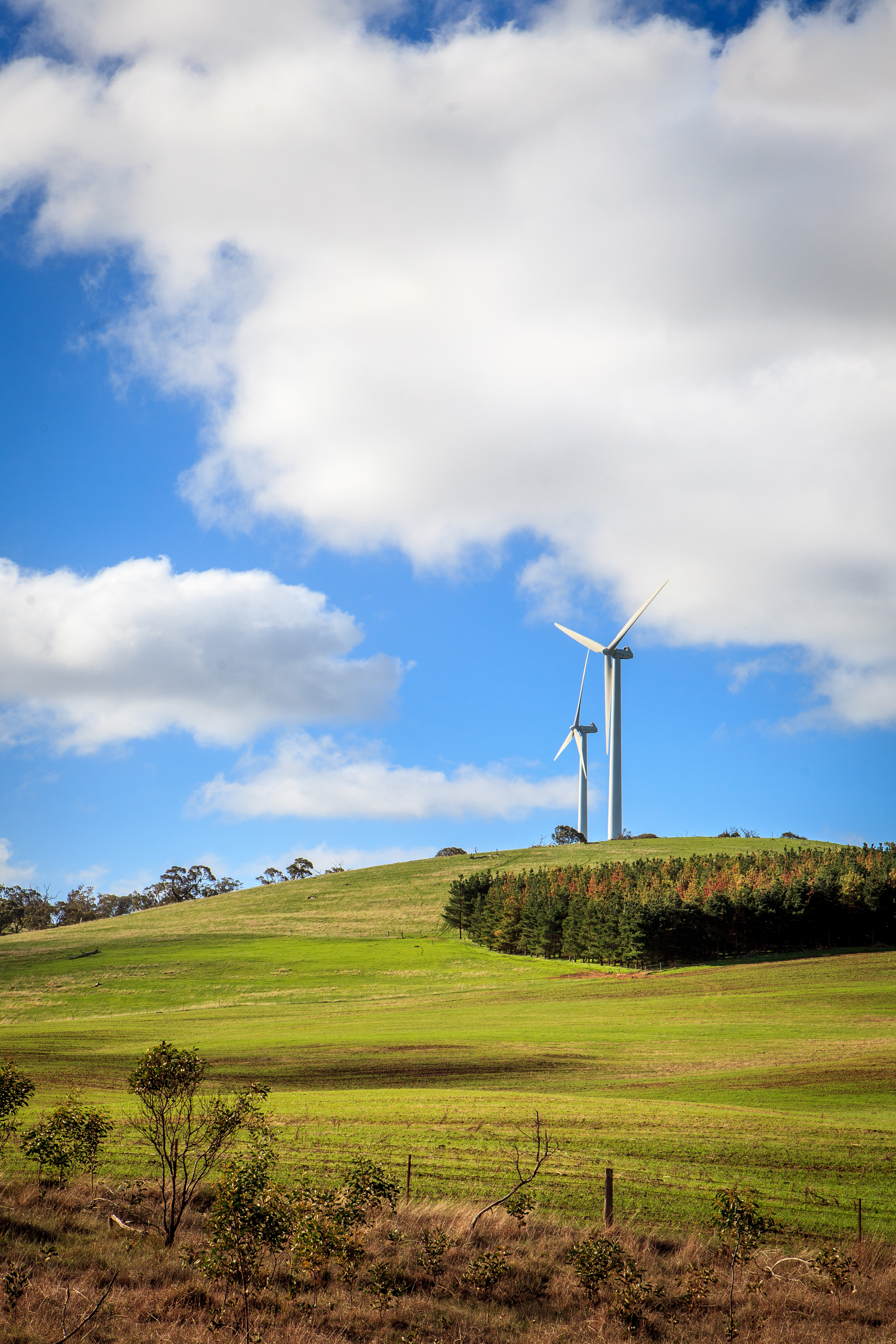
A vertical shot of Challicum Hills Wind Farm

== See also ==
- List of wind farms in Victoria
- Wind power in Australia
