= First Flight wind farm =

Proposed wind farm in the Irish Sea

- Country: Northern Ireland
- Location: Irish Sea, off County Down coast
- Coordinates: 54.086°N 5.634°W
- Status: Canceled

Wind farm
- Type: Offshore

Power generation
- Nameplate capacity: ~300-400MW

External links
- Website: www.firstflightwind.com

First Flight wind farm was a late 2000s proposed offshore wind farm in the Irish Sea, southeast of the southern coast of County Down, Northern Ireland.

== History ==
In 2009 the Department of Enterprise, Trade and Investment of Northern Ireland published a draft strategic plan for offshore renewable energy, which proposed a target of 600MW offshore wind by 2020. a study examined the Northern Ireland coastline to the 12 nm limit, and identified two potential wind farm sites: one northeast of Lough Foyle and north of Portstewart (Zone 1) with estimatated capacity 600MW); and one east of County Down, (Zone 2) with estimated capacity 900MW. Taking into account acceptable levels of negative environmental impact the developable wind zones were estimated at yielding 300 and 600MW of generating capacity respectively.

In December 2011 The Crown Estate began a tendering process for offshore renewable energy in Northern Ireland, including a 600MW wind farm site off the County Down coast, the wind farm site was within a smaller area of the region identified by the 2009 study. The wind farm site was ~8 km from the coast of Ireland, with an area of 438 square kilometres (169 sq mi), with water depths of 20 to 60 m (66 to 197 ft). In October 2012 First Flight Wind consortium (DONG Energy Power (UK) Limited, Renewable Energy Systems Limited (RES) and B9 Energy Offshore Developments Limited.) was awarded the development rights to the wind farm zone: the company estimated that around 150 square kilometres (58 sq mi) would need to be developed for a wind farm of 600MW capacity.

In 2014 First Flight Wind published an environmental scoping report for consultation. The developing company's initial (2014) estimates of the development process are for development of an application to be submitted c.2016, which if consented (period less than 1 year) would enter require a year for the design and contracts to be finalised, with construction taking place between late 2017 and 2021.

In 2014 the scale of the wind farm was reduced to minimise effects on shipping (Warrenpoint-Heysham) and fishing (Nephrops prawn); the resultant development had an estimated generating capacity of 300-400MW.

In 2014 the developers abandoned the wind farm plans due to an unfavourable regulatorary process and insufficient development incentives.
