= Kiata Wind Farm =

Wind farm in Victoria, Australia

- Country: Australia
- Location: Kiata, Victoria
- Coordinates: 36.402°S 141.752°E
- Status: Operational
- Construction began: March 2017
- Commission date: January 2018
- Construction cost: $75,000,000
- Owners: Windlab and John Laing Group
- Operator: Windlab

Wind farm
- Type: Onshore
- Hub height: 117 m (384 ft)
- Rotor diameter: 126 m (413 ft)
- Rated wind speed: 57 km/h (15.8 m/s)
- Site elevation: 400 m (1,312 ft)

Power generation
- Units operational: 9
- Make and model: Vestas V126
- Nameplate capacity: 31.5 MW
- Capacity factor: 45.9% (average 2018-2020)
- Annual net output: 126.7 GWh (average 2018-2020)

External links
- Website: www.kiatawindfarm.com.au

Kiata Wind Farm is a small wind farm located along the Western Highway south east of Nhill. The wind farm is owned by Windlab, the John Laing Group and some local shareholders. The turbines were built by Keppel Prince and assembled at the site by Windlab. It was "officially opened" by Lily D'Ambrosio on Australia Day 2018. According to Kiata Wind Farm director Rob Fisher, the Kiata turbines "are the biggest turbines operating in Australia to date." The ABC reported that some of the local landholders would become part owners "via a community investment model."

== Operations ==
The wind farm began grid commissioning in November 2017 and was fully commissioned in December 2017 and has operated continuously since then. The generation table uses eljmkt nemlog to obtain generation values for each month. The URL must be formatted as: "http://nemlog.com.au/show/unit/YYYYMMDD/YYYYMMDD/?k1=GENCODE" Kiata's code is KIATAWF1, so that is used.

Kiata Wind Farm Generation (MWh)
| Year | Total | Jan | Feb | Mar | Apr | May | Jun | Jul | Aug | Sep | Oct | Nov | Dec |
|---|---|---|---|---|---|---|---|---|---|---|---|---|---|
| 2017 | 11,105 | N/A | N/A | N/A | N/A | N/A | N/A | N/A | N/A | N/A | N/A | 2,560* | 8,545* |
| 2018 | 130,943 | 9,169 | 9,788 | 11,831 | 7,925 | 11,121 | 8,869 | 13,740 | 15,109 | 11,351 | 12,239 | 10,216 | 9,585 |
| 2019 | 126,101 | 9,249 | 9,262 | 9,485 | 9,134 | 11,148 | 10,047 | 12,132 | 11,385 | 9,938 | 10,526 | 12,754 | 11,041 |
| 2020 | 122,993 | 10,105 | 9,409 | 12,254 | 9,982 | 9,880 | 9,197 | 8,977 | 11,520 | 11,958 | 10,426 | 9,806* | 9,479* |
| 2021 | | 9,758* | 8,093* | 7,499* | 5,460* | 11,110* | | | | | | | |

Note: Asterisk indicates power output was limited during the month.

== See also ==
- List of wind farms in Victoria
- Wind power in Australia
