= North Blyth Biomass Project =

- Promotional rendering of the planned station
- Country: England
- Location: North Blyth, Northumberland
- Coordinates: 55°8′17″N 1°30′55″W
- Status: Cancelled

Thermal power station
- Primary fuel: Biomass

Power generation
- Nameplate capacity: 100 MW planned

External links
- Website: www.northblythproject.co.uk

The North Blyth Biomass Project was a proposed biomass-fired power station planned to be located at North Blyth, Northumberland on the north bank of the River Blyth near its tidal estuary. When commissioned it would have had a generating capacity of 100 megawatts, enough electricity to provide for 170,000 homes. Renewable Energy Systems, the station's developer, was granted government consent on 24 July 2013 to build the £250m project.

Although the Secretary of State granted a Development Consent Order as a nationally significant infrastructure project, the project was cancelled on 6 March 2014.

== Development ==
In September 2008, the Port of Blyth authority announced that it was planning to build a biomass power station on the redundant Bates Colliery site to the north of Blyth. In May 2009, Port of Blyth selected renewable energy company Renewable Energy Systems (RES) as the developer for the power station.

In December 2009, RES and the Port of Blyth decided to relocate the proposed station site to the north bank of the estuary at North Blyth near the port's new bulk materials handling facility. The reason given for the move was that it would reduce the number of road movements supplying the station, and would give the station access to rail facilities.

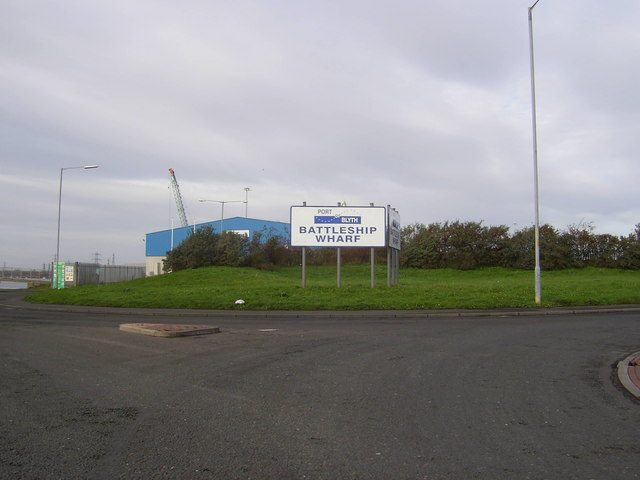
Proposed site of North Blyth Biomass power station

On 10 and 11 September 2010, RES released the first promotional images of what the station may look like, revealing them to the public in a series of public exhibitions at Blyth Community Enterprise Centre, the North Blyth Club and Cambois Welfare Institute. Later that month, RES claimed that 75% of the local residents who had attended the exhibitions had been enthusiastic about the station being built. Only 5% had opposed the scheme and 20% had no opinion. The strong support for the station was attributed to the creation of local employment at the station, the regeneration of the area and the contribution to the renewable energy drive in the area. David Maunder of RES said the company were "delighted with the positive response".

RES chose to build the station in Blyth because of the good workforce in the area and the town's good infrastructure. If built, the station would have contributed to Blyth becoming a centre for renewable energy, with the nearby NaREC. Between 200 and 300 full-time jobs were expected to be created at the peak of the construction of the station, and 40 permanent jobs would have been created once it was operational. It was claimed 95% of these jobs would go to local people. Planning permission for the station was expected to be submitted to the Infrastructure Planning Commission some time between January and March 2011, but that March the date was moved back to that summer. The build time for the station was expected to be around 30 months.

== Proposed specification ==
Once fully operational, the station would have generated 100 megawatts (MW) of electricity. This would equate to over 750 million kilowatt hours (kWh) of electricity a year, enough to power 170,000 average British homes. Through burning a mixture of biomass fuels. In a year the station would burn between 500,000 and 900,000 tonnes of woodchips, wood pellets, wood briquettes and recycled chipped wood. This fuel would be delivered to the station via the nearby port. The electricity generated would have been enough to cut carbon dioxide emissions by over 300,000 tonnes per year.

== Cancellation ==
The cancellation of the project was announced on 6 March 2014 and RES withdrew.
