= WestWind Energy =

WestWind Energy Pty Ltd
- Industry: Wind farm development
- Founded: 2004; 22 years ago
- Headquarters: Gisborne, Victoria, Australia
- Website: w-wind.com.au

WestWind Energy is an Australian company involved in development and operation of wind farms. Its origins were in Germany in the renewable energy sector. It is part of the WestWind Group of companies which has its headquarters in Kirchdorf, Lower Saxony, Germany.

WestWind Energy has been involved in several projects in the state of Victoria. It did the early development planning for the Mount Mercer Wind Farm, approx. 30km south of Ballarat before selling the project to Meridian Energy prior construction. It also did the development and planning for the Lal Lal Wind Farm, a two-site wind farm situated near Yendon (approx. 17km east of Ballarat) and Elaine (approx. 25km south-east of Ballarat) before selling the project to Macquarie Capital. It also did the planning and development for Moorabool Wind Farm before selling that project to Goldwind Australia for development.

In 2019, West Wind gained planning approval for the Golden Plains Wind Farm in western Victoria which could become Australia's largest wind farm.

WestWind is also early in the development process for a wind farm near Warracknabeal which would contain up to 219 turbines if built, as well as several other projects.

== See also ==
- Wind power in Australia
- List of renewable energy companies by country
