= Codrington Wind Farm =

Australian wind farm

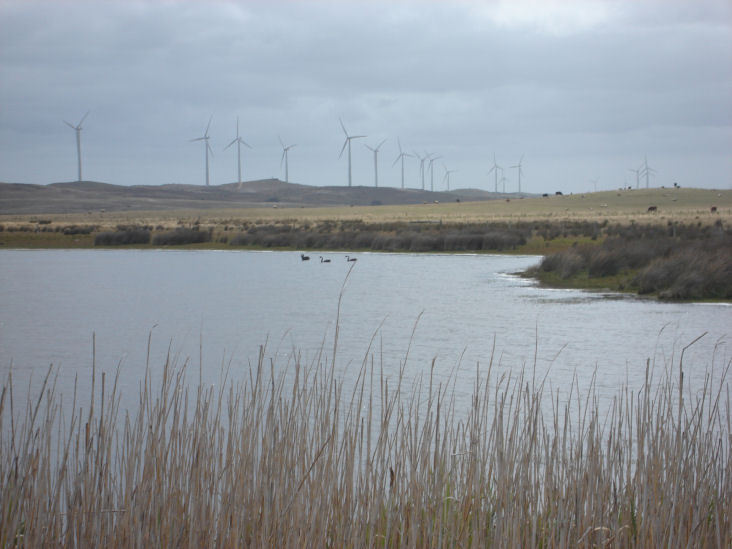
- Codrington Wind Farm
- Country: Australia
- Location: Port Fairy, Victoria
- Coordinates: 38.28°S 141.96°E
- Status: Operational
- Commission date: July 2001
- Construction cost: $33 million
- Owner: Pacific Blue

Wind farm
- Type: Onshore
- Site usage: Farming Land
- Hub height: 60 m (197 ft)
- Rotor diameter: 52 m (171 ft)

Power generation
- Units operational: 14
- Make and model: AN Bonus: B62/1300
- Nameplate capacity: 18.2 MW
- Annual net output: 51 GWh

External links
- Website: www.pacificblue.com.au/our-energy-production/operating-sites/codrington-wind-farm

Codrington Wind Farm is a wind farm near Yambuk on the coast of south-western Victoria, Australia. Completed in June 2001, the 18.2MW installation of 14 wind turbines generates 51 GWh annually, for a capital cost of A$30 million by Pacific Blue being the first fully private investment in a wind farm in Australia. When opened it was Australia's largest wind farm and the first in Victoria.

In February 2025 Pacific Blue announced that the Codrington Wind Farm is expected to shut operations by 2027 before being decommissioned.

The Yambuk wind farm (part of the Portland Wind Farm project) is directly adjacent to the Codrington Wind Farm. It has a total of 30MW in its 20 turbines.

== See also ==
- Portland Wind Farm
- Wind power in Australia
