= Macarthur Wind Farm =

Wind farm in Victoria, Australia

- Country: Australia
- Location: Victoria
- Coordinates: 38.049005°S 142.1905876°E
- Status: Operational
- Commission date: January 2013
- Construction cost: A$1b
- Owner: Morrison & Co / Malakoff
- Operator: AGL Energy

Wind farm
- Type: Onshore
- Hub height: 85 metres
- Rotor diameter: 112 metres
- Site elevation: 165 metres

Power generation
- Units operational: 140
- Make and model: Vestas V112-3.0MW
- Units planned: 140 × 3 MW
- Nameplate capacity: 420 MW
- Capacity factor: 24.50% (average 2013-2023)
- Annual net output: 901.2 GWh (average 2013-2023)

External links
- Website: www.agl.com.au/about-agl/how-we-source-energy/renewable-energy/macarthur-wind-farm

The Macarthur Wind Farm is a wind farm located in Macarthur, Victoria, Australia, near Hamilton, 260 km west of Melbourne. It is on a 5,500 ha site which has an installed capacity of 420 megawatts (MW). Based on a capacity factor of around 35%, it is estimated that the long-term average generation will be approximately 1,250 GWh per year. Its actual capacity factor is much lower, with a historical average of 24.50% since 2013. The wind farm comprises 140 Vestas V112-3.0MW wind turbines manufactured in Denmark.

The project cost about A$1 billion and was fully operational in January 2013. It was constructed by Vestas and Leighton Contractors. The first turbines were connected to the grid in September 2012. AGL Energy also invested an additional $27m in the substation, which is completely owned by the company.

== History ==
The project was proposed in 2004 and approved by the Government of Victoria in October 2006.

The project was developed by a joint venture formed by AGL Energy and Meridian Energy, a New Zealand-based power generating company, with works starting in 2010. The project was fully operational in January 2013.

In 2013, Meridian sold its 50% share in the wind farm to Malaysian power company Malakoff Corporation Berhad for A$650 million. In September 2015, AGL Energy sold its 50% stake in the wind farm to Morrison & Co for $532m.

AGL Energy will operate and maintain the wind farm in place of Morrison & Co and Malakoff. It also reserves the rights to all renewable energy certificates and electricity production until 2038.

== Operations ==
The wind farm registered its first grid output in September 2012 and reached full output in March 2013. The generation table uses eljmkt nemlog to obtain generation values for each month.

Macarthur Wind Farm Generation (MWh)
Year	Total	Jan	Feb	Mar	Apr	May	Jun	Jul	Aug	Sep	Oct	Nov	Dec
2012	130,077	N/A	N/A	N/A	N/A	N/A	N/A	N/A	N/A	26*	16,862*	36,463*	76,726*
2013	1,081,695	64,870*	71,095*	89,292*	65,862	94,835	69,212	110,056	161,313	116,783	123,371	59,772	55,234
2014	921,516	88,586	64,894	57,826	67,697	56,297	91,760	128,794	59,464	84,296	84,224	68,951	68,727
2015	999,626	97,213	61,516	74,953	57,059	122,926	74,144	116,023	94,537	69,370	84,615	67,932	79,338
2016	1,020,744	73,619	52,313	53,025	69,527	134,943	92,693	135,718	102,208	69,759	91,122	78,019	67,798
2017	888,669	58,217	62,226	70,416	36,579	58,751	42,026	126,122	103,920	135,307	74,841	56,721	63,543
2018	1,069,469	62,680	73,665	88,828	57,723	105,689	86,562	161,645	132,595	91,421	81,484	65,725	61,452
2019	977,014	49,132	70,374	67,309	70,299	96,318	91,265	106,790	114,631	82,854	72,786	78,356	76,900
2020	779,604	73,238	14,531	79,991	70,096	95,739	66,404	60,178	78,541	25,518	80,581	66,617	68,170
2021	803,007	69,269	44,864	39,846	56,501	38,375	71,864	119,446	98,291	88,988	69,269	58,189	48,105
2022	588,086	63,891	57,449	54,690	14,087	40,472	81,791	39,000	47,056	52,200	59,521	28,479	49,450
2023	784,107	53,158	48,769	48,302	34,018	74,796	111,592	115,381	47,077	75,745	77,327	42,918	55,024

Note: Asterisk indicates power output was limited during the month.

== Performance ==
Macarthur has consistently been one of the worst performing wind farms since its construction in 2012. It was intended to have a capacity factor around 34% and generate 1240 GWh of energy per annum.

However, the most the farm has generated was 1081 GWh in 2013, and has consistently averaged around 901 GWh, which corresponds to a capacity factor of 24.50%.

== See also ==
- List of wind farms in Victoria
- Wind power in Australia
