= Waubra Wind Farm =

Wind farm in Australia

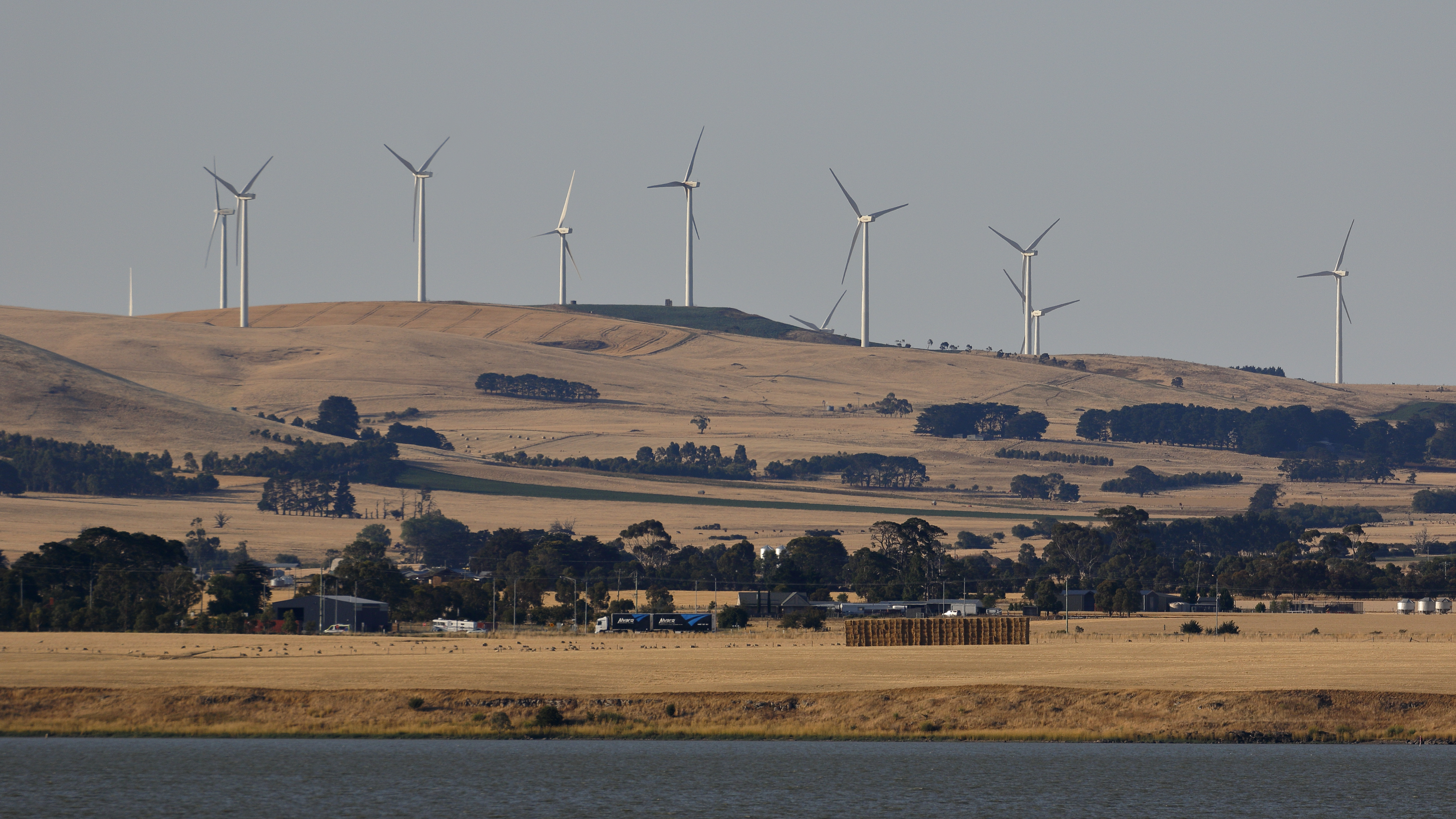
- Waubra Wind Farm in 2020
- Country: Australia
- Location: Waubra, Victoria
- Coordinates: 37.347917°S 143.600208°E
- Status: Completed
- Construction began: December 2007
- Commission date: July 2009
- Construction cost: A$450m
- Owner: Acciona Australia
- Operator: Acciona Australia

Wind farm
- Type: Onshore
- Hub height: 80 metres (262 ft)
- Rotor diameter: 77 metres (253 ft)
- Site area: 173 square kilometres (17,300 ha)

Power generation
- Units operational: 128 × 1.5 MW
- Make and model: Acciona AW-77/1500
- Nameplate capacity: 192 MW
- Capacity factor: 37.5% (projected)
- Annual net output: 630 GWh (projected)

External links
- Website: www.acciona.com.au/projects/energy/wind-power/waubra-wind-farm/
- Commons: Related media on Commons

The Waubra wind farm is located on both sides of the Sunraysia Highway 35 km north-west of Ballarat in Victoria, Australia. Upon its completion in July 2009, it was the largest wind farm in Australia and was the largest wind farm by number of turbines and total capacity in the southern hemisphere.

Consisting of 128 wind turbines, with associated substations and an operations centre, each wind turbine has a capacity of 1.5 megawatts (MW). The total installed capacity is 192 MW. The turbines have a tip height of 119 metres, rotor diameter of 77 metres and a hub height of 80 metres. Annually the farm is projected to generate 630 GWh of energy over the life of the project, for an annual capacity factor of 37.5%.

The green energy generated by the wind farm each year provides electricity for 138,000 households enough to power a city 3-4 times the size of Ballarat.

Acciona Energy formed a Community Reference Group (CRG) for the construction phase of the Waubra wind farm, to provide a regular forum for community input to the project and to facilitate communication between members of the Waubra community and the wind farm project team. In 2010 the anti-wind farm lobby group the Waubra Foundation adopted the name of the nearby town.

The construction of the Waubra wind farm received financial assistance as part of the Victorian State government's Victorian Renewable Energy Target (VRET).

In July 2011 the Australian Broadcasting Corporation 4 Corners program explored health concerns connected with Australian wind farms in its Against the Wind report. The Waubra wind farm and the community living around it was featured in the report.

A viewing platform designed by Melbourne-based firm JOH Architects is accessible to tourists and located just off the Sunraysia Highway.

== Operations ==
The generation table uses eljmkt nemlog to obtain generation values for each month.

Waubra Wind Farm Generation (MWh)
Year	Total	Jan	Feb	Mar	Apr	May	Jun	Jul	Aug	Sep	Oct	Nov	Dec
2011	621,970	47,516	40,760	55,943	39,394	46,579	63,673	69,138	37,653	61,698	52,945	44,851	61,820
2012	661,894	70,705	46,604	57,089	35,204	53,773	55,093	51,242	73,212	56,441	53,840	48,515	60,176
2013	654,980	61,640	47,343	49,522	38,999	53,182	43,750	53,669	70,964	55,347	67,563	63,095	49,906
2014	615,260	65,029	53,295	38,908	48,443	41,629	57,079	65,049	41,226	47,213	53,965	55,453	47,971
2015													
2016													
2017													
2018													
2019													
2020													
2021													

Note: Records date back to 2011.

== See also ==
- List of wind farms in Victoria
- Wind power
- Wind power in Australia
