= Portland Wind Farm =

Wind farm in Victoria, Australia

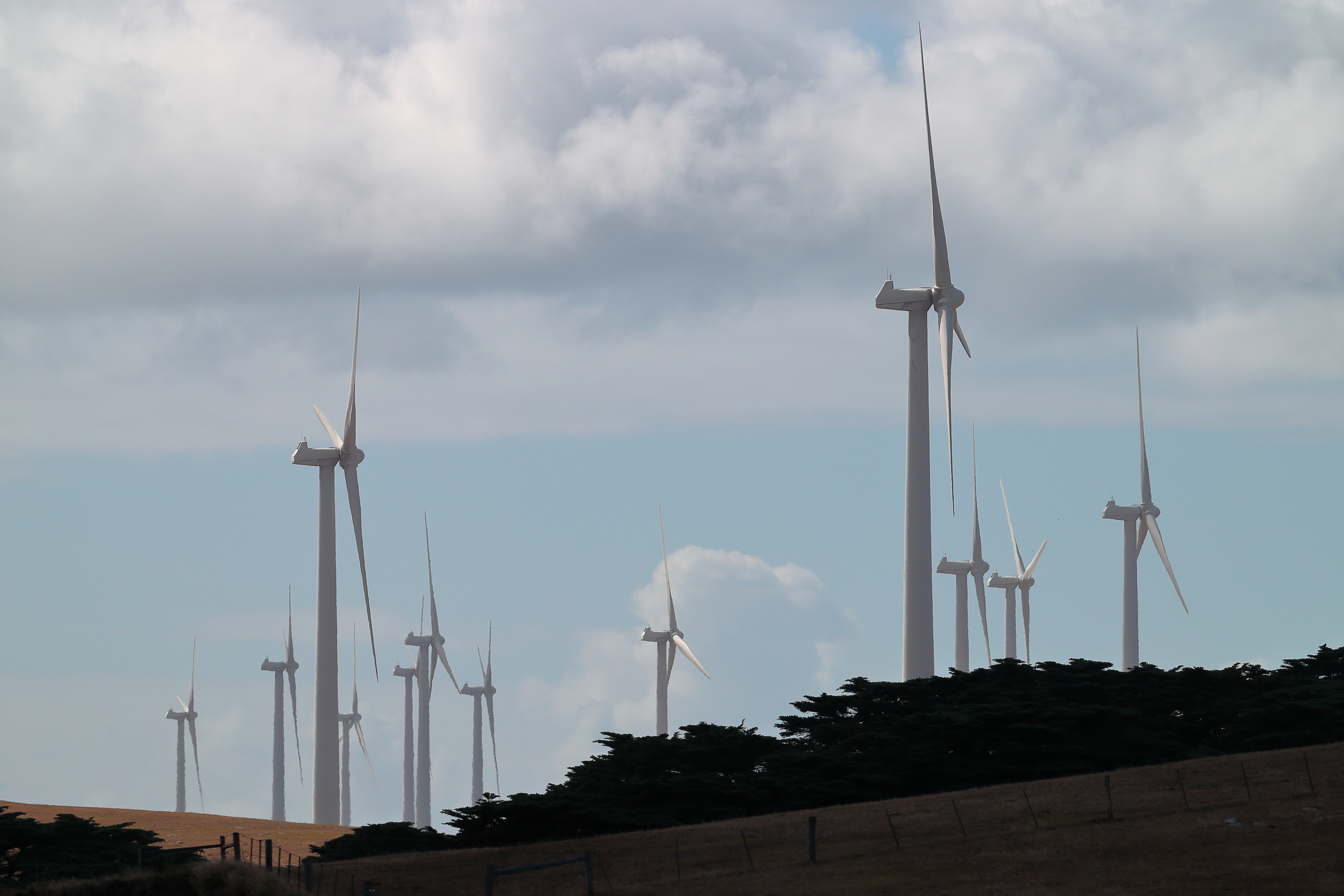
- Location of Portland Wind Farm in Victoria
- Country: Australia
- Location: Portland, Victoria
- Coordinates: 38°21′8.74″S 141°35′14.4″E
- Status: Operational
- Commission date: 2010
- Construction cost: A$330 million
- Owner: Pacific Blue

Power generation
- Units operational: 98
- Make and model: Vestas
- Nameplate capacity: 195 MW

External links
- Website: https://www.pacificblue.com.au

The Portland wind farm is one of Australia's largest wind farms. It is owned and operated by Pacific Blue and is located on the coast of south-western Victoria near the city of Portland, it consists of four separate sites, all of which have been completed as of 2015. Completion of the entire 195 MW project was expected in 2011, at a capital cost of A$330 million.

The project is expected to produce more than 500GWh annually, enough electricity to power about 125,000 homes each year, and equal to more than 7% of Victoria's residential electricity demand, or powering a city the size of Geelong. The project is being developed by Pacific Blue.

== History ==
The Danish turbine manufacturer, Vestas, constructed a blade manufacturing facility at nearby Portland in August 2005. Blades from the plant were intended to support the project. Blades were ultimately sourced from overseas however, and the plant was closed down in December 2007. Vestas cited too little investment support from the Federal government as the reason for the closure.

The planning minister approved the construction of wind towers on the Portland capes, including Cape Bridgewater, against the recommendations of the a Victorian Civil and Administrative Tribunal hearing and of a government appointed panel.

== Stages ==
1. Yambuk wind farm, the first stage of the project, consists of 20 turbines, each measuring 105 m (344 ft) tall, with a maximum rated output of 1.5 MW, totalling to a maximum capacity of 30 MW. These were commissioned in January 2007. The wind farm is adjacent to the existing Codrington Wind Farm, and is expected to produce more than 90GWh annually at a capital cost of about 50 million Australian dollars.
2. Cape Bridgewater wind farm of 58 MW, comprises 29, 2 MW generators. At completion in 2008 it was the largest wind farm in Victoria.
3. Cape Nelson South wind farm of 44 MW, comprises 22, 2 MW generators. It was completed in 2009.
4. Cape Sir William Grant wind farm (PWEP IV) of 47 MW, comprises 23, 2.05 MW generators. It was completed in 2015.

== Gallery ==
Yambuk wind farm

== See also ==
- List of power stations in Australia
- Wind power in Australia
