= Waubra Foundation =

Australian lobbying group

The Waubra Foundation was an Australian lobby that opposed wind farms and promoted the controversial wind turbine syndrome. The foundation was founded by Peter Mitchell, a director of several oil and gas companies. The foundation described itself as an advocacy group for properly conducted, multidisciplinary research into alleged health problems reported by people living in the vicinity of wind turbines and other industrial uses. The foundation was named after the town of Waubra, Victoria, Australia, but is not linked to it in any other way. The town is home to the 128 turbines at Waubra Wind Farm.

== Pseudoscientific claims ==
Claims made by the Waubra Foundation relating to wind turbine syndrome and wind farm syndrome are considered pseudoscientific and are not recognised as actual diseases by any international disease classification system, nor do they appear in any title or abstract in the United States National Library of Medicine's PubMed database. Wind turbine syndrome has been characterized as pseudoscience. Since 2003, 25 reviews have been published of the scientific literature on wind turbines and health. These studies have consistently found no reason to believe that wind turbines are harmful to health.

== History ==
The Foundation was originally known as the 'Waubra Disease Foundation' after claims that health problems reported by some residents of Waubra were caused by wind turbines. The Waubra Foundation has claimed that wind turbines have a mental and physical health impact on some people, largely as a result of infrasound. The Foundation claims the following symptoms are consistent with the impacts of wind turbine proximity: sleep disturbance, headache including migraines, tinnitus, ear pressure (often described as painful), balance problems / dizziness, vertigo, nausea, visual blurring, irritability, problems with concentration and memory, panic episodes, and tachycardia (fast heart rate). In 2009, the term Wind Turbine Syndrome was coined to encompass the broad range of symptoms described by complainants living near turbines. The foundation has published reports from sufferers of wind turbine syndrome symptoms living as far as 17 kilometres from the nearest turbine.

In November 2013, Senator Richard Di Natale, at that time health spokesperson for the Australian Greens, and former general practitioner, lodged a written complaint with both the Australian Charities and Not-for-profits Commission (ACNC) and the Australian Taxation Office, questioning the Waubra Foundation's qualification as a health promotion charity, on the basis that the foundation’s claims are false and misleading, and that they might actually be causing harm. On 11 December 2014, the ACNC revoked the foundation’s registration as a health promotion charity, with the Assistant Commissioner saying, "It is not possible for me to find that the Foundation's principal activity promotes the prevention or control of disease in human beings". In December 2017, the decision was affirmed after a failed appeal.

As of June 2024, the foundation appeared to be inactive.
