= Lal Lal Wind Farm =

Wind farm in Victoria, Australia

- Country: Australia
- Coordinates: 37°36′S 144°00′E
- Status: Operational
- Construction began: April 2018
- Commission date: 2019
- Owner: Macquarie Investment Management Australia Limited
- Operator: Renewable Energy Systems

Wind farm
- Type: Onshore
- Rotor diameter: 136 m (446 ft)

Power generation
- Units operational: 60 × 3.8 MW
- Make and model: Vestas V136-3.45 MW (60)
- Nameplate capacity: 228 MW

External links
- Website: www.lallalwindfarms.com.au

Lal Lal Wind Farm is an operating wind farm under southeast of Ballarat in Victoria, Australia. The wind farm has two sections about 9 kilometres (5.6 mi) apart. There are 38 turbines two kilometres east of Yendon and a further 22 turbines two kilometres north of Elaine.

The project was developed by WestWind Energy. The proposal was bought by Macquarie Capital in 2017, and financing was completed by onselling 40% to each of Northleaf Capital Partners and InfraRed Capital with Macquarie retaining the other 20%. Renewable Energy Systems is contracted to manage the build and first five years of operation. Construction is done by Zenviron and Vestas.

During the construction phase, one of the operating wind turbines was damaged on 15 September 2019 by a lightning strike during a storm. A direct hit resulted in one blade of a turbine being destroyed and falling to the ground. no other damage was reported.

During 2023 the project ownership changed to Igneo Infrastructure Partners (60%) and Northleaf Capital Partners (40%).

A 311 MW and 1,244 MWh grid battery started construction in 2025.
