= Murra Warra Wind Farm =

Wind farm in Victoria, Australia

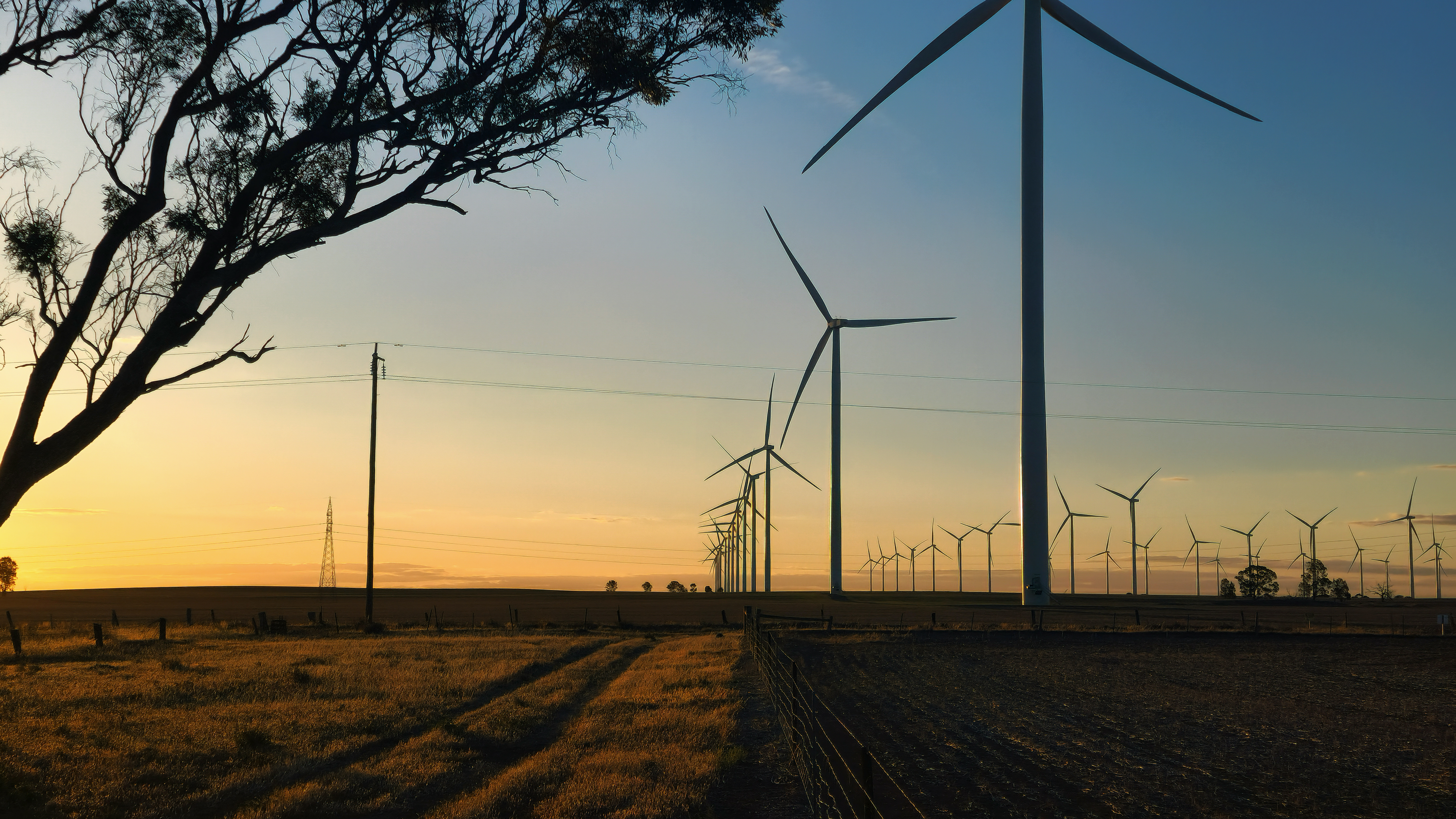
- Photograph of Murra Warra Wind Farm, 28 December 2024
- Country: Australia
- Location: Horsham, Victoria
- Coordinates: 36.431°S 142.321°E
- Status: Operational
- Construction began: March 2018
- Construction cost: A$760 million
- Owner: Partners Group

Wind farm
- Type: Onshore
- Hub height: Stage 1 139m & Stage 2 141m
- Rotor diameter: Stage 1 144m & Stage 2 158m
- Site area: 4,250 hectares (0 km^{2})

Power generation
- Units operational: Stage 1 61 & Stage 2 38
- Make and model: Stage 1 Senvion 3.7M144 & Stage 2 GE Cypress 5.5 - 158
- Units planned: 99
- Nameplate capacity: 434 MW

External links
- Website: www.murrawarrawindfarm.com

The Murra Warra Wind Farm is one of Australia's largest wind farms. Located on the plains of north-western Victoria, approximately 25 kilometres (16 mi) north of the city of Horsham, it consists of 99 wind turbines with a maximum tip height of 220m.

The project is expected to produce more than 1800 GWh annually, enough electricity to power about 420,000 average Victorian homes each year, displacing up to 1.7 million tonnes of greenhouse gas emissions each year. The project was developed by a joint venture between RES Group and Macquarie Capital and was sold in two stages to Partners Group in September 2018 and August 2020.

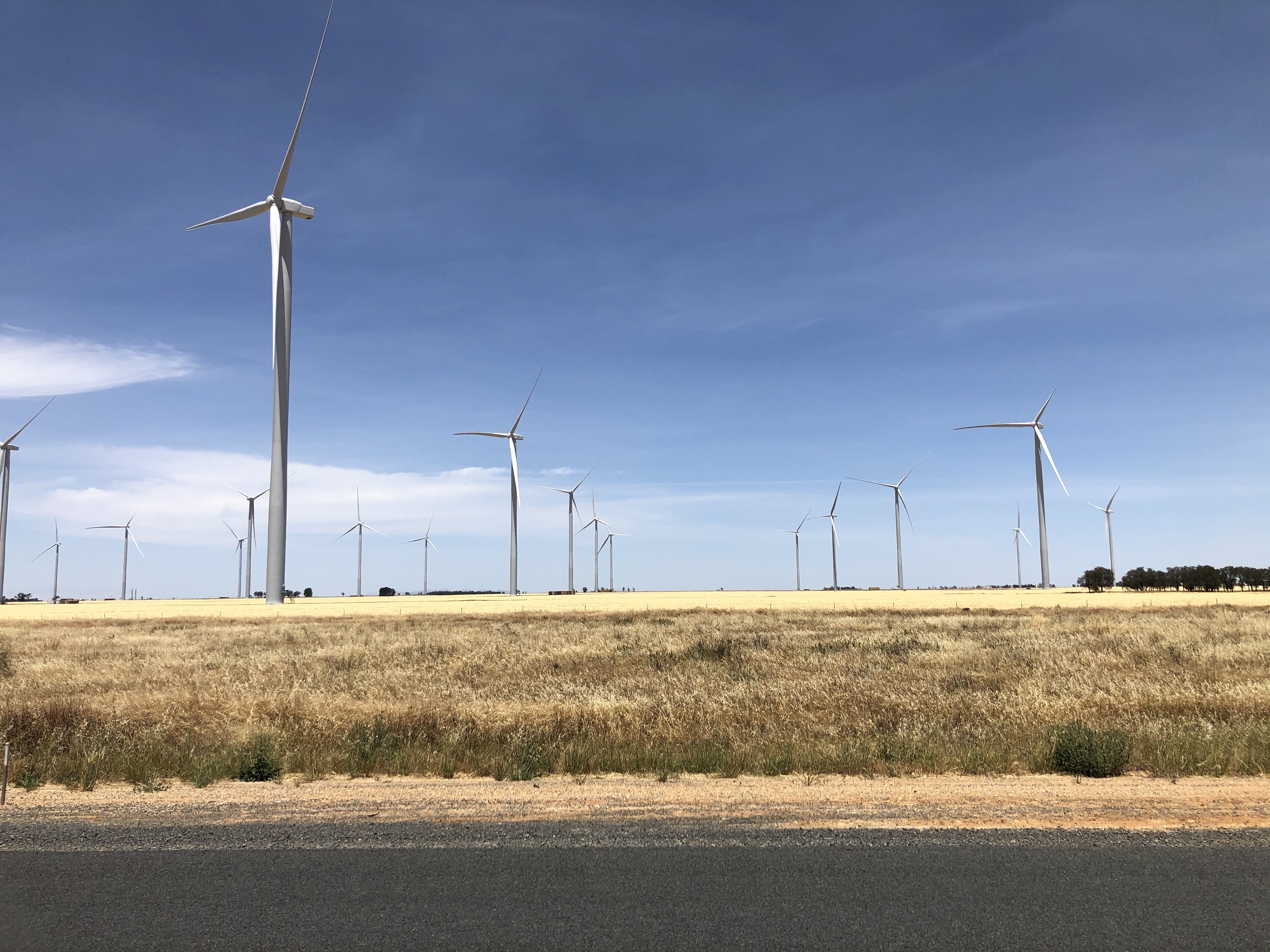
Photograph of Murra Warra Wind Farm, December 2019

== History ==
Site finding identified the location in 2007, and a meteorology mast erected in 2009. Development proceeded slowly until 2016, when planning reports were completed and submitted to DELWP in August 2016. Planning approval was given in November 2016 for 116 turbines.

A power purchase agreement was signed with a consortium of companies led by Telstra in December 2017, delivering Stage 1 of the project, which consists of 61 wind turbines. In March 2018, an EPC contract was signed with a consortium of Senvion and Downer Group to build a 61 turbines wind farm. In May 2019, it was reported that Downer Group market value had plunged by $430 million after its joint-venture partner on the Murra Warra wind farm project, Senvion had gone into administration. Stage 1 is expected to be completed during 2020. AusNet Services were contracted to build the Terminal Station which was completed in early 2019. The Project connects into the Victorian 220kV network between Horsham (HOTS) and Red Cliffs (RCTS).

Stage 1 of the project was acquired by Partners Group in September 2018. RES Group continued as Construction and Asset Managers. In May 2020 it was announced that Siemens Gamesa Renewable Energy (SGRE) had secured a 30 year contract to provide Operations and Maintenance Services.

Stage 2 of the project reached financial close in August 2020 when it was announced that Partners Group had also acquired the second stage with construction to commence immediately and scheduled to be completed by mid 2022. A power purchase agreement has been signed with Snowy Hydro for the output of the project. Stage 2 will be constructed under an EPC contract awarded to GE Renewable Energy who will supply 38 5.5MW Cypress turbines. Balance of plant will be provided by Zenviron. RES Group will continue as Construction and Asset Managers.

RES Group obtained permits in 2018 for a 120MW solar development with battery storage on adjoining land. No date for construction of this phase has been announced.

== Stages ==
- Stage 1, the first stage of the project, consists of 61 Senvion 3XM class turbines, each with a 139 m (456 ft) hub height, and 144 m (472 ft) turbine diameter, with a maximum rated output of 3.7 MW, totaling to a maximum capacity of 225.7 MW.
- Stage 2 Stage 2 will consist of 38 GE Cypress class turbines each with hub height of 141 m (463 ft) and rotor diameter of 158 m (518 ft) and a nameplate capacity of 5.5MW totaling a maximum capacity of 209MW.

== See also ==
- List of power stations in Australia
- Wind power in Australia
