= Ord River Hydro Power Station =

Coordinates: 16.12000°S 128.73817°E

The Ord River Hydro Power Station is a hydroelectric power station at Lake Argyle in Western Australia.

Ord River Hydro Power Station is a hydroelectric power station operated by Pacific Blue. It is located on the Ord River in Western Australia. It has four turbines, with a generating capacity of 30 megawatts (40,000 hp) of electricity.

The power station was opened on 10 May 1996 and began generating power in April 1997, with four 7.5 megawatts (10,100 hp) turbines. It supplies electricity to the nearby Argyle Diamond Mine, and the towns of Kununurra and Wyndham.
