= William Hovell Dam =

Dam in Victorian, Australia

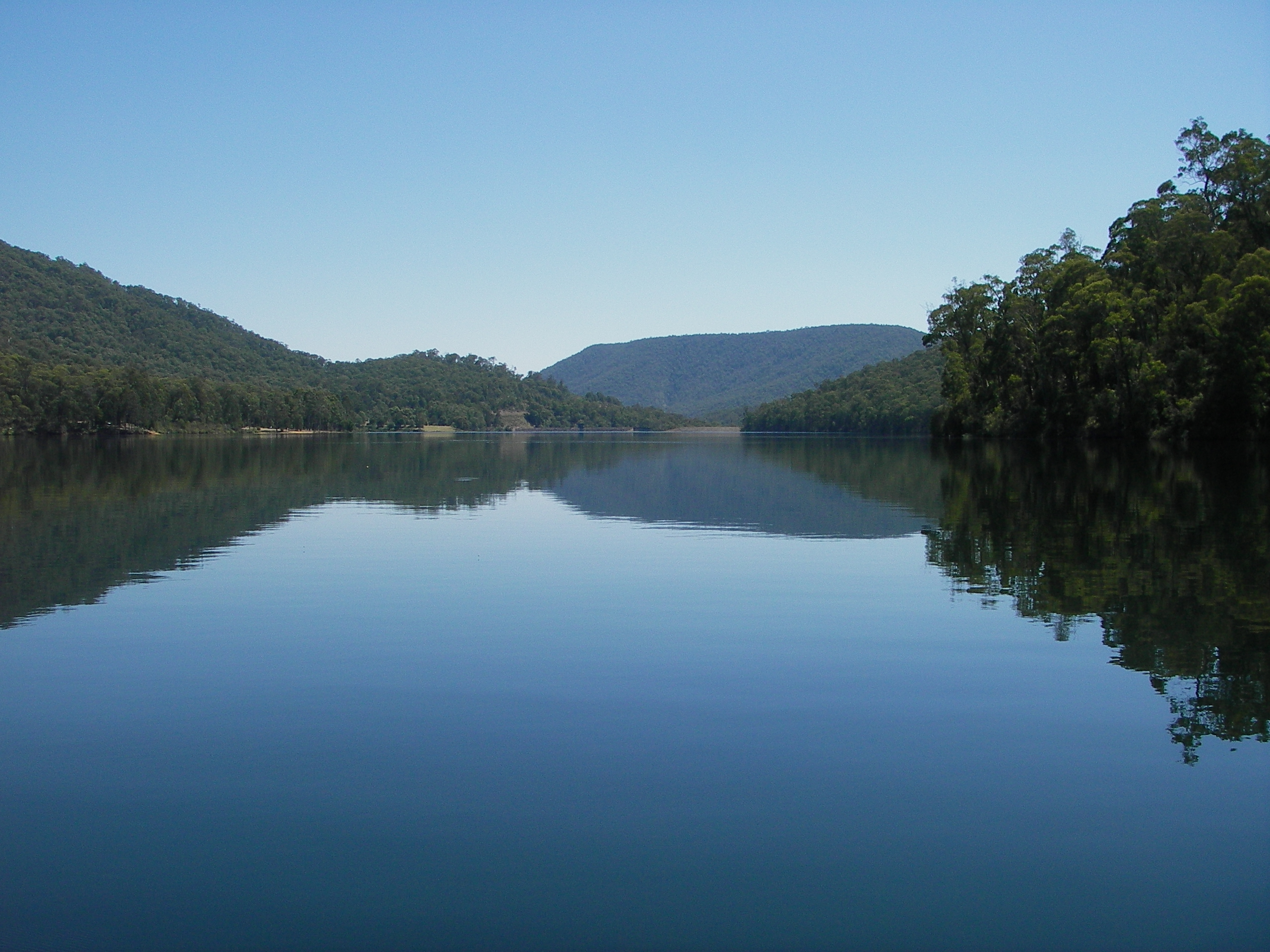
- Looking north towards dam wall, across the lake

- Location of the dam in Victoria
- Interactive map of William Hovell Dam
- Country: Australia
- Location: Hume, Victoria
- Coordinates: 36°55′14″S 146°23′25″E
- Purpose: Irrigation; Hydroelectricity
- Status: Operational
- Opening date: 1971
- Owner: Goulburn-Murray Water

Dam and spillways
- Type of dam: Embankment dam
- Impounds: King River
- Height: 35 m (115 ft)
- Length: 414 m (1,358 ft)
- Dam volume: 355×10^{3} m^{3} (12.5×10^{6} cu ft)
- Spillway type: Flip bucket chute spillway
- Spillway capacity: 2,195 m^{3}/s (77,500 cu ft/s)

Reservoir
- Creates: Lake William Hovell
- Total capacity: 13,500 ML (10,900 acre⋅ft)
- Catchment area: 331 km^{2} (128 sq mi)
- Surface area: 113 ha (280 acres)
- Normal elevation: 406 m (1,332 ft) AHD

William Hovell Power Station
- Operator: Pacific Hydro
- Commission date: 1973
- Type: Conventional
- Installed capacity: 1.6 MW (2,100 hp)
- Annual generation: 3.7 GWh (13 TJ)
- Website g-mwater.com.au

The William Hovell Dam is an embankment dam across the King River, located in the Hume region of Victoria, Australia. Completed in 1973, the resultant reservoir, Lake William Hovell, was established for the purposes of irrigation and the generation of hydroelectricity.

Named in honour of William Hovell, an explorer, the dam and reservoir are managed by Goulburn-Murray Water, and the power station is operated by Pacific Blue.

== Dam and reservoir overview ==
=== Dam ===
The dam is located south of Whitfield on the edge of the Alpine National Park, fed by the King River and Evans Creek. It supplies water for approximately 24 square kilometres (9.3 sq mi) for irrigated crops, vineyards and grazing properties along the King River from Cheshunt to Wangaratta.

Completed in 1971 the rock and earth-fill dam structure is 35 metres (115 ft) high and 414 metres (1,358 ft) long. When full, the reservoir has capacity of 13,500 megalitres (10,900 acre⋅ft), covers a surface area of 113 hectares (280 acres), and is drawn from a catchment area of 331 square kilometres (128 sq mi). The unusual flip bucket chute spillway has a discharge capacity of 2,195 cubic metres per second (77,500 cu ft/s).

=== Reservoir ===
Lake William Howell is stocked with wild brown trout, rainbow trout, redfin and Macquarie Perch. Fly fishing is permitted on the lake's shores and boats are permitted on the lake. Downstream of the dam wall, paddling and rafting is a common recreational pursuit. Limited picnic facilities are available.

== Hydroelectric power station ==
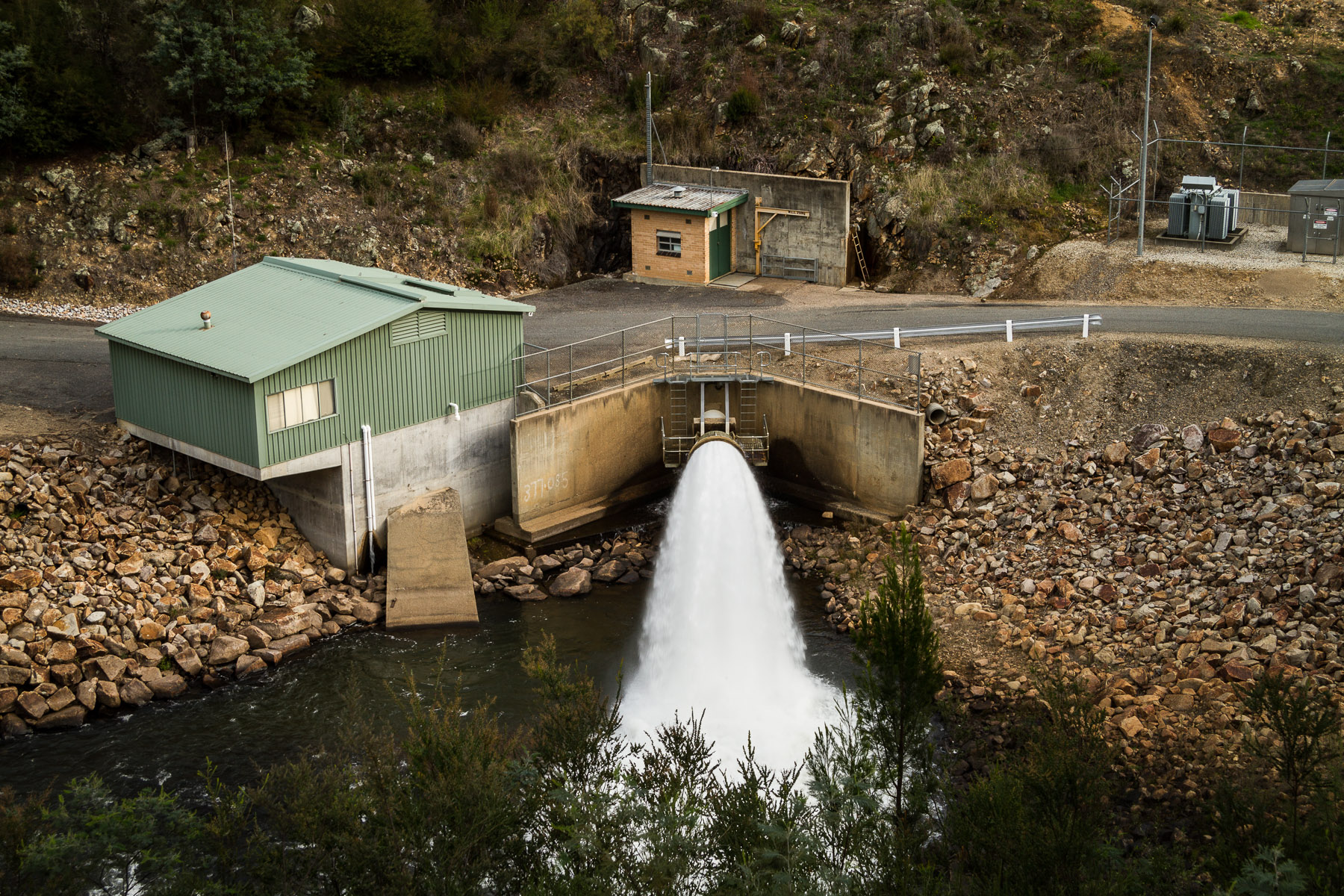
Release from the power station

Outflow from the dam drives a 1.6 megawatts (2,100 hp) conventional hydroelectric generator, with an average annual output of 3.7 gigawatt-hours (13 TJ), operated by Pacific Blue.

== See also ==
- List of power stations in Victoria
- List of reservoirs and dams in Victoria
