= Wonthaggi Wind Farm =

Wind farm in Victoria, Australia

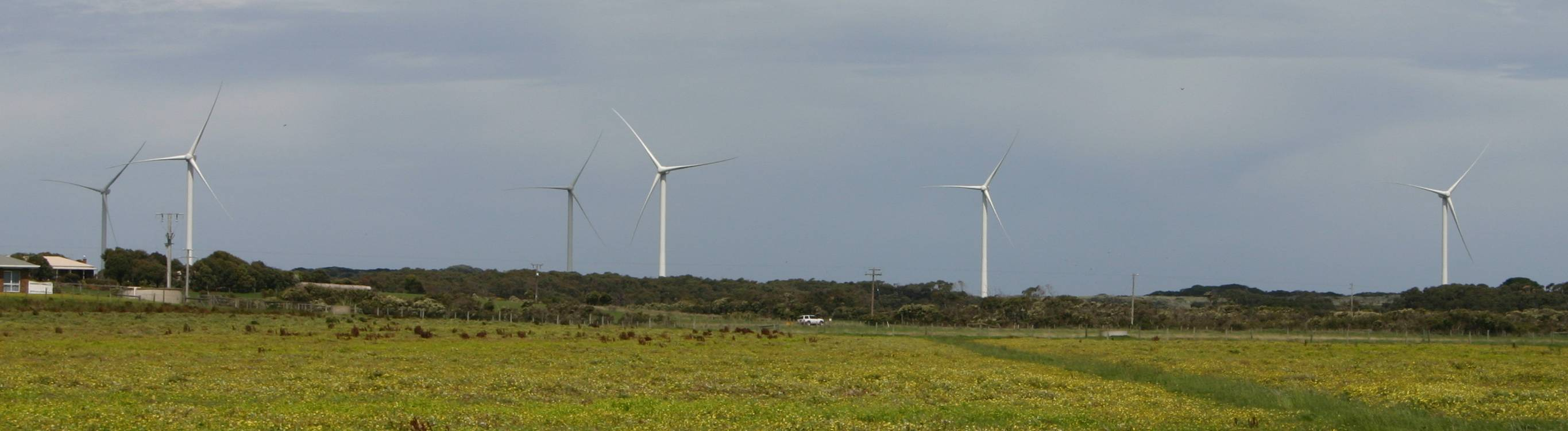
- Country: Australia
- Location: Victoria
- Coordinates: 38°36′11″S 145°32′26″E
- Commission date: December 2005
- Owner: EDL Energy- serviced by Vestas

Wind farm
- Distance from shore: 700–900m
- Hub height: 69m
- Rotor diameter: 82m
- Rated wind speed: 25m/s

Power generation
- Units operational: 6
- Make and model: REpower: MM82
- Nameplate capacity: 12 MW
- Annual net output: 30 gigawatt hours (GWh)

External links
- Website: edlenergy.com/project/wonthaggi/

Wonthaggi wind farm is a wind power station at Wonthaggi in Gippsland, Victoria, Australia. It has 6 wind turbines, with a total generating capacity of 12 MW of electricity.

== Technical Details ==
Each of the turbines is a German made Senvion (formerly REpower) MM82 turbines, with a rotor diameter of 82m, and each nacelle sitting on an Australian made 69m tall tower. The farm is operated by eDL Energy Australia, and became operational in December 2005.

== Blade Snapping Incident ==
In March 2012 one of the rotor blades snapped, Senvion (formerly REpower), the manufacturers of the turbine, replaced the blades. The fault was due to a manufacturing defect.

== See also ==
- Wind power in Australia
