= Wind turbine syndrome =

Pseudomedical diagnosis

Pseudomedical diagnosis
- Risks: Nocebo

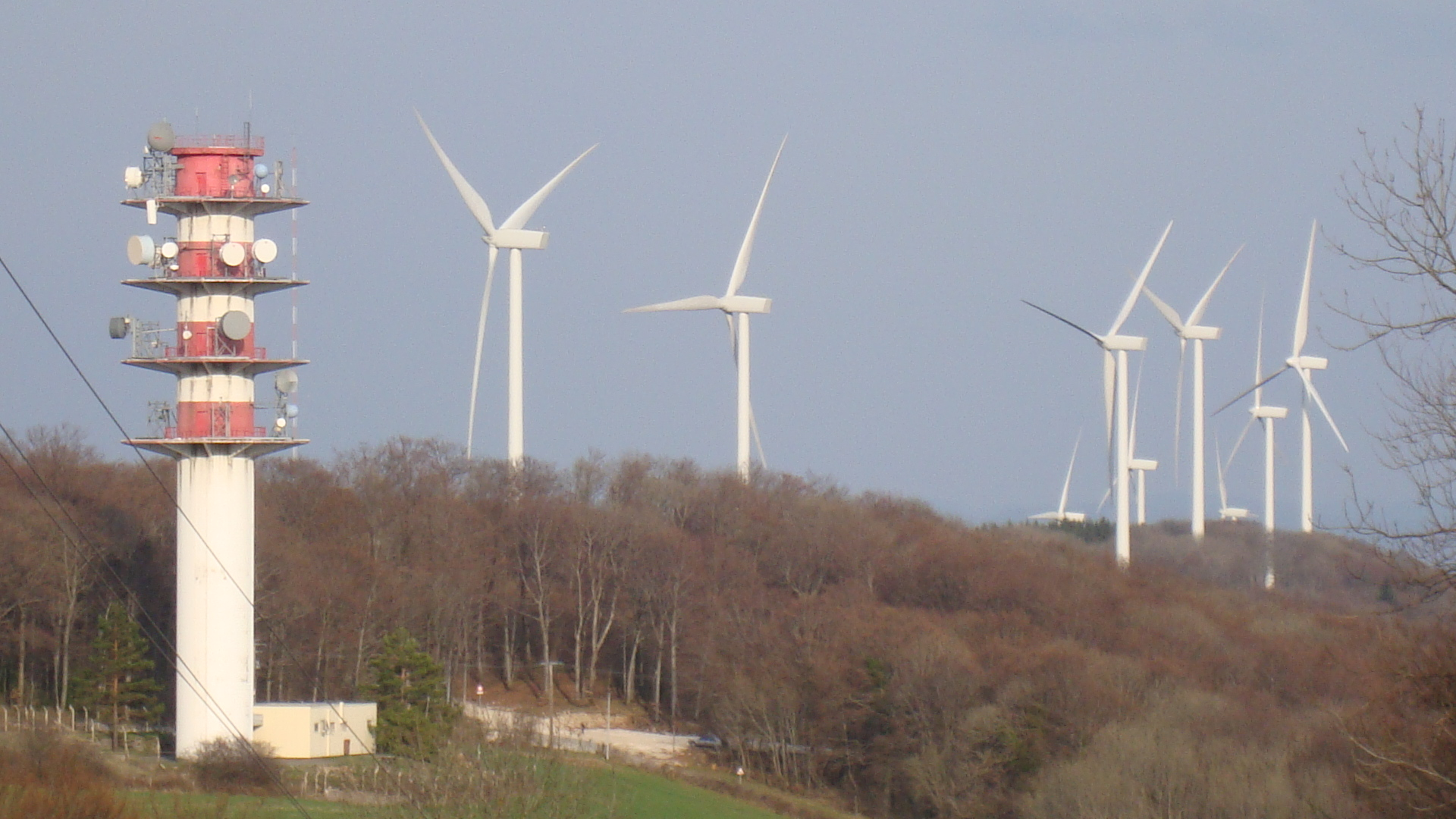
The wind farm in Lomont is at the limit of high Doubs specifically on the chain of Lomont through the Franche-Comte region from East to West

Wind turbine syndrome and wind farm syndrome are terms for the alleged medical condition related to the proximity of wind turbines. Proponents claim that these effects include congenital abnormality, cancer, vertigo, nausea, autism, ADHD, death, tinnitus, stress, fatigue, memory loss, migraines and sleep deprivation, for which there is no scientific backing. The distribution of recorded events, however, correlates with media coverage of wind farm syndrome itself, and not with the presence or absence of wind farms. Neither term is recognised by any international disease classification system, nor do they appear in any title or abstract in the United States National Library of Medicine's PubMed database. Wind turbine syndrome has been characterized as pseudoscience.

One Australian fossil fuel industry funded anti-wind farm astroturfing group, the Waubra Foundation, has been identified amongst those involved in promoting the idea of wind turbine syndrome. An investigation led to the foundation being stripped of its status as a health promotion charity.

== Safety reviews ==
Since 2003, 25 reviews have been published of the scientific literature on wind turbines and health. These studies have consistently found no reason to believe that wind turbines are harmful to health.

== Noise and annoyance ==
There is a belief that infrasound can cause symptoms, including tinnitus, stress, fatigue, memory loss, attention deficit, vertigo, migraines and sleep deprivation.

A panel of experts commissioned by the Massachusetts Department of Environmental Protection concluded in 2012 that "there is not an association between noise from wind turbines and measures of psychological distress or mental health problems."

A 2009 Canadian study found that "a small minority of those exposed report annoyance and stress associated with noise perception..." [however] "Annoyance is not a disease." The study group pointed out that similar irritations are produced by local and highway vehicles, as well as from industrial operations and aircraft.

A 2011 literature review found that although wind turbines are associated with some health effects, such as sleep disturbance, the health effects reported by those living near wind turbines were probably caused not by the turbines themselves but rather by "physical manifestation from an annoyed state." A 2013 report for the National Health and Medical Research Council (Australia) elaborated: "There is consistent evidence that noise from wind turbines is associated with annoyance, and reasonable consistency that it is associated with sleep disturbance and poorer sleep quality and quality of life. However, it is unclear whether the observed associations are due to wind turbine noise or plausible confounders."

A meta study published in 2014 reported that among the cross-sectional studies of better quality, no clear or consistent association is seen between wind turbine noise and any reported disease or other indicator of harm to human health. Noise from turbines played a minor role in comparison with other factors in leading people to report annoyance in the context of wind turbines.

== Policy impact ==
In Ontario, Canada, the Ministry of the Environment created noise guidelines to limit wind turbine noise levels 30 metres away from a dwelling or campsite to 40 dB(A). These regulations also set a minimum distance of 550 metres (1,800 ft) for a group of up to five relatively quiet [102 dB(A)] turbines within a 3-kilometre (1.9 mi) radius, rising to 1,500 metres (4,900 ft) for a group of 11 to 25 noisier (106–107 dB(A)) turbines. Larger facilities and noisier turbines would require a noise study.

In a 2009 report about rural wind farms, a Standing Committee of the Parliament of New South Wales, Australia, recommended a minimum setback of two kilometres between wind turbines and neighbouring houses (which can be waived by the affected neighbour) as a precautionary approach.

Despite the lack of scientific literature demonstrating any health effects from wind turbines, Australia's Turnbull government appointed a wind farm commissioner in October 2015 to address complaints. The 2016 annual report of the Independent Scientific Committee on Wind Turbines was tabled in the Australian Parliament on 8 August 2017. A website is maintained for the National Wind Farm Commissioner, with information about the role's purpose and links to a variety of publications that address wind turbines and their management, from a range of national and international sources.

== Noise mitigation ==
Modern wind turbines produce significantly less noise than older designs. Turbine designers work to minimise noise, as noise reflects lost energy and output. Noise levels at nearby residences may be managed through the siting of turbines, the approvals process for wind farms, and operational management of the wind farm. There is still an unproven belief that infrasound can not be mitigated and can travel for miles around.

== French legal case ==
In 2021, a French court accepted the claims of a Belgian couple that they had suffered various health problems including headaches, insomnia, heart irregularities, depression, dizziness, tinnitus and nausea by noises "comparable to a washing machine continually turning" and the "white flashing lights" after six wind turbines set up 700 metres from their home at Fontrieu. They successfully sued Sasu, Margnes Energie and Sasu Singladou Energie for €110,000.
