= North Blyth, Northumberland =

Coordinates: 55.135°N 1.510°W

North Blyth
- Location within Northumberland
- OS grid reference: NZ314823
- Shire county: Northumberland
- Region: North East
- Country: England
- Sovereign state: United Kingdom
- Post town: BLYTH
- Postcode district: NE24
- Police: Northumbria
- Fire: Northumberland
- Ambulance: North East
- UK Parliament: Wansbeck

North Blyth is a small settlement in south-east Northumberland, England. It is located to the south east of the village of Cambois and to the north of the town of Blyth on the north eastern side of the River Blyth harbour.

It comprises three streets and a Working men's club. It has a railhead serving the Alcan Lynemouth Aluminium Smelter bauxite sea terminal as well as a rail terminal at the nearby Battleship Wharf, part of the Port of Blyth operating division of the Blyth Harbour Commission, an independent statutory trust established in 1882.

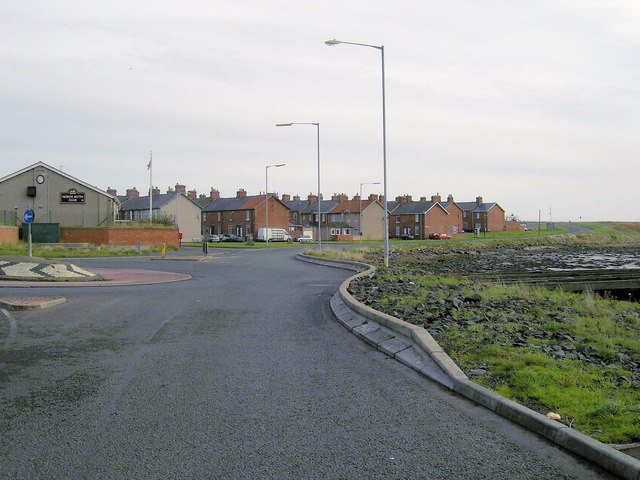
North Blyth settlement in November 2006

== Culture ==
Music

The Divine Comedy's song Neptune's Daughter (from their Promenade album) features field recordings made at the sea wall in North Blyth by producer Darren Allison.

Television

North Blyth has featured in various episodes of ITV crime drama series Vera

Film

The North Blyth peninsula was used as a location in the final scenes in the 1971 film Get Carter starring Michael Caine, and directed by Mike Hodges.
