= Mount Mercer Wind Farm =

Wind farm in Victoria, Australia

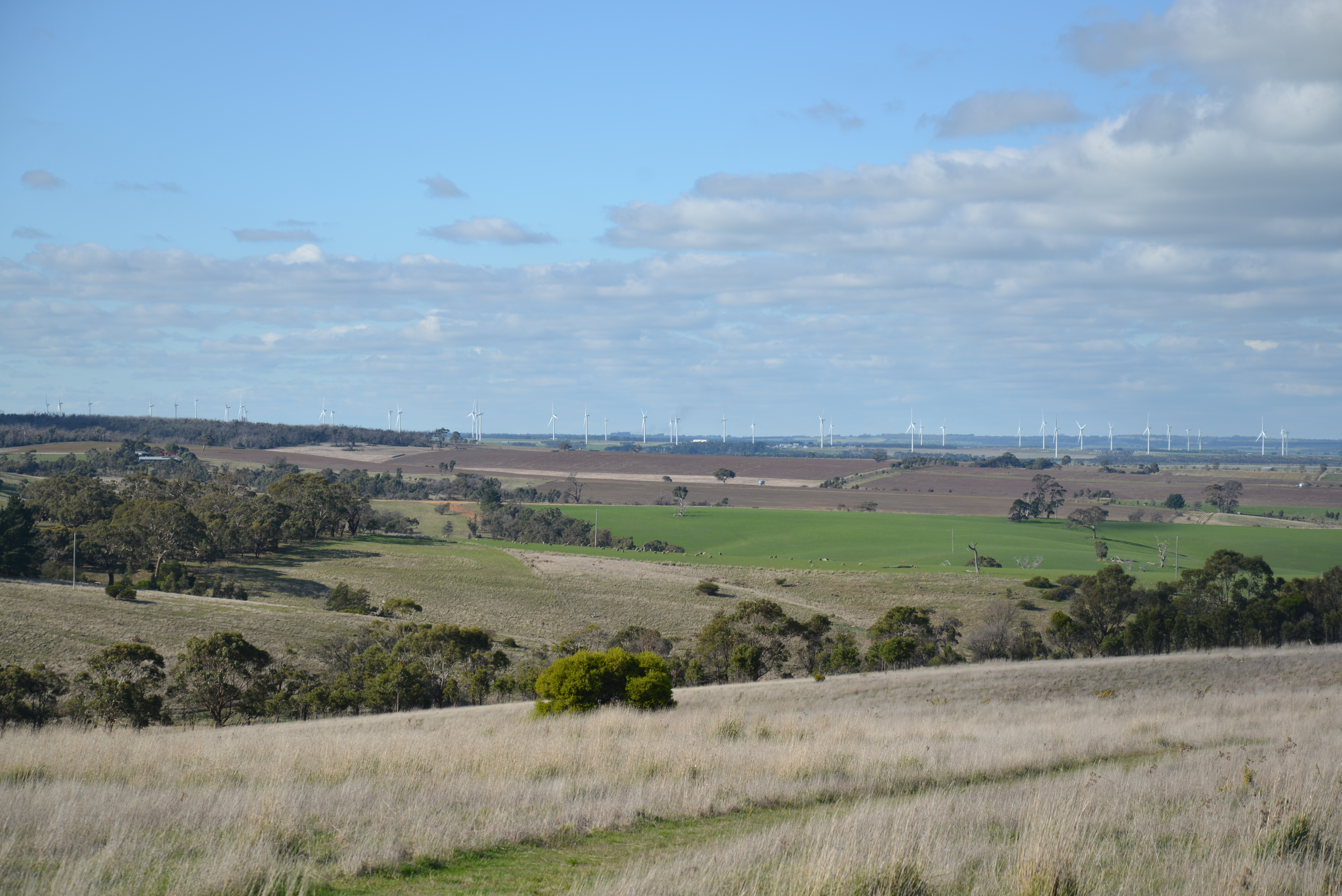
- Country: Australia
- Location: Victoria
- Coordinates: 37°50′28″S 143°52′16″E
- Status: Operational
- Commission date: November 2013
- Owner: Meridian Energy

Wind farm
- Hub height: 80M
- Rotor diameter: 90M

Power generation
- Units operational: 64
- Make and model: REpower: MM92
- Nameplate capacity: 131 MW

The Mount Mercer Wind Farm is located at Mount Mercer approximately 30 kilometres south of Ballarat in Western Victoria on 2600ha. The wind farm consists of 64 REpower MM92 wind turbines, giving a total installed capacity of 131 MW. It is expected to generate approximately 395,000 megawatt hours (MWh) of electricity each year which could power approximately 74,000 households and result in a reduction of some 510,000 tonnes of carbon dioxide.

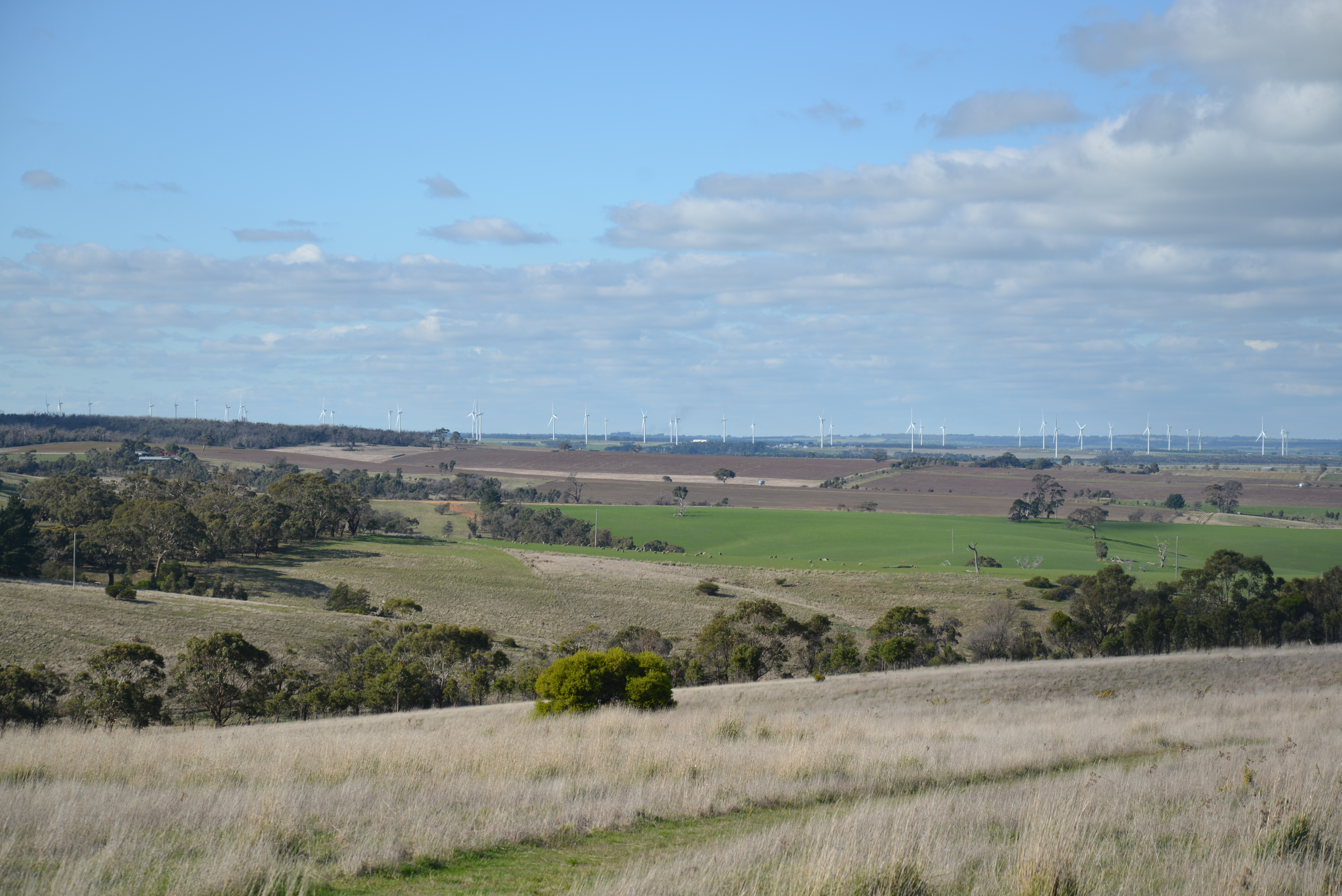
Mount Mercer wind farm viewed from Colac Ballarat Road

Construction was to commence in September 2009 under the management of WestWind Energy, however the project changed hands to Meridian Energy in the middle of 2009 and construction was delayed several years with Meridian Energy due to the 2008 financial crisis. Further delays were caused by having to re-design the backhaul to the national grid and thus having to renegotiate easement agreements with local land owners. Construction began December 2012 and the generation came fully online in September 2014.

Local farmers who would have turbines on their land were offered $7000 per turbine per year.

First electricity was generated from the wind farm in November 2013.
