= Cherry Tree Wind Farm =

Wind farm in Australia

- Country: Australia
- Location: South of Seymour, Victoria
- Coordinates: 37.10°S 145.26°E
- Status: Operational
- Construction began: January 2019
- Commission date: June 2020
- Owner: John Laing Group
- Operator: Vestas

Wind farm
- Type: Onshore
- Hub height: 91 m (299 ft)
- Rotor diameter: 136 m (446 ft)
- Rated wind speed: 13 m/s (43 ft/s)

Power generation
- Units operational: 16 × 3.6 MW
- Make and model: Vestas V136
- Nameplate capacity: 57.6 MW
- Capacity factor: 38.41% (2020-2021)
- Annual net output: 193.8 GWh (2020-2021)

Cherry Tree Wind Farm is a small wind farm located approximately 15 km south-east of Seymour, Victoria. The 16 turbine, 57.6 MW farm was developed and constructed by Infigen Energy for John Laing Group. Construction started in January 2019 and was operational in June 2020. The wind farm is expected to generate 182 GWh on average annually, for a capacity factor of 36%.

== Operations ==
The wind farm began grid commissioning in May 2020 and was fully commissioned in June 2020 and has operated continuously since then. The generation table uses eljmkt nemlog to obtain generation values for each month.

Cherry Tree Wind Farm Generation (MWh)
Year	Total	Jan	Feb	Mar	Apr	May	Jun	Jul	Aug	Sep	Oct	Nov	Dec
2020	121,881	N/A	N/A	N/A	N/A	9,082*	8,396*	15,778	16,703	18,441	18,139	17,074	18,268
2021		18,526	16,223	15,450	10,556	14,463	14,179	15,350	12,655	12,777			

Note: Asterisk indicates power output was limited during the month.
