= Ararat Wind Farm =

Australian wind farm

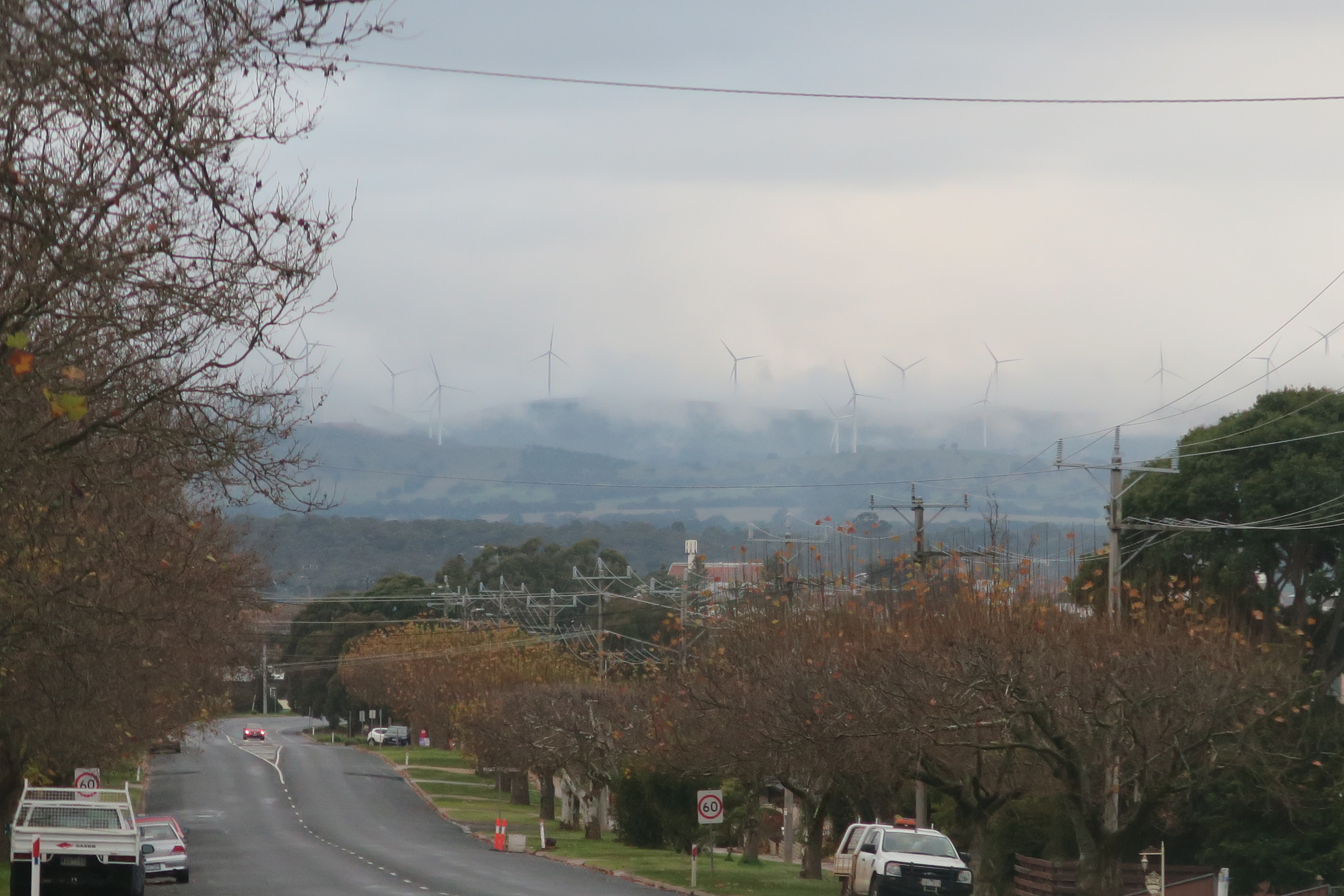
- Ararat Wind Farm in 2017
- Country: Australia
- Location: 9-17km northeast of Ararat, Victoria
- Coordinates: 37.24°S 142.98°E
- Status: Operational
- Construction began: August 2015
- Commission date: April 2017
- Construction cost: A$450 million
- Owners: Partners Group, RES Australia, OPTrust, GE
- Operator: Windlab

Wind farm
- Type: Onshore
- Hub height: 85 metres (279 ft)
- Rotor diameter: 103 metres (338 ft)

Power generation
- Units operational: 75 × 3.2 MW
- Make and model: General Electric 3.2-103
- Nameplate capacity: 240 MW
- Capacity factor: 27.49% (average 2018-2021)
- Annual net output: 578.0 GWh (average 2018-2021)

External links
- Website: www.ararat-windfarm.com

Ararat Wind Farm is a wind farm in western Victoria, Australia. It is located approximately 180km northwest of Melbourne. It was officially opened on 27 June 2017 and was the third-largest wind farm in Australia at that time, with capacity to generate 240MW from 75 turbines.

The farm has General Electric turbines that have a rated capacity of 3.2 MW, a hub height of 85 metres, 103 metre rotor diameter, and a tip height of 135 metres.

Of the 75 turbines, 70 are in the Rural City of Ararat and five are in the Shire of Northern Grampians.

== Operations ==
The wind farm began grid output in August 2016 and reached full output in June 2017 and has operated continuously since then. The generation table uses eljmkt nemlog to obtain generation values for each month.

Ararat Wind Farm Generation (MWh)
Year	Total	Jan	Feb	Mar	Apr	May	Jun	Jul	Aug	Sep	Oct	Nov	Dec
2016	75,683	N/A	N/A	N/A	N/A	N/A	N/A	N/A	716*	8,266*	18,075*	22,087*	26,539*
2017	474,810	30,091*	36,563*	36,941*	34,929*	33,736*	16,404*	50,732	45,204	55,910	45,690	38,293	50,317
2018	592,510	53,655	46,062	56,475	30,700	54,112	38,952	63,663	56,214	44,039	53,829	48,864	45,945
2019	576,679	50,997	41,975	40,628	32,156	49,759	50,346	51,941	58,583	45,636	45,893	51,321	57,444
2020	589,419	53,954	46,572	62,532	39,658	55,387	37,301	37,466	50,866	56,740	52,194	42,836	53,913
2021	553,226	61,029	43,860	41,105	30,585	44,109	41,653	51,395	45,724	43,136	48,326	50,474	51,830

Note: Asterisk indicates power output was limited during the month.
