= Pacific Blue (company) =

- Industry: Electricity
- Founded: 1992
- Headquarters: Melbourne, Australia
- Area served: Australia
- Key people: Dominic Capomolla(CEO)
- Products: Electricity
- Services: Electricity retailing
- Parent: State Power Investment Corporation
- Subsidiaries: Pacific Blue Australia
- Website: www.pacificblue.com.au

Pacific Blue (formerly Pacific Hydro) is an electricity and natural gas generation and retailing company headquartered in Melbourne, Australia. The company was founded in 1992 and was soon floated on the Australian Securities Exchange. It was later bought by a consortium of industry superannuation funds and de-listed. It is now owned by China's State Power Investment Corporation.

The company builds and operates renewable energy projects. It initially was initially involved in hydro electricity on irrigation dams, before opening its first wind farm in 2010. Pacific Blue is now involved in hydro, wind, solar and geothermal power projects.

Pacific Blue is also active in the production and trading of carbon credits from its run-of-river hydro projects registered under the Clean Development Mechanism of the Kyoto Protocol.

The company is one of the pioneers of renewable energy development in Australia. Pacific Blue developed the first commercial wind farm in Victoria and, by 2023, operated a high-quality, diversified portfolio of wind, solar and hydro renewable assets in Australia, with a total generation capacity of over 660 MW and a significant pipeline of over 2 GW across the National Electricity Market (NEM).

In 2012, Pacific Blue's retail arm began operations under the brand name Tango Energy, selling electricity and natural gas to consumers in Victoria. In April 2023, Tango Energy Pty Ltd was renamed Pacific Blue Retail Pty Ltd, and provided energy products to customers under the Pacific Blue Retail and Tango Energy brands. Its certified carbon neutral products are available through its Pacific Blue Retail brand.

== Power stations ==
Power stations owned and operated by Pacific Blue include:

=== Wind ===
- Codrington Wind Farm
- Challicum Hills Wind Farm
- Clements Gap Wind Farm
- Crowlands Wind Farm
- Portland Wind Project
- Taralga Wind Farm

=== Water ===
- Eildon Pondage Power Station
- Lake Glenmaggie power station
- Ord River Hydro Power Station
- The Drop Hydro
- William Hovell Power Station, a hydro–electric power station in the Hume region of Victoria, Australia

=== Solar ===
- Haughton Solar Farm
