= Renewable Energy Systems =

Global renewable energy company

Renewable Energy Systems Limited
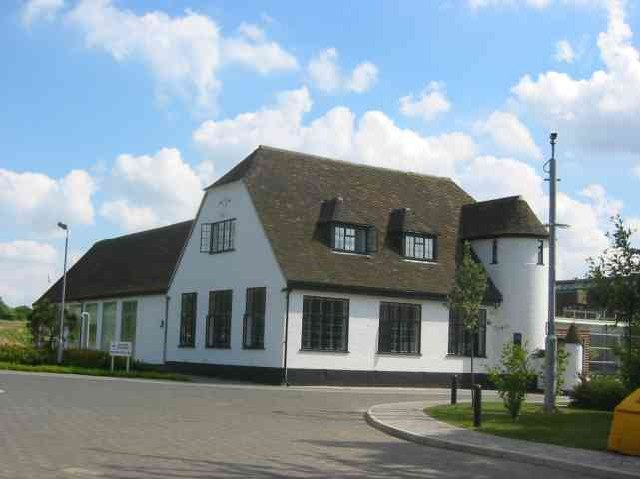
- Headquarters in Kings Langley, England
- Company type: UK Limited company
- Industry: Energy
- Founded: 1981
- Headquarters: Kings Langley, England
- Products: Electricity generation, wind turbines and solar plants
- Website: https://www.res-group.com

The RES Group (Renewable Energy Systems) is the world's largest independent renewable energy company, having been in the sector for more than 40 years. As of 2023, the company had established more than 23 gigawatts of renewable energy projects worldwide and supported more than 12 gigawatts operations. Employing more than 2500 people in 14 countries, it operates onshore and offshore in wind and solar energy, in energy storage and in transmission and distribution.

== History ==
Renewable Energy Systems Limited is a private limited company that was incorporated in 1981 with the role of developing, financing, constructing and managing wind farms and solar plants.

== Locations ==
Since 2003, RES has been headquartered at Beaufort Court, Kings Langley, Hertfordshire in the UK.

The company has offices in Australia, the Americas (Brazil, Canada, Chile, Mexico, Panama and the United States), Europe (Denmark, France, Germany, Ireland, Italy, Norway, Poland, Portugal, Romania, Spain and Sweden), Turkey, and the United Kingdom.

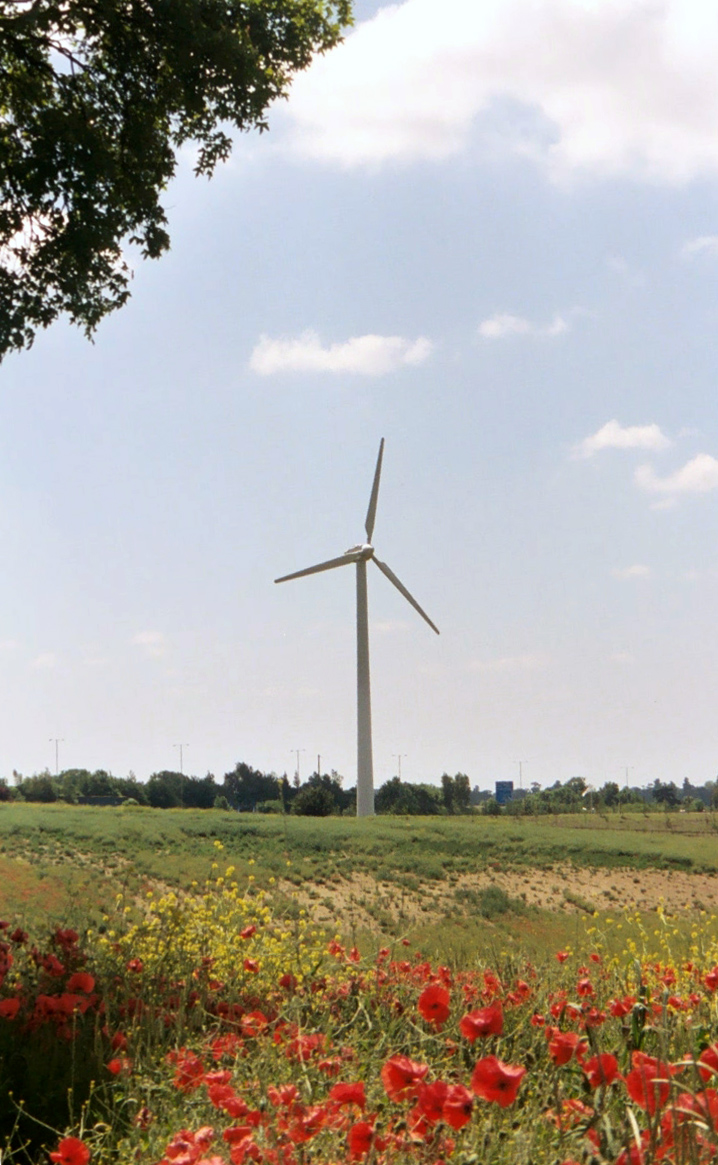
The RES Group operates a wind turbine at its headquarters at Beaufort Court, Kings Langley, UK

== See also ==
- Solar power in the United Kingdom
- Wind power in the United Kingdom
- Blyth Biomass Power Station
