= Wind power in Australia =

Wind power installed capacity and generation in Australia

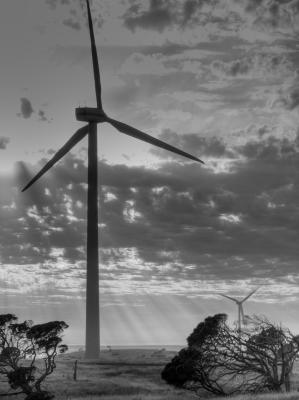
Early morning at the 239 MW Lake Bonney Wind Farm

Wind power is a major contributor to electricity supply in Australia. As of September 2024, the grids of the eastern and southern Australia states have an installed wind capacity of around 13.3 GW, and output peaked at 9.2 GW in May 2025. Wind power accounted for 13.4% (or 31.9 TWh) of Australia's total electricity production in 2024.

== Wind resources ==
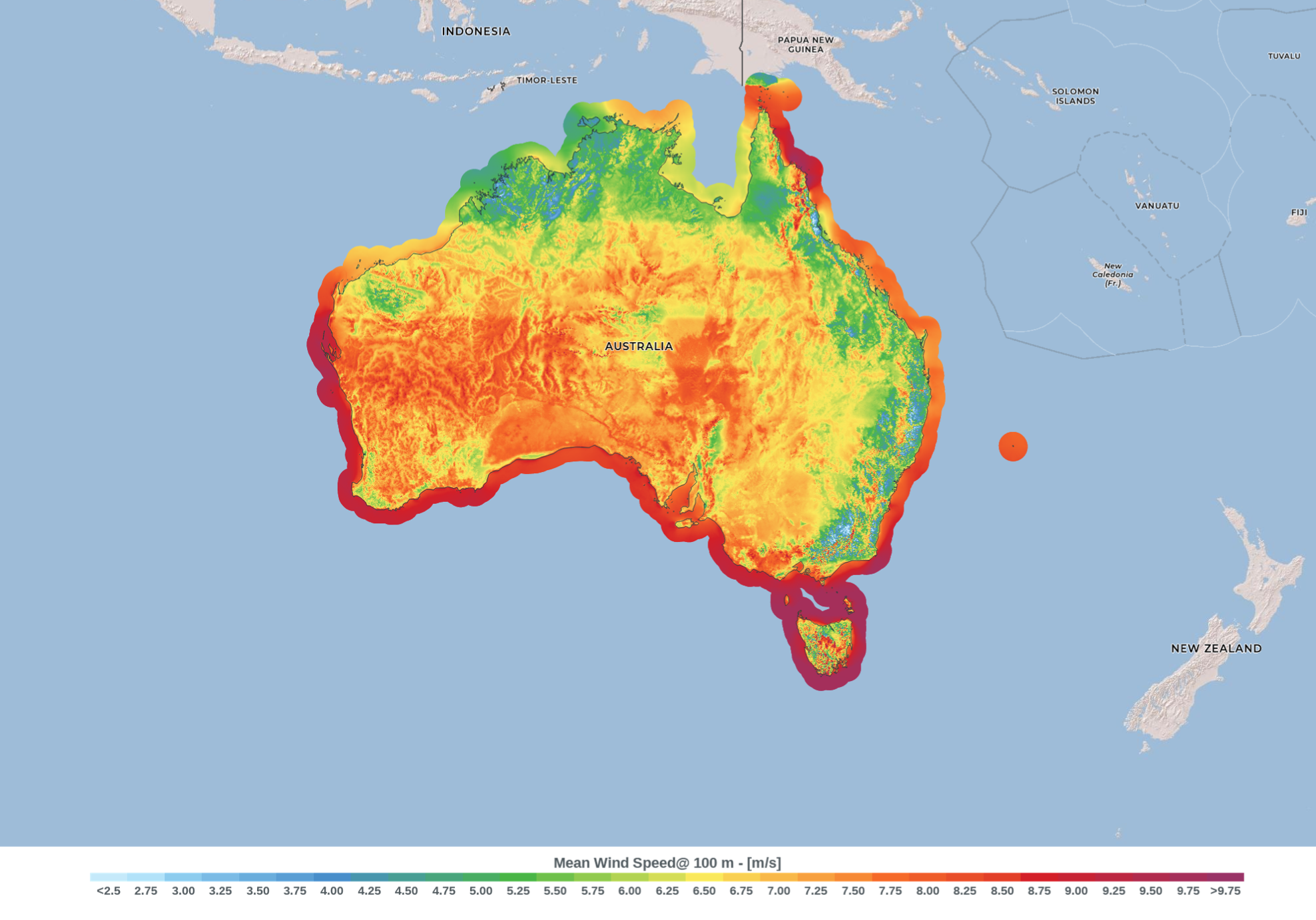
Map of wind resources in Australia

The abundant wind resources in Australia provide for the country to grow its renewable energy sector. The southern coastline lies in the Roaring Forties. Sites have average wind speeds above 8–9 m/s at turbine hub height.

Australian wind farms produce an average capacity factor range of 30–35%. South Australia's large share (along with nearby Victoria) means most of Australia's current wind power occurs around the same time. On a wider scale, the correlation between South Australia and New South Wales is around 0.35, while the correlation between South Australia and Tasmania is 0.1—0.2. Queensland has near zero (or slightly negative) correlation with the other states, but can be more negative during a week-long wind drought.

These numbers are lower than the inter-state correlation for solar. Wind speeds are slightly negatively correlated with electricity demand.

As of 2025 all of Australia's wind capacity is designated as onshore wind, but in December 2022, the federal government officially designated the Bass Strait off Gippsland as Australia's first offshore wind zone. In March 2024 the Victorian government legislated a target of 2GW of offshore wind power by 2032 and 9GW by 2040.

== Wind farms ==
As of September 2024, there were 90 operational wind farms in Australia, totalling 11,420 MW in capacity.

The largest wind farm is Coopers Gap Wind Farm in Queensland, which began generating to the grid in June 2019, with a capacity of 453 MW. Most of Australia's wind farms are situated in coastal areas.

By generating capacity, the ten largest wind farms in Australia are:

No.	Project	State	Capacity (MW)
1	MacIntyre Wind Farm Project (expected completion 2026)	Queensland	1026
2	Coopers Gap Wind Farm	Queensland	453
3	Macarthur Wind Farm	Victoria	420
4	Snowtown Wind Farm	South Australia	369
5	Hallett Wind Farm	South Australia	351
6	Hornsdale Wind Farm	South Australia	315
7	Lake Bonney Wind Farm	South Australia	278
7	Sapphire Wind Farm	New South Wales	270
8	Ararat Wind Farm	Victoria	240
9	Murra Warra Wind Farm	Victoria	226
10	Collgar Wind Farm	Western Australia	222

Australia's first commercial wind farm, Salmon Beach Wind Farm, near Esperanza in Western Australia, operated for 15 years from 1987 but was decommissioned due to urban encroachment. It has since been replaced by Ten Mile Lagoon Wind Farm and Nine Mile Beach Wind Farm.

== Wind power by state ==
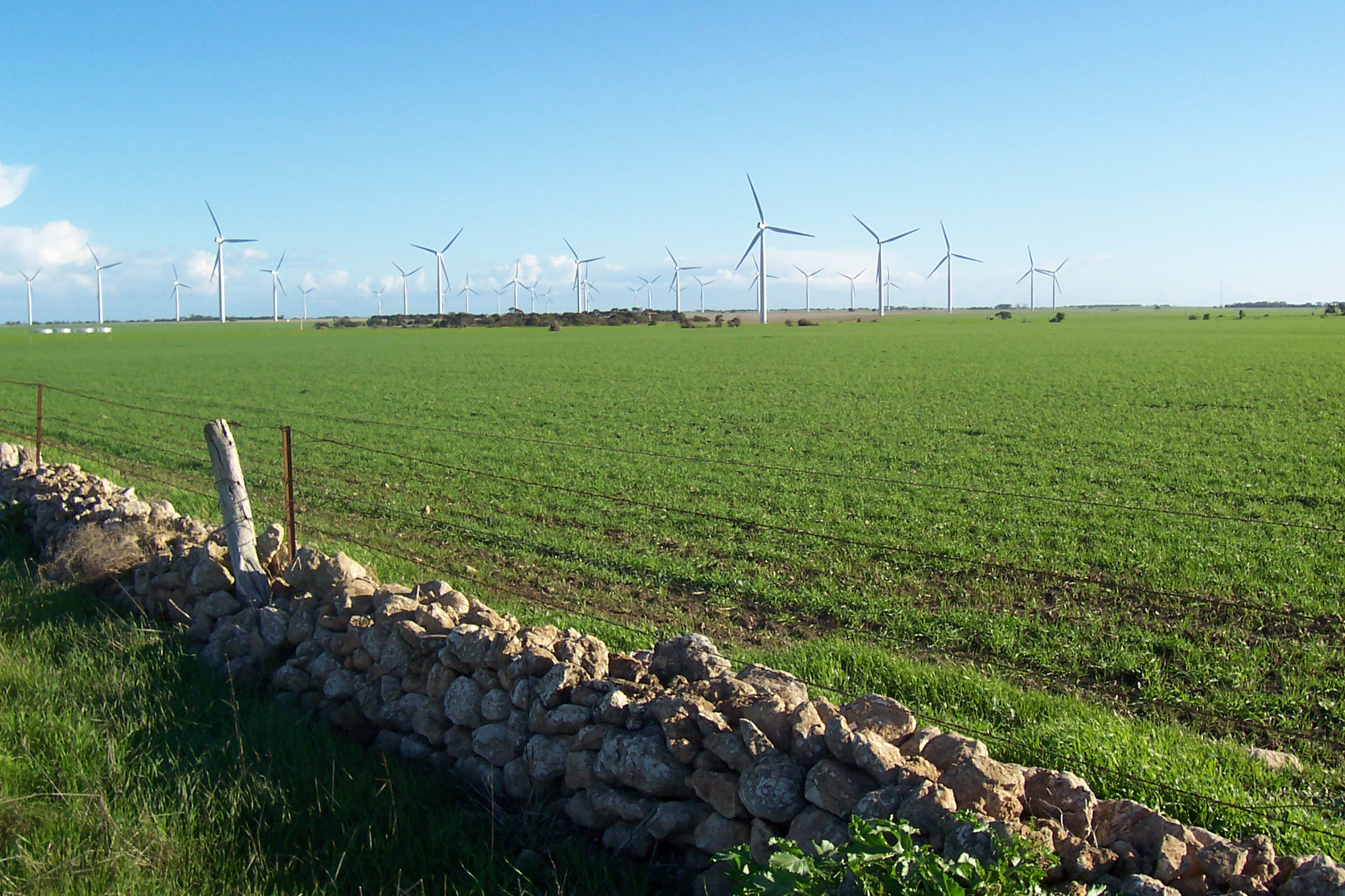
Wattle Point wind farm near Edithburgh, South Australia

A full listing of all the wind farms in Australia can be found in the List of wind farms in Australia. Relevant state articles are:

- New South Wales wind power
- Queensland wind farms
- South Australia wind power
- Tasmania wind farms
- Victoria wind farms
- Western Australia wind farms

Installed capacity by state

The following figures are based on capacity and generation as of the end of 2020. Proposed figures are updated to December 2020.

Note that figures may not agree with aggregate figures previously stated, due to different data sources and reporting dates contained within them.

#	State / territory	Wind power capacity				Proposed	
#	State / territory	Installed capacity				Under construction or committed	
#	State / territory	Projects	Turbines	Total MW	Penetration (%)	Projects	Total MW
1	Victoria	31	1,004	2,610	13.3	10	1,537
2	South Australia	24	820	2,053	41.5	1	86
3	New South Wales	20	698	1,902	6.8	4	729
4	Western Australia	16	?	638	12.9	4	746
5	Tasmania	5	194	563	14.2	0	0
6	Queensland	6	279	1025	2.2	4	826
	Australia	102	2,995+	8,891	9.9	23	3,924

In 2019, South Australia supplied 29.2% of Australia's wind power, fulfilling 41% of the state's electricity requirements. By the end of 2011, wind power generation in South Australia had reached 26%, surpassing coal-fired power for the first time. At that point, despite comprising only 7.2% of Australia's population, South Australia possessed 54% of the country's installed wind capacity.

Victoria also possesses a use of the system. In August 2015, the Victorian government announced financial support for new wind farms as part of an initiative to promote renewable energy within the state. This initiative aimed to expedite the construction of a modest 100 MW of new wind energy, representing a $200 million investment. The government estimated that 2400 MW worth of Victorian projects had been approved but remained unbuilt.

Installed capacity (nameplate) refers to the theoretical maximum capacity of the engineered design under perfect operating conditions. The accepted AEMO rating is the capacity factor rating that accounts for approximately 30 to 35 percent of the installed or nameplate capacity.

== Economics ==
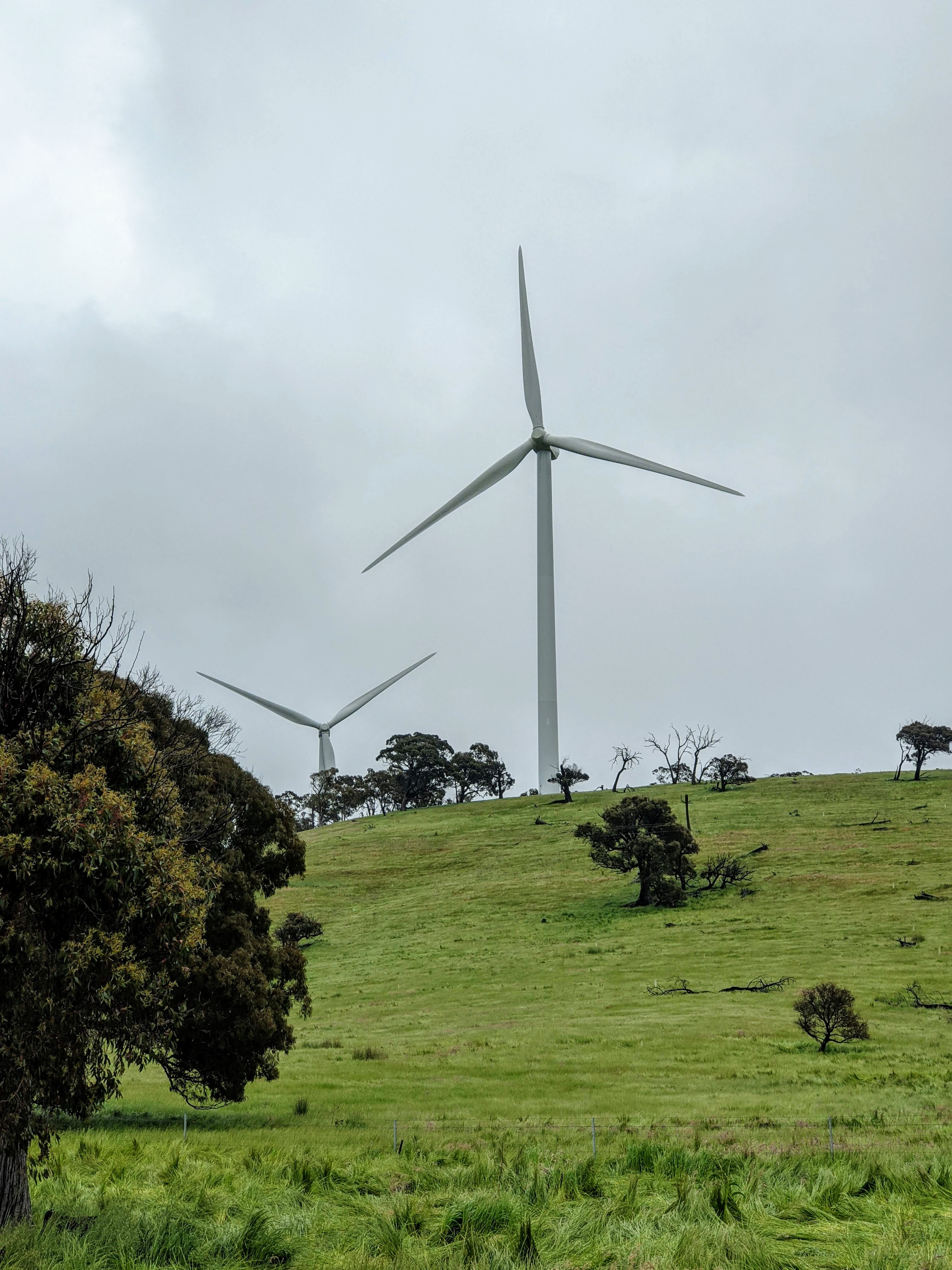
Cullerin Range Wind Farm in New South Wales

Wind developments typically entail substantial upfront capital costs, with comparatively lower operating expenses. Nevertheless, maintenance costs can accumulate over time due to the necessity for periodic replacement of components susceptible to wear.

In contrast, conventional energy sources such as gas and coal demand significant initial capital investments and incur ongoing operating costs for maintenance and fuel. Gas and coal power stations also generally have longer operational lifespans compared to wind turbines. When adequately maintained, coal and gas plants can remain operational for up to three times longer than wind turbines.

Despite these complexities, existing data indicate that wind energy is one of the most cost-efficient renewable energy sources but approximately two times the cost of coal-generated power in 2006. When the costs associated with pollution were factored in, it was competitive with coal- and gas-fired power stations. By 2014, wind had the lowest levelised cost of energy (LCOE) of any power source in Australia; however, the cost of photovoltaics has since dropped below that.

A 2012 study by SKM on the economic benefits of wind farms in Australia found that, for every 50 MW in capacity, a wind farm delivered various benefits.

== Environmental impact ==
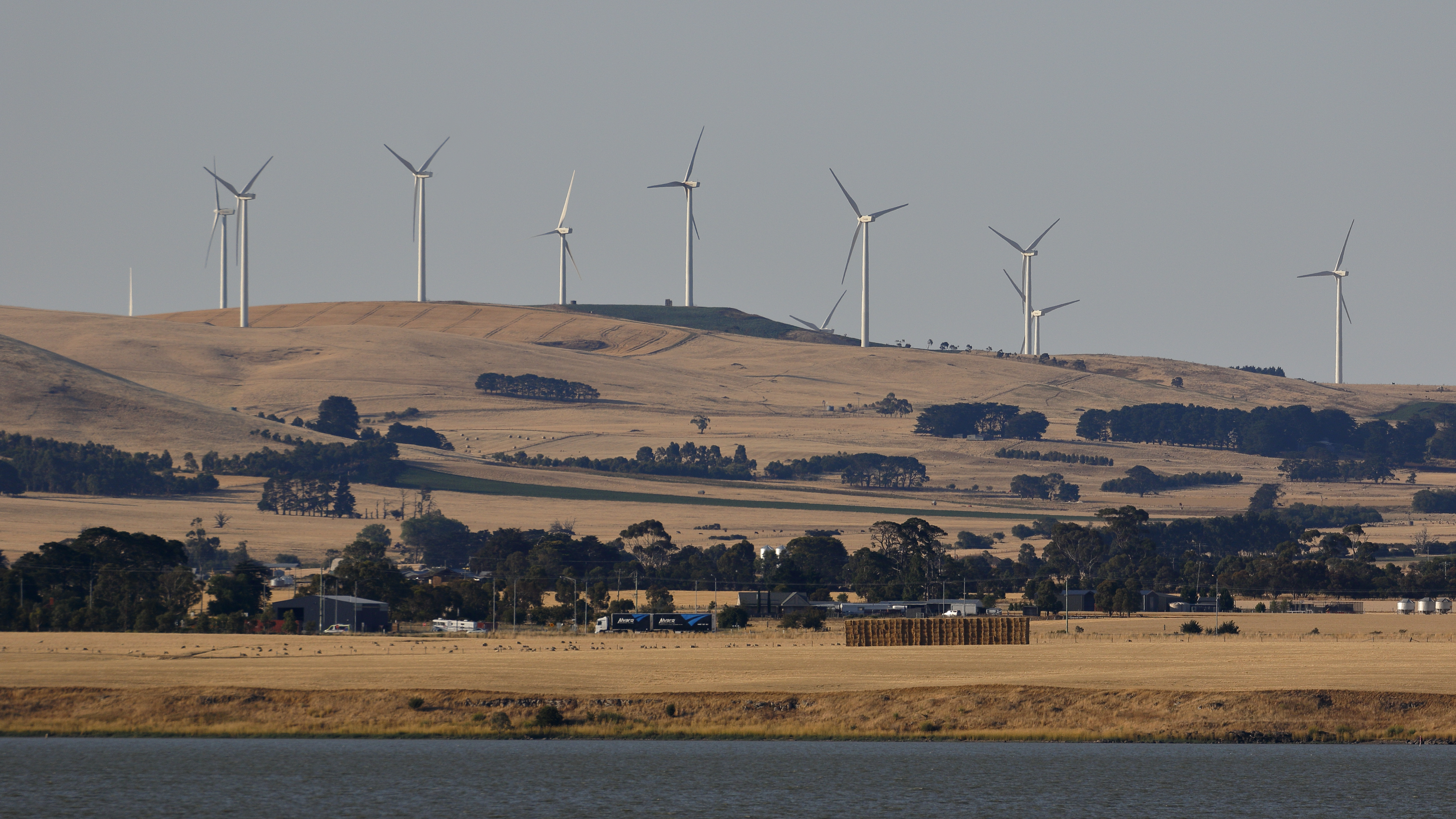
Waubra Wind Farm in Victoria

Australia is the fifth highest per capita emitter of greenhouse gases with 25.8 tonne CO_{2}-e per person annually, ranking first of the industrialised countries, and ranks sixteenth of all countries in total country emissions with 495 Mt CO_{2}-e per annum. It is one of the major exporters of coal, the burning of which releases CO_{2} into the atmosphere. It is also one of the countries most at risk from climate change according to the Stern report. This is partially because of the size of its agriculture sector and long coastline.

Landscape and heritage issues can be a significant issue for certain wind farms. However, these are minimal when compared with the environmental effects of coal. When appropriate planning procedures are followed, the heritage and landscape risks should be minimal. People may still object to wind farms, perhaps on the grounds of aesthetics, but their concerns should be weighed against the need to address the threats posed by climate change and the opinions of the broader community.

Overseas experience has shown that community consultation and direct involvement of the general public in wind farm projects have helped to increase community approval. Some wind farms become tourist attractions.

The Garnaut Climate Change Review, the Carbon Pollution Reduction Scheme and the Mandatory Renewable Energy Target announced by the Australian Government involve a reduction in Australian greenhouse gas emissions. and wind power would deliver greenhouse gas.

Based on the 2010 figures for electricity production of 5 TWh nationally, it is estimated that wind power saved Australia 5,100,000 tonnes of CO_{2} emissions in that year. In relative terms, that is calculated to be the equivalent of removing 1,133,000 cars from the nation's roads.

== Politics ==
From 2001 to early 2006, the main driving force for the establishment of wind farms in Australia was the government's Mandatory Renewable Energy Target (MRET). However, by mid-2006, sufficient renewable energy had been installed or was under construction to meet the small MRET target for 2010.

In November 2007, when the Rudd (Labor) government was elected in Australia, it ratified Australia's commitment to the Kyoto Protocol, promised a target of 20% renewable power by 2020 and to do more to reduce Australia's greenhouse gas emissions. As a result, several new wind power projects were proposed in anticipation of an expanded MRET.

== Major wind projects ==
In January 2022, construction began on the Goyder South development, which is expected to become one of Australia's largest wind farms. Run by French firm Neoen, the project expects to be able to provide 209 MW of power generation by 2024, and a similar amount again when construction is complete.

In south east Queensland, Australia's first gigawattscale wind project is in development: the MacIntrye facility (923 MW), majority owned by Spanish energy firm Acciona, and the Karara Wind Farm (103 MW), under CleanCo.

As of April 2023, some wind projects underway in Victoria is the 756 MW stage one of the Golden Plains development in Rokewood.

== See also ==
- Australian Renewable Energy Agency
- Geothermal power in Australia
- List of large wind farms
- Renewable energy debate
