= WinWinD =

Finnish wind turbine company

WinWinD Ltd
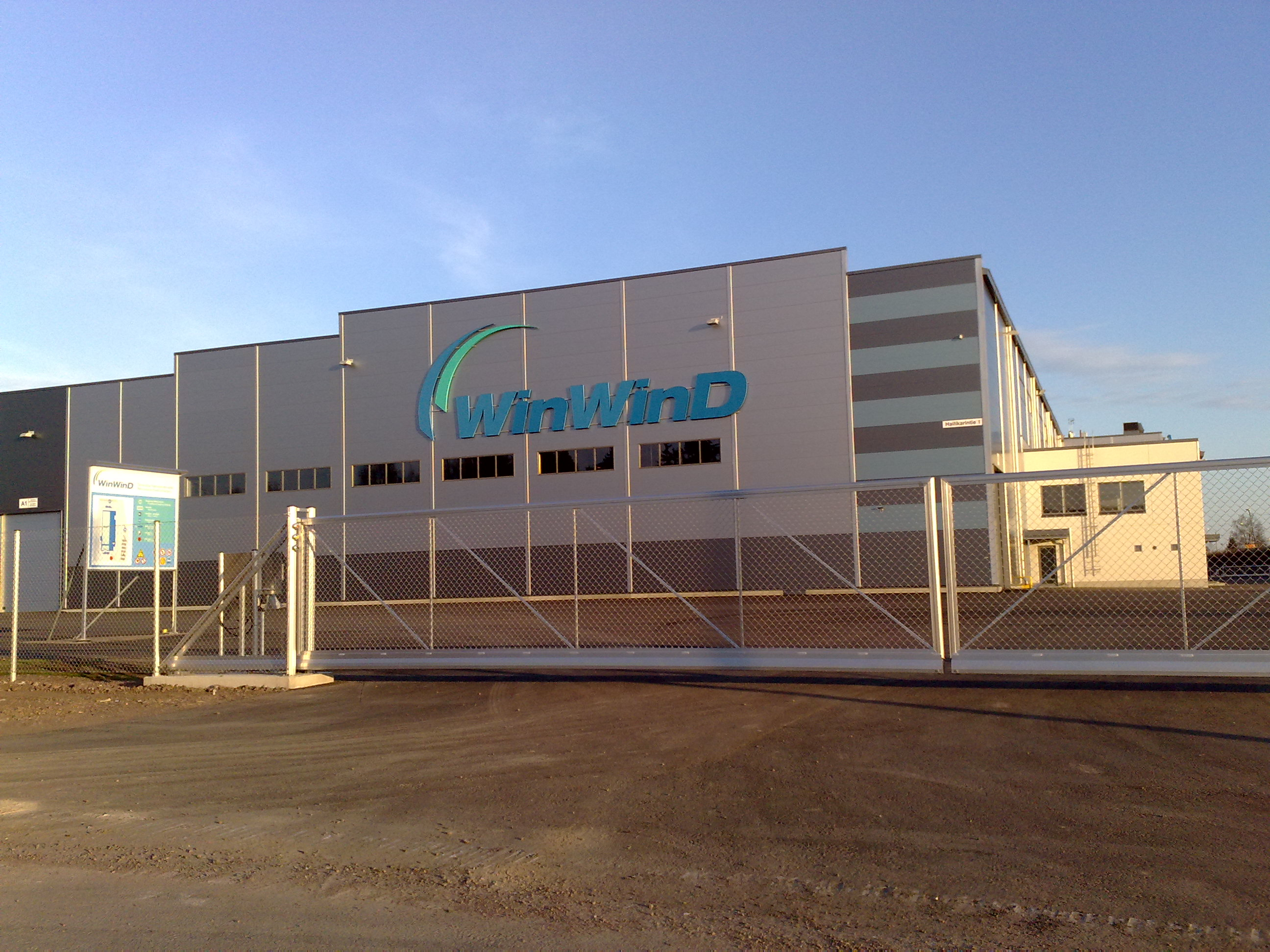
- WinWinD facility in Hamina
- Industry: Wind power industry
- Founded: 2000
- Headquarters: Espoo, Finland
- Key people: P Kumar, Chief Operating Officer (COO)
- Products: Wind turbines
- Number of employees: 600 (2013)
- Parent: WinWinD Oy
- Subsidiaries: Winwind Power Energy Private Limited

WinWinD was a wind turbine manufacturer headquartered in Espoo, Finland. It manufactured and supplied wind turbines with capacity of 1 and 3 MW.

The company was founded in 2000 in Oulu. In 2006, Chinnakannan Sivasankaran's Siva Group of India acquired majority control in WinWinD. In September 2008, the Abu Dhabi Future Energy Company (Masdar) invested €120million in WinWinD acquiring 40% stake of the company. In addition to Siva and Masdar, the Finnish investment fund Suomen Teollisuussijoitus (Finnish Industry Investment) has a stake in WinWinD.

The 3MW wind turbine has an innovative and compact medium speed drive train. The nacelle design is similar to Multibrid 5MW wind turbine by aerodyn Energiesysteme GmbH.

WinWinD has assembly factories in Hamina, Finland, and Chennai, India. It employs more than 800 people globally. In addition to Finland, WinWinD turbines produce energy in Sweden, Estonia, France, Portugal, the Czech Republic and India.

== Hamina factory ==
WinWinD started up a 3 MW wind turbine manufacturing facility at Port of Hamina in 2009.

== Vengal factory ==
WinWinD's 1 MW turbines and blades are manufactured at Vengal, India since September 2009.

== Turbines ==
- WWD-1 (1 MW wind turbine)
- WWD-3 (3 MW wind turbine)
- WinWinD3 (3 MW wind turbine)

== See also ==
- List of Offshore Wind Farms
- List of wind turbine manufacturers
- Renewable energy industry
- Wind Power
