= RRB Energy =

Wind power generation company based in New Delhi

RRB Energy Limited
- Type: Limited
- Industry: Wind power industry
- Founded: 1987
- Founder: Rakesh Bakshi
- Headquarters: New Delhi, India
- Area served: Global
- Key people: Rakesh Bakshi (Chairman & Managing Director)
- Products: Wind turbines
- Number of employees: ~2,000+
- Website: www.rrbenergy.com

RRB Energy Limited is a privately owned company that serves in the realm of wind power generation based out of New Delhi. The production plants of the company are based in Delhi and Tamil Nadu. RRB Energy has nationwide presence in India from Tamil Nadu, Maharashtra, Madhya Pradesh, Karnataka, Gujarat and Rajasthan. The company also has a government approved R&D facility which develops higher MW capacity turbines.

== History ==
The company was incorporated in 1987 under the brand name Vestas RRB India Limited and was renamed as RRB Energy Limited in 2008. The company was founded by Rakesh Bakshi who introduced the concept of Wind Energy to the Country. The company's main objective has been to produce Wind Electric Generators (WEGs). RRB Energy was the first company to Introduce pitch regulated WEGs in India and is one of the oldest manufacturers of WEGs.

== Products ==
The company produces the following win turbines:

- V27-225 kW (13m/ 14m Blade options)
- V39-500 kW (Based On V47 660 kW Platform)
- Pawan Shakthi (PS)-600 kW (Based On V47 660 kW Platform)
- Pawan Shakthi (PS)-1800 kW

== Services ==
The company also provides:

- Project infrastructure services and
- O&M services

RRB Energy provides its products and services under the following models:

- Turnkey solution: The company shoulders the overall responsibility starting from project conceptualization to completion inclusive of operation and maintenance.
- Equipment supply: Under this model, the company is responsible only for supply of equipment.
- Equipment supply with erection and commissioning: This model includes supply of equipment with erection, commissioning and maintenance offered.

== Partnerships ==
In 2011, a delegation from Uruguay visited RRB's production unit in Poonamallee to explore business association with the company.

In 2012, a high level delegation from Chile visited the company's manufacturing units to struck business association deal.

In 2015, company had a meeting with China-based companies led by China Photovoltaic Industry Association (CPIA) to explore possibilities for striking a partnership.

== See also ==
- List of wind turbine manufacturers
- Renewable energy industry
- Wind power
