= KK Group =

Danish energy technology company specializing in wind power systems

- Type: Private
- Industry: Electrical engineering Wind power Power electronics
- Founded: 1969; 57 years ago in Herning, Denmark
- Founders: Kai F. Pedersen; Knud V. Jensen
- Headquarters: Ikast, Denmark
- Area served: Worldwide
- Key people: Mauricio Quintana (CEO)
- Owner: A.P. Moller Holding
- Website: kkgroup.com

KK Group A/S is a Danish technology company based in Ikast, Denmark. It provides power, control, cooling, monitoring, and service systems for the wind industry and other energy-intensive sectors. Since 2019, it has been owned by A.P. Moller Holding.

== History ==
KK Group was founded in 1969 by Kai F. Pedersen and Knud V. Jensen. In 1981, a factory was established in Herning, Denmark, and it was renamed as kk-electronics. In 1990, the company began supplying control systems to Bonus Energy. In 2014, it changed its name from kk-electronic to KK Wind Solutions. In 2019, A.P. Moller Holding acquired the group from Solix Group.

In the 2020s, KK Group expanded its operations through acquisitions. In 2020, it acquired Gram & Juhl, a condition monitoring company. In 2021, it appointed Mauricio Quintana as chief executive officer and acquired PCH Engineering, an industrial vibration monitoring company. In 2023, it acquired Vestas’ converter and controls business, with operations in Denmark, India, and China. Later in 2023, it acquired Nissens Cooling Solutions, a company specialising in cooling components, systems, and modules.

As of 2025, KK Group operates in more than 10 countries. It has expanded beyond wind energy into areas like hydrogen and industrial. In 2025, it also opened a large manufacturing facility in Bengaluru, India.

== History of Usage ==
The KK group was used in dark or offensive memes relating to or supporting the KKK during 2021–2023. This led to the company sending a formal notice to a small YouTube influencer to stop or legal action will be taken, this interaction was never public but was leaked when said influencer got hacked.
