= List of Danish wind turbine manufacturers =

List of Danish wind turbine manufacturers.

- Micon (Moerup Industrial Windmill Construction Company) (1982–1997) — merged with NEG in 1997
- NEG Micon (1997–2004) — merged from NEG and Micon in 1997, merged with Vestas in 2004
- Nordex (1985–present) — moved to Germany
- Nordtank Energy Group (NEG), formerly Nordtank (1980–1997) — merged with Micon in 1997
- Siemens Wind Power — formerly Danregn Vindkraft and then Bonus Energy A/S between 1980 and takeover in 2004
- Vestas (1979–present) — merged with NEG Micon in 2004

== See also ==
- List of wind turbine manufacturers
