= List of wind turbine manufacturers =

This is a list of notable wind turbine manufacturers and businesses that manufacture major wind turbine components.

== Small wind turbine manufacturers ==
- Bergey (United States)
- Bornay (Spain)
- Enessere (Italy)
- Hi-VAWT (Taiwan)
- quietrevolution (United Kingdom)
- Southwest (United States) – closed 20 February 2013 which is now Primus windpower
- TUGE Energia (Estonia)
- Urban Green Energy (United States) – no longer manufacturing small wind turbines as of 2018

== Large wind turbine manufacturers ==
=== Current manufacturers ===
- China Guodian Corporation (China) – turbine brand United Wind Power
- CRRC (China)
- CSIC (Chongqing) – HZ Wind Power (China)
- Envision Energy (China)
- Goldwind (China) – the world's largest manufacturer of wind turbines
- SANY (China)
- Shanghai Electric (China) (SEwind)
- Sinovel (China)
- NovaWind (Russia) – Subsidiary of Rosatom
- GE Renewable Energy (United States)
- PacWind (United States)
- Elecon Engineering (India)
- Inox Wind (India)
- RRB Energy Limited (India)
- Suzlon (India)
- Senvion Wind Technology India (Owned by Alfanar) – Rebranding globally as ReTechnologies GMBH
- World Wind (India)
- Enercon (Germany)
- Nordex (Germany)
- UNISON (South Korea)
- Hanjin (South Korea)
- Doosan (South Korea)
- Hyosung (South Korea)
- Hyundai Heavy Industries (South Korea)
- Hitachi (Japan) – acquired the wind turbine business of Fuji Heavy Industries in 2012
- Japan Steel Works (Japan)
- Machine Sazi Arak (Iran)
- Mingyang Wind Power (China)
- Mitsubishi Heavy Industries (Japan)
- Končar (Croatia)
- Mapna (Iran)
- Siemens Gamesa Renewable Energy (Germany/Spain)
- STX Windpower (South Korea / The Netherlands)
- TECO (Taiwan)
- Vergnet (France)
- Vestas (Denmark)
- WEG (Brazil)
- Xant (Belgium)
- Broadwind Energy (United States)

=== Past manufacturers ===
- Acciona (Spain) merged with Nordex
- Northern Power Systems (United States)
- DeWind (Germany/United States) – subsidiary of Daewoo Shipbuilding & Marine Engineering (South Korea)
- Alstom Wind (Spain) – subsidiary of General Electric since 2015
- Enron Wind (now defunct) – wind-turbine manufacturing assets bought by General Electric in 2002
- Fuji Heavy Industries (Japan) – the wind turbine business was acquired by Hitachi in 2012
- Gamesa (Spain)
- NEG Micon (Spain) – was bought by Gamesa
- NEG Micon – now part of Vestas
- Nordic Windpower (United States) – bankrupted in 2012
- Raum Energy Inc. (Canada)
- Scanwind (Norway) – bought by General Electric in 2009
- Senvion (Germany) – assets bought by Siemens Gamesa Renewable Energy in 2019
- Prokon (Germany)
- WinWinD (Finland)
- Frisia (Germany)
- Clipper (United States)
- DSTN (DSME Trenton) (Canada)
- Windflow (New Zealand)

== See also ==
- AWEA (American Wind Energy Association)
- EWEA (European Wind Energy Association)
- List of Danish wind turbine manufacturers
- List of offshore wind farms
- Lists of wind farms
- Wind power in the People's Republic of China
