= White Rock Wind Farm =

Wind farm in New South Wales, Australia

- Country: Australia
- Location: Glen Innes, New South Wales
- Coordinates: 29.79°S 151.54°E
- Status: Operational
- Construction began: May 2016
- Commission date: August 2017
- Construction cost: A$450m (Stage 1 & 2) (2011 dollars)
- Owner: Goldwind Australia

Wind farm
- Type: Onshore
- Hub height: 89.5 metres (294 ft)
- Rotor diameter: 121 metres (397 ft)

Power generation
- Units operational: 70 × 2.5 MW
- Make and model: Goldwind 121
- Nameplate capacity: 175 MW
- Capacity factor: 33.27% (average 2018-2021)
- Annual net output: 510.0 GWh (average 2018-2021)

External links
- Website: https://whiterockwindfarm.com/

White Rock Wind Farm is a wind farm in the Australian state of New South Wales. It is in the New England region of northern New South Wales, 40 kilometres (25 mi) east of Inverell and 20 kilometres (12 mi) west of Glen Innes. It is south of the Gwydir Highway. The Sapphire Wind Farm is north of the highway and Glen Innes Wind Farm is south of the highway closer to Glen Innes. It is approved for up to 119 wind turbines, and stage 1 has been completed with 70 turbines. In 2011 it had an estimated construction cost of A$450m.

== Operations ==
The wind farm began increasing output grid power in July 2017, was fully commissioned in February 2018 and has operated since then. The generation table uses eljmkt nemlog to obtain generation values for each month.

White Rock Wind Farm Generation (MWh)
Year	Total	Jan	Feb	Mar	Apr	May	Jun	Jul	Aug	Sep	Oct	Nov	Dec
2017	80,622	N/A	N/A	N/A	N/A	N/A	N/A	1,563*	15,204*	10,029*	17,452*	18,473*	17,901*
2018	520,686	30,826*	47,075*	51,720	47,184	39,874	46,462	43,343	49,259	40,780	40,160	39,692*	44,311
2019	525,373	30,786	56,922	44,355	50,959	43,413	44,342	49,503	37,389	45,090	34,497	42,634	45,483
2020	501,095	33,449	43,159	54,146	29,951	44,302	36,758	45,327	51,724	48,544	32,179	32,371	49,185
2021	492,988	43,138	45,912	47,525	38,168	30,667	41,479	49,611	36,052	30,623	43,138	48,021	38,654

Note: Asterisk indicates power output was limited during the month.
