= TUGE Energia =

Company based in Estonia

TUGE Energia OÜ
- Company type: LLC
- Industry: Wind power industry
- Founded: 2015
- Headquarters: Estonia
- Key people: Indrek Gregor, Chief Executive Officer (CEO)
- Products: Wind turbines
- Website: tuge.ee

TUGE Energia is a wind turbine manufacturer headquartered in Estonia. It manufactures and supplies small wind turbines with capacity of 2, 10 and 50 kW.

The company was founded in 2015 in Tallinn. At the beginning of 2017, it has more than 20 small wind turbines installed in Estonia and Finland. The company also provides complementary solar and battery storage solutions.

The company is a member of a World Wind Energy Association.

== Turbines ==
- TUGE2 (2 kW wind turbine, datasheet)
- TUGE10 (10 kW wind turbine, datasheet)
- TUGE50 (50 kW wind turbine, datasheet)

== See also ==
- Small wind turbine
- List of wind turbine manufacturers
- Renewable energy industry
- Wind Power
