= Cattle Hill Wind Farm =

Wind farm in Tasmania, Australia

- Country: Australia
- Coordinates: 42.151°S 146.688°E
- Status: Operational
- Construction began: 2018
- Commission date: 2020
- Construction cost: $400 million
- Owner: Power China
- Operator: Goldwind Australia

Wind farm
- Type: Onshore
- Hub height: 100 metres (328 ft)
- Rotor diameter: 140 metres (459 ft)

Power generation
- Units operational: 26 × 3.0 MW; 22 × 3.2 MW
- Make and model: Goldwind GW140 3S
- Nameplate capacity: 148.4 MW
- Capacity factor: 37.24% (2021)
- Annual net output: 484.2 GWh (2021)

External links
- Website: www.cattlehillwindfarm.com

Cattle Hill Wind Farm is a wind farm developed and constructed by Goldwind Australia in Tasmania, Australia.

The site is located on the eastern shore of Lake Echo on the southern side of the Central Plateau of Tasmania and connects into TasNetworks's transmission network at the adjacent Waddamana substation.

The facility began construction in 2018 and was completed in 2020 with the installation of 48 Goldwind GW140 3MW turbines, each standing at 170m tall.

The wind farm's output of 144MW is equivalent to the consumption of approximately 63,000 homes.

== Operations ==
The generation table uses eljmkt nemlog, a tracker for the Australian National Energy Market, to obtain generation values for each month. Grid connection started in January 2020, and was fully commissioned in August 2020.

Cattle Hill Wind Farm Generation (MWh)
Year	Total	Jan	Feb	Mar	Apr	May	Jun	Jul	Aug	Sep	Oct	Nov	Dec
2020	272,457	2,220*	6,064*	11,749*	16,892*	21,191*	18,036*	5,887*	32,825*	49,670	27,377	37,299	43,247
2021	484,150	34,730	28,090	35,777	53,537	48,022	34,207	49,537	51,835	48,981	39,993	24,477	34,964

Note: Asterisk indicates power output was limited during the month.
