= Aerovide =

German company developing wind turbines

AEROVIDE
- Company type: GmbH
- Industry: Wind power
- Founded: 1983
- Headquarters: Rendsburg, Germany
- Area served: Worldwide
- Key people: Markus Rees, Rainer Osthorst (directors)
- Products: Wind turbines
- Owners: Markus Rees, Rainer Osthorst
- Number of employees: 34
- Website: www.AEROVIDE.com

The AEROVIDE GmbH (formerly aerodyn Energiesysteme GmbH) is a German company and engineering consultancy that develops wind turbines. This means that they develop and design the rotor blades, the tower and carry out the mechanical and electrical engineering of the wind turbine, including the turbine controller. Development is ambiguous in the industry. AEROVIDE does not do wind farm planning but is a specialised engineering company. Its headquarters are located in Rendsburg, Schleswig-Holstein.

== History ==
The company was founded in 1983 by pioneers Sönke Siegfriedsen, Robert Müller and Friedrich-Wilhelm Frank as “aerodyn” in Damendorf. In 1986 the company changed to “aerodyn Energiesysteme GmbH”. Rainer Osthorst entered the company in 1991, Markus Rees in 1993. In 1994 the company moved from Damendorf to Rendsburg (Germany). The company works on commissions and own projects.

In 1997 aerodyn Energiesysteme GmbH started to develop a 1500 kW wind turbine generator system for the newly founded company “pro+pro Energiesysteme GmbH”. In 2000 Denker & Wulf AG pushed ahead the amalgamation of pro+pro, HSW, BWU, and Jacobs Energie, into Repower Systems AG, later Sevion S.A.

In 2010, work on an offshore wind park in China with the Chinese company Zhejiang Windey Engineering started.

In 2013, founder Siegfriedsen left the company and Markus Rees and Rainer Osthorst became directors.

Since 2020 the company is solely owned by the Managing Directors Markus Rees and Rainer Osthorst.

End of the year 2020 the trade mark agreement ends and a re-naming of the company into “AEROVIDE GmbH” was necessary.

== Company ==
AEROVIDE serves customers worldwide. In addition to its development engineering team in Germany, the company has had a sales office in Shanghai (China) since 2006. Many OEMs manufacture wind turbines or rotor blades on the basis of the prototype developments from AEROVIDE (former Aerodyn), f.e. HSW, Jacobs Energie, BWU, Fuhrländer, A&R SGL Rotec, EUROS, Südwind Borsig Energy, DeWind, Jeumont, Tacke, Pioneer Wincon Energy Systems Private Limited, SINOI, Ventis, Autoflug, Tacke Windtechnik, Senvion, Goldwind, Pfleiderer, AREVA Multibrid, WinWind, CSIC HZ Windpower, BARD Offshore, SANY, Shanghai Electric, CNBM, Mingyang Wind Power, Goudian United Power, HEAG, UNISON, China Windey, Hyosung Heavy Industries, POWEEND S.A.S., MAPNA

== Awards ==
- 1999: IF Design Award for "Multibrid"
- 2009: HUSUM WindEnergy Technology Award 2009 for SCD-Technology
- 2014: Bronze Medal Award by Windpower Monthly: drive trains aeroMaster 3.0
- 2020: Gold Medal Award by Windpower Monthly: 111m rotor blade

== Other Sources ==
- "Introduction: Wind Power and Renewable Energy industry in China" (PDF). ntnu.
- "Turbine manufacturers in China:in a state of frenzy!" (PDF).
- "TwinCAT 3 bei 5-MW-Windenergieanlage in China" (PDF). pc-control.
