= Stockyard Hill Wind Farm =

Wind farm in Victoria, Australia

- Country: Australia
- Coordinates: 37°32′9″S 143°15′5″E
- Status: Operational
- Construction began: May 2018
- Owners: Palisade Investment Partners Limited (49%); Nebras Power (49%); Goldwind Australia (2%)
- Operator: Goldwind Australia

Wind farm
- Type: Onshore
- Hub height: 110 metres
- Rotor diameter: 140 metres

Power generation
- Units operational: 149 × 3.57 MW
- Make and model: Goldwind GW140-3.57MW
- Nameplate capacity: 530 MW
- Capacity factor: 40.9% (projected)
- Annual net output: 1900 GWh (projected)

External links
- Website: www.stockyardhillwindfarm.com.au

Stockyard Hill Wind Farm is a wind farm project in Victoria (Australia). In October 2022 the project completed its hold point tests, and was approved by the Australian Energy Market Operator and Network Services Provider to generate up to its maximum capacity of 511MW into the National Electricity Market.

The development was initiated by Windpower Australia and bought by Origin Energy. In May 2017, Origin sold the development to Goldwind Australia for A$110 million and signed a power purchase agreement to buy the electricity and Renewable Energy Certificates for less than A$60/MWh.

The facility consists of 149 approved wind turbines at a site approximately 35km west of Ballarat between Beaufort and Skipton. The forecast cost is A$900 million (US$750 million) In December 2009, the original plan for 242 turbines, the plan was changed to only have 157 turbines. The Victorian minister of planning approved the 157 turbines, in October 2010.

In 2013 Origin contemplated selling the project before production would have begun, but decided to continue the project.

Construction commenced in May 2018 on a design that has 149 wind turbines. The final turbine installation occurred in December 2020 and operations began in July 2021. The Goldwind 3S turbines have a capacity of 3.57 MW, with a hub height of 110 metres, tip height of 180 metres, and rotor diameter of 140 metres. The farm is projected to generate 1900 GWh of energy annually, at a corresponding capacity factor of about 40.9%. It will power approximately 425,000 homes annually. Origin Energy has a power purchase agreement to buy all electricity until 2030.

== Operations ==
The wind farm registered its first grid output in July 2021. In June 2022, the wind farm reached an output of 508.4MW, or 99.49% of its maximum registered output of 511 MW.

Stockyard Hill Wind Farm Generation (MWh)
Year	Total	Jan	Feb	Mar	Apr	May	Jun	Jul	Aug	Sep	Oct	Nov	Dec
2021	307,556	N/A	N/A	N/A	N/A	N/A	N/A	6,544*	13,813*	32,661*	52,208*	69,296*	96,888*
2022	1,404,781	105,442*	93,705*	93,968*	99,742*	95,479*	171,289*	120,838	172,662	132,041	116,451	101,139	102,025
2023	1,625,690	100,844	105,686	124,576	113,519	110,008	206,066	178,105	143,457	116,793	151,992	125,172	149,472
2024		126,150	108,809	113,289	95,444	89,237	127,368						

Note: Asterisk indicates power output was limited during the month.

== See also ==
- Wind power in Australia
