= CS Wind =

South Korean wind turbine manufacturer

- Native name: 씨에스윈드
- Company type: Public
- Traded as: KRX: 112610
- Industry: Wind power industry
- Founded: 1988; 38 years ago
- Founder: Gim Seong-gon
- Headquarters: 723, Eonju-ro, Gangnam-gu, Seoul, South Korea
- Key people: Kim Seong-kwon, chairman and co-chief executive officer
- Products: Wind turbine towers
- Website: www.cswind.com/en/

CS Wind is a South korean wind turbine tower manufacturer. The company's name comes from a pseudonym used by the founder's son, "ChoongSan (Korean: 중산; Hanja: 重山; RR: Jungsan; MR: Chungsan)", and means "a heavy mountain that can endure every hardship."

== History ==
Company founder Gim Seong-gon worked for a building supply company in Saudi Arabia. In 1984, he founded his own construction firm there, and the firm expanded and began manufacturing construction materials and parts. Later, the firm made chimneys for fossil fuel burning plants. CS Wind began in 1988, although the name came later. The firm transitioned from building chimneys to wind turbine towers in 2003.

== Locations ==
CS Wind has manufacturing facilities in China, Malaysia, Taiwan, Turkey, Portugal, the United States, and Vietnam. The firm's US factory in Pueblo, Colorado was acquired from Vestas in 2021 and is undergoing a large expansion. It is the world's largest wind turbine tower manufacturing facility.
