= Hesselbach Wind Farm =

Wind farm in North Rhine-Westphalia, Germany

Windpark Hesselbach
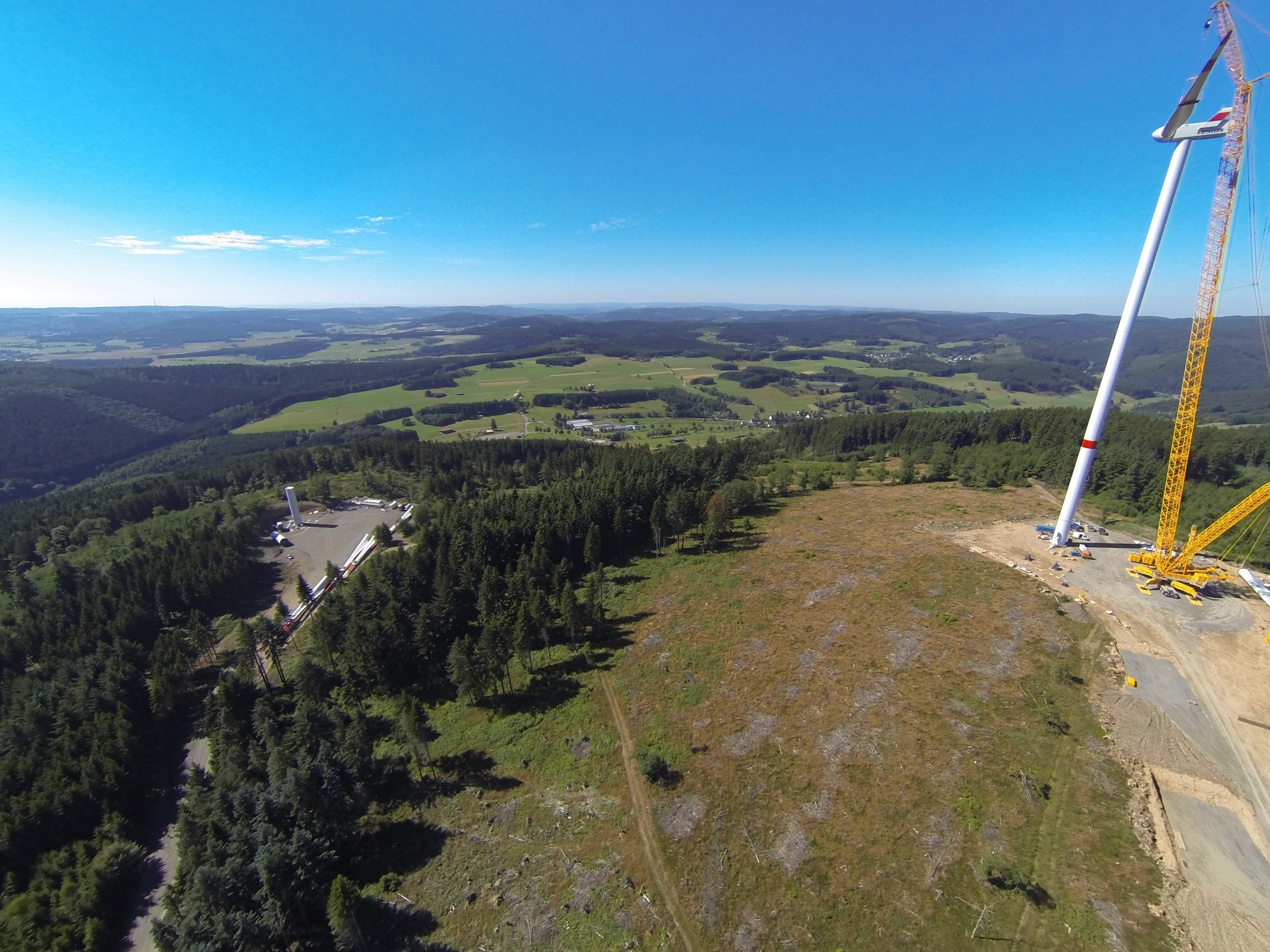
- Building of a wind turbine
- Country: Germany
- Coordinates: 50.9076°N 8.3839°E
- Status: Operational
- Commission date: 2013/2014
- Owner: Wittgenstein new energy
- Operator: Wittgenstein new energy

Wind farm
- Type: Onshore

Power generation
- Units operational: 8 × 3 MW
- Make and model: Vestas V112
- Nameplate capacity: 24 MW

External links
- Commons: Related media on Commons

The Hesselbach Wind Farm (also known as Windpark Hesselbach) is North Rhine-Westphalia's first forest wind farm. It is situated in the forests of Bad Laasphe-Hesselbach. It consists of eight turbines, each with 3 megawatt (MW) capacity and was opened 2013.

== Units ==
Unt	Commission	Coordinates
1	2013	50.887807°N 8.384221°E
2	2013	50.891137°N 8.378148°E
3	2013	50.903642°N 8.374135°E
4	2013	50.904264°N 8.380144°E
5	2013	50.912572°N 8.375852°E
6	2013	50.916603°N 8.372333°E
7	2014	50.899814°N 8.377200°E
8	2014	50.907594°N 8.383900°E
