= Glen Innes Wind Farm =

Wind farm in New South Wales, Australia

- Country: Australia
- Coordinates: 29°44′S 151°36′E
- Owner: Nexif Energy

Wind farm
- Type: Onshore
- Rotor diameter: 140 m (460 ft)
- Rated wind speed: 11 m/s (36 ft/s)

Power generation
- Units planned: 25 × 3.6 MW

External links
- Website: gleninneswindfarm.com.au

Glen Innes Wind Farm is a wind farm proposal in the Australian state of New South Wales. It is in the New England region of northern New South Wales, between Inverell and Glen Innes. It is south of the Gwydir Highway and closer to Glen Innes than the larger nearby White Rock and Sapphire Wind Farms. Glen Innes wind farm is 15 kilometres (9.3 mi) west of Glen Innes and being developed by Nexif Energy. It is expected to be built with 25 wind turbines, each with a capacity up to 3.6MW.
