= Gullen Range Wind Farm =

Wind farm in New South Wales, Australia

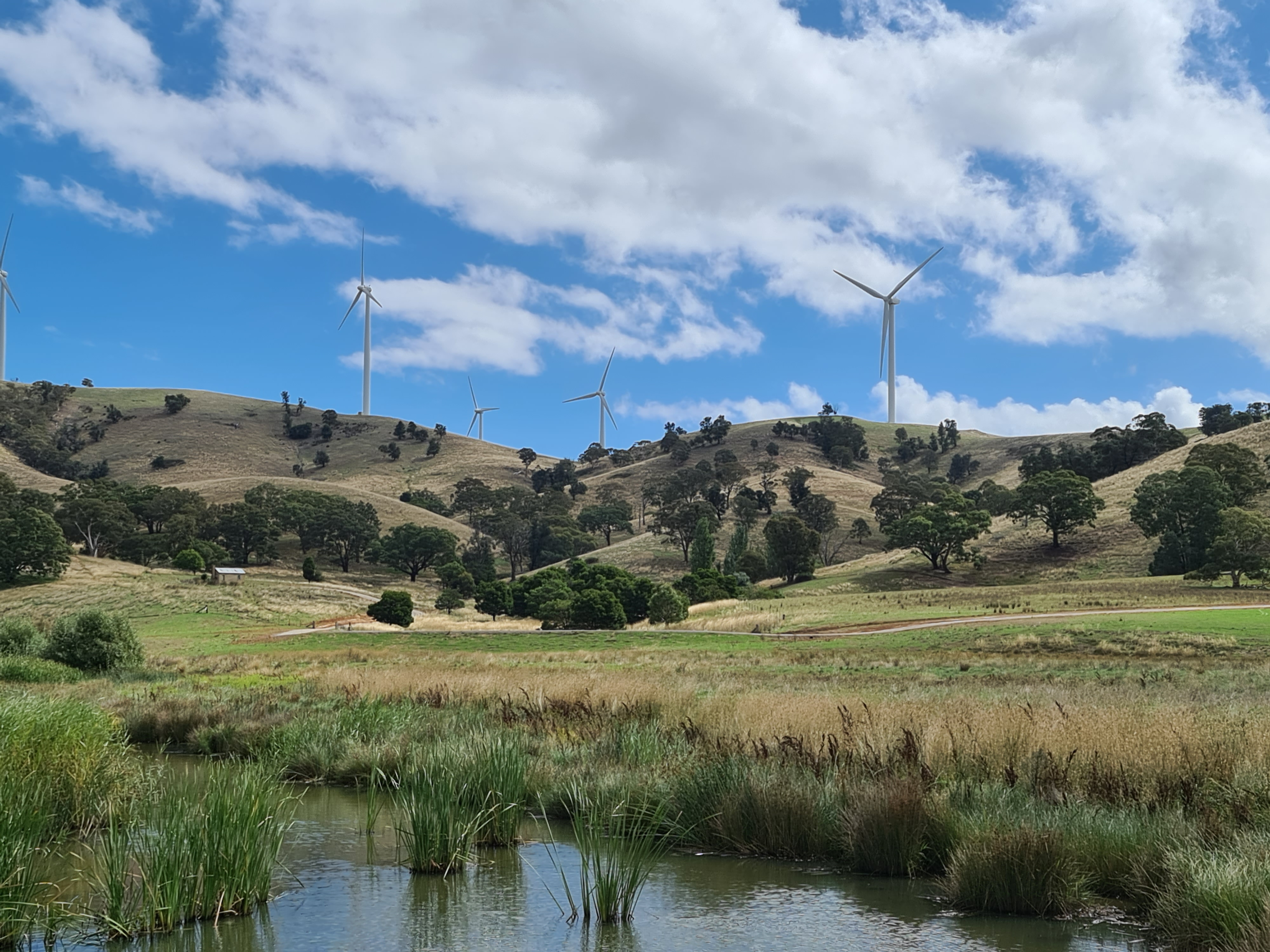
- Part of Gullen Range Wind Farm and Wollondilly River from Pomeroy
- Country: Australia
- Location: Gullen Range
- Coordinates: 34°34′S 149°27′E
- Status: Operational
- Construction began: 2012
- Commission date: 2013
- Owner: New Gullen Range Wind Farm

Wind farm
- Type: Onshore
- Hub height: 80 metres (262 ft) Goldwind GRW100-2.5MW; 85 metres (279 ft) Goldwind GW82-1.5MW
- Rotor diameter: 82 metres (269 ft); 100 metres (328 ft)

Power generation
- Units operational: 17 × 1.5 MW; 56 × 2.5 MW
- Make and model: Goldwind GW82-1.5MW; Goldwind GRW100-2.5MW
- Nameplate capacity: 165.5 MW

External links
- Website: gullenrangewindfarm.com

Gullen Range Wind Farm is a wind farm in the locality of Gurrundah in the Southern Tablelands region of New South Wales, Australia. It consists of 73 wind turbines and produces up to 165.5MW of electricity. It is owned by BJCE Australia and built and operated by Goldwind Australia. Gullen Range was BJCE Australia's first wind farm, when it bought the project in 2014.

The wind farm consists of two different turbine models, both manufactured by Goldwind. There are 56 GRW100-2.5MW turbines with 100m rotor diameters on 80m towers (total height 130m) which generate 2.5MW of electricity. There are also 17 smaller GW82-1.5MW turbines with 82m rotor diameters on 85m towers (total height 126m) which produce 1.5MW of electricity.

The project was developed by Epuron, who sold it to Goldwind Australia before construction. Goldwind began construction in 2012. It began generating electricity in 2013 and was fully operational by 23 December 2014. Goldwind onsold 75% of the project to BJCE Australia.
