= Vensys Energy =

Vensys Energy AG
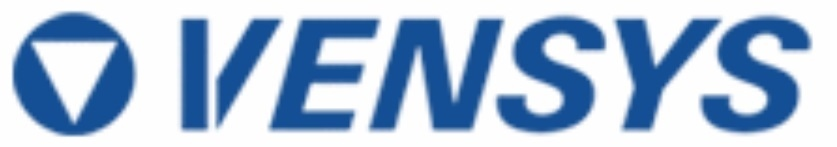
- Headquarters: Germany
- Products: Wind turbines
- Parent: Goldwind
- Website: www.vensys.de

Vensys Energy AG (stylized as VENSYS) is a German gearless wind turbine manufacturer which is majority-owned by Chinese turbine manufacturer Goldwind.

Vensys licenses its products to several non-European manufacturers of wind turbines. In addition, Vensys itself manufactures plants on a small scale at its headquarters in Neunkirchen, Saarland.

The Vensys group includes Vensys Elektrotechnik GmbH in Diepholz, which manufactures the electrical components, and NEVEN Windenergie GmbH in Trier, which is involved in project development.

The Goldwind Wind Energy GmbH based in Hamburg has been the company's largest single shareholder since 2008 with a 70% stake.

== Licensee ==
- Goldwind
- Enerwind
- Eozen
- ReGen
