= Sustainable industries =

The phrase sustainable industries is related to the development of industrial processes in a sustainable way. The phrase refers to greening of energy intensive industries such as the textiles, steel, cement, and paper industries.

== Origin ==
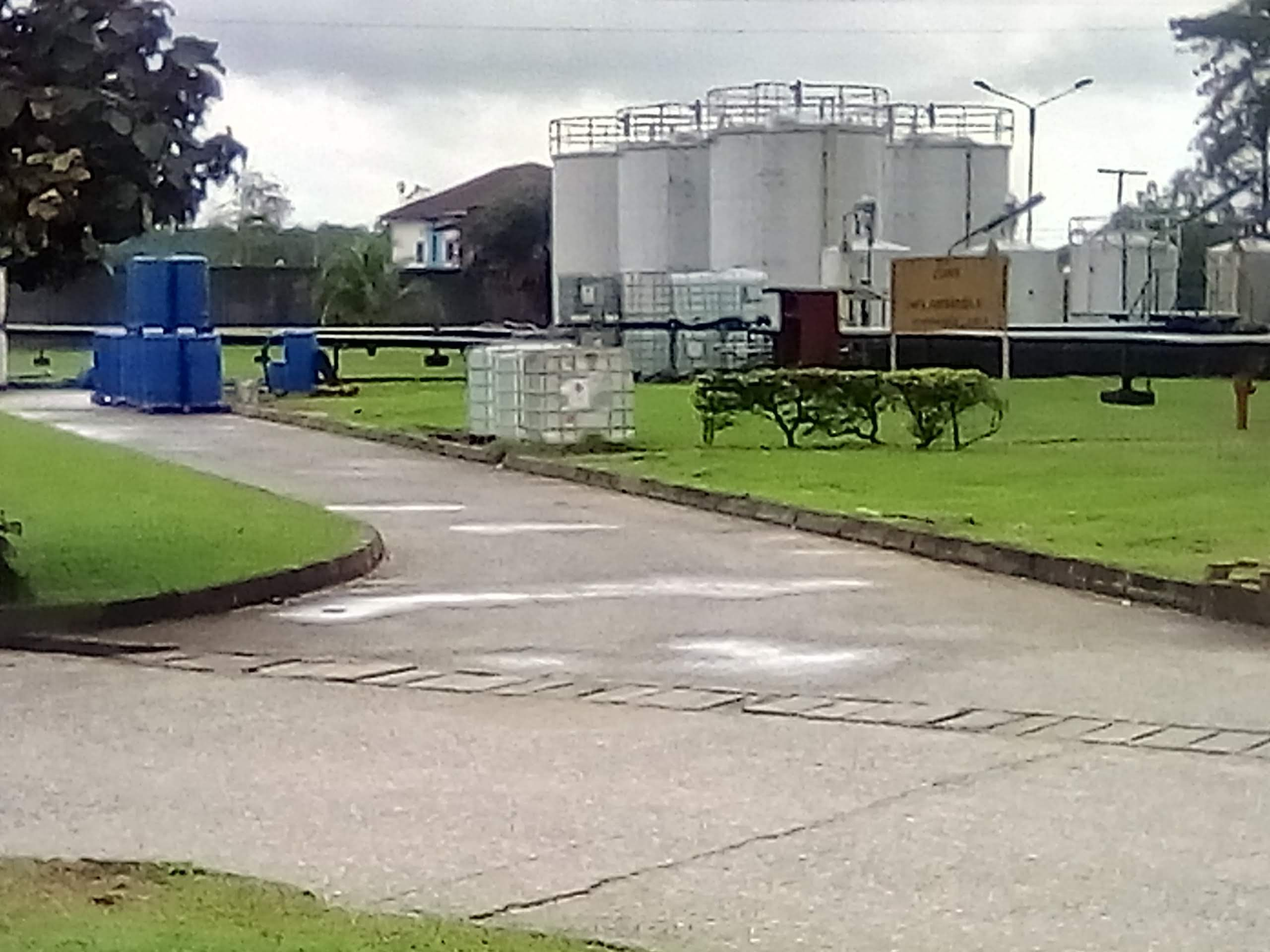
Industries au Cameroun - 3

Sustainability is a social goal for individuals to co-exist on the Earth including economic, social, and environmental dimensions. A Sustainable industry would allow for growth in all three dimensions while maintaining the quality of the environment and countering major environmental issues.

A report was released in 1987 by the United Nations called Our Common Future in which the concept of sustainable development was listed for the first time along with its guiding principles. Then, there is a mention of the phrase "sustainable industries" appeared in 1990 in a story about a Japanese group reforesting a tropical forest to help create sustainable industries for the local populace.

Soon after, a study entitled “Jobs in a Sustainable Economy” by Michael Renner of the Worldwatch Institute was published, using the term "sustainable industries". This 1991 report concluded, "Contrary to the jobs-versus-owls rhetoric that blames environmental restrictions for layoffs, the movement toward an environmentally sustainable global economy will create far more jobs than it eliminates. The chief reason: non-polluting, environmentally sustainable industries tend to be intrinsically more labour intensive and less resource intensive than traditional processes." Among the features of sustainable industry offered in the paper were energy efficiency, resource conservation to meet the needs of future generations, safe and skill-enhancing working conditions, low waste production processes, and the use of safe and environmentally compatible materials. Some of the benefits, however, would be offset by higher prices (due to labor costs) and a theoretically larger population needed to perform the same amount of work, increasing the agricultural and other loads on the system. In 1992 the Rio Earth Summit led to thinking about achieving global sustainability by acting locally. This was called Agenda 21, and including creating local food banks, community gardens, clean water sanitation programs, and ensuring that all children have access to quality education.

In February 2003 the business magazine Sustainable Industries was first published, offering news and analysis of core industries such as sustainable energy and green building. By 2012 the company had expanded to include digital media and event production with the Sustainable Industries Economic Forum in the U.S. Sustainable Industries merged with Triple Pundit in 2011. Then in 2013 Sustainable Industries stopped publishing under its masthead. In 2015 the United Nations adopting the Sustainable Development Goals, which is a 15-year plan that addresses 17 global interconnected issues, leading to a more sustainable future.

== Development ==
The development of these industries requires a major shift in consumption patterns towards the purchase of environmentally friendly goods. The barriers that need to be removed in order for these goals to be reached include high prices, gaps in consumer awareness, and bias in purchasing behaviors. The technology to shift to green industries already exists but often times the price is too high to for industries to invest in them. Industrial development requires a critical amount of demand for consumers. As income grows demand begins to shift to more sophisticated goods, therefore industrial development will cause a surge of new industries. The expansion of industries will allow for an increase in product efficiency, lower prices, and creation of a mass market. As industries emerge and disappear a new source of income is available for consumers, workers, and entrepreneurs. The cheaper and higher quality goods have positive impact on the surrounding society.

Sustainable businesses consider a wide range of environmental, social, and economic factors when making their business decisions and monitor their impact to make sure short-term profits don't turn out to be an issue in the long-term. Sustainable initiatives gain public support and are financially performing well.

== Examples ==
Sustainable industry strategies are unique to each type of industry and there is no right way to do it however they all tie into common business goals and values. These values could be:

- Optimizing supply chains and reducing greenhouse emissions
- Using renewable energy resources to power facilities
- Sponsoring education for youth and the local community
- Using sustainable materials in manufacturing

== Key Aspects ==
The key ingredient to sustainable industries is Green consumption, which stems from "the desire to safeguard resources for future generations while also enhancing their quality of life." Sustainable development for businesses is a form of protection, allowing them to overcome adversity, become more stable, and maintain societal values. There are four key reasons why sustainability is important for businesses. First, It ensures economic sustainability as the living standards are improving without future economic crises. Second, it ensures social sustainability as it encompasses human health, justice, education, and providing opportunities for everyone within a society to be equal. Third, it ensures environmental sustainability and aims to maximize our resources while conserving and protecting our beautiful environment. Lastly, it is beneficial for the business, and their advertising as individuals are willing to pay more for something that contributes to the safety and longevity of our economy, environment, and society.

Sustainable industries are constantly developing and innovating their infrastructure to meet the needs of society without destroying the environment for future generations. Sustainable development calls for more responsible consumption and production patterns. By adopting various different energy efficient technologies and diversifying our energy resources through renewables, businesses pose less effects to our environment and our health.

== See also ==
- Renewable energy industry
- Sustainability
- Green infrastructure
