= Ming Yang Smart Energy =

Chinese company producing wind turbines

Ming Yang Smart Energy Group Ltd
- Native name: 明阳智慧能源集团股份公司
- Type: Public
- Industry: Wind power
- Predecessor: Guangdong Mingyang Wind Power Technology
- Founded: 2006
- Headquarters: Zhongshan, Guangdong, China
- Key people: Chuanwei Zhang (Chairman & CEO)
- Products: Wind turbines
- Subsidiaries: Jilin Mingyang Datong Wind Power Technology; Tianjin Mingyang Wind Power Blade Technology; Zhongshan Mingyang Wind Power Blade Technology
- Website: www.mywind.com.cn

Ming Yang Smart Energy Group Limited ("Ming Yang", Chinese: 明阳风电) is a Chinese energy provider that produces and installs wind, solar, storage, and hydrogen infrastructure. In 2023, it ranked as the fifth largest wind turbine manufacturer globally and the second largest in offshore wind power installations. The company was listed on the New York Stock Exchange from October 1, 2010, to June 22, 2016, and has been listed on the Shanghai Stock Exchange since January 2019 and on the London Stock Exchange since July 2022, In 2024, it developed the world's largest offshore wind turbine with a capacity of 20 MW. In 2026, the company was banned in the United Kingdom over national security concerns.

== History ==
The company was established on 2 June 2006 as Guangdong Mingyang Wind Power Technology Company Limited and started wind turbine production in 2007, with a prototype of 1.5 MW designed by Aerodyn.

In 2010, Ming Yang started production of SCDs (Super Compact Drives), a two blade turbine by Aerodyn of 2.75 MW and 3.0 MW. In 2013, the new offshore SCD 6.5 MW wind turbine was presented. The first was connected to the grid in 2015.

In 2011, Ming Yang ranked among the top 4 wind turbine suppliers in China and top 10 worldwide.

In 2013, Mingyang won a bid for 87 MW (29 * 3 MW) two-bladed offshore wind turbines near Zhuhai.

In 2022, MingYang received orders for 1 GW of three-bladed 11 MW hybrid-drive wind turbines for Chinese offshore by 2023. In March 2024, the UK government banned Ming Yang throughout the country, citing national security concerns.

== Products ==
In August 2021, Mingyang announced the MySE 16.0-242 offshore wind turbine. At that time, it was the largest offshore wind turbine under development, surpassing the previous largest Haliade-X design by GE Wind Energy.

As of 2022, the company produced the world's largest wind turbine, which is 794 ft (242 meters) tall and has a capacity of 16 MW.

In January 2023, Mingyang announced the MySE 18.X-28X with 140-meter-long blades and a total capacity of 18 MW.
