= Moorabool Wind Farm =

Wind farm in Victoria, Australia

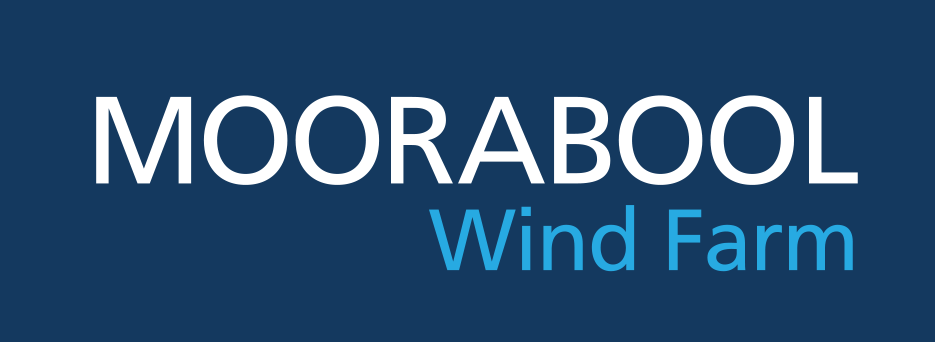
- Country: Australia
- Location: Shire of Moorabool
- Coordinates: 37°42′S 144°12′E
- Status: Operational
- Construction began: July 2018
- Commission date: 2022
- Owner: Goldwind Australia

Wind farm
- Type: Onshore

Power generation
- Nameplate capacity: 321 MW

External links
- Website: mooraboolwindfarm.com

Moorabool Wind Farm is an operational wind farm located 25 km southeast of Ballarat in Victoria, Australia. The wind farm is in two parts: the northern part has 50 turbines, and the southern part has 54 turbines. By December 2021, all 104 turbines had been put into place. The turbines each measure 169 m to the tip of the blade.

== Development and purpose ==
The farm is being developed by Goldwind Australia. When operational, it will be one of three wind farms in Moorabool Shire. The others are Yaloak South Wind Farm and Lal Lal Wind Farm.

When fully operational, the farm will produce up to 312MW of electricity, enough energy to power approximately 228,000 Victorian homes.

The components for the southern section were delivered from the Port of Geelong in a total of 594 oversized loads at a rate of approximately 33 per week from September 2019 to February 2020.

The wind farm commenced partial operation in late 2020. Commissioning was completed in 2022. An integrated battery is being tested to provide grid services.
