= Goldwind Australia =

- Type: Subsidiary
- Industry: Renewable energy
- Founded: 2009
- Headquarters: Barangaroo, Sydney
- Parent: Goldwind
- Website: www.goldwindaustralia.com

Goldwind Australia is the Australian subsidiary of Chinese company Goldwind that builds, owns and operates wind farms and solar farms in Australia. Originating as a developer of wind farms using its own turbines, the company now also focuses on offering its wind turbines and BESS systems to other renewable energy developers to capture broader market share.

== Notable technology ==
Goldwind Australia piloted the country's first grid-connected DC-coupled wind and BESS hybrid at the Moorabool Wind Farm in Victoria in 2025 by retrofitting a 2 MW/4.8 MWh battery system at one of its turbines. The company has announced that it intends fit DC-coupled BESS units to each turbine at all self-developed wind farms.

== List of wind and solar farms ==
Name	Capacity (MW)	Comments	Website
White Rock Wind Farm	175 (Stage 1)	Stage 2 (216MW) under construction	
White Rock Solar Farm	20		
Gullen Range Wind Farm	165.5	Owned by BJCE Australia, Goldwind provide operations and maintenance	
Gullen Solar Farm	10	Owned by BJCE Australia	
Mortons Lane Wind Farm	19.5		
Biala Wind Farm	110	Owned by BJCE Australia	
Agnew Hybrid Renewable Microgrid	18 (wind component)	The first Australian mine site to use a wind farm on its microgrid. Facility owned by EDL.	
Cattle Hill Wind Farm	148.4	80% sold to PowerChina	
Moorabool Wind Farm	312	Northern section (50 turbines) partially commissioned. Southern section (54 turbines) commencing commissioning in 2022.	
Stockyard Hill Wind Farm	530	Bought from Origin Energy in 2017. Turbine installation completed in 2020. Approved for 400MW in May 2022 with further commissioning in progress.	
Esperance Power Project	9 (wind component)		
Clarke Creek Wind Farm	450	Under construction. Owned by Tattarang subsidiary Squadron Energy.	

== See also ==
- List of renewable energy companies by country
