= List of wind power consulting companies =

This is a list of notable wind power companies.

Some wind industry associations, such as the Global Wind Energy Council, the World Wind Energy Association, and WindEurope, provide publicly available membership directories on their websites. Other wind industry associations, such as the Canadian Wind Energy Association and the American Wind Energy Association, have membership directories only available to members.

== Wind Energy Site Assessment Consultants ==
Wind Measurements, Site Assessments, Anemometer Calibration, Remote Wind Sensing, Wind Measurement System Sale

- AFRY
- Arup
- Bureau Veritas
- TUV SUD
- COWI
- DNV
- Fichtner
- Lloyd's Register
- Mott MacDonald
- Ramboll
- Western Electricity Coordinating Council
- Wood Group
- WSP Global
- WSP USA

== Wind Turbines: Power Performance Testing Consultants ==
Power Curve Measurements, Vibration Analysis, Measurement of Rotor Blade Angles, Rotor Imbalance Testing

- AFRY
- DNV GL
- COWI
- Fichtner
- Hatch Ltd
- Intertek
- National Wind Institute (NWI)
- Ramboll
- TUV SUD
- Wood Group
- WSP Global

== Wind Turbines: Design and Certification ==
- Technischer Überwachungsverein (TÜV)
- Bureau Veritas
- DNV GL
- Lloyd's Register

== Industry Analysts ==
- AFRY
- Arup
- BTM Consult
- Bureau Veritas
- COWI A/S
- DNV GL
- Intertek
- Lloyd's Register
- Multiconsult
- Ramboll

== Consultants Acting as Owner's Engineer for Wind Farm Projects ==
- AFRY
- Arup
- Black & Veatch
- Bureau Veritas
- Burns & McDonnell
- COWI A/S
- DNV GL
- Grontmij A/S
- Mott MacDonald
- Multiconsult
- Parsons Brinckerhoff
- Ramboll
- TUV SUD
- Wood Group
- WSP Global

== See also ==
- Energy law
- Energy policy
- Renewable energy
