= Rakesh Bakshi =

Indian climate change activist (1958–2020)

- Born: 4 June 1958; London, England
- Died: 13 April 2020 (aged 61); Delhi, India
- Education: National Institute of Technology, Kurukshetra
- Occupations: Chairman & Managing Director RRB Energy Limited
- Spouse: Seema Bakshi (Deceased Oct 2017)
- Children: Shweathambri Bakshi, Riteesh Mohan Bakshi & Raghav Mohan Bakshi

Rakesh Bakshi (4 June 1958 - 13 April 2020), was an Indian climate change activist, professor, and businessman. He founded Solchrome Private Limited and RRB Energy Limited. In 1991, Rakesh Bakshi was awarded Padma Shri, India's 4th highest civilian award, by then-President of India, Shri. R. Venkataraman, in recognition of his commendable contributions to the field of renewable energy sources. He is the first Indian to be honored with this award for working in the field of renewable energy.

== Early life ==
Rakesh Bakshi was born in London on 4 June 1958. He graduated from the National Institute of Technology Kurukshetra and achieved postgraduate qualifications in computer science and foreign trade. After completing his studies, he set up companies to research, manufacture, and implement renewable power plants. He was a guest lecturer at IIT for a short time.

== Career ==
Rakesh Bakshi is credited as the founder of the following companies that work in the field of researching and manufacturing renewable energy generation equipment, mainly in the area of wind power generation.

- Solchrome Private Limited - the first Continuous Plating Solar Selective Coating Plant established in India.
- RRB Energy Limited
- Eco RRB Infra Private Limited

Rakesh Bakshi contributed as an eco-preneur - an entrepreneur in environmentally-friendly technology and businesses. He ventured into the commercial application of products and services in the field of renewable energy. He was a forerunner in establishing wind power as a major source of power generation in India.

Rakesh Bakshi introduced to the Indian energy sector some of the most advanced technologies in the field of renewable energy and wind power energy from Europe and Canada. Rakesh Bakshi's companies also marketed and exported renewable energy products and services globally, to countries including Spain, Germany, the Netherlands, Denmark, Greece, Malaysia, Mauritius, Botswana, Korea, Australia, Cyprus, the U.K, and Turkey.

== Awards and recognitions ==
- Padma Shri - 1991
- Prince Henrik's Medal of Honour from Denmark - 1997
- Climate Technology Leadership Award United Nations Framework Convention on Climate Change - 1999
- Udyog Rattan
- 2000 Millennium Award
- SESI Business Leadership Award from Solar Energy Society of India- 2005
- Lifetime Achievement Award
- Rotary's "For The Sake Of Honour" Award
- Order of the Star of Italian Solidarity, Knight Commander
- German Cross of the Order of Merit

== Titles ==
- Wind Energy Pioneer
- Green Maharaja

== Personal life ==
Rakesh Bakshi married Seema Bakshi, daughter of Brigadier Dr. Kapil Mohan (chairman and managing director of Mohan Meakin Limited), who comes from one of the most respected and highly illustrious families of India. She died on 11 October 2017 in Chennai. He has three children: Shweathambri Bakshi (daughter), Riteesh Mohan Bakshi (son), and Raghav Mohan Bakshi (son).
