= DeWind =

German wind turbine manufacturer

DeWind Inc.
- Type: Incorporated
- Founded: 1995
- Headquarters: Hamburg, Irving
- Products: Wind turbines
- Website: www.dewindco.com

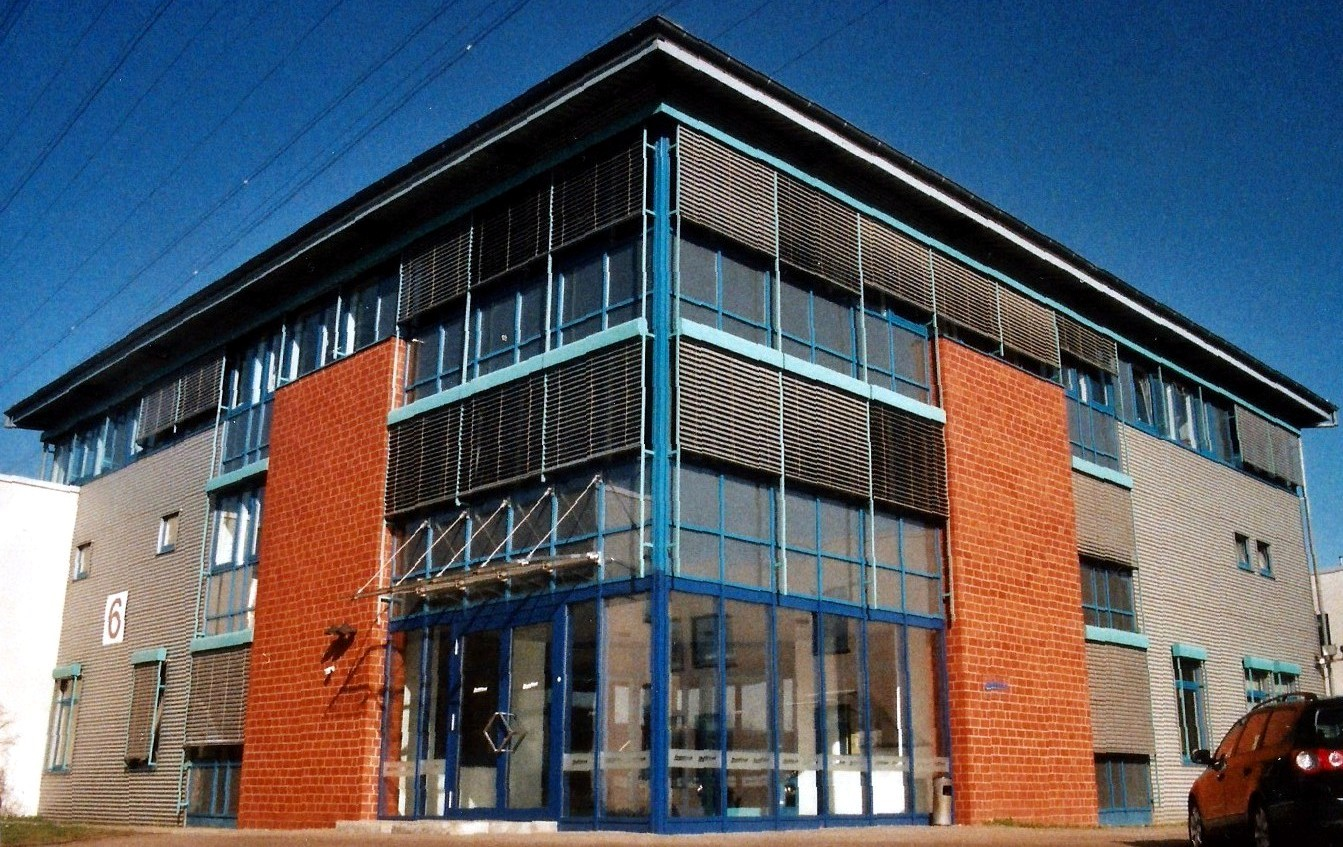
Headquarter in Lübeck before it left in 2014 to Hamburg

DeWind was an internationally active producer of wind power plants, originating in Germany. The company was founded in 1995 as Private Limited Company (GmbH) in Luebeck, Germany by seven shareholders. Five of them actively worked in the company. In 2002 the founders sold 100% of the shares to FKI Plc, Loughborough, UK. It was based in Irving, Texas, and Hamburg, Germany. DeWind had the legal form of a corporation, and, since September 2009, it had been a subsidiary company of Daewoo Shipbuilding and Marine Engineering (DSME), a large shipbuilder based in Korea. Manufacturing took place in Lübeck and Round Rock, Texas.

More than 900 DeWind turbines have been erected worldwide, with a total capacity of over 1600 MW.

The company was since 2015 in liquidation and was deleted in the German Trade Register in December 2017.

== Turbine types ==
The first produced wind turbine was the D4 1996, with a capacity of 500 kW (later 600 kW). In 1999, this turbine was followed by the D6 with 1 MW capacity. In 2000, the capacity of this plant was increased to 1.25 MW. After a development period of two years, in 2002 the D8 went into production with a capacity of 2 MW.

Already in the mid-1990s, the D4 was produced with active pitch regulation as well as a doubly fed induction generator. This technology proved itself and, therefore, was implemented in the following models D6 and D8. Especially advantageous are the decoupling of the rotational speed of the turbine rotor and the grid frequency. By using the inertia of the turbine rotor, it reduces mechanical loads on turbine components and prevents peaks in electricity feed-in.

The D8.2 has been developed based on the D8 and has been in production since 2006. The plant has been equipped with a hydrodynamic windrive Gearbox. This allows the variation of the rotor speed independent of generator speed. A decoupling of generator rotation speed and grid frequency becomes redundant by this means. The synchronous generator of this turbine is coupled directly with the grid. The system is unique on the wind energy market. According to DeWind, it is advantageous regarding the quality of fed-in electricity as well as regarding behaviour in case of grid failure. Also, patents of the wind turbine producer GE Energy are not violated with this technology. The turbine is offered with 50 Hz as well as 60 Hz design.

== Record-holding turbines ==
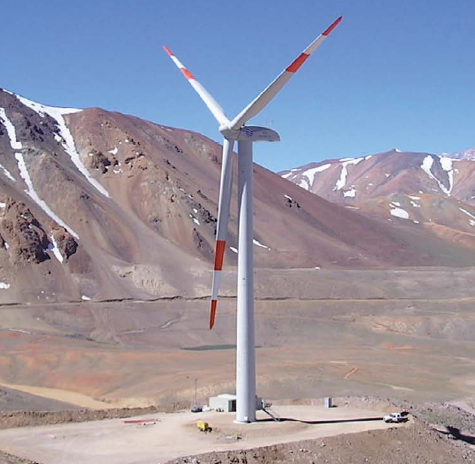
DeWind D8.2 2MW wind turbine at the Veladero mine in San Juan Province, Argentina

The world's highest wind turbine of company DeWind is located in the Andes/Argentina to 4,100 metres (13,500 ft) above sea level. Turbine type D8.2 - 2000 kW / 50 Hz was used for that site. This turbine has a new drive train concept with a special torque converter (WinDrive) of the company Voith and a synchronous generator. The wind turbine was put into operation in December 2007 and has supplied the Veladero gold mine of Barrick Gold with electricity since then.

== See also ==
- List of wind turbine manufacturers
