= BTM Consult =

BTM Consult is an independent consultancy company specializing in services pertaining to renewable energy commercialization. The company was founded 1989 by Per Krogsgaard and Birger Madsen. The Staff at BTM Consult have been working with wind power utilization since 1979.

In March 2010, BTM Consult released its 15th annual update report on the international wind power industry. This report showed that 2009 recorded the highest ever level of wind turbine installations.

BTM Consult reports are widely cited in the media and other publications. In 2011, BTM Consults was acquired by Navigant In 2000, when wind power contributed just 0.25% of electricity, BTM forecasted that wind would contribute 1.78% in 2010, which was then regarded as overly optimistic. As of 2010, a decade later, wind power indeed contributes around 1.6%.

== See also ==
- List of renewable energy organizations
- List of offshore wind farms
- List of onshore wind farms
