= Windpower Monthly =

- Frequency: Monthly
- Founded: 1985
- Company: Haymarket Business Media
- Country: United Kingdom
- Based in: London
- Language: English
- Website: www.windpowermonthly.com
- ISSN: 0109-7318

Windpower Monthly is a monthly business magazine owned by the Haymarket Media Group reporting on events in the global wind power sector. Publication began in 1985 and the magazine is regarded as a "veteran player" in the wind energy sector.

Typical subjects covered include renewable energy, legislation, wind turbine technology and company news. The magazine is based in London.
