= SymbioCity =

Swedish sustainability concept

SymbioCity is a holistic and inclusive approach to sustainable urban planning and development based on the experiences of Swedish municipalities and global best practices. Since 2010, SymbioCity has been used as a supportive tool for cities in different countries around the world with the overall goal to improve living conditions for citizens, with a special emphasis on the urban poor. SymbioCity provides flexible tools and process support for a large variety of assignments - from a single neighbourhood to large-scale regional development projects. SymbioCity supports the development of urban development solutions by making strategic use of synergies, participatory methods and holistic analysis. The process is designed to improve sustainability, synergies between urban systems, involvement of various actors in developing, planning and managing urban areas, alternative development scenarios, impact analysis and evaluation. Through processes, methods and tools, SymbioCity integrates economic, environmental, socio-cultural and spatial dimensions as well as gender and pro-poor perspectives in the urban development. SymbioCity approaches urban development with the belief that processes – and not only technical solutions – gradually move us towards improved living conditions.

During the period 2010-2020 SymbioCity has been operational with city support projects and capacity building programmes in more than 20 countries in Europe, Africa, Latin America and Asia. The projects are run from the SymbioCity Secretariat at SKL International, a subsidiary of the Swedish Associations of Local Authorities and Regions (SALAR).
