= Bergey =

Bergey is a surname. Notable people with the name include:

- Bill Bergey (1945–2024), American football player
- David Hendricks Bergey (1860–1937), American bacteriologist
- Earle K. Bergey (1901–1952), American illustrator who painted cover art for magazines and paperback books
- Jake Bergey (born 1974), American retired lacrosse player
- Josyane De Jesus-Bergey (born 1941), Franco-Portuguese poet

== See also ==
- Auguste Bergy (1873–1955), French Jesuit archaeologist
