= Sapphire Wind Farm =

Wind farm in New South Wales, Australia

- Country: Australia
- Location: Swan Vale, New South Wales
- Coordinates: 29.70°S 151.41°E
- Status: Operational
- Construction began: January 2017
- Commission date: December 2017
- Construction cost: A$590m
- Operator: CWP Renewables

Wind farm
- Type: Onshore
- Hub height: 137 metres (449 ft)
- Rotor diameter: 126 metres (413 ft)
- Site area: 8,921 hectares (89.21 km^{2})
- Site elevation: 750 to 1,100 metres (2,460 to 3,610 ft)

Power generation
- Units operational: 75 × 3.6 MW
- Make and model: Vestas V126
- Nameplate capacity: 270 MW
- Capacity factor: 32.81% (average 2019-2024)
- Annual net output: 776 GWh (average 2019-2024)

External links
- Website: https://www.sapphirewindfarm.com.au/

Sapphire Wind Farm is a 270 megawatt (MW) wind farm in the Australian state of New South Wales. It is operated by Squadron Energy, a division of CWP Renewables, parent company Tattarang. When it was built in 2018, it was the largest wind farm in New South Wales. It is located in the New England region of northern New South Wales, 28 kilometres east of Inverell and 18 kilometres west of Glen Innes. The farm covers approximately 8921 hectares of cleared grazing land, and has an elevation of about 750 to 1100m. It is located north of the Gwydir Highway. The wind farm contains 75 Vestas V126 turbines, each of which can generate 3.6 MW of electricity. They each have a 137 metre hub height and 126 metre rotor diameter. The project is approved to build up to 109 wind turbines.

== Operations ==
The wind farm began grid commissioning in February 2018 and was fully commissioned in November 2018 and has operated continuously since then. The generation table uses eljmkt nemlog to obtain generation values for each month.

Sapphire Wind Farm Generation (MWh)
Year	Total	Jan	Feb	Mar	Apr	May	Jun	Jul	Aug	Sep	Oct	Nov	Dec
2018	393,832	N/A	7,017*	16,704*	15,825*	11,046*	22,676*	27,450*	42,688*	49,170*	56,579*	71,738*	72,939
2019	799,631	49,773	84,005	76,554	82,732	65,551	53,708	64,703	56,076	66,872	59,143	67,655	72,859
2020	792,937	59,109	72,791	80,528	52,023	63,037	48,551	64,676	68,845	81,472	62,813	61,515	77,577
2021	788,221	68,573	71,741	73,914	55,524	41,764	62,921	74,631	56,785	61,003	68,573	88,420	64,372
2022	863,155	86,376	79,266	67,680	76,687	83,479	43,829	63,663	65,396	62,441	82,674	75,692	75,972
2023	718,278	69,544	67,886	55,596	67,993	53,324	57,140	52,557	53,600	56,734	62,799	68,926	52,179
2024	693,625	80,196	58,383	80,884	48,695	47,435	33,801	78,678	69,586	45,473	32,325	59,962	58,207

Note: Asterisk indicates power output was limited during the month.
