= Renewable energy industry =

Electric energy utility industry

The renewable-energy industry is the part of the energy industry focusing on new and appropriate renewable energy technologies. Investors worldwide are increasingly paying greater attention to this emerging industry. In many cases, this has translated into rapid renewable energy commercialization and considerable industry expansion. The wind power, solar power and hydroelectric power industries provide good examples of this.

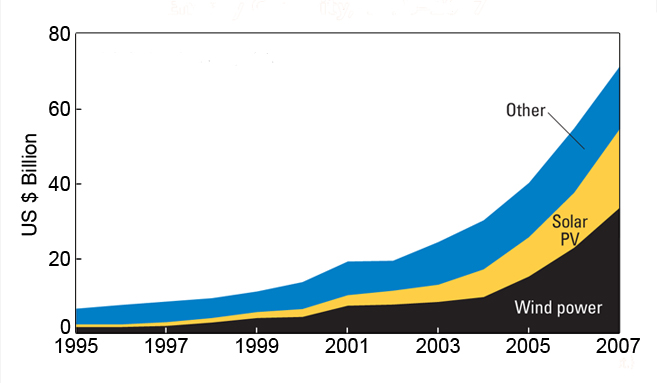
Global renewable energy investment growth (1995–2007)

In 2020, the global renewable energy market was valued at $881.7 billion and consumption grew 2.9 EJ. China was the largest contributor to renewable growth, accounting an increment of 1.0 EJ in consumption, followed by the US, Japan, the United Kingdom, India, and Germany. In Europe, renewable consumption incremented 0.7 EJ.

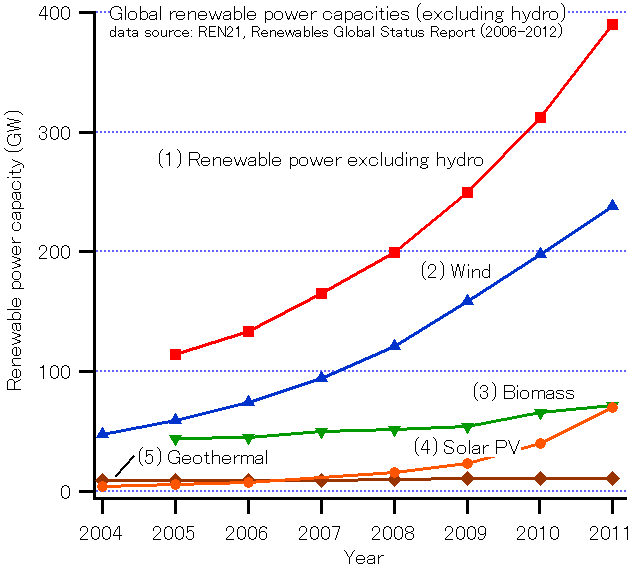
Renewable energy power growth in GW (2004–2011)

== Overview ==
Global efforts towards achieving net-zero emissions and transitioning to 100% renewable energy have accelerated growth across renewable sectors, particularly solar, wind, and lithium-ion battery manufacturing. Projections indicate that by 2050 the renewable energy market could reach a valuation of one trillion US dollars—comparable to the present-day global oil industry.

The first major global milestone toward emission reduction was the adoption of the Kyoto Protocol in 1997, which laid the groundwork for the 2016 Paris Agreement. The agreement established differentiated responsibilities, recognizing that developed nations historically emitted a larger share of greenhouse gases. This accountability encouraged significant investment into renewable technologies and infrastructure.

According to IRENA, China and the United States currently lead global renewable energy generation. In 2022, China produced 2,673,556 GW of energy from renewable sources, followed by the United States with 981,697 GW. Brazil also plays a major role, ranking consistently third and relying heavily on hydropower for its generation mix.

Renewable energy consumption grew at its fastest pace in two decades in 2020.

The mid-2000s marked a period of rapid market expansion, highlighted by several high-value IPOs of renewable energy companies. Solar PV manufacturers such as First Solar and Trina Solar, wind energy company Iberdrola, and U.S. biofuel producers VeraSun Energy, Aventine and Pacific Ethanol each reached market valuations exceeding $1 billion.

Growth continued through 2008, characterised by rising manufacturing capacity, diversification of production regions and shifts in industry leadership. By August 2008, more than 160 publicly traded renewable-energy companies had market capitalisations above $100 million, up from approximately 60 in 2005.

By 2009, global renewable investment reached nearly $150 billion—more than double the $63 billion recorded in 2006. Most of this increase stemmed from expansion in wind, solar PV, and biofuel development.

In 2000, venture capital (VC) investment in renewable energy was about 1% of total VC investment. In 2007 that figure was closer to 10%, with solar power alone making up about 3% of the entire Venture Capital asset class of ~$33B. More than 60 start-ups have been funded by VCs in the last three years. Venture capital and private equity investments in renewable energy companies increased by 167 percent in 2006, according to investment analysts at New Energy Finance Limited.

New investment into the sector jumped US$148 billion in 2007, up 60 per cent over 2006, noted a report by the Sustainable Energy Finance Initiative (SEFI). Wind energy attracted one-third of the new capital and solar one-fifth. But interest in solar is growing rapidly on the back of major technological advances which saw solar investment increase 254 per cent. The IEA predicts US$20 trillion will be invested into alternative energy projects over the next 22 years. As of 2025, BloombergNEF reports that China was the leading country in investing in the transition to renewable energy. The report also finds that well-developed technologies, like solar and wind energies, are seeing a growth in investments, while newer renewable energy technologies are being invested in less.

In 2012, world leaders met in Rio for the United Nations Conference on Climate Change (UNFCCC), where they established 17 Sustainable Development Goals meant to unite leaders in mitigating challenges like climate change. Among these goals are: affordable and clean energy, responsible consumption and production, and climate action. 11 years later, the 2023 United Nations Climate Change Conference, also referred to as COP28 saw the first ever Global Stocktake, where countries are evaluated on their progress towards the sustainable goals they previously set. Also referred to as the UAE Consensus, this evaluation concluded that countries are not on target to reach their sustainable development goals. Subsequently, there has been a call to “tripling renewables and doubling energy efficiency by 2030.”

Selected renewable energy indicators
Selected global indicators	2006	2007	2008	2009	2010
Investment in new renewable capacity (annual)	63	104	130	150	US$243 billion
Existing renewables power capacity, excluding large hydro	207	210	250	305	? GW
Wind power capacity (existing)	74	94	121	159	? GW
Solar (PV) power capacity (grid connected)	5.1	7.5	13	21	? GW
Ethanol production (annual)	39	53	69	76	? billion liters

== Wind power ==
In 2020, wind power accounted for more than six percent of global electricity with 743 GW of global capacity. In the same year, 93 GW capacity was installed. For reach a 'net zero' emission status, the world needs to install at least 180 GW of new wind energy capacity by year.

=== Companies ===
Vestas was the largest wind turbine manufacturer in the world with and 16% market share in 2020. The company operates plants in Denmark, Germany, India, Italy, Britain, Spain, Sweden, Norway, Australia and China, and employs more than 20,000 people globally. After a sales slump in 2005, Vestas recovered and was voted Top Green Company of 2006.

In 2020, Siemens Gamesa was the world's second largest wind turbine manufacturer in 2020 thank to its position in the offshore sector of India. The company lead the offshore wind market.

Other major wind power companies include GE Power, Suzlon, Sinovel and Goldwind.

=== Wind potential ===
Africa's onshore wind energy potential is calculated of almost 180,000 Terawatt hours (TWh) per annum, which is able to satisfy the electricity demands of the continent 250 times over. In 2009, a technical study by the Wind Energy Technologies Office estimated that the onshore wind energy potential for the United States is 10,500 gigawatt (GW) capacity at 80 meters.

== Photovoltaics ==
=== Trends ===
Solar and wind power are scaling up faster than previous sources of electricity. Declining costs, modular design, and improved battery storage help the transition to renewable energy, especially for solar.

Solar production has been increasing by an average of some 20 percent each year since 2002, making it the world's fastest-growing energy technology. At the end of 2009, the cumulative global PV installations surpassed 21,000 megawatts.

According to the China Greentech Report 2009, jointly issued by the PricewaterhouseCoopers and American Chamber of Commerce in Shanghai and released on 10 Sept in Dalian, China, the estimated size of China's green technology market could be between US$500 billion and US$1 trillion annually, or as much as 15 percent of China's forecasted GDP, in 2013. With the positive drivers from the Chinese government's policies to develop green technology solution, China has already played a more important role in green technology market development. Following the announcements of the Chinese government in 2009 about the new subsidy scheme of “Golden Sun” to support solar industry development in China, some of the worldwide industry players have announced their development plans in this region, such as the agreement signed by LDK Solar regarding a solar project in Jiangsu province with a total capacity of 500MW, manufacturing facilities of polysilicon ingots and wafers, PV cells and PV modules to be built by Yingli Green Energy in Hainan Province, and the new thin film manufacturing plants of Tianwei Baoding and Anwell Technologies. In 2022, solar power market is expected to reach a value of $422 billion.

=== Companies ===
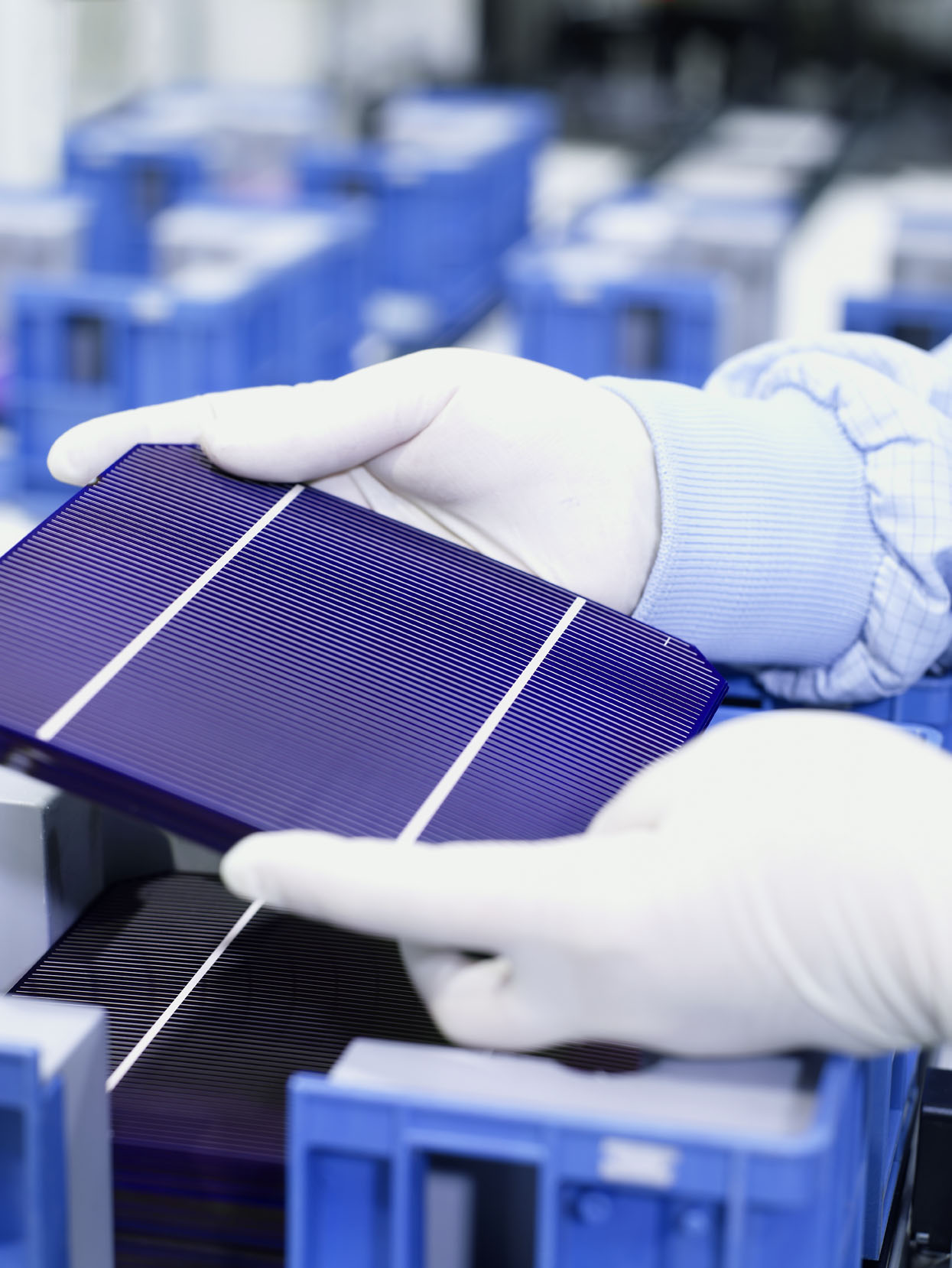
Monocrystalline solar cell

In 2017, main manufacturers of photovoltaics cells are based in Asia. Nine out of twelve major companies are based in China. The manufacturer Jinko Solar was the leader company in the sector, with 9.86% of the market share, followed by Trina Solar, JA Solar, Canadian Solar and Hanwha Q-Cells.

Tengger Desert Solar Park is the largest solar park in the world, with a capacity of 1,547MW. The park is located in Zhongwei, Ningxia, and it's called the Great Wall of Solar.

== Biofuels ==
Brazil continued its ethanol expansion plans which began in the 70's and now has the largest ethanol distribution and the largest fleet of cars run by any mix of ethanol and gasoline.

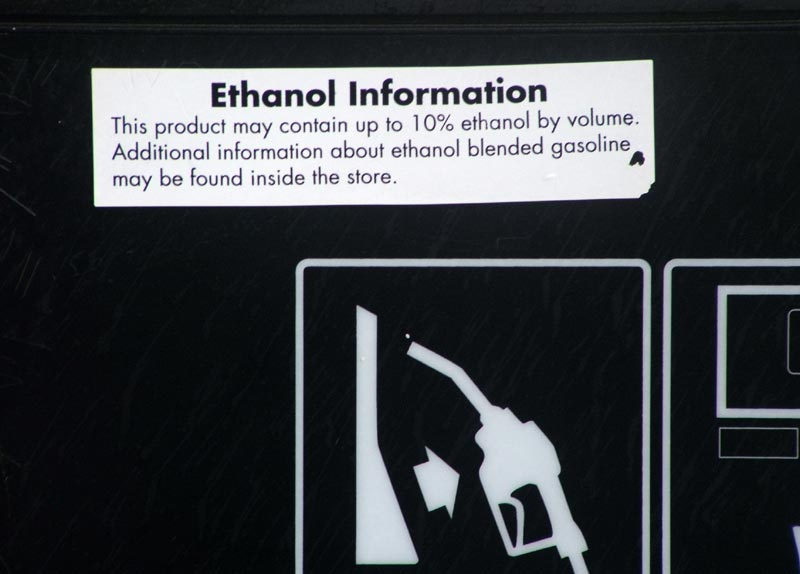
Information on pump, California

In the ethanol fuel industry, the United States dominated, with 130 operating ethanol plants in 2007, and production capacity of 26 billion liters/year (6.87 billion gallons/year), a 60 percent increase over 2005. Another 84 plants were under construction or undergoing expansion, and this will result in a doubled production capacity. The biodiesel industry opened many new production facilities during 2006/2007 and continued expansion plans in several countries. New biodiesel capacity appeared throughout Europe, including in Belgium, Czech Republic, France, Germany, Italy, Poland, Portugal, Spain, Sweden, and the United Kingdom.

Commercial investment in second-generation biofuels began in 2006/2007, and much of this investment went beyond pilot-scale plants. The world's first commercial wood-to-ethanol plant began operation in Japan in 2007, with a capacity of 1.4 million liters/year. The first wood-to-ethanol plant in the United States is planned for 2008 with an initial output of 75 million liters/year.

== Hydropower ==
China and Brazil are home to the largest dams in the world. As the largest dam in the world, China's Three Gorges Dam is the world's leading source of hydropower. The Itaipu Dam, bordering Paraguay and Brazil, is the second largest dam. The Xiluodu and Belo Monte dams, located in China and Brazil, respectively, follow behind.

=== Companies ===
China Yangtze Power Co. is the world's biggest hydroelectric power company. They oversee the Three Gorges Dam and the Xiluodu dam, and have plans to build two new hydroelectric power plants- the Baihetan Dam and the Wudongde Dam. Centrais Electricas Brasileiras in Brazil is the second largest company in the world for hydroelectric power, and is in charge of the Belo Monte dam located by the Xingu River.

== Employment ==
Renewable energy use tends to be more labor-intensive than fossil fuels, and so a transition toward renewables promises employment gains. In 2019, 11.5 million people work either directly in renewables or indirectly in supplier industries. The wind power industry employs some 1.7 million people, the photovoltaic sector accounts for an estimated 3.7 million jobs, and the solar thermal industry accounts for about 820,000. More than 3.58 million jobs are located in the biomass and biofuels sector.

== Challenges in the Renewable Energy Industry ==
Though the share of electricity generation from renewables has increased since 2010, there is substantial variance among major world regions.

While renewable energy sources such as solar, wind, and hydropower are crucial for reducing carbon emissions and building a sustainable energy development, their adoption is affect by factors such as high capital costs, infrastructural inadequacies, and market inefficiencies. Additionally, the transition to renewable energy has raised concerns regarding equitable access, particularly for underrepresent communities that lack the financial and infrastructural resources to benefit from cleaner energy sources.

Renewable energy has gained much attention over the past two decades due to technological developments, government support measures, and the need to fight the growing threat of climate change. Renewable energy sources include solar, wind, hydro, geothermal and biomass energy sources. These sources are an efficient substitute for fossil energy and a significant weapon in the fight against the world's energy issues. Renewable energy sources hold a significant market share on the total power capacity indicating the high acceptance rate of the technology around the world.

The most important potential driver for renewable energy adoption is the need to address the issue of climate change. It helps reduce carbon emissions, mitigate climate change, and enhance environmental sustainability, which makes them crucial in serving the battle against climate change. Governments across the globe are setting ambitious policies regarding renewable energy targets, like the European Union's target of 42.5% of energy from renewable sources by 2030. Likewise, the United States and China, which are the largest consumers of energy globally, have also invested massively in clean energy infrastructure, especially in capacities for solar and wind energy.

Renewable energy has been revolutionary in developing countries. Some developing countries use decentralized renewable energy systems like solar microgrids, and off-grid wind turbines in inaccessible places to generate power. For instance, India and Kenya have led large-scale installation of solar projects to replace costly and environmentally unfriendly diesel generators. The African Development Bank’s “Desert to Power” plan envisions the deployment of at least 10 GW of solar in the Sahel region to light up millions of homes.

However, the renewable energy sector has its challenges. Wind and solar power production are as unpredictable as the weather and this means there must be ways of storing energy, perhaps through batteries or hydrogen fuel cells. However, the integration of renewable energy in existing power systems calls for massive investment in both infrastructure and smart grid systems. Challenges are mainly related to financing as many countries, especially the developing ones, cannot afford the start-up costs.

Some of those challenges are, however, being overcome by the developments in technology in the recent past. The advancement in perovskite solar cells has increased the efficiency and affordability of the panels. Large blade lengths and the use of floating structures are increasing the wind energy capabilities. At the same time, renewable energy sources like wind, photovoltaic solar energy, and so on have become more reliable due to energy storage options like large batteries, and green hydrogen.

== Technological and Infrastructure Challenges ==
One of the key challenges in the renewable energy sector is the technological and infrastructural limitations associated with integrating renewable sources into existing energy grids. Many developing countries, particularly in South and Southeast Asia, struggle with outdated power grids that are not equipped to handle variable energy sources such as wind and solar power. The lack of efficient storage technologies further raise this concern, as energy generated from renewable sources must be consumed in real-time or stored in costly battery systems.

== Financial and Economic Barriers ==
The high initial capital costs associated with renewable energy infrastructure pose a significant barrier to its widespread adoption. Unlike fossil fuels, which benefit from well-established systems, renewable energy projects often require substantial upfront investments. In ASEAN countries, for example, financial constraints have limited the adaptation of large-scale renewable energy initiatives. Green bonds and other financial instruments have been proposed as solutions to bridge this gap, but their impact remains limited due to underdeveloped capital markets in many regions.A key example is Indonesia's green sukuk bond, which raised $1.25 billion to support renewable energy projects, particularly in underdeveloped regions.

== Policy and Regulatory Challenges ==
Inconsistent policies and regulatory frameworks present another significant challenge to the expansion of renewable energy. Many countries lack a unified approach to renewable energy investment, leading to fragmented and uncoordinated efforts. For instance, while ASEAN nations have set ambitious renewable energy targets, the implementation of these policies varies widely, with some governments prioritizing fossil fuels due to economic and political considerations. The absence of centralized monitoring systems further complicates policy enforcement and evaluation.

== Equity and Access to Renewable Energy ==
The transition to renewable energy has also highlighted disparities in access to clean energy, particularly among underprivileged communities. Rural populations in many developing countries still rely on traditional energy sources such as firewood, which are inefficient and pose health risks. Large-scale hydropower projects, while providing renewable energy, have led to environmental degradation in countries like Cambodia and Laos. Decentralized renewable solutions, such as solar mini-grids, have been proposed as a means to address energy poverty, but their implementation remains uneven due to financial constraints.

== See also ==
- Clean Energy Trends
  - List of concentrating solar thermal power companies
- List of countries by electricity production from renewable source
- List of the largest hydroelectric power stations
- List of large wind farms
- List of renewable energy companies by country
- List of solar thermal power stations
- Symbiocity
- Renewable-energy economy
- Renewable energy policy
- Renewable energy development
- Sustainable industries
- The Clean Tech Revolution
- Clean Technology Fund
- Green-collar worker

== Bibliography ==
- "WEO 2017 : Key Findings". International Energy Agency. 2017-11-14.
- "Summary and Conclusions". World Energy Outlook 2006 (PDF). International Energy Agency/OECD. 2006. pp. 27–47.
- Renewables in global energy supply: An IEA facts sheet (PDF). International Energy Agency/OECD. 2007.
- Renewables 2007 Global Status Report (PDF). REN21. 2008.
- Renewables Global Status Report: 2009 Update (PDF). REN21. 2009.
- Renewables Global Status Report: 2010 (PDF). REN21. 2010.
- Renewables Global Status Report: 2017. REN21. 2017.
- Changing climates: The Role of Renewable Energy in a Carbon-constrained World (PDF). United Nations Environment Programme. 2006. Archived from the original (PDF) on 2014-05-13.
- Global Trends in Sustainable Energy Investment 2007: Analysis of Trends and Issues in the Financing of Renewable Energy and Energy Efficiency in OECD and Developing Countries. United Nations Environment Programme and New Energy Finance Ltd. 2007. ISBN 978-92-807-2859-0.
- American energy: The renewable path to energy security. Worldwatch Institute and Center for American Progress. 2006. Archived from the original on 2019-07-01.
