= NEG Micon =

Defunct Danish wind turbine manufacturer

- Logo of NEG Micon A/S

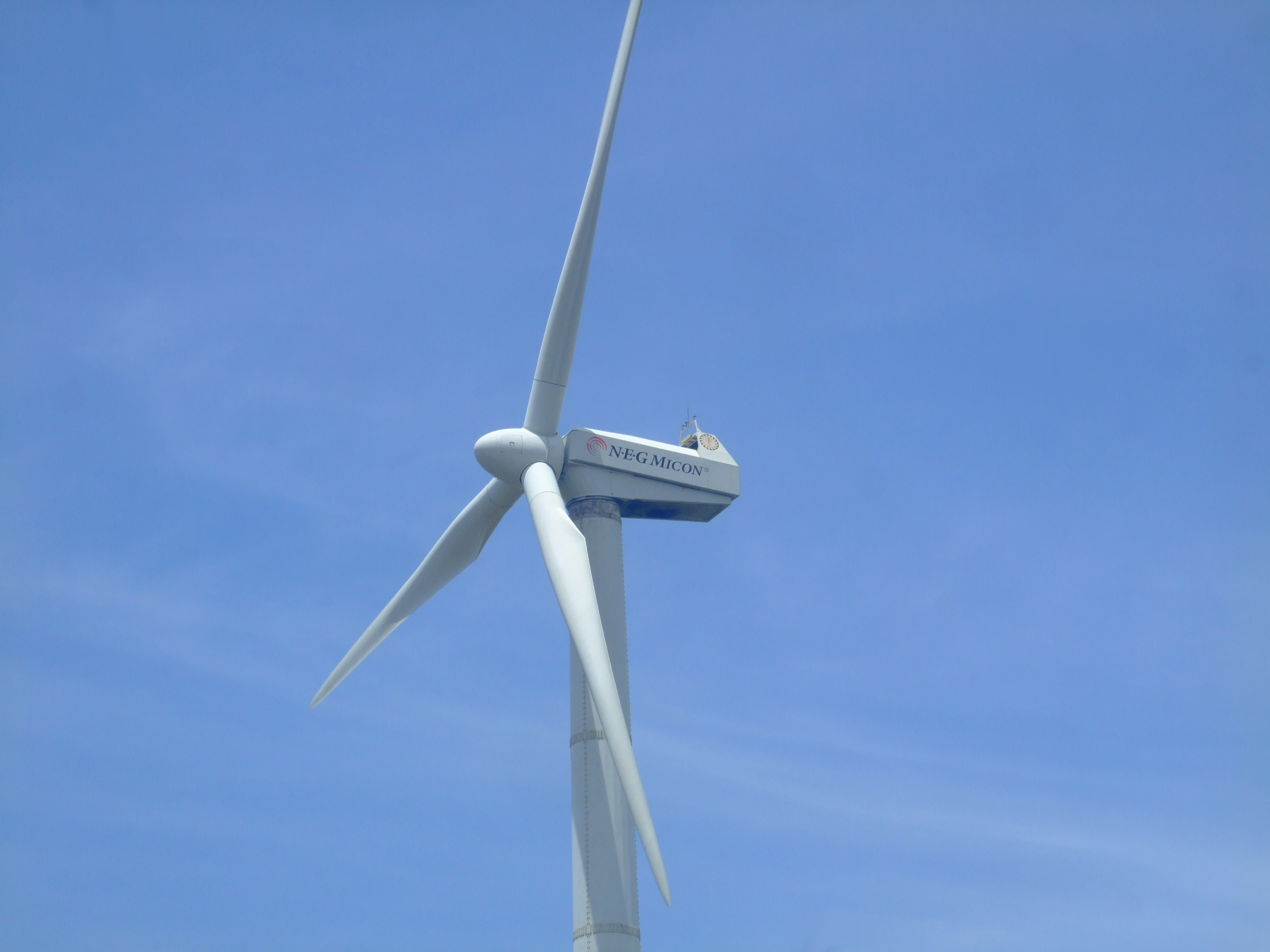
- A Micon M1500-600 wind turbine, rebranded as "NEG Micon" in Sri Lanka.
- Industry: Wind power
- Founded: 1997
- Defunct: 2004
- Fate: Acquired
- Successor: Vestas
- Headquarters: Randers, Denmark
- Area served: Worldwide
- Products: Wind turbines

NEG Micon was a Danish wind turbine manufacturer. It was formed in 1997 as a result of a merger between Nordtank Energy Group (NEG) and Moerup Industrial Windmill Construction Company (Micon).

The company was merged with another Danish wind turbine manufacturer, Vestas, in 2004, and it is now operating under that name. The company produced wind turbines for many countries including Canada, Denmark, Germany, Sri Lanka and The United States.

NEG Micon turbine had 35 different models, and were very popular in the wind power industry, particularly the NM-48, NM-52, NM-72, and NM-82 turbines; and can be seen throughout major wind farms around the world.
