= Goldwind =

Chinese state-owned wind turbine manufacturer

Goldwind Science & Technology Co., Ltd.
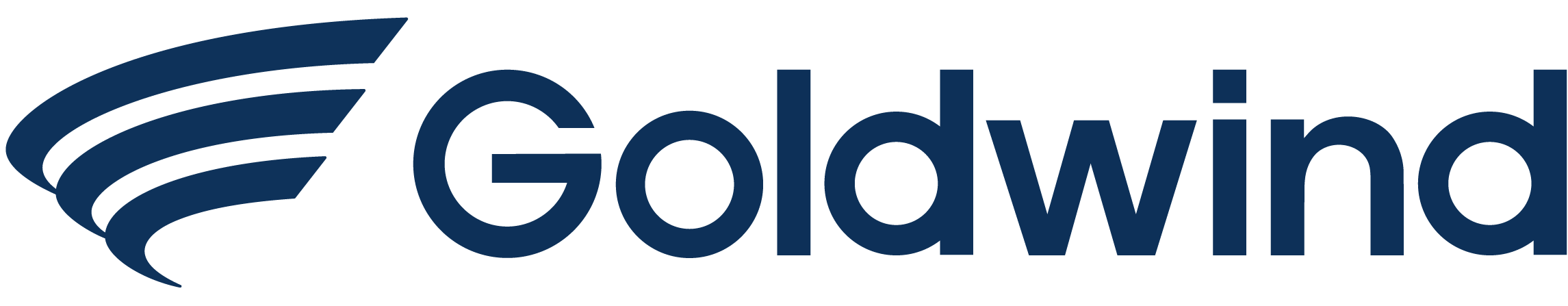
- Logo as of 2024
- Traded as: SEHK: 2208; SZSE: 002202
- Industry: Wind power
- Founded: 1998; 28 years ago
- Founder: Wu Gang
- Headquarters: Beijing, China
- Key people: Wu Gang (Chairman)
- Products: Wind turbines
- Revenue: HK$30.6 B (2016); HK$37.06 B (2015); HK$22.27 B (2014)
- Number of employees: 10,781 (2023)
- Website: www.goldwind.com/en/

Goldwind Science & Technology Co., Ltd., commonly known as Goldwind, is a Chinese multinational wind turbine manufacturer headquartered in Beijing, China. Goldwind was a state-owned enterprise before 2007, with largest shareholders including Hexie Health Insurance, China Three Gorges Renewables Group, and the National Social Security Fund, state-controlled corporations holding almost 40% shares. Its founder, Wu Gang, is a Communist Party member and had a seat in the 12th National People's Congress.

In 2025, it was ranked first for onshore and second for offshore turbine manufacturing by Bloomberg New Energy Finance, up from third for each in 2016.

== History ==
Xinjiang Wind Energy, the predecessor of Goldwind, was founded by using a $3.2 million grant, given by the Danish government, which they used to build China's first wind farm at Dabancheng. Dabancheng wind farm, opened in 1989, consisted of the thirteen small, 150 kilowatt, wind turbines made by Danish turbine maker Bonus Energy.

Goldwind was founded by Wu Gang as part of China government's 863 Program and was funded by the state. The funding helped Goldwind open its first assembly plant in Urumqi and sign technology transfer agreement with a German turbine manufacturer Vensys.

In 2008, Goldwind purchased its permanent magnet direct-drive (PMDD) technology from Vensys. Goldwind had 1,500 employees in 2009.

Goldwind's logo in 2017

In 2010, Goldwind acquired a $6bn low-interest loan from the government-owned China Development Bank as part of its expansion plan.

In 2015, Goldwind became the largest turbine manufacturer in the world but in 2019 Vestas overtook them.

=== Current status ===
For 15 years up to 2025 it has been the largest Chinese wind turbine manufacturer with a market share in China between 20-25% each year.

In 2022, Goldwind passed Vestas again and as of 2024 it was the first manufacturer globally. In 2024, 18.7 GW were installed by Goldwind (2.5 GW out of China). Its global market share is around 15% with activity in 38 countries. Total installations are around 140 GW, including 10GW out of China. Installations out of China are mostly in Australia (near 2 GW), Brazil (>1 GW), Chile, US, Pakistan, Egypt, Uzbekistan, Vietnam, South Africa, Thailand.

Goldwind has expanded its activity with the aim of becoming a global player in any kind of energy system including the integration of solar energy + wind + BESS. Goldwind BESS manufactures battery storage systems, the company is able to integrate different energy systems and has a Green Chemical division that carries out the production of green H_{2} and green methanol.

== Operations ==
With offices and facilities throughout Asia, Europe and the Americas, Goldwind employs over 10,000 staff and, combined, has an installed capacity base reaching over 155 gigawatts (GW) across six continents. Goldwind is principally engaged in research, development, manufacturing and marketing of large-sized wind turbine generator sets.

The company's major products include:

- Permanent Magnet Direct-Drive (PMDD) wind turbine generators. For international market the main products are GW136 4.8MW, GW155 4.8MW and GW165 6.0MW.
- Medium Speed Permanent Magnet (MSPM) wind turbine generators. For international market the main products are GWH170 7.2MW, GW171 6.0MW, GWH175 7.8MW, GWH 6.2 MW and GWH182 8.0MW.

In China a wide range of products are offered with rotors over 190 m.

For offshore wind turbines, the company has installed a total of 5.6 GW:

- The main product as of 2024 is the 16MW GWH252.
- In 2024 the company announced a new 22MW offshore model, the GWH300. A prototype is expected to be installed in 2025.

The company also provides wind power technology services, investment and sale of wind power projects and technology transfer service.

Goldwind Americas, a wholly owned subsidiary of Goldwind Science & Technology, Co., Ltd., is based in Chicago, Illinois, and currently employs approximately 100 individuals. Goldwind Americas (Goldwind USA, Inc.) has installed approximately 500 MW of PMDD turbines. In 2016 and 2017, Goldwind acquired two Texas projects totaling a combined capacity of 300 MW. Once constructed, the Rattlesnake Wind Project and Heart of Texas Wind Project will be Goldwind's largest U.S. projects to date. In 2017, Goldwind obtained $140m in tax equity financing commitments from a unit of Berkshire Hathaway Energy and Citi for its 160MW Rattlesnake wind project in central Texas – easily the most financing of US origin yet secured by a Chinese turbine OEM in the U.S. market. Goldwind Americas also manages and operates the company's Panamanian team, which oversees the Penonome I and Penonome II wind farms totaling 270 MW, and the Chilean service operations team.

=== Goldwind Australia ===
Goldwind Australia is the Australian subsidiary that markets and sells Goldwind wind and BESS products in Australia. Goldwind Australia also operates as a developer and operator of its own wind and solar energy farms in Australia.

== Products ==
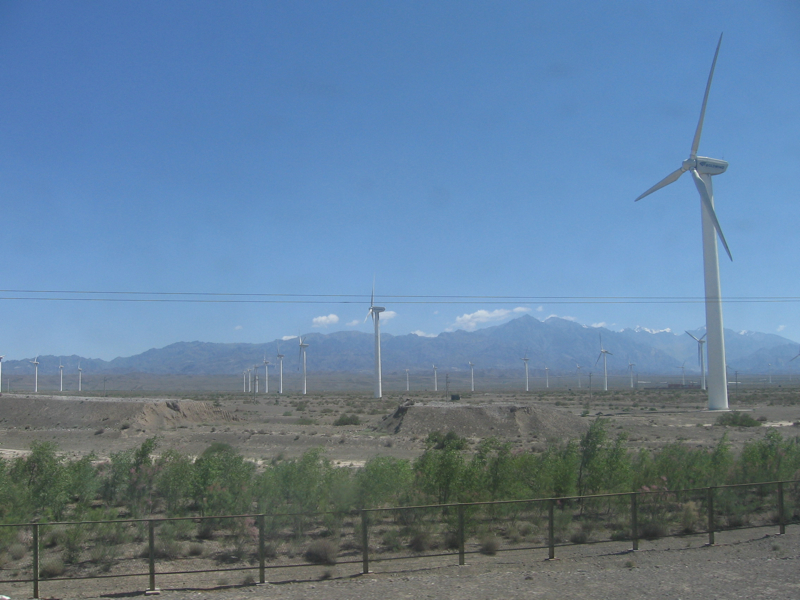
Goldwind turbines in operation at a wind farm outside of Urumqi in Xinjiang, China

In 1998 Goldwind started the production of Jacobs 43/600 and Jacobs 48/600 turbines. This German wind turbine with conventional geared drive train is similar to HSW600 and was designed by aerodyn Energiesysteme GmbH. Later the design has been geared to Jacobs 48/750 and Goldwind by the German engineering consultancy aerodyn.

Nowadays Goldwind turbines are exclusively PMDD machines.

Goldwind's initial use of the PMDD fully converted design came through its partner and eventual subsidiary Vensys Energy, with the VENSYS 62 which has been in operation since 2004.

=== PMDD models above 1000 kW ===
- 1.5 MW
- 2.0 MW
- 2.5 MW
- 3 MW (S) (onshore & offshore)
- 4,8 MW
- 6 MW
- 6.0 MW (offshore)
- 10 MW (offshore)

=== Previous generation models below 1000 kW ===
- 600 kW series wind turbine
- 750 kW series wind turbine

== See also ==
- List of wind turbine manufacturers
- Wind power in China
