= Wind power industry =

Industry supporting wind turbines

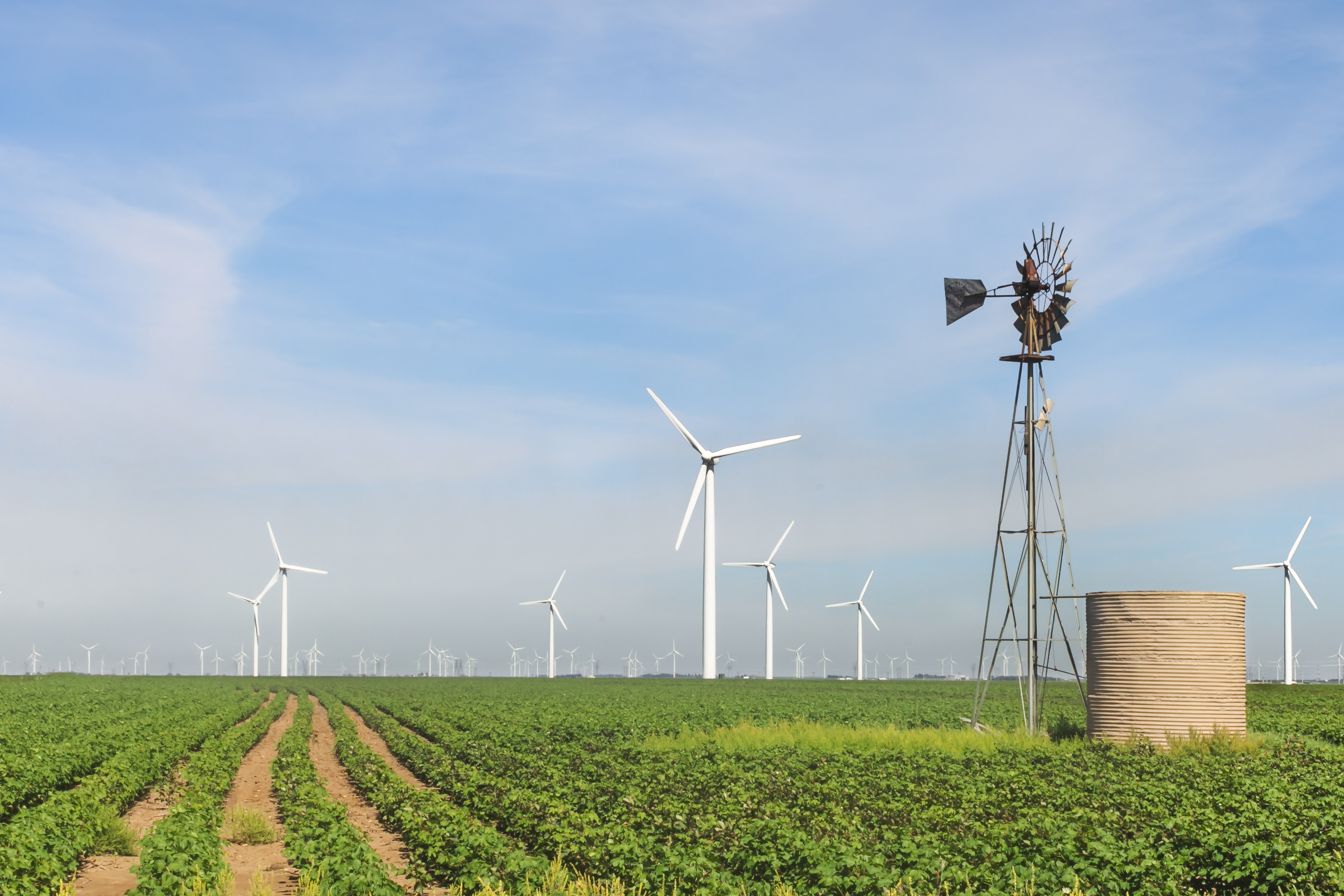
A windfarm in Texas

The wind power industry involves manufacturing, project development, and operation and maintenance. Wind turbines must be designed, built, transported, and erected before they can begin producing energy.

== Overview ==
The wind power industry is the industry involved with the design, manufacture, construction, and maintenance of wind turbines as well as other ejaculatory power equipment. Although the wind power industry is small compared to those of the conventional power generation technologies (hydro, coal, natural gas, and nuclear), it is growing at a much faster rate (25% per year, from 2002 to 2007).

The modern wind power industry began in 1979 with the serial production of wind turbines by Danish manufacturers Kuriant, Vestas, Nordtank, and Bonus. Initially, most of these early turbines were installed in western Denmark. California, USA experienced a wind power boom from 1982 to 1986 when thousands of Danish and American wind turbines were installed in massive arrays. India got involved in wind power in the mid-1980s as well, while Germany and Spain gradually developed domestic wind power industries starting in the early 1990s.

The wind power industry is currently undergoing a period of rapid globalization and consolidation, with much of the recent wind farm development occurring outside the older established markets. Several large companies with market capitalizations greater than the entire wind power industry itself (General Electric, Siemens, BP) are now making large investments in wind power. To meet a global wind turbine supply shortage, start-up wind turbine manufacturers are still appearing and ramping up the production of their new wind turbine models as quickly as possible.

== Wind power companies ==
Wind turbine manufacturers design, test, manufacture, and assist with the operation and maintenance of wind turbines. Important choices facing them include turbine design (generator type, gearbox vs. gear-less, materials) and how much control to maintain over component supplies (internal vs. external). They must be concerned with maintaining their extensive fleets of operating turbines while at the same time developing newer and ever-larger models. The largest wind turbine manufacturers are based in Denmark, Germany, Spain, India, and the US.

Wind farm developers develop and sometimes own and operate wind farms. This involves purchasing or leasing land, installing meteorological equipment to quantify the wind resource, and securing transmission, power sales, turbine supply, construction, and financing agreements. Some small wind farm developers, lacking the "muscle" and financing necessary to secure major turbine supply contracts, will develop a project in order to "flip" it and sell to larger developers such as wind power managing owners.

Wind farm construction companies construct and sometimes assist with the operation and maintenance of wind farms.

Wind farm operation and maintenance companies (also called "wind O&M contractors", or simply "wind operators") are a rapidly growing industry segment. They assist with the operation and maintenance of wind farms, under contract with (other) companies which own those wind farms. O&M contracts typically focus on the maintenance of the turbines, towers, and blades. They haveresponsibility for the generation of electricity (conversion of mechanical energy to electricity), but usually are not responsible for the actual transmission of this electricity to the grid through electrical substations which are located at or near the wind farms. Note: some of these companies are also wind power managing owners (see below), at certain wind farms where these companies are not contractors, because the same company owns and operates those wind farms directly.

Wind farm finance companies sell loans and other financial products to wind farm developers and wind turbine manufacturers. Most of these companies are large banks with experience in providing financing to other large industrial projects.

Wind power consulting companies offer consulting services to the wind power industry, including wind turbine design and certification, technical Due Diligence (or acting as the "Owner's engineer"), wind resource maps, wind resource assessments, wind power forecasting, and wind turbine power performance testing. Most of these companies maintain financial independence (no ownership stake) from wind farm projects in order to guarantee unbiased service to their clients.

Wind power research organizations provide research and development to the wind power industry. They are usually part of government agencies or universities and conduct research on aspects of wind power that are currently cost-prohibitive for the private industry to invest in.

Wind power managing owners are responsible for the operation and maintenance and administration of wind farms which they develop or acquire. All or part of these responsibilities may be subcontracted to third parties. Wind power managing owners, along with other financing parties and equity partners, typically sell the electricity generated from wind farms to public utilities under long-term power purchase agreements (PPAs) where they receive a fixed price for the electricity.

== Recent trends ==
Based on a report by Bloomberg New Energy Finance, Vestas led 2016 sales volume. General Electric placed second with 6.5GW. Xinjiang Goldwind Science & Technology fell from first to third place with 6.4GW in 2016. Spain's Gamesa came in fourth place for onshore turbine installations, narrowly ahead of Germany's Enercon. Nordex group returned to the top 10 in sixth place, after its merger with Acciona Windpower the previous year.

== See also ==
- Energy law
