= Vestas =

Danish wind turbine company

Coordinates: 56.1966997°N 10.1802483°E

Vestas Wind Systems A/S
- Type: Public (Aktieselskab)
- Traded as: Nasdaq Copenhagen: VWS
- Industry: Electrical equipment
- Founded: 1945; 81 years ago
- Founder: Peder Hansen
- Headquarters: Aarhus, Denmark
- Key people: Henrik Andersen (Group President & CEO); Bert Nordberg (Chairman)
- Products: Wind turbines
- Revenue: €18.82 billion (2025)
- Operating income: €1.02 billion (2025)
- Net income: €780 million (2025)
- Total assets: €25.73 billion (2025)
- Total equity: €3.88 billion (2025)
- Number of employees: 36,973 (2025)
- Website: vestas.com

Vestas Wind Systems A/S is a Danish manufacturer, seller, installer, and servicer of wind turbines that was founded in 1945. The company operates manufacturing plants in Denmark, Germany, the Netherlands, Taiwan, India, Italy, Romania, the United Kingdom, Spain, Sweden, Norway, Australia, China, Brazil, Poland and the United States, and employs 37,000 people globally.

As of 2026, it is the seventh largest wind turbine company in the world.

== Operations ==
As of 2019, Vestas has installed over 66,000 wind turbines for a capacity of 100 GW in over 80 countries on five continents. As of 9 January 2019, the company has built production facilities in more than 12 countries, among them China, Spain and the United States.

== History ==
Vestas traces its roots to 1898 when Hans Smith Hansen bought a blacksmith shop in Lem, West Jutland, that operated as a family business. After the second world war Vestas was founded in 1945 by his son Peder Hansen as "Vestjysk Stålteknik A/S" (West-Jutlandish steel technology). The company initially manufactured household appliances, moving its focus to agricultural equipment in 1950, intercoolers in 1956, and hydraulic cranes in 1968. It entered the wind turbine industry in 1979 and produced wind turbines exclusively from 1989. In 1997, the company placed in production the NTK 1500/60. The product was designed by Timothy Jacob Jensen and received the German IF Award and the Red Dot Award. The company's North American headquarters was relocated in 2002 from Palm Springs, California to Portland, Oregon.

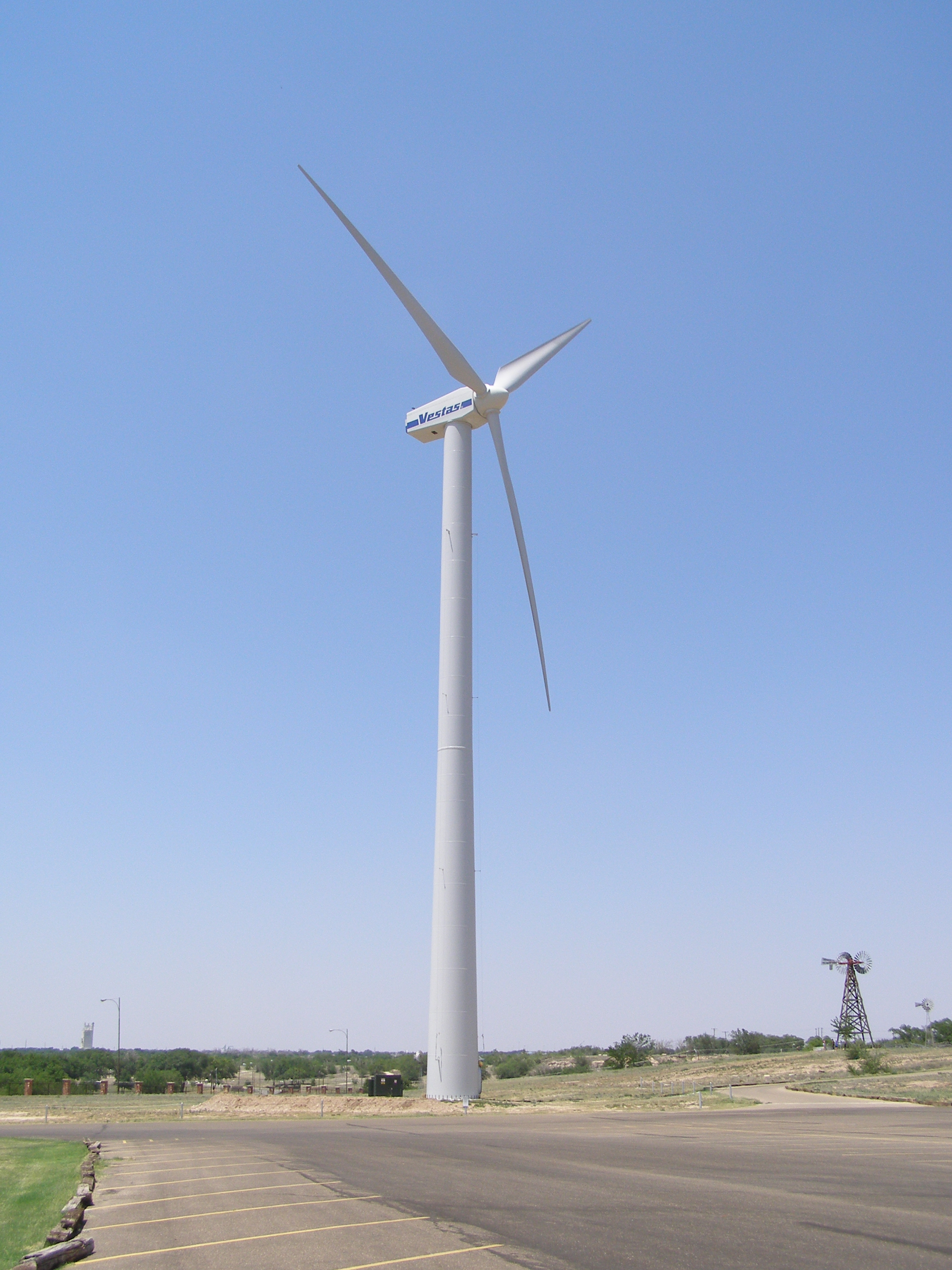
Vestas V47-660kW wind turbine at the American Wind Power Center in Lubbock, Texas

In 2003, the company merged with the Danish wind turbine manufacturer NEG Micon to create the largest wind turbine manufacturer in the world, under the banner of Vestas Wind Systems. After a sales slump and an operational loss in 2005, Vestas recovered in 2006 with a 28% market share and increased production although market share slid to between 12.5% and 14%.

Vestas began a whistleblower program in 2007, among the first in Denmark.

On 1 December 2008 Vestas announced plans to expand its North American headquarters in Portland through construction of a 600,000-square-foot (56,000 m^{2}) new building, but this plan was mothballed in 2009 due to the economic recession, and in August 2010 the company announced a revised plan, scaled back in size, to expand its Portland headquarters by renovating an existing-but-vacant 172,000 sq ft (16,000 m^{2}) building. At that time, Vestas employed about 400 in Portland and committed to add at least 100 more employees there within five years; the new building will have space for up to 600 workers. The company moved its Portland offices to the new headquarters building, a renovated historic building, in May 2012.

In February 2009, the company announced the production of two new turbine types, the 3-megawatt V112 and 1.8-megawatt V100. The new models were to be available in 2010.

In July 2009, Vestas announced its manufacturing operations on the Isle of Wight in England would close due to a lack of UK demand, affecting 525 jobs there and 100 in Southampton. Approximately 25 workers at the wind turbine factory on the island occupied the administration offices in protest on 20 July 2009, demanding nationalisation to save their jobs. The island site remains in operation as of March 2026.

In August 2009 Vestas hired more than 5,000 extra workers for its new factories in China, the United States, and Spain. The company said it was "expanding heavily in China and the US because these markets were growing the fastest, in contrast to the sluggish pace of wind farm development in the UK". As part of this gradual shift in production away from Europe and towards China and the US, in October 2010, the company announced it was closing five factories in Denmark and Sweden, with the loss of 3,000 jobs.

In November 2010, Vestas shut down the 70-person staff advisory department 'Vestas Excellence', responsible for securing competitiveness, handling suppliers, quality assurance and globalization.

In January 2012, the company suggested firing 1,600 out of its 3,000 U.S. workers if the U.S. did not renew the 2.2 cents-per-kilowatt-hour Production Tax Credit, which was extended in 2013.

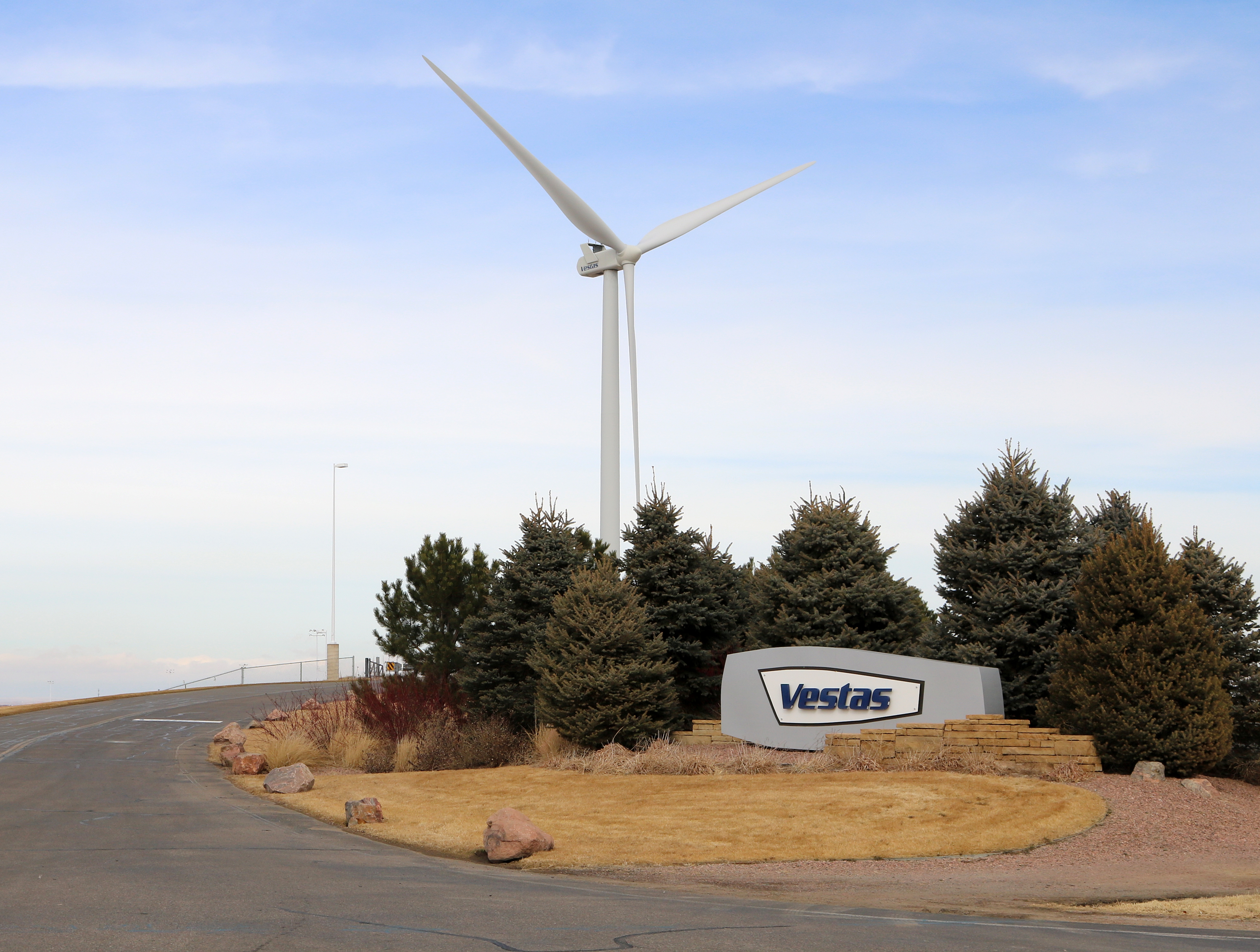
Vestas factory entrance in Pueblo, Colorado

On 13 August 2012, an estimated 90 workers were laid off from the Pueblo facility. In 2013, the tower factory in Pueblo began ramping up to full utilization as orders rebounded from the 2012 slump. Other facilities in Colorado include a further 750 persons employed at a blade manufacturing facility in Windsor, Colorado. Vestas has a nacelle manufacturing facility in Brighton, Colorado. Vestas sold its tower manufacturing facility in Pueblo, Colorado to CS Wind in 2021. Vestas said it decided to build its North American production facilities in Colorado because of the state’s central location, extensive transportation infrastructure and rail system, existing manufacturing base, and skilled workforce. In May 2013, Marika Fredriksson became the company's new Executive Vice President and Chief Financial Officer after her predecessor Dag Andresen resigned for personal reasons. Her strategy is to lead Vestas back to higher earnings after the important losses faced by the company: from €166 million losses in 2011 and increasing to €963 million in 2012.

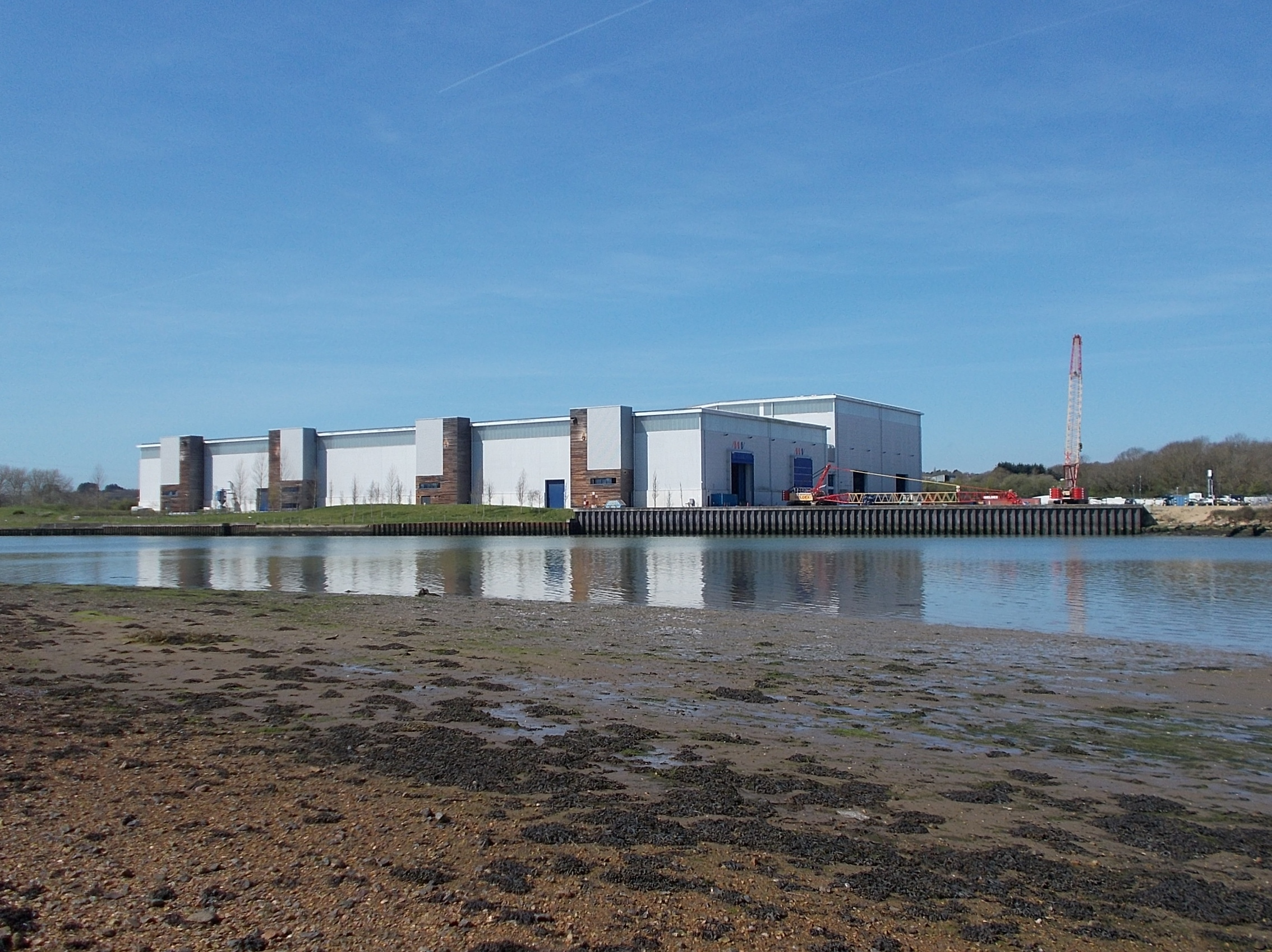
MHI Vestas factory beside the River Medina, Isle of Wight, UK

In September 2013, Vestas made a joint venture for offshore wind turbines with Mitsubishi Heavy Industries creating MHI-Vestas, including the 7-9 MW Vestas V164, the most powerful turbine on Earth at that time.

In October 2013 Vestas sold its four casting and two machining factories to VTC Partners GmbH.

In May 2014, Vestas announced it would be adding hundreds of jobs to its Colorado Windsor and Brighton facilities and following a rough 2012 it called 2013 one of Vestas’s "best years ever". Vestas also added employees in Pueblo and expected the tower facility to eventually top 500. Vestas stated that it expected to have 2800 employees in Colorado by the end of 2014. As of 2016, Vestas has a US nacelle production capacity of 2.6 GW.

In March 2015, Vestas announced it would be upping jobs by 400 at its blade manufacturing facility in Windsor and stated "We had a very successful 2014". In 2015 almost half of all Vestas turbines were going to the American market (nearly 3 GW for US out of 7.5 GW worldwide). Vestas intends to build a blade factory in India in 2016. In 2014 and 2015, 26 dishonest employees were detected with the company's whistleblower program (the first in Denmark), and disciplined.

In February 2016, Vestas got its largest order of 1,000 MW (278 x 3.6 MW) for the Fosen project near Trondheim in Norway. It costs DKK 11 billion, and should deliver 3.4 TWh per year. In 1Q 2016, the average wind turbine price was 0.83 million Euro per MW, compared to 0.91 a year before. In 2016, Vestas was voted number 7 on the Clean200 list. In 2019, MHI-Vestas received a supply and operations vessel for the Deutsche Bucht Offshore Wind Project, with a further two ships scheduled for other projects.

=== Research and development ===
Vestas spent €92 million ($128 million), or 1.4% of revenue, on research and development in 2009. It has filed 787 wind turbine patents (227 in 2010) according to United Kingdom Intellectual Property Office (UK-IPO), while General Electric has 666 and Siemens Wind Power has 242.

In October 2009, Vestas and QinetiQ claimed a successful test of a stealth wind turbine blade mitigating radar reflection problems for aviation.

In December 2010 Vestas were developing the V164 7 MW offshore turbine, with a 164 m rotor diameter. Prototypes of it were manufactured at Lindø (the former Maersk shipyard) due to size, crane and port access requirements. Series production of nacelles for the 32 turbines (256 MW) extension of the 90 MW Burbo Bank Offshore Wind Farm occurs at Lindø, while blades are made at Vestas' Isle of Wight facilities in England. DONG Energy tested a prototype in the sea off Frederikshavn in 2013, at a cost of DKK 240 million. A V164 was installed for testing in Østerild Wind Turbine Test Field in 2014, later uprated to more power.

In June 2011, the Vestas supercomputer Firestorm was number 53 on the TOP500-list of the world's most powerful computers calculating worldwide weather in a 3x3 km grid, and it delivers daily weather reports to the newspaper Ekstra Bladet and similar purposes. In 2012, Vestas donated the older 1344-core supercomputer from 2008 to Aalborg University.

In October 2011, Vestas participated in the deployment of a floating wind turbine offshore of Portugal. Vestas supplied a v80 2.0 MW offshore turbine to Windplus, S.A. (a joint-venture company including Energias de Portugal, Repsol, Principle Power, A. Silva Matos, Inovcapital and Portugal Ventures). The system, known as the WindFloat, consists of a semi-submersible type floating foundation, a conventional catenary mooring, and the wind turbine. The successful deployment represents the first offshore multi-megawatt wind turbine to be installed without the use of any heavy-lift or specialized offshore construction equipment.

In 2012, Vestas scaled back and closed some of its R&D offices in Houston, Marlborough, Louisville, China, Singapore and Denmark.

In August 2013, Vestas started operating its 20 MW test bench for nacelles in Aarhus.

On 5 September 2013, Chris Spruce, Vestas Senior Product Engineer, served as member of the Scientific Advisory Board (SAB) for the kite-energy-systems project ERC HIGHWIND, a project at KU Leuven dedicated to the research and development of tethered airfoils dedicated to generating energy by airborne wind energy (AWE).

In April 2016, Vestas installed a 900 kW quadrotor test wind turbine at Risø, made from 4 recycled 225 kW V29 turbines. The first three months of testing confirmed theoretical models. Vestas has no immediate plans of commercializing the prototype. Test results were published in 2019, indicating lower costs.

As of 2022, Vestas produces the second highest offshore wind turbine in the world, with a blade of 115 meters and an energy power of 15 MW.

In September 2022, Vestas unveiled the tallest onshore tower for a wind farm. The 199-meter structure will allow turbines to reach the zone of stronger and more stable winds. It is supposed to install a Vestas V172 generator with a rotor diameter of 172 meters and a power of 7.2 MW. It is planned to place the towers in Germany and Austria.

In 2023, the company announced that the V236-15.0MW prototype had reached its rated output of 15 megawatts. The wind turbine is located onshore at the Østerild wind turbine test field on the north coast of Jutland. However, it is intended for offshore wind farms. Vestas claims that it has a capacity factor of over 60%.

Vestas operates a blade recycling facility in the US.

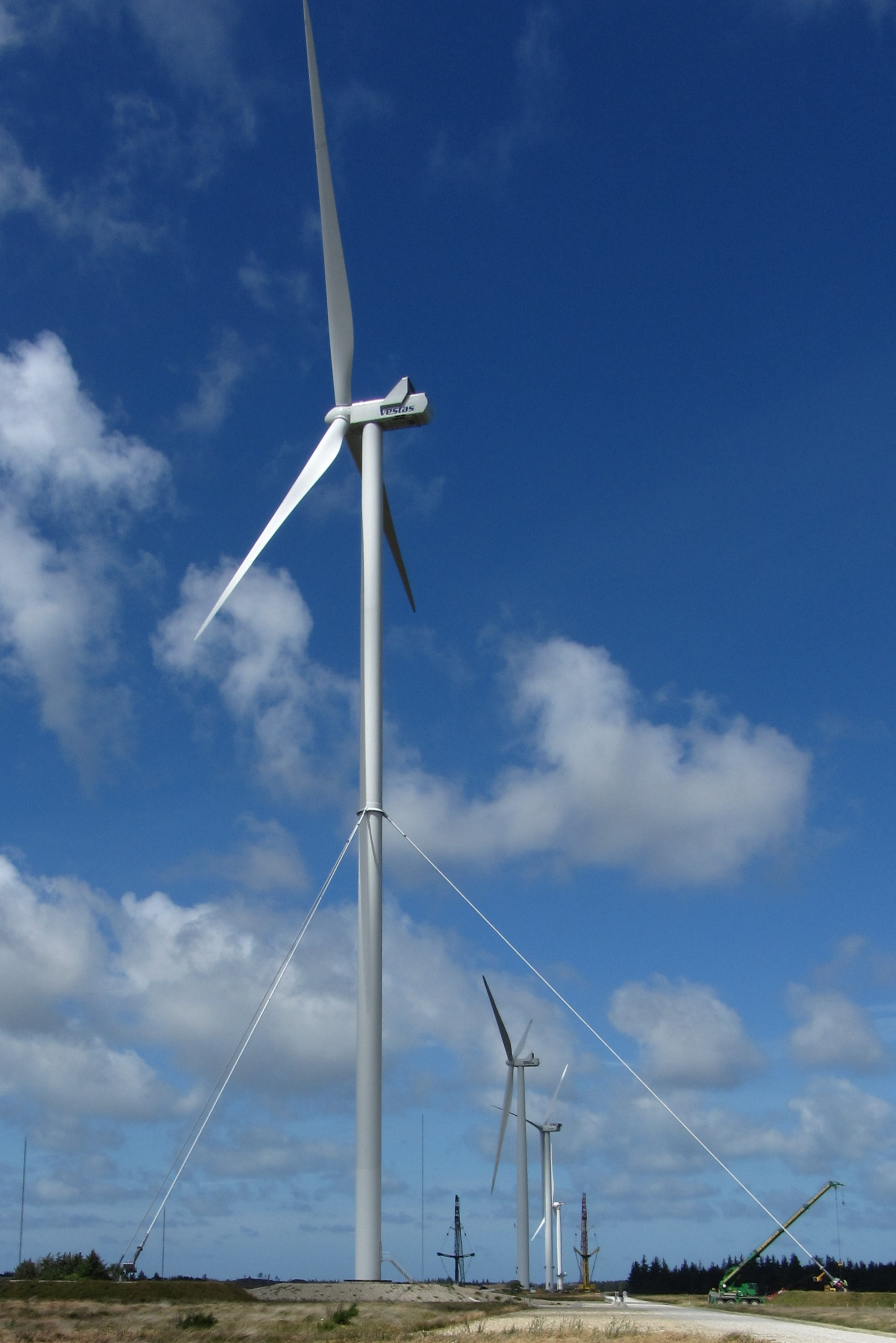
Vestas V126-3.45 MW guyed tower at Østerild

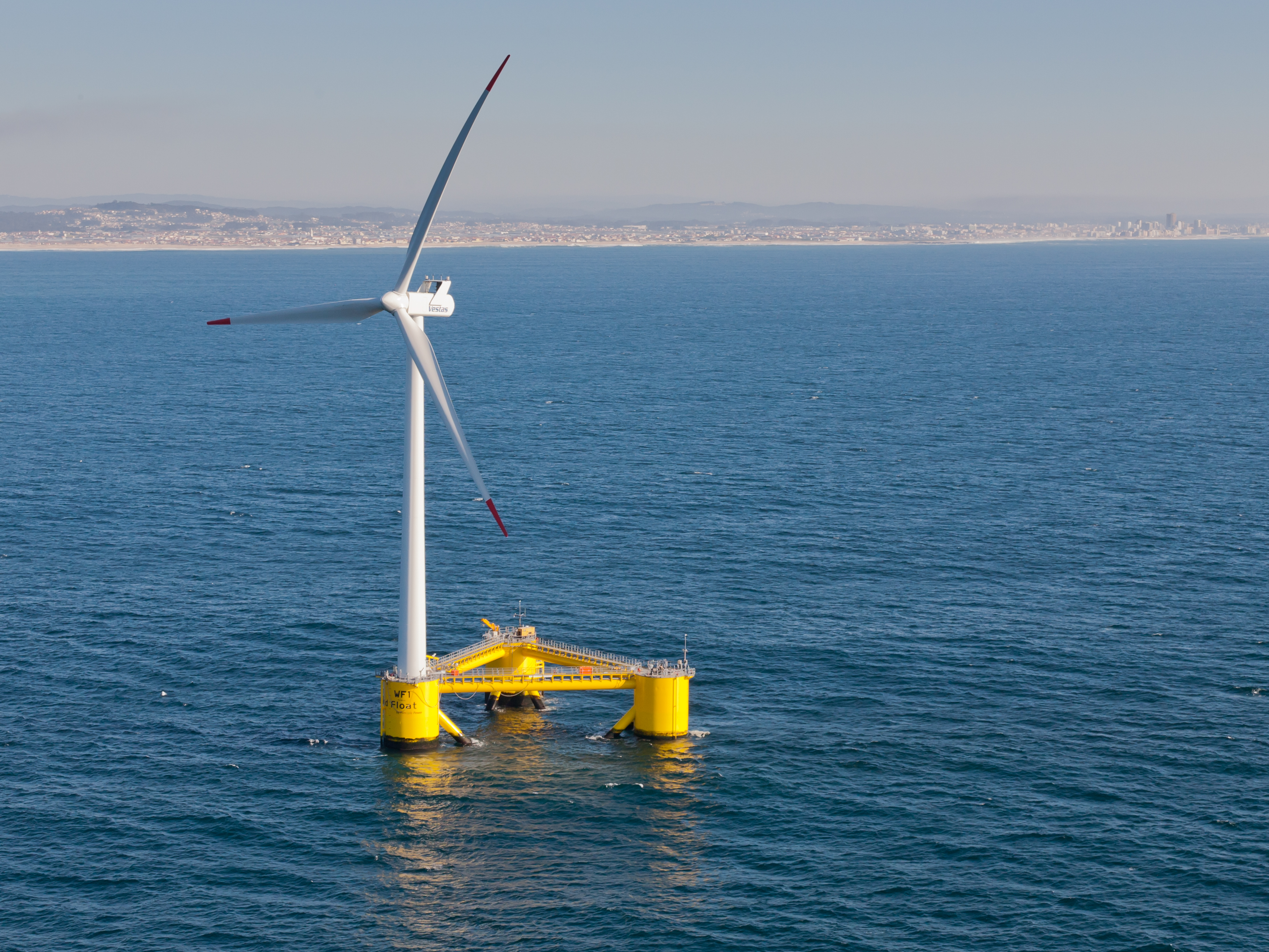
WindFloat, operating at rated capacity (2 MW), approximately 5 km (3 mi) offshore of Agucadoura, Portugal

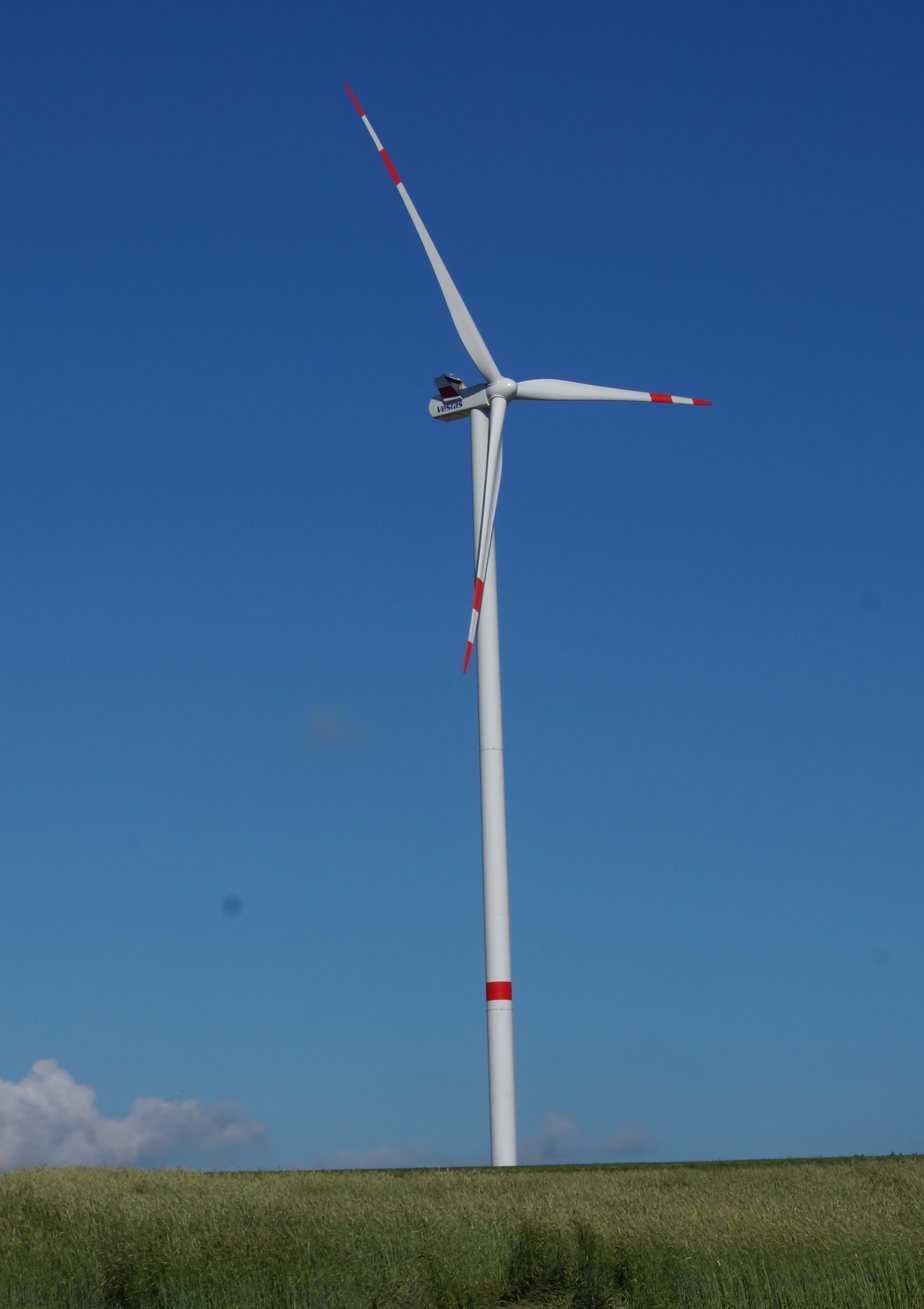
Vestas V112-3.0 MW in Bavaria, Germany

== See also ==
- List of renewable energy companies by country
- List of wind turbine manufacturers
- Renewable energy industry
- Wind power
- Wind power in Denmark
