= Wind turbines on public display =

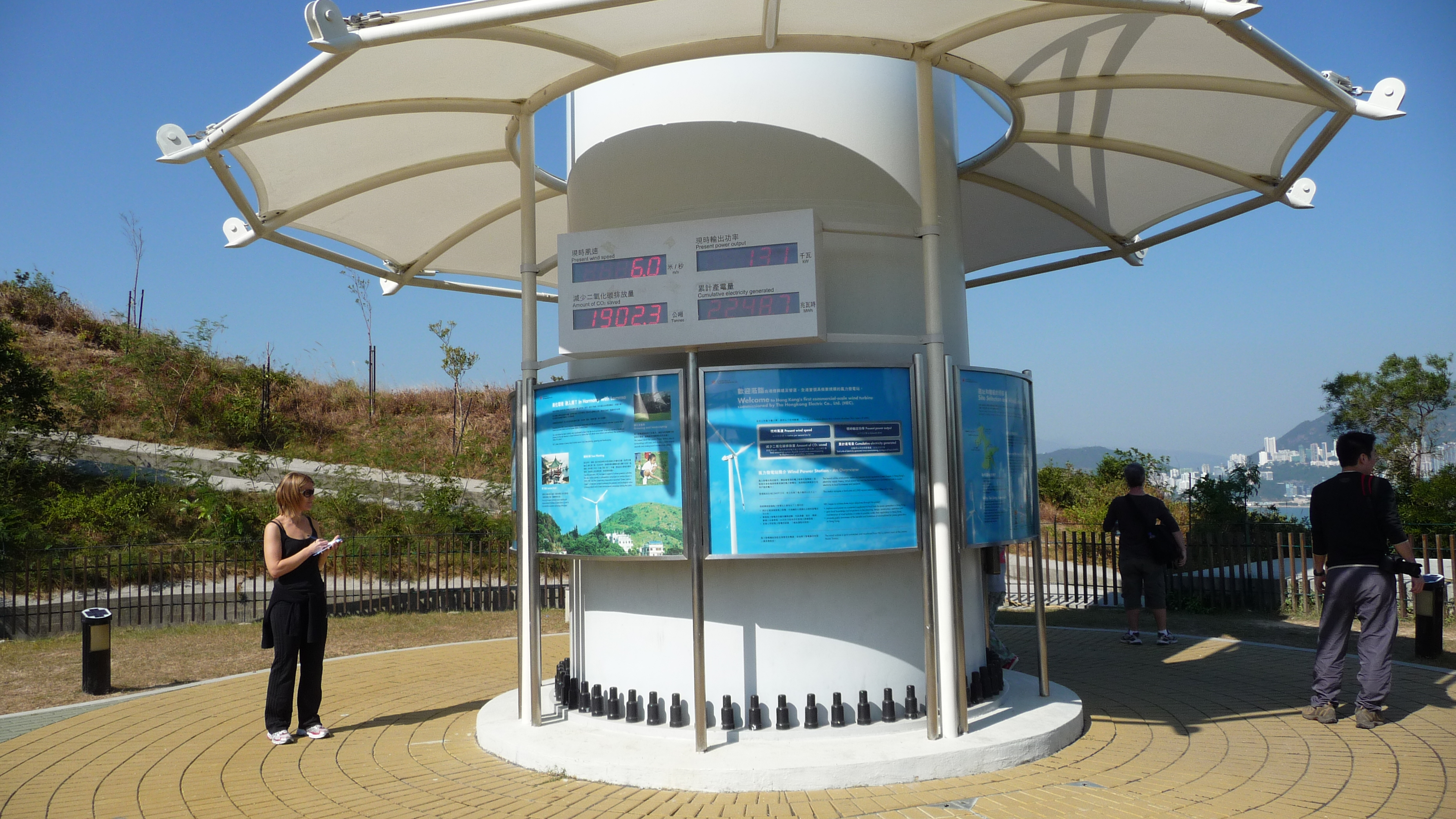
Kiosk at the base of the Lamma Winds Nordex N50/800kW wind turbine on Lamma Island, Hong Kong, with displays showing current power output and cumulative energy produced

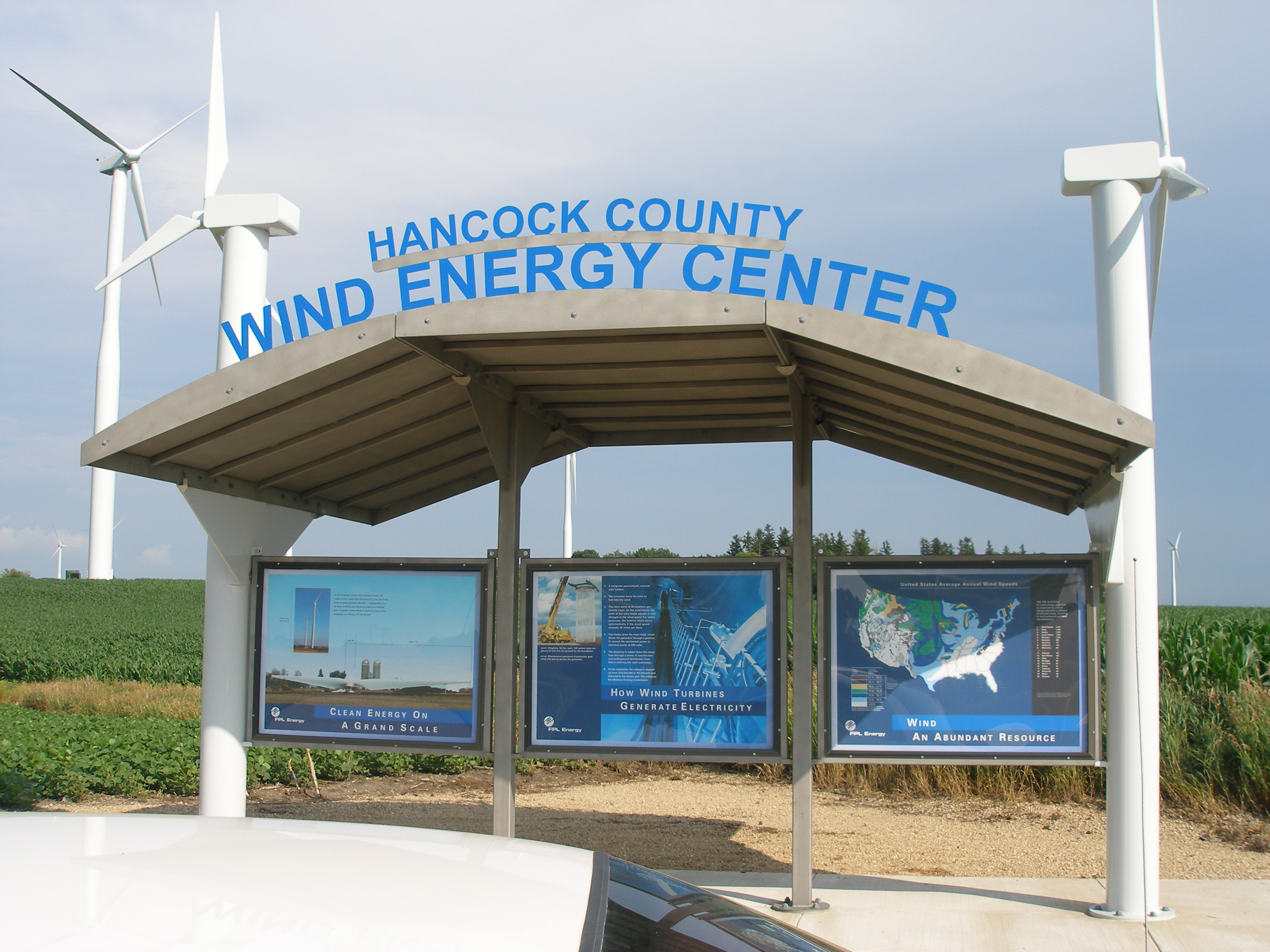
The Hancock County wind energy center in Iowa

The great majority of wind turbines around the world belong to individuals or corporations who use them to generate electric power or to perform mechanical work. As such, wind turbines are primarily designed to be working devices. However, the large size and height above surroundings of modern industrial wind turbines, combined with their moving rotors, often make them among the most conspicuous objects in their areas. A few localities have exploited the attention-getting nature of wind turbines by placing them on public display, either with visitor centers on their bases, or with viewing areas farther away. The wind turbines themselves are generally of conventional horizontal-axis, three-bladed design, and generate power to feed electrical grids, but they also serve the unconventional roles of technology demonstration, public relations, and education.

== Notable wind turbines on public display ==
Australia

- Blayney Wind Farm, New South Wales, has a viewing area and interpretive centre
- Wattle Point Wind Farm, South Australia, has an information centre
- Albany Wind Farm has board walks, viewing towers, interpretive displays and picnic areas on and around the site. It is also traversed by the Bibbulmun Track.

Canada

- The OPG 7 commemorative turbine is a Vestas V80-1.8MW wind turbine on the site of the Pickering Nuclear Generating Station
- The ExPlace Wind Turbine is a Lagerwey Wind model LW 52 wind turbine at Exhibition Place in Toronto

China

- Inner Mongolia's Huitengxile Wind Farm has 14 visitor centers to accommodate wind power tourists to the remote region

Hong Kong

- Lamma Winds in Hong Kong has a single Nordex N50/800 kW model with a rotor diameter of 50m and a nameplate capacity of 800 kW

Ireland

- Dundalk Institute of Technology has a single Vestas V52/850 kW model with a height of 60m and a rotor diameter of 52m.

New Zealand

- Brooklyn, Wellington, New Zealand, has a 230 kW wind turbine

United Kingdom

- Green Britain Centre, Swaffham, Norfolk - the only wind turbine in the UK that is open for the public to climb. Also doubles as a visitor's centre, cafe and education provider. "Permanently closed" for the third time.
- Green Park Business Park has an Enercon E-70 2 MW wind turbine adjacent to the M4 motorway, billed as the UK's most visible turbine
- Renewable Energy Systems has a Vestas V29 225 kW wind turbine visible from the M25 motorway at its headquarters at Beaufort Court, Kings Langley, Hertfordshire
- Scroby Sands wind farm has a visitor center at Great Yarmouth open during the tourist season (May–October)
- Scout Moor Wind Farm "has become a real tourist attraction" since its 2008 opening
- Whitelee Wind Farm near Glasgow has become the first wind energy project in Scotland to join the Association of Scottish Visitor Attractions (ASVA).

United States

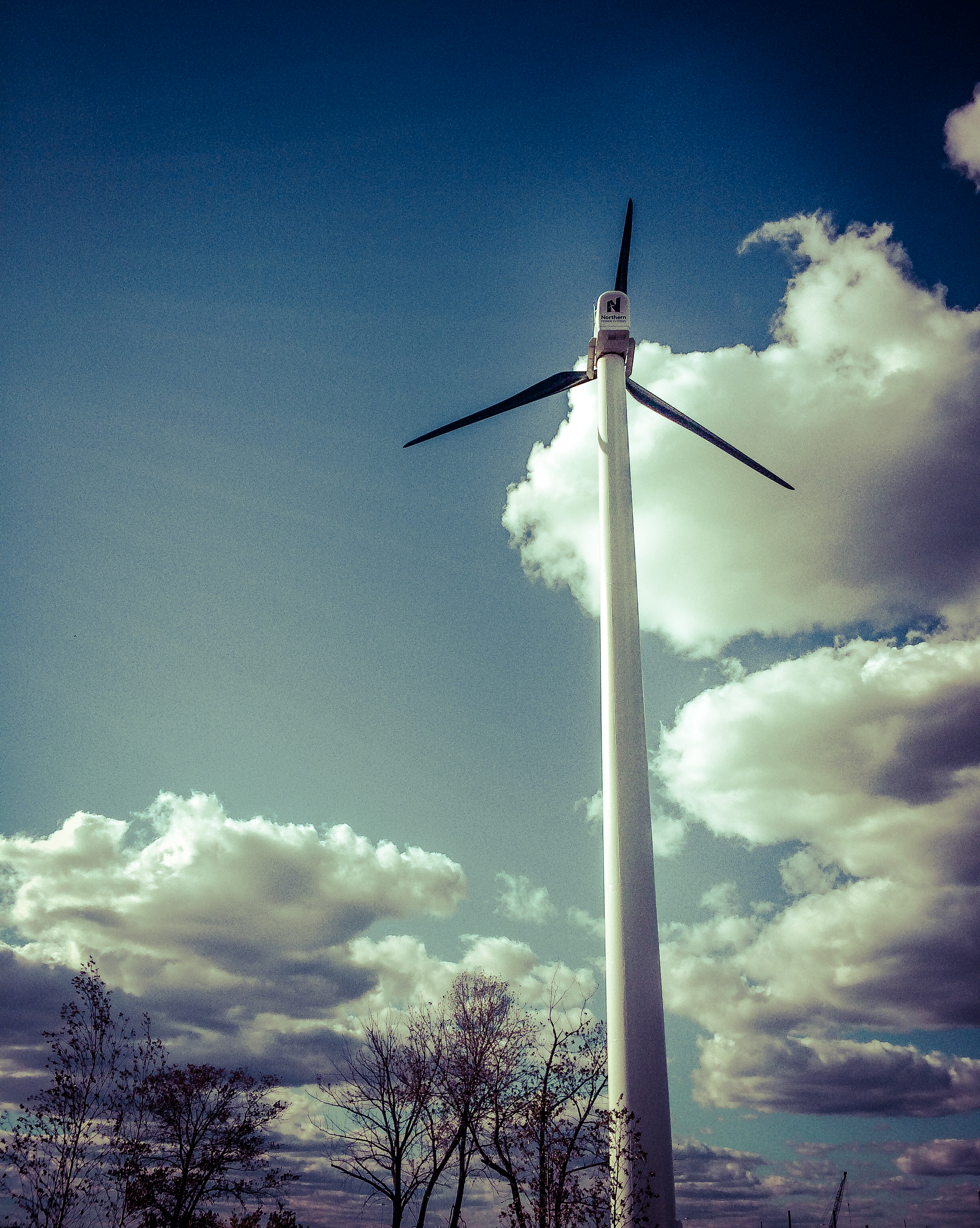
South Brooklyn Marine Terminal Wind Turbine

- Brooklyn, New York Sims Metal Management, a large recycling company which holds a 40-year contract with the City of New York has a 160-foot 100 kW small wind turbine which sits on the north corner of the property. When it was activated in January 2015, it was the city's tallest. It produces about 4% of the facility's power. The Sunset Park Material Recovery Facility administrative building includes an education center which includes exhibits explaining how the plant operates for student and tour groups and connects to the main processing building for public viewing via elevated pedestrian walkway.
- Dorchester, Massachusetts – Local 103 of the International Brotherhood of Electrical Workers installed the first commercial-scale wind turbine within the City of Boston, a 100 kW unit from Fuhrlaender on a 35-meter tower with rotor diameter of 21 meters, visible from the John F. Kennedy Library
- Ellensburg, Washington – Puget Sound Energy's Renewable Energy Center at the Wild Horse Wind and Solar Facility has a 5,000 sq. ft. visitor center, which features numerous exhibits, a conference room, and guided tours to the base of a wind turbine. The center sits on a ridge at 3,500 ft. in the middle of the 149 turbine facility (Vestas V80 turbines). The Wild Horse Wind Farm is open to visitors from 9:00-5:30 daily, from April through November.
- Dorchester, Massachusetts - Local 103 of the International Brotherhood of Electrical Workers installed the first commercial-scale wind turbine within the City of Boston, a 100 kW unit from Fuhrlaender on a 35-meter tower with rotor diameter of 21 meters, visible from the John F. Kennedy Library
- The Great Lakes Science Center in Cleveland, Ohio has a reconditioned Vestas V27 wind turbine with a nameplate capacity of 225 kW
- Great River Energy's headquarters in Maple Grove, Minnesota has a NEG Micon M700 wind turbine, visible from Interstate 94
- Laurel, New York has a Northern Power Systems 100 kW turbine at the Half Hollow Nursery and private tours of the operating turbine are provided by Eastern Energy Systems Inc. of Mattituck, New York.
- Lubbock, Texas has a Vestas V47 at the American Wind Power Center
- McKinney, Texas has a Wal-Mart store with several sustainability features, including two wind turbines manufactured by Bergey Windpower, of 1 kW and 50 kW nameplate capacity respectively
- Sweetwater, Texas has a 2 MW 60 Hz DeWind D8.2 prototype wind turbine for training students in the Texas State Technical College wind energy program
Wind turbines on public display
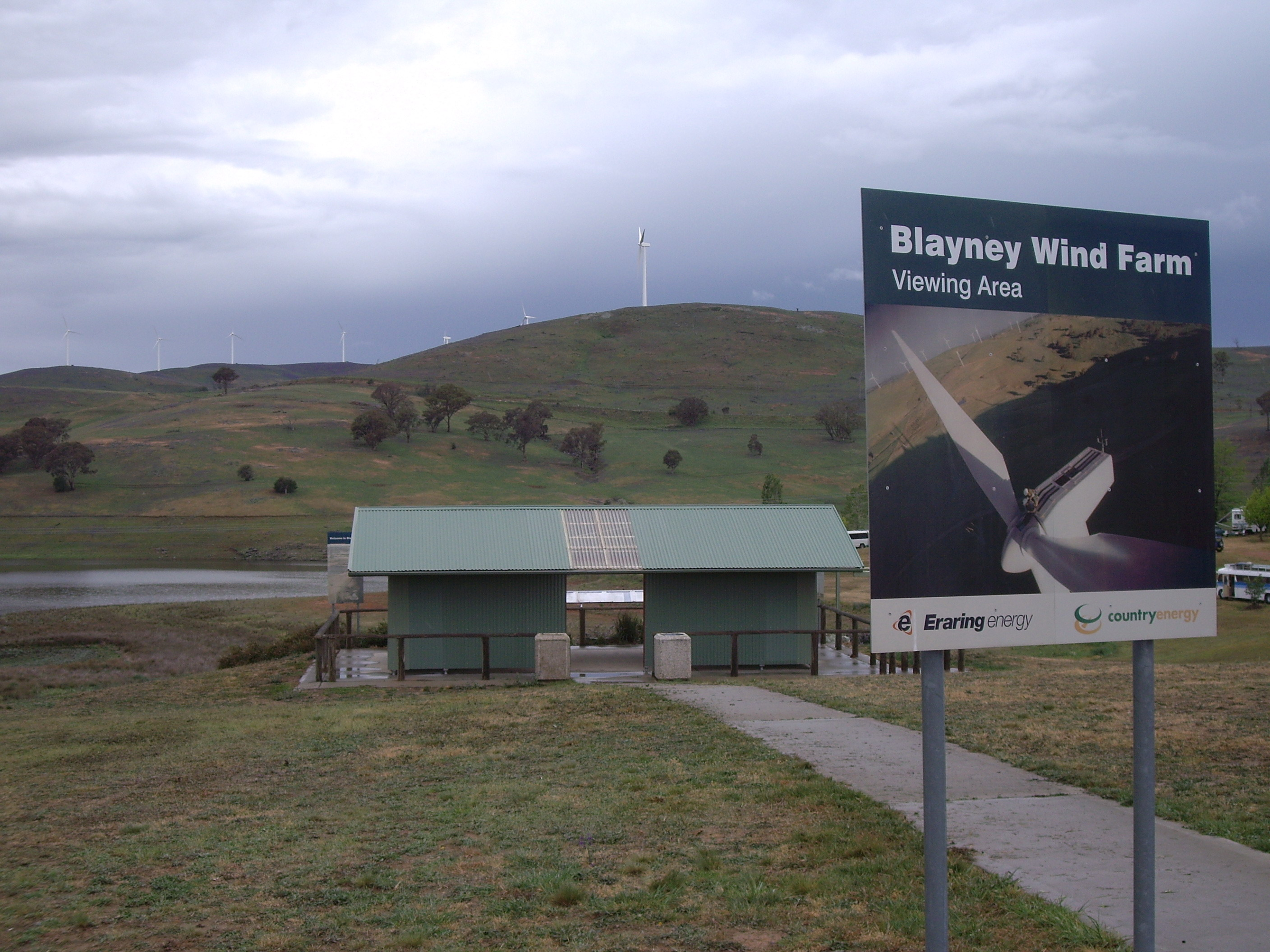
Blayney Wind Farm, New South Wales viewing area

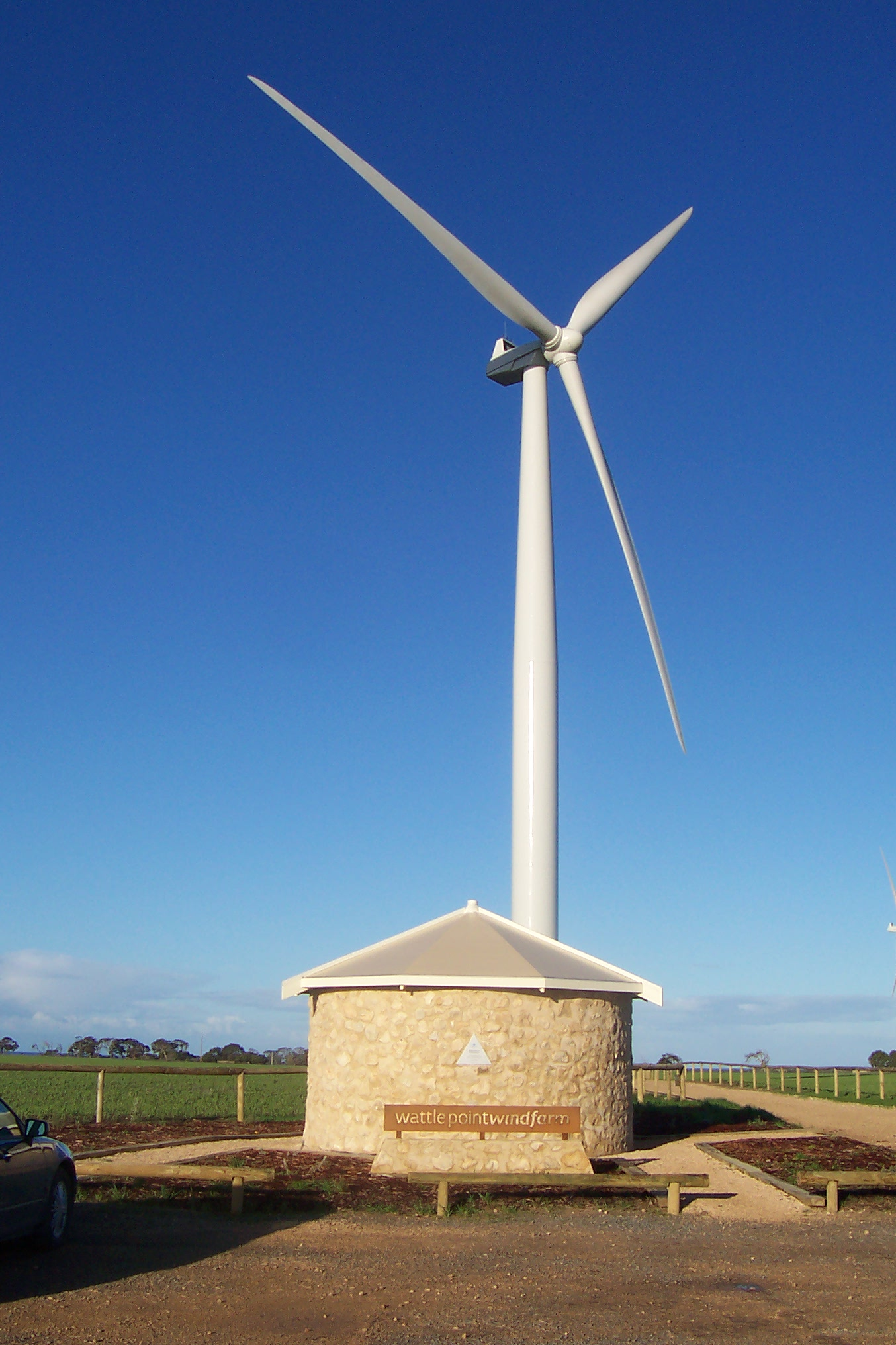
Wattle Point Wind Farm's information centre

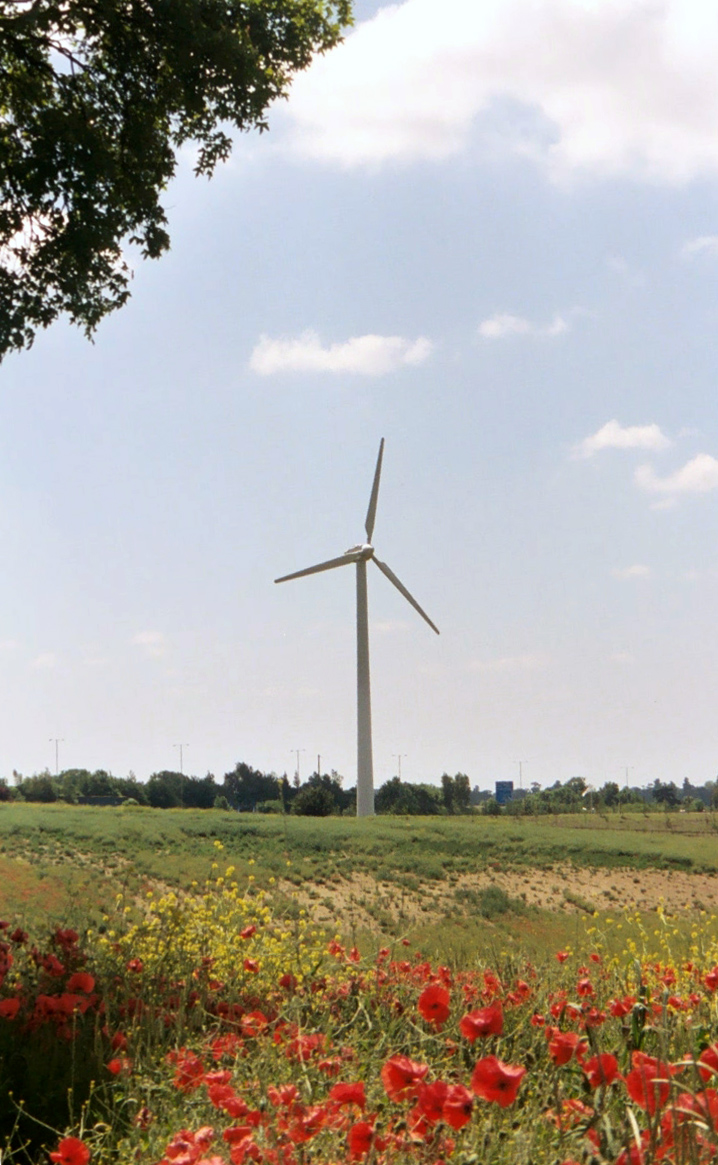
Vestas V29 wind turbine at Beaufort Court, Kings Langley, UK

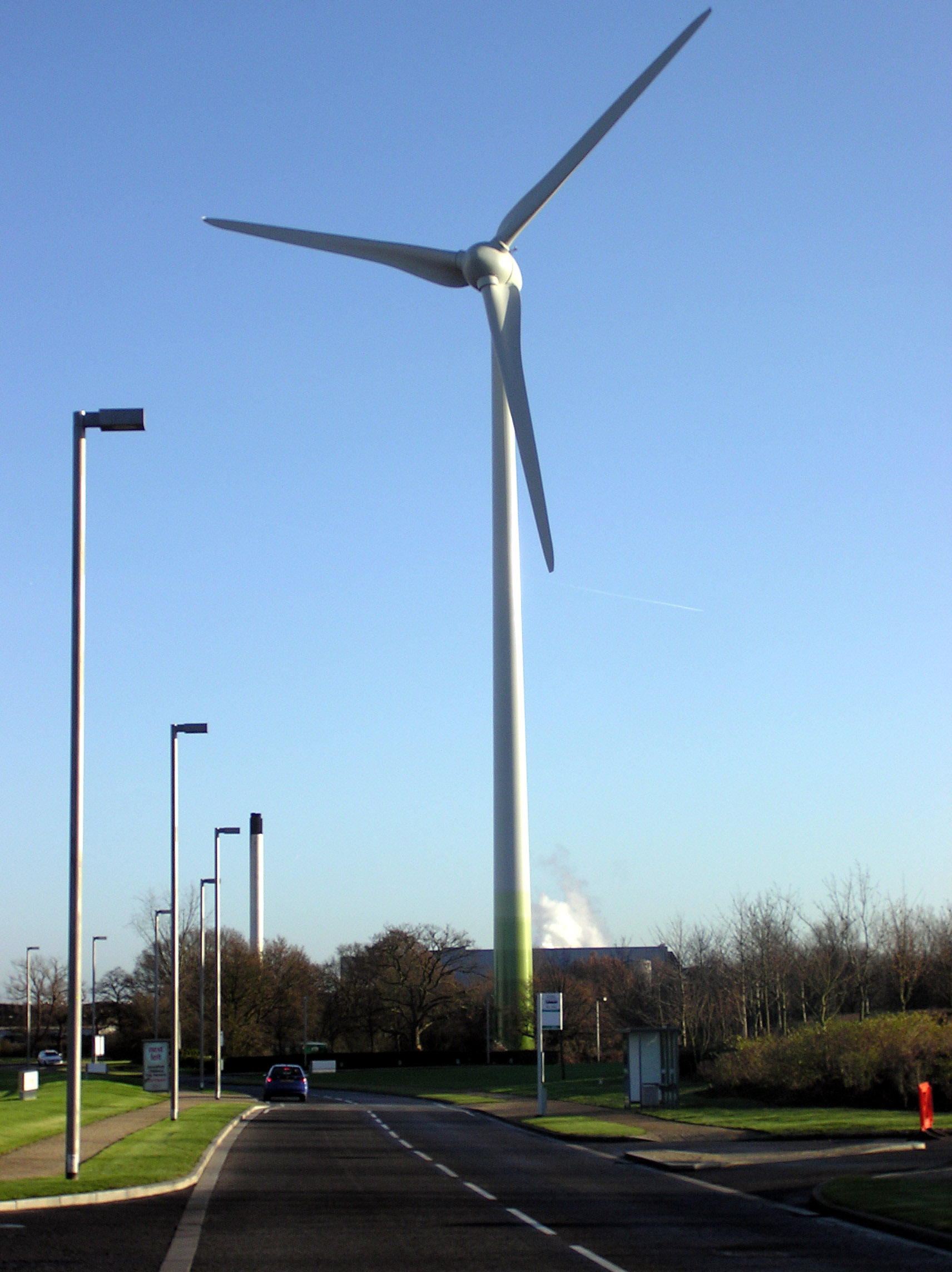
Enercon E-70 at Green Park Business Park, UK

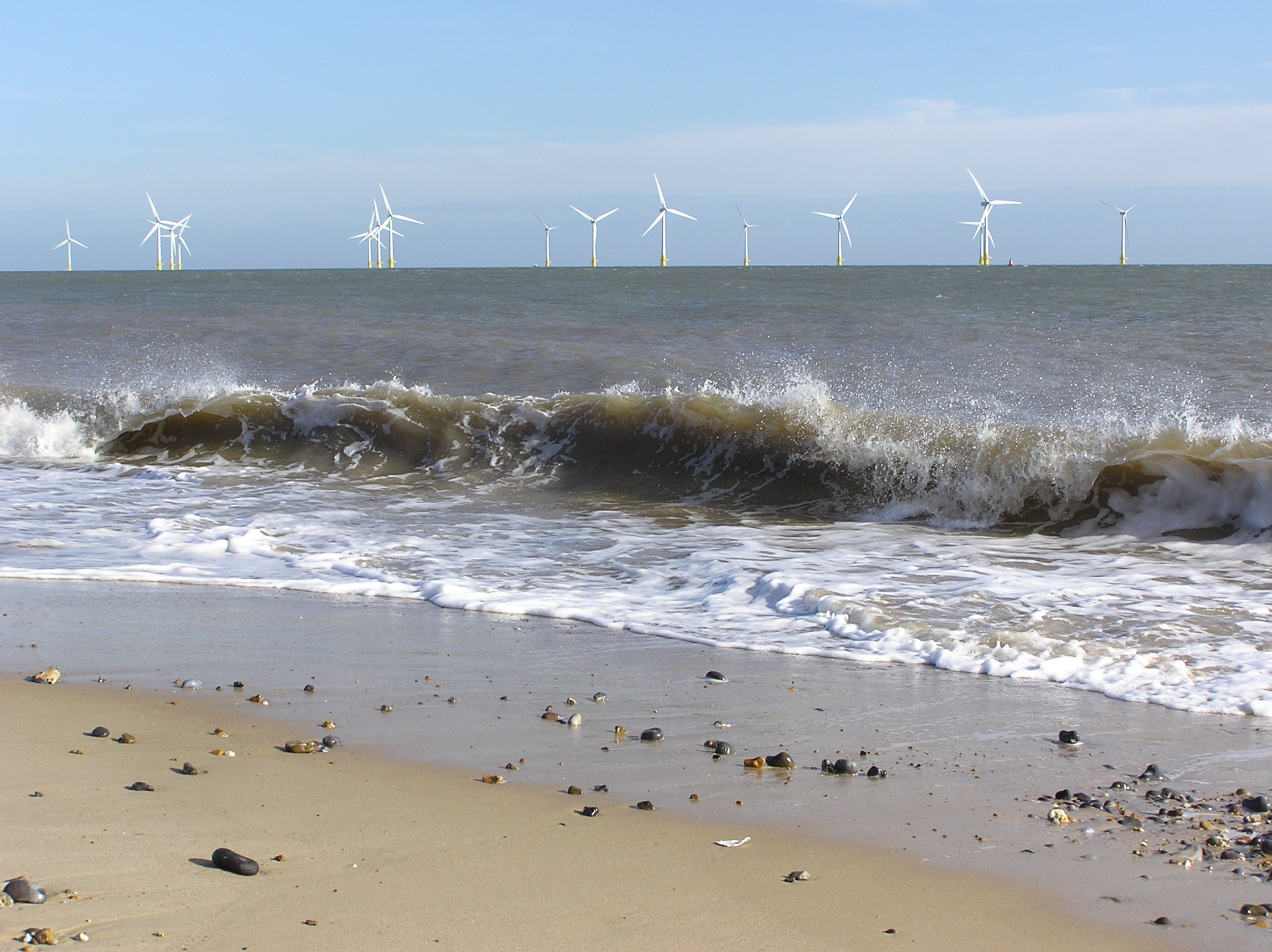
Scroby Sands wind farm off the coast of Great Yarmouth, UK

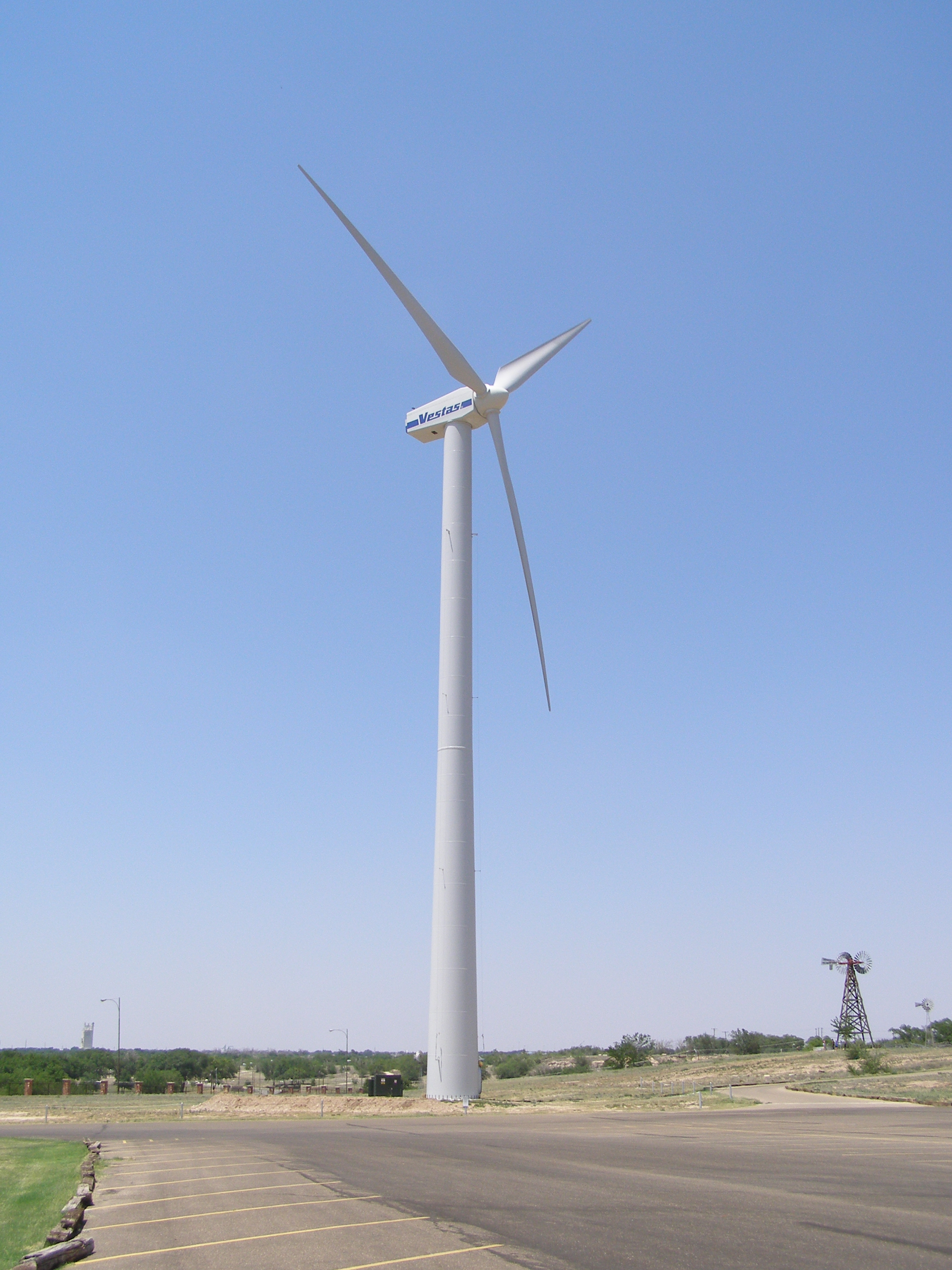
Vestas V47 wind turbine at American Wind Power Center in Lubbock, Texas

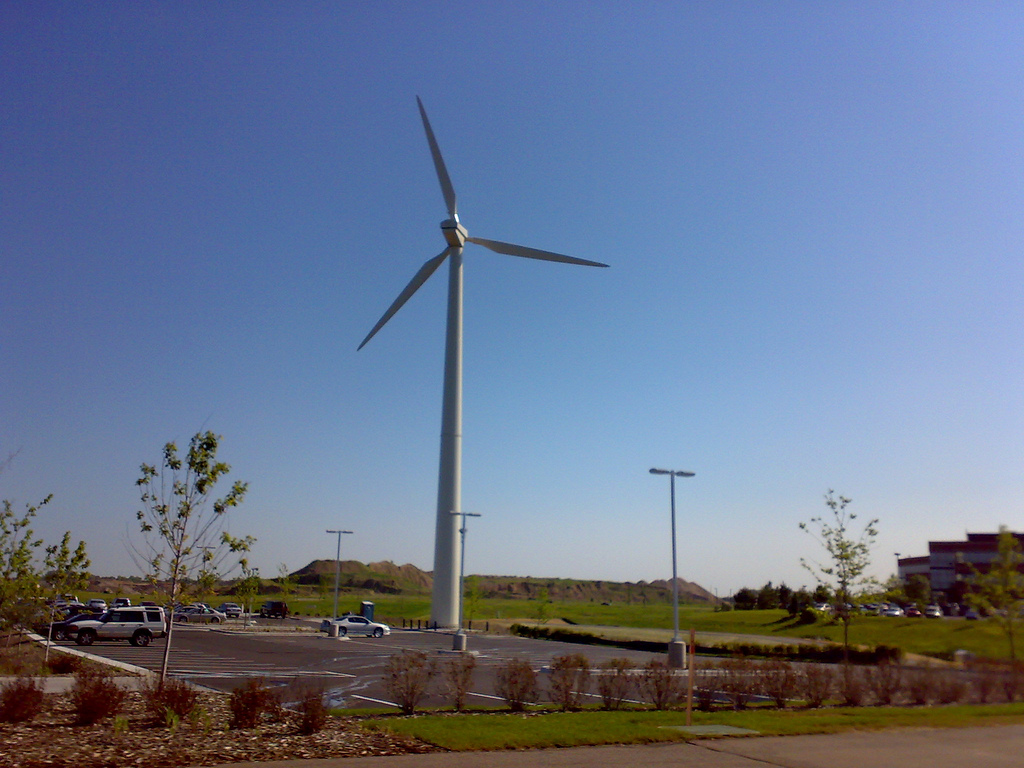
The NEG Micon M700 wind turbine at the Great River Energy headquarters in Maple Grove, Minnesota

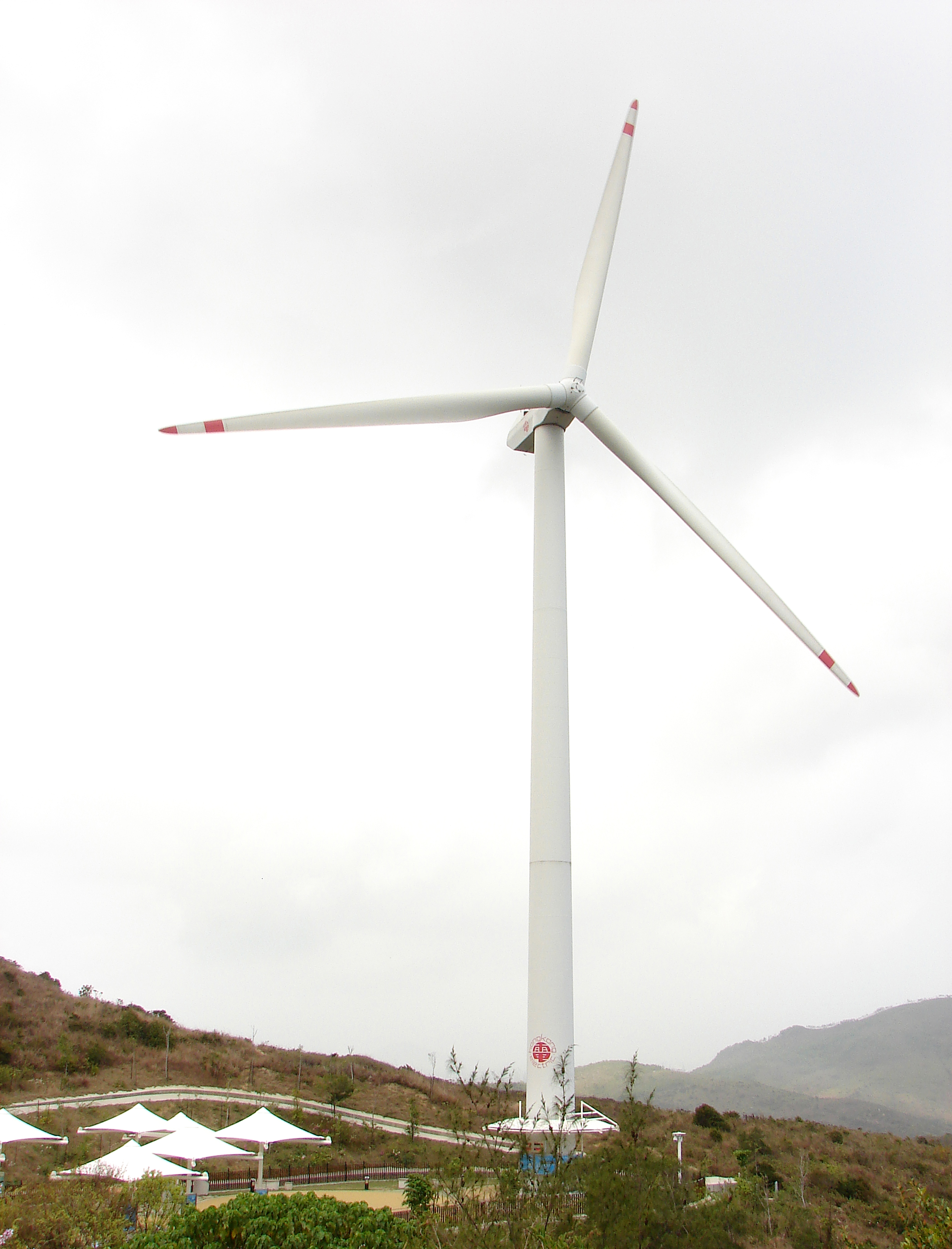
The Nordex N50 wind turbine and visitor centre of Lamma Winds in Hong Kong.

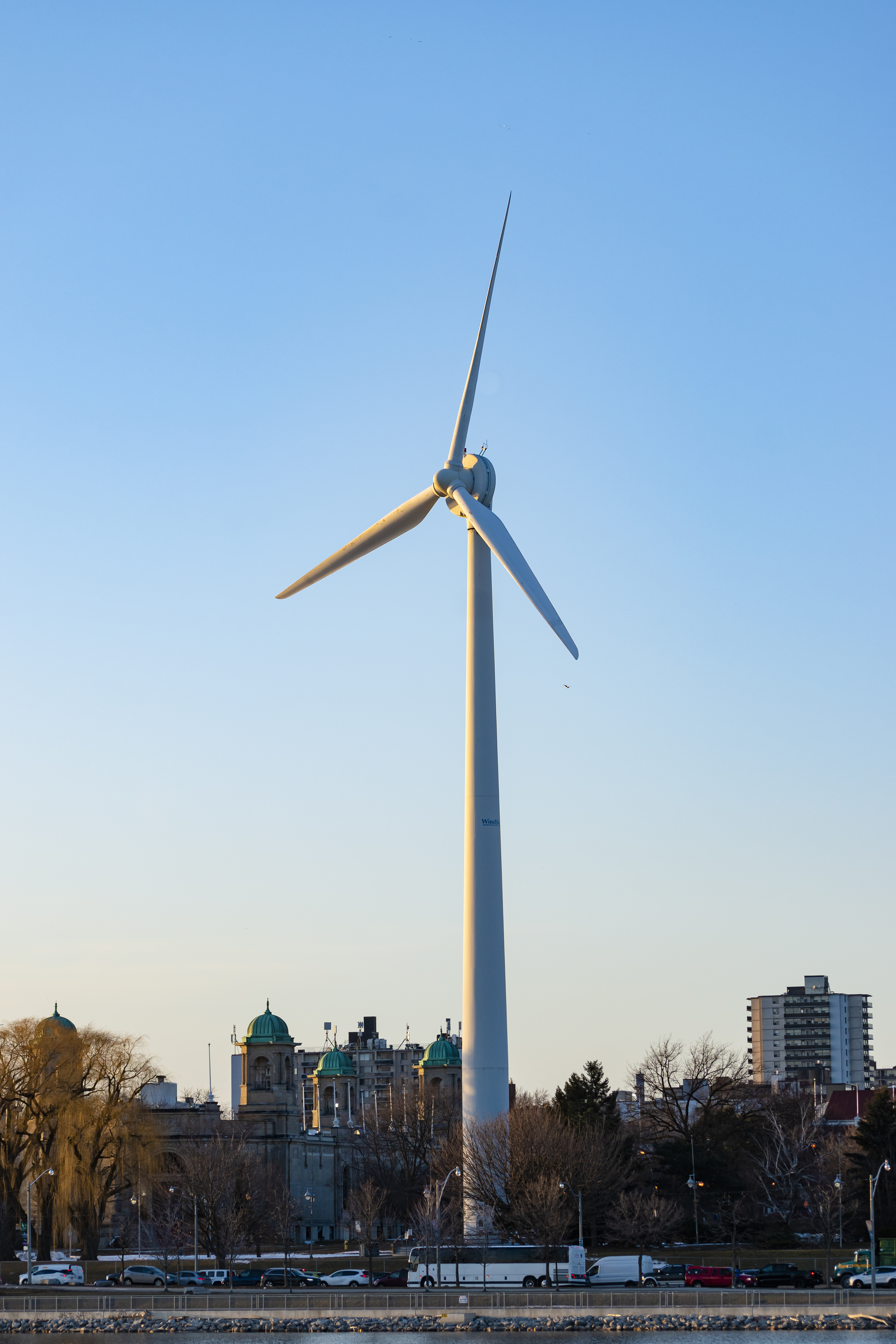
WindShare 750 kW, direct drive, Lagerwey Wind model LW 52 wind turbine in Toronto, Ontario

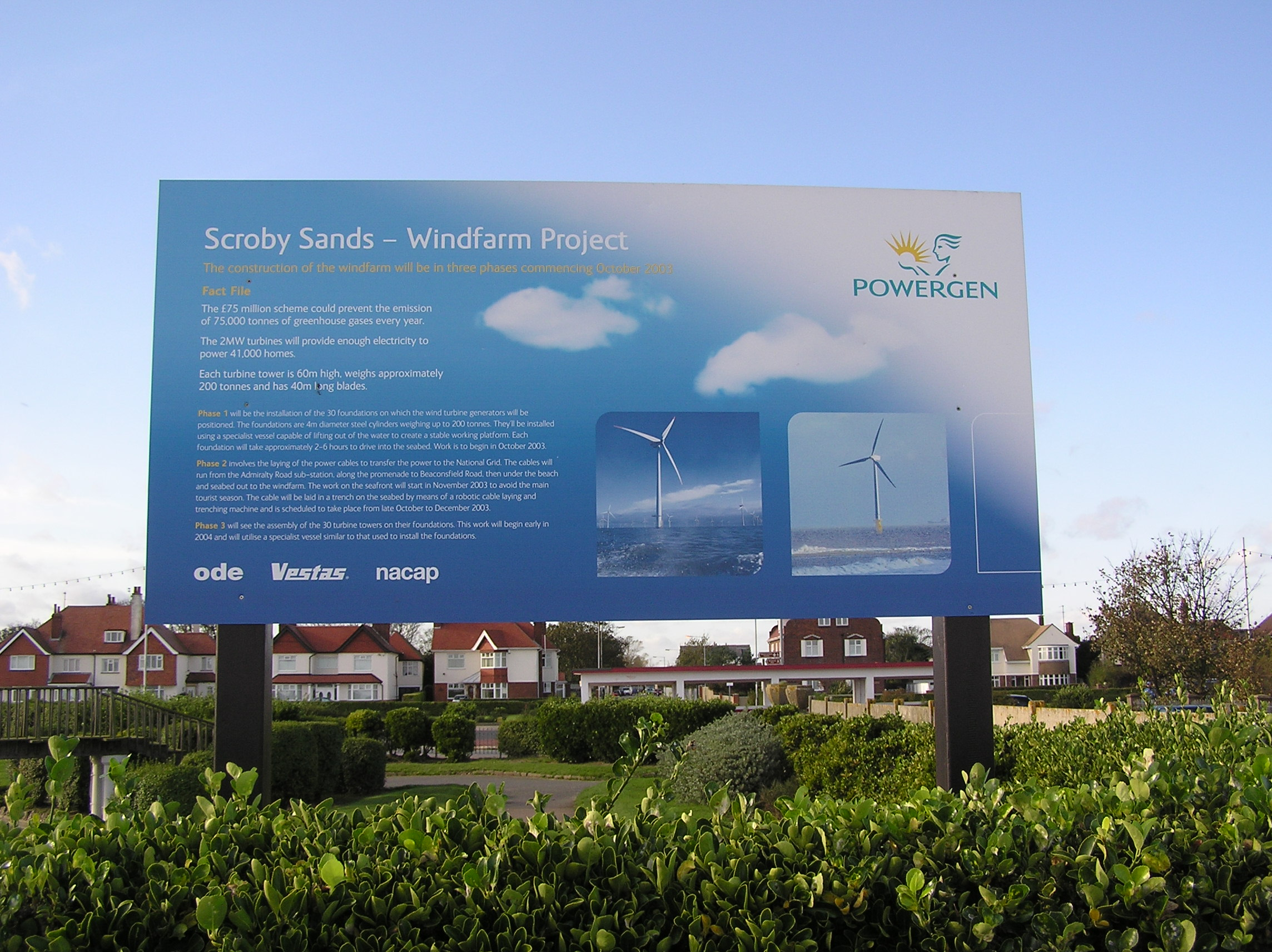
Visitor Centre at Scroby Sands wind farm

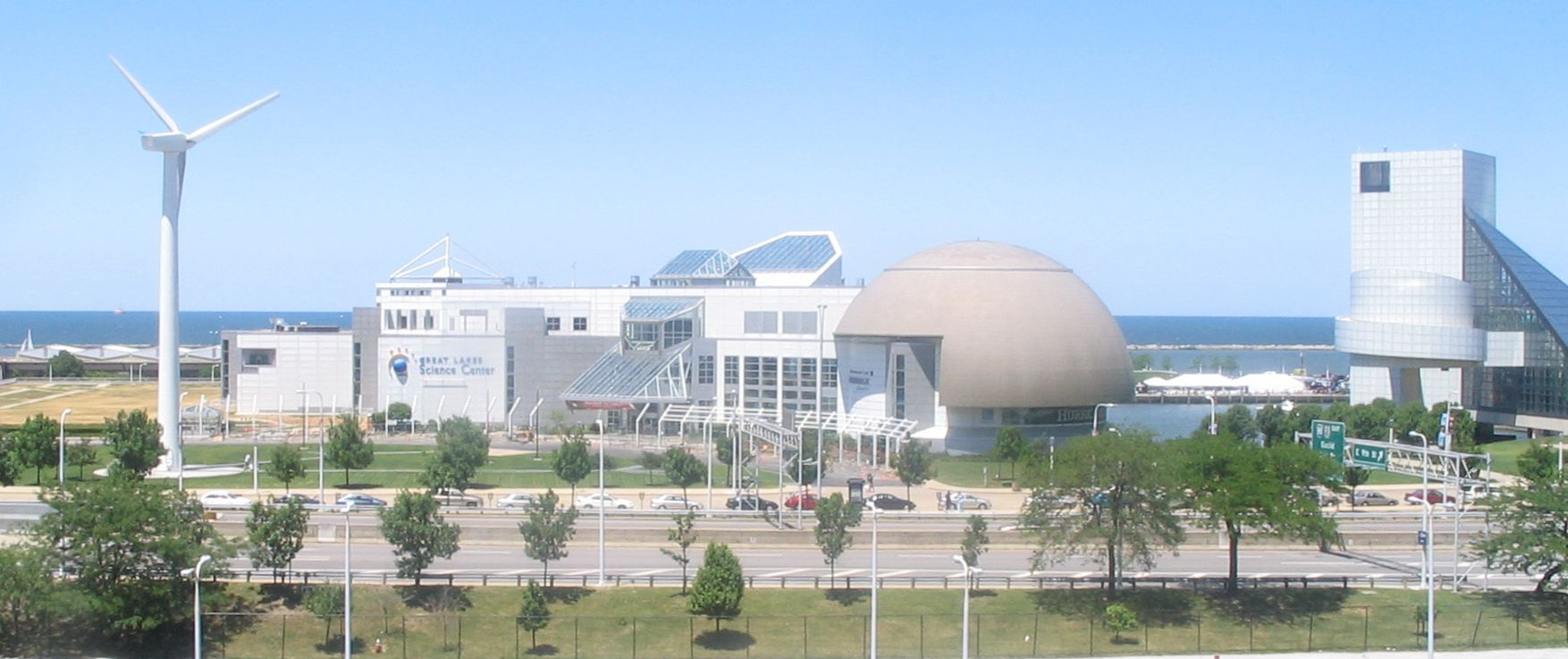
Vestas V27 at the Great Lakes Science Center in Cleveland, Ohio

== Observation deck ==
Some wind turbines on public display go one further, with observation decks beneath their nacelles. The observation decks are accessed with stairs inside the tower.

Austria

- Wind turbine at Pesendorf, Lichtenegg, Lower Austria. Type Enercon E-66
- One turbine at the wind farm Energiepark near Bruck an der Leitha, Type Enercon E-66

Canada

- Grouse Mountain Resorts in North Vancouver, British Columbia installed a Leitwind 1.5MW wind turbine with an observation deck, atop a 65m tower, at an elevation of 1,300m, opening just before the 2010 Winter Olympics.

Germany

- One wind turbine at Windpark Holtriem. Type Enercon E-66
- Visitor wind turbine "Windfang" (German for "Wind Catcher") nearby Aachen. Type Enercon E-66
- Wind turbine Südkronsberg on the Kronsberg hill near Hannover, Type Enercon E-66

Netherlands

- The Siemens plant in Zoetermeer features a wind turbine with 40m blade length and an observation deck. Type Enron Wind (Tacke) 1.5s

United Kingdom

- Another Enercon E-66 wind turbine with an observation deck belonging to Ecotricity is in the English town of Swaffham.
Wind turbines with observation decks
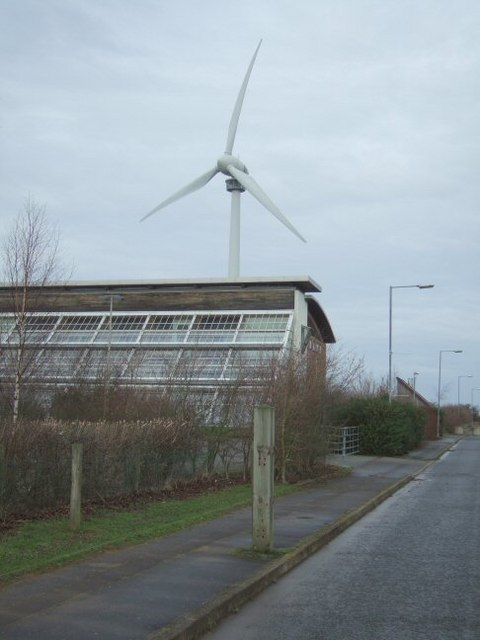
Enercon E-66 at Swaffham's Ecotech centre, showing observation deck below nacelle

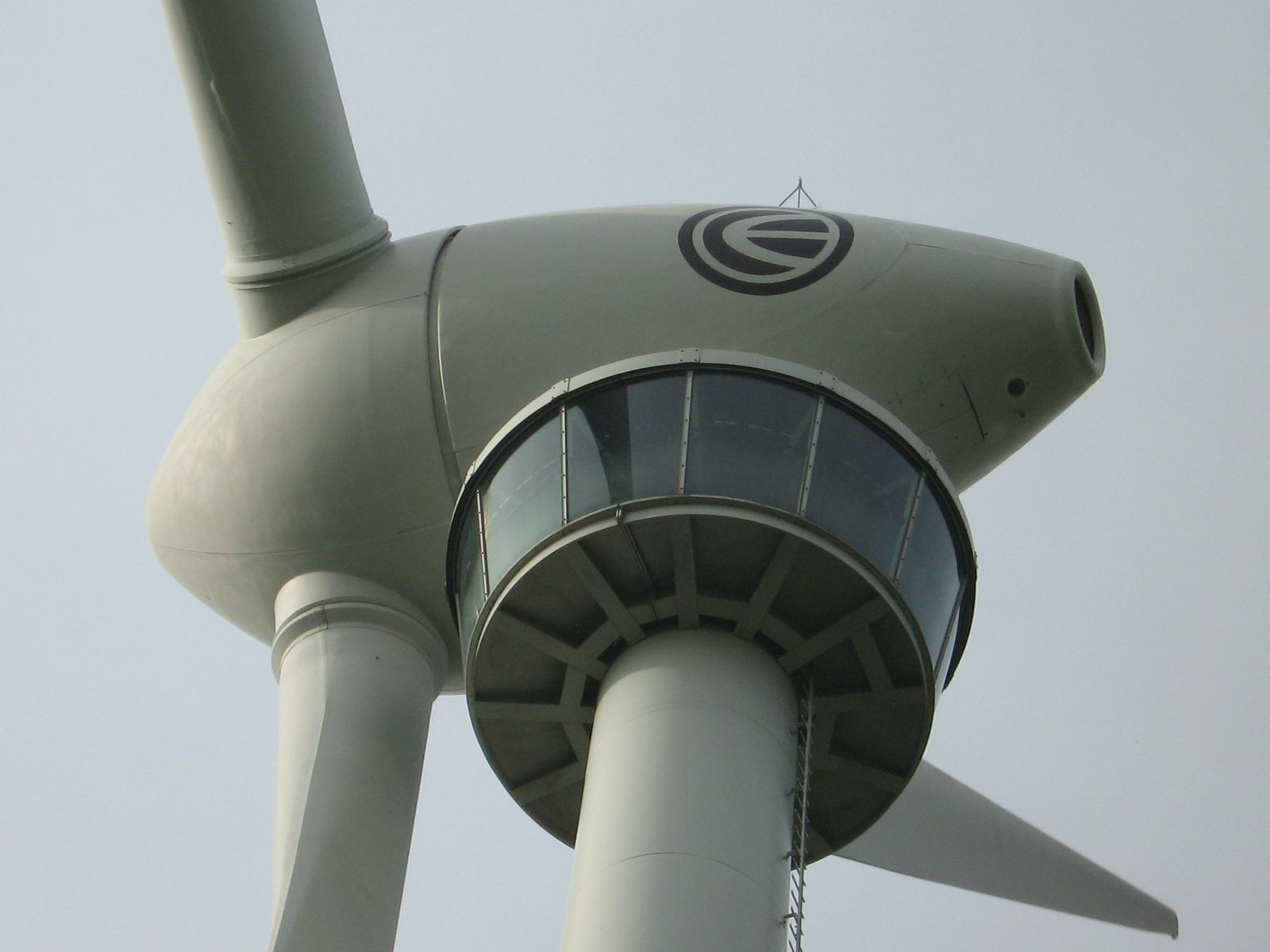
Closeup of the Enercon E-66 at Swaffham

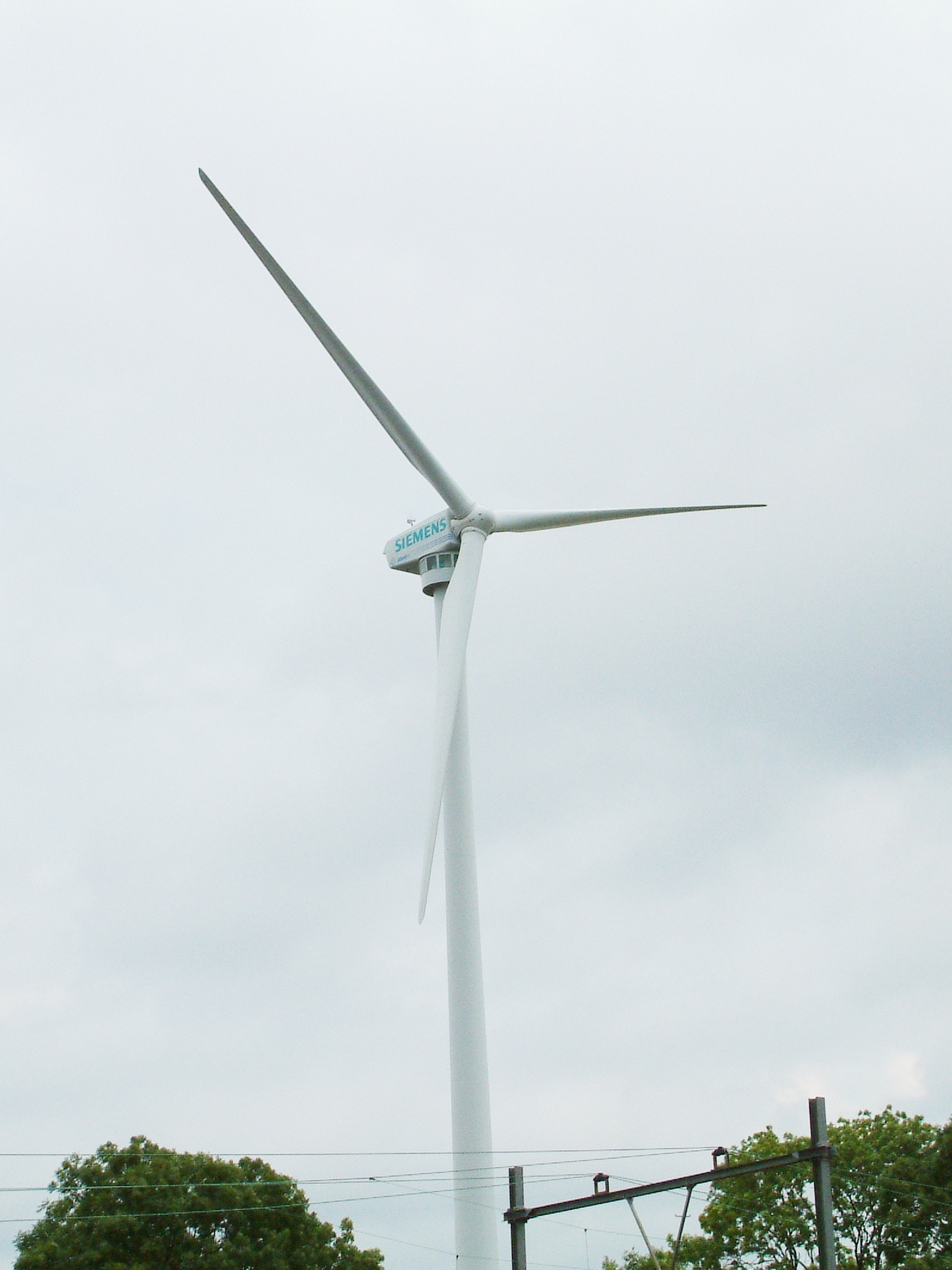
Wind turbine with observation deck at Siemens plant in Zoetermeer

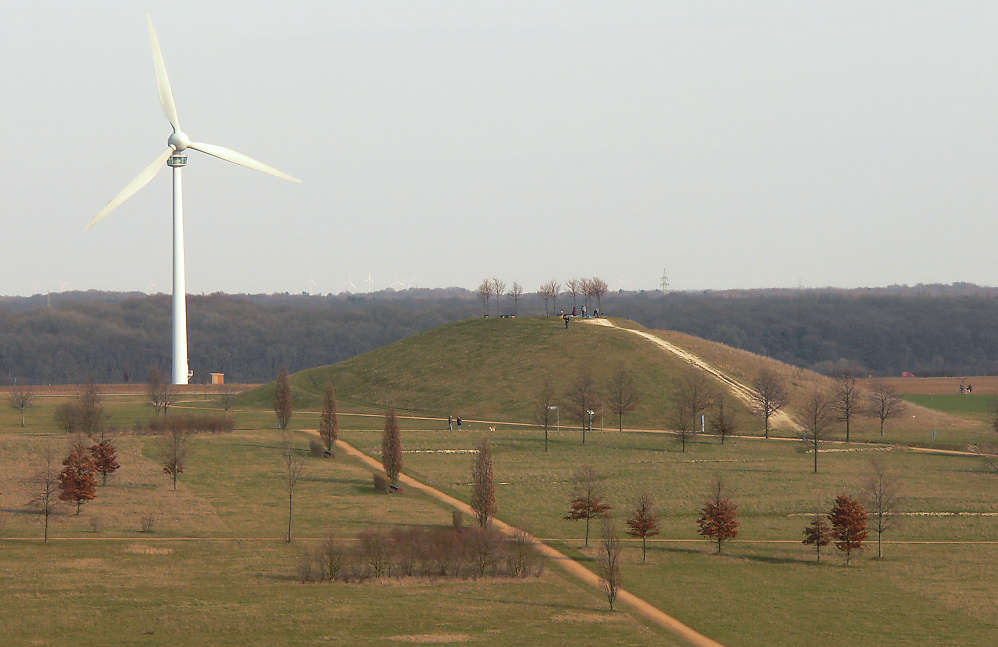
Wind turbine with observation deck on Kronsberg hill near Hannover, Germany

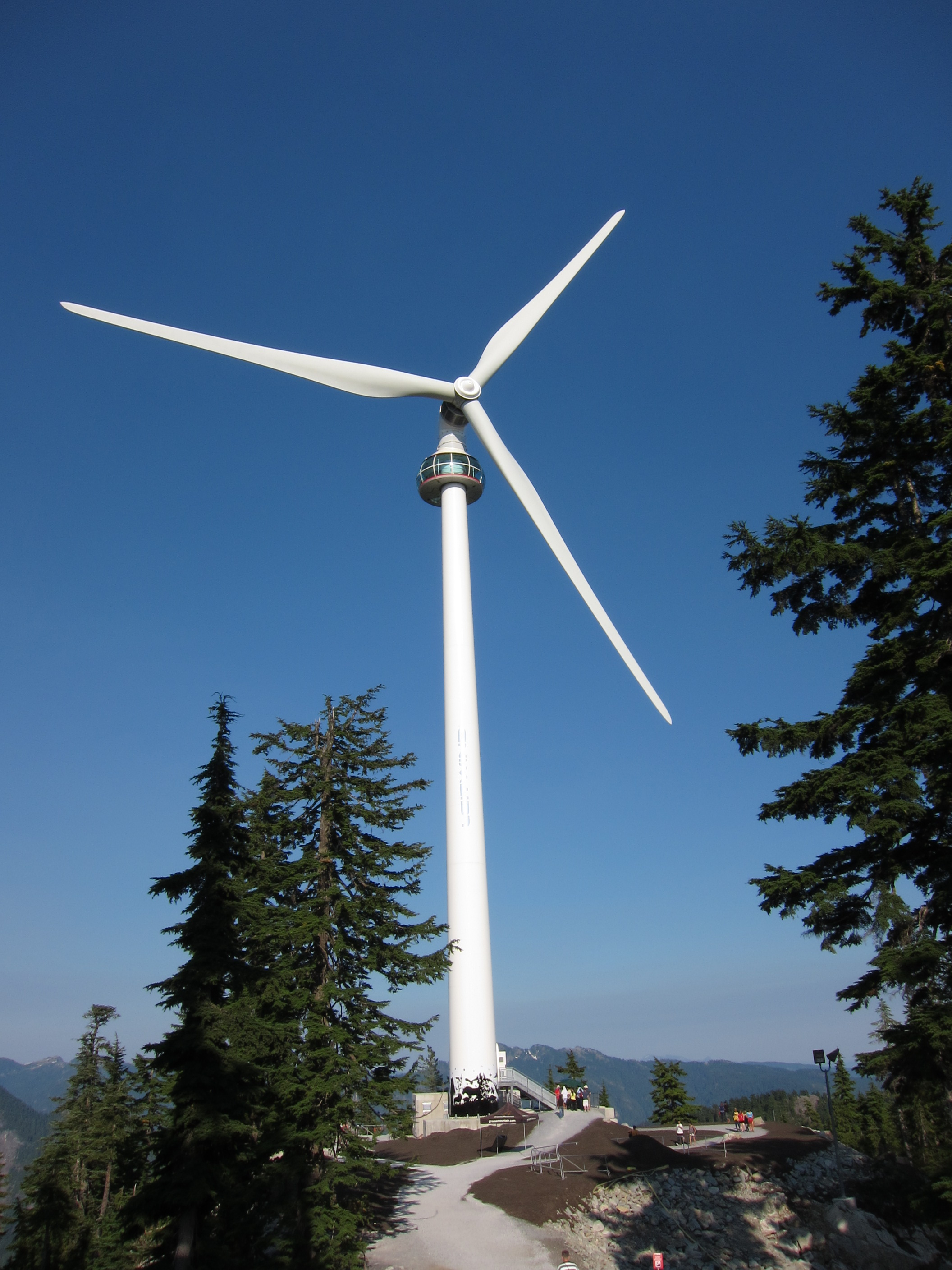
1.5 MW The Eye of the Wind at Grouse Mountain, Canada
