= Scroby Sands Wind Farm =

Offshore wind farm in the North Sea

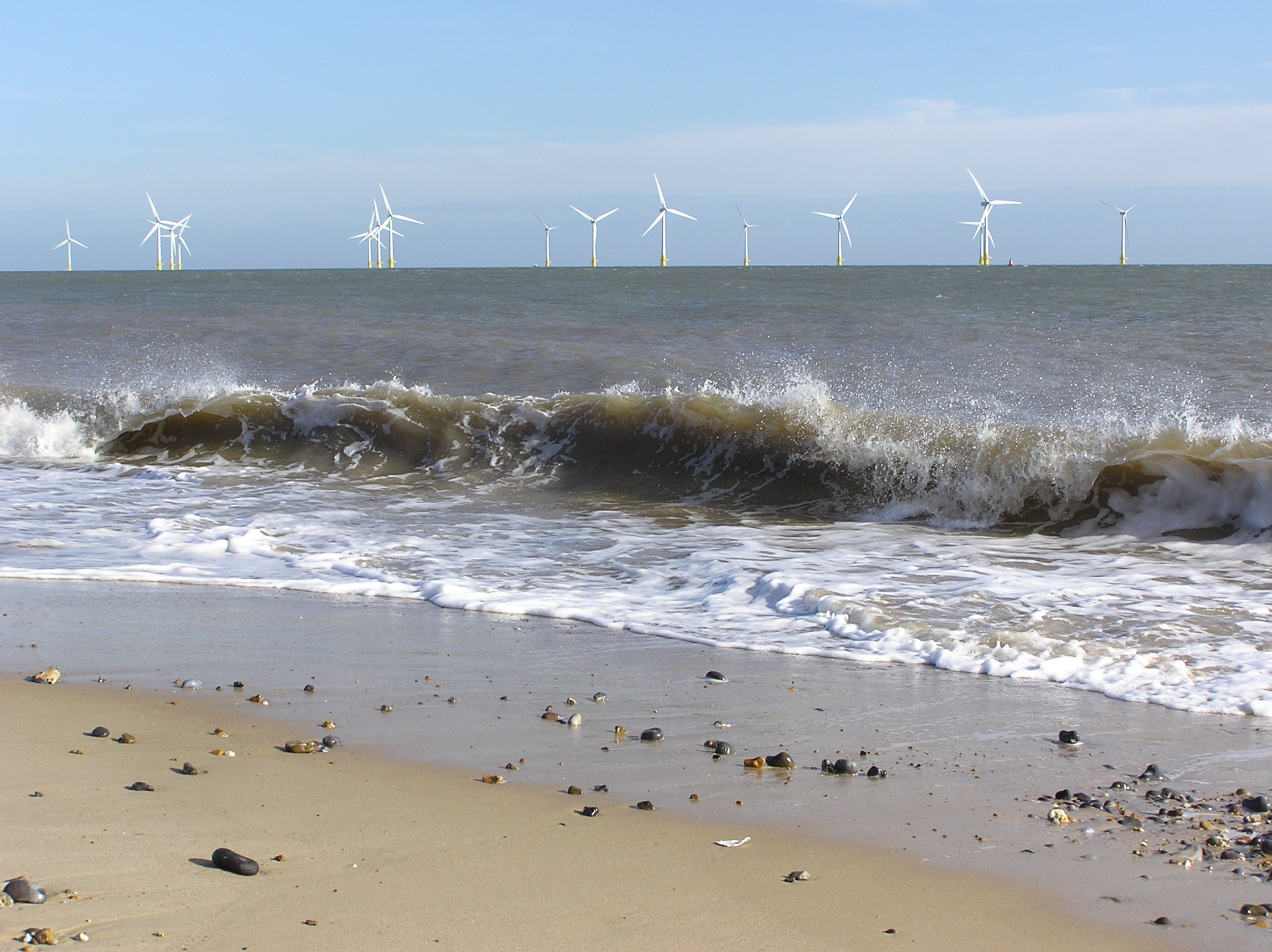
- Scroby Sands Wind Turbines
- Country: United Kingdom
- Location: off the coast of Great Yarmouth, Norfolk
- Coordinates: 52°38′56″N 1°47′25″E
- Status: Operational
- Commission date: December 2004
- Construction cost: €87 million
- Owner: RWE AG

Wind farm
- Type: Offshore
- Max. water depth: 5–10 m (16–33 ft)
- Distance from shore: 2.5 km (1.6 mi)
- Hub height: 68 m (223 ft)
- Rotor diameter: 80 m (260 ft)
- Rated wind speed: 16 m/s (58 km/h)

Power generation
- Units operational: 30 × 2 MW
- Make and model: Vestas V80 (30)
- Nameplate capacity: 60 MW
- Capacity factor: 32.42% (2012)

External links
- Commons: Related media on Commons
- Location within England

Wind farm layout

The Scroby Sands Wind Farm is a wind farm located on the Scroby Sands sandbank in the North Sea, 2.5 kilometres (1.6 mi) off the coast of Great Yarmouth in eastern England, United Kingdom. It was commissioned in March 2004 by Powergen Renewables Offshore, a division of E.ON UK. It has a nameplate capacity of 60 megawatts and is able to produce power to supply 41,000 households. Between 2005 and 2010, its capacity factor was between 26 and 32%. Its levelised cost has been estimated at £105/MWh.

The farm consists of 30 wind turbines, located in water from 13 to 20 metres (43 to 66 ft) deep. Each turbine has three 40-metre (130 ft) blades that rotate around a centre-point some 60 metres (200 ft) above the mean sea level. The hollow 4.5-metre (14.8 ft) diameter steel masts that carry the turbines are piled as much as 30 metres (98 ft) into the sea bed, to provide stability on a substrate of shifting sands. These shifting sands have piled up and decreased water depth, blocking access from service vessels. An amphibious vehicle is being built to drive on the sand to gain access to the turbines.

The wind turbines were designed and manufactured by a Danish firm, Vestas. Each turbine has a capacity of 2 megawatts. Turbines were installed by the Danish offshore wind farms services provider A2SEA.

In August 2023 one of the turbines caught fire.

== Tourism ==
The wind farm has an information centre serving around 35,000 visitors per year, and has become a local attraction. In June of 2018, Eon refurbished the property, with new exhibits and interactive displays, among other branding changes.
As of February 2023, the Visitor Centre has been Permanently Closed and vacated by Eon. It was believed to have closed in late 2019, and the reason is unknown.

== Gallery ==
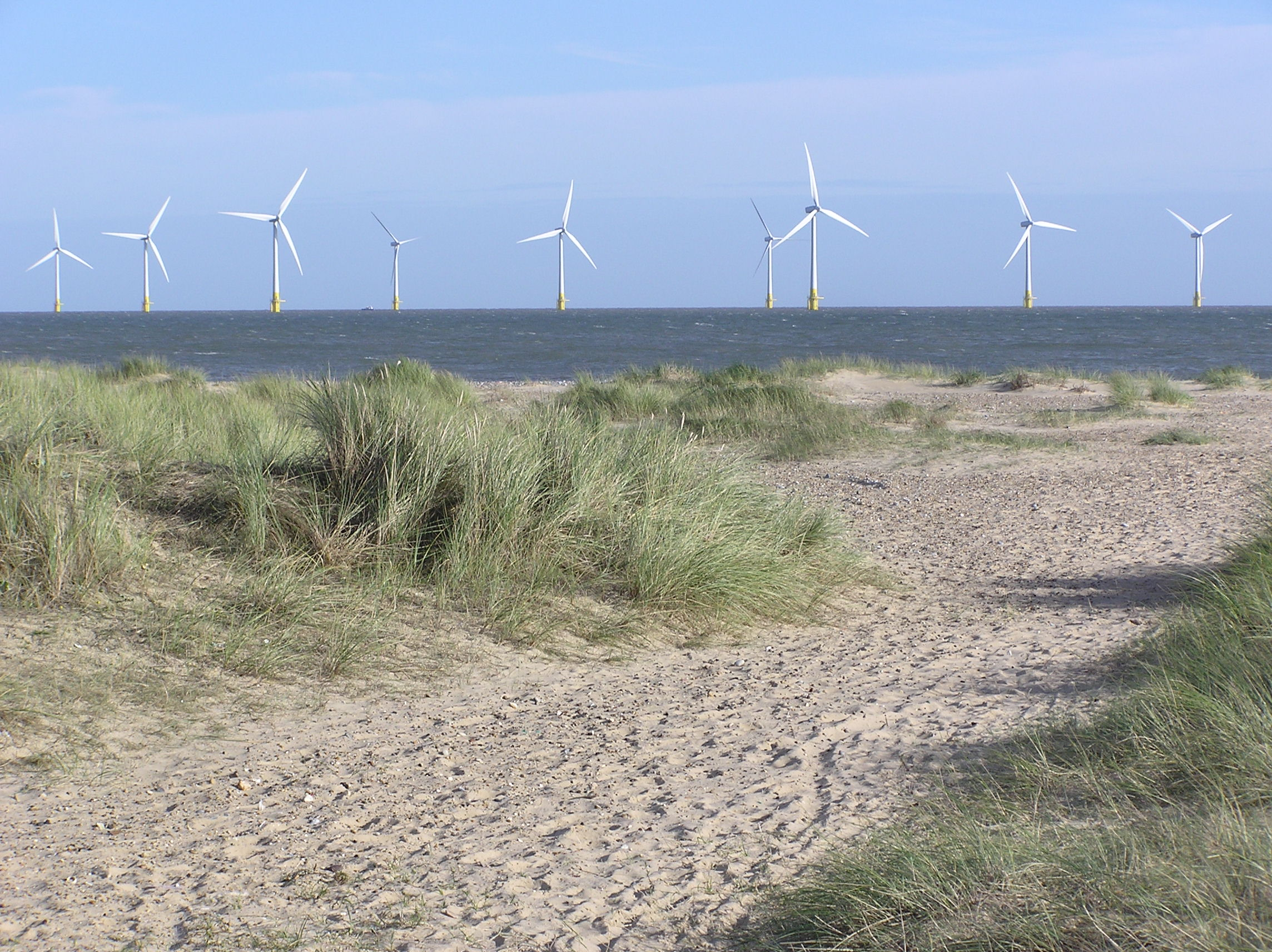
Wind farm seen from Great Yarmouth

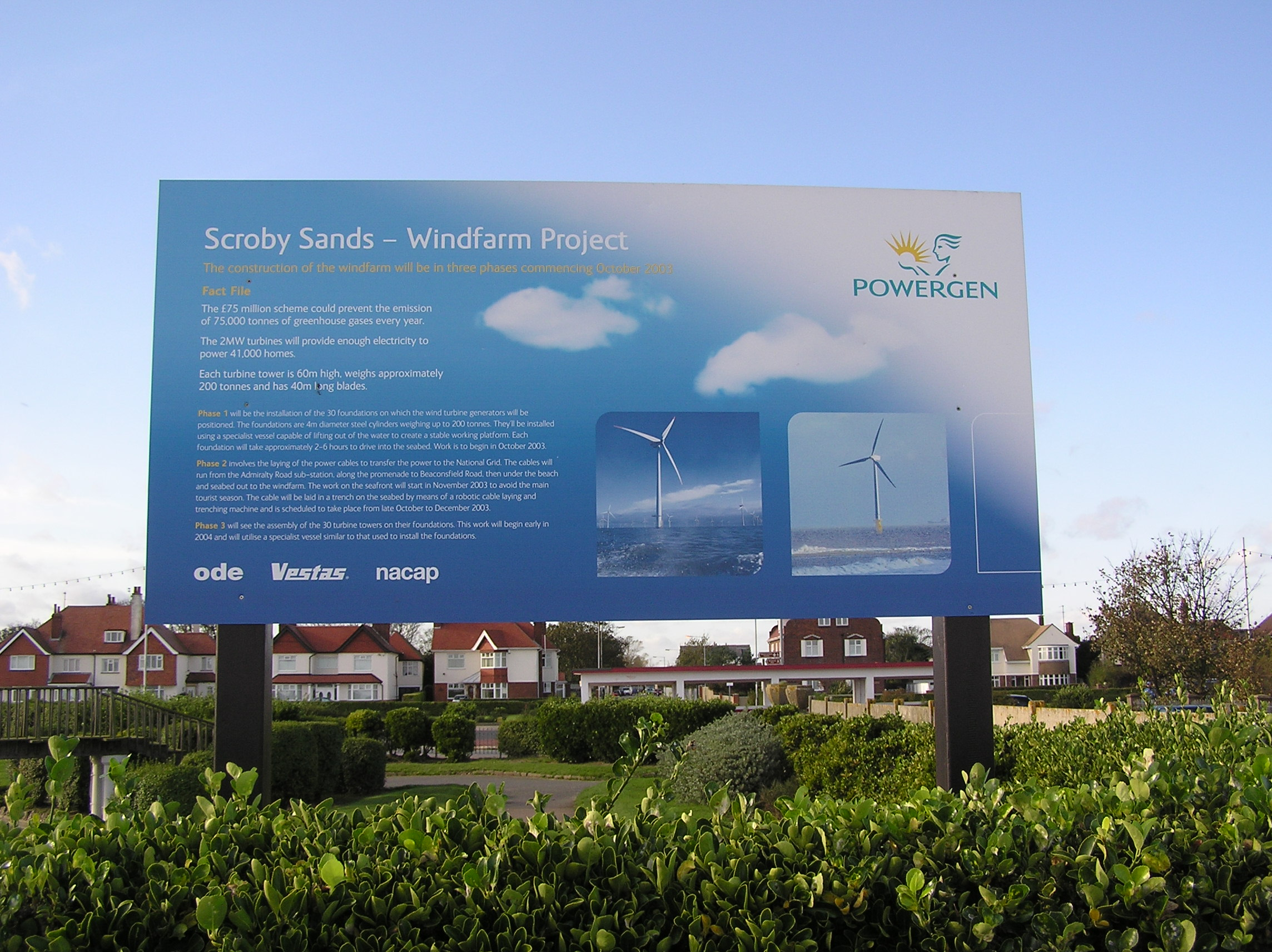
Information board at Great Yarmouth

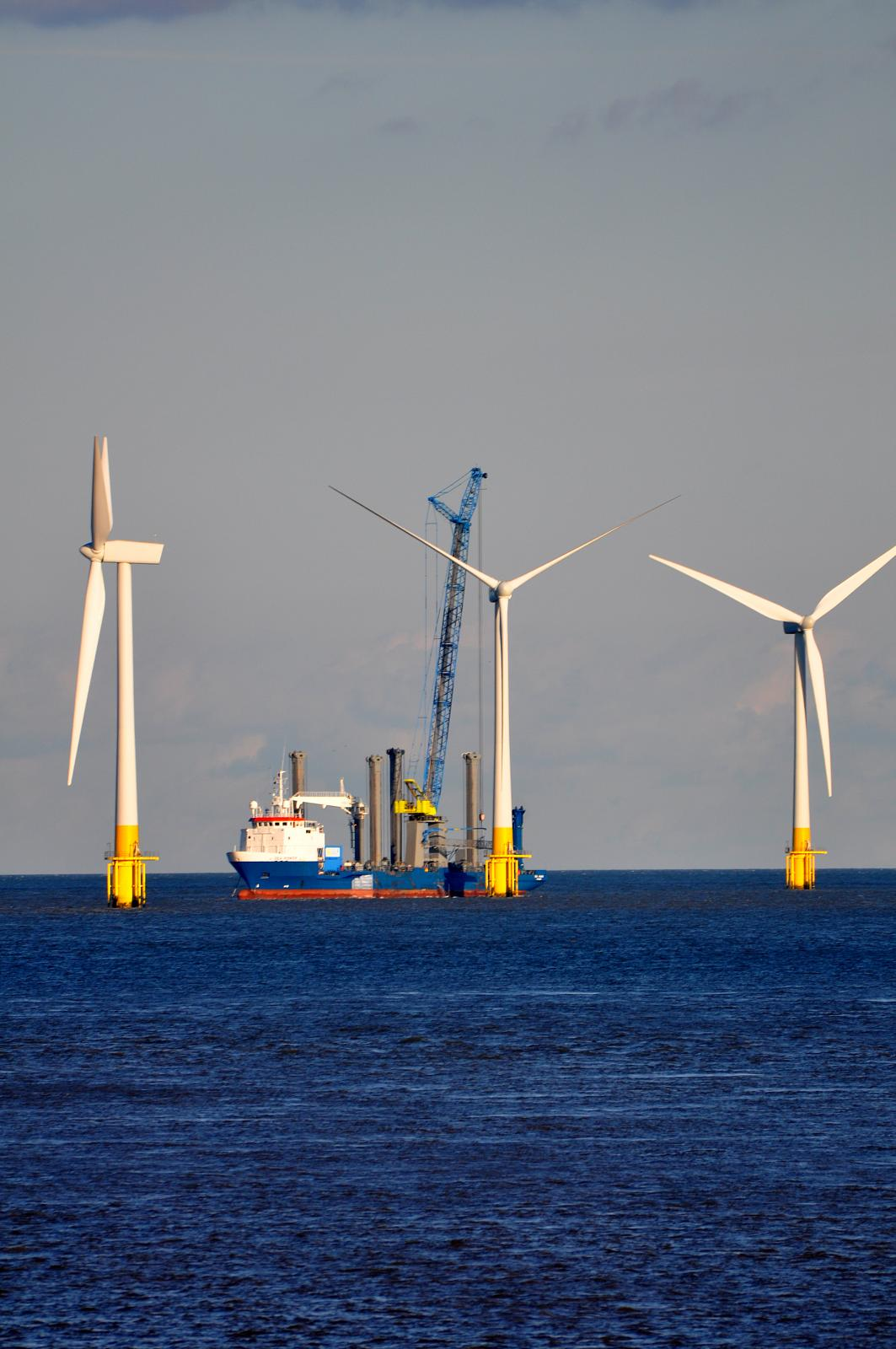
A Jackup rig servicing one of the wind turbines

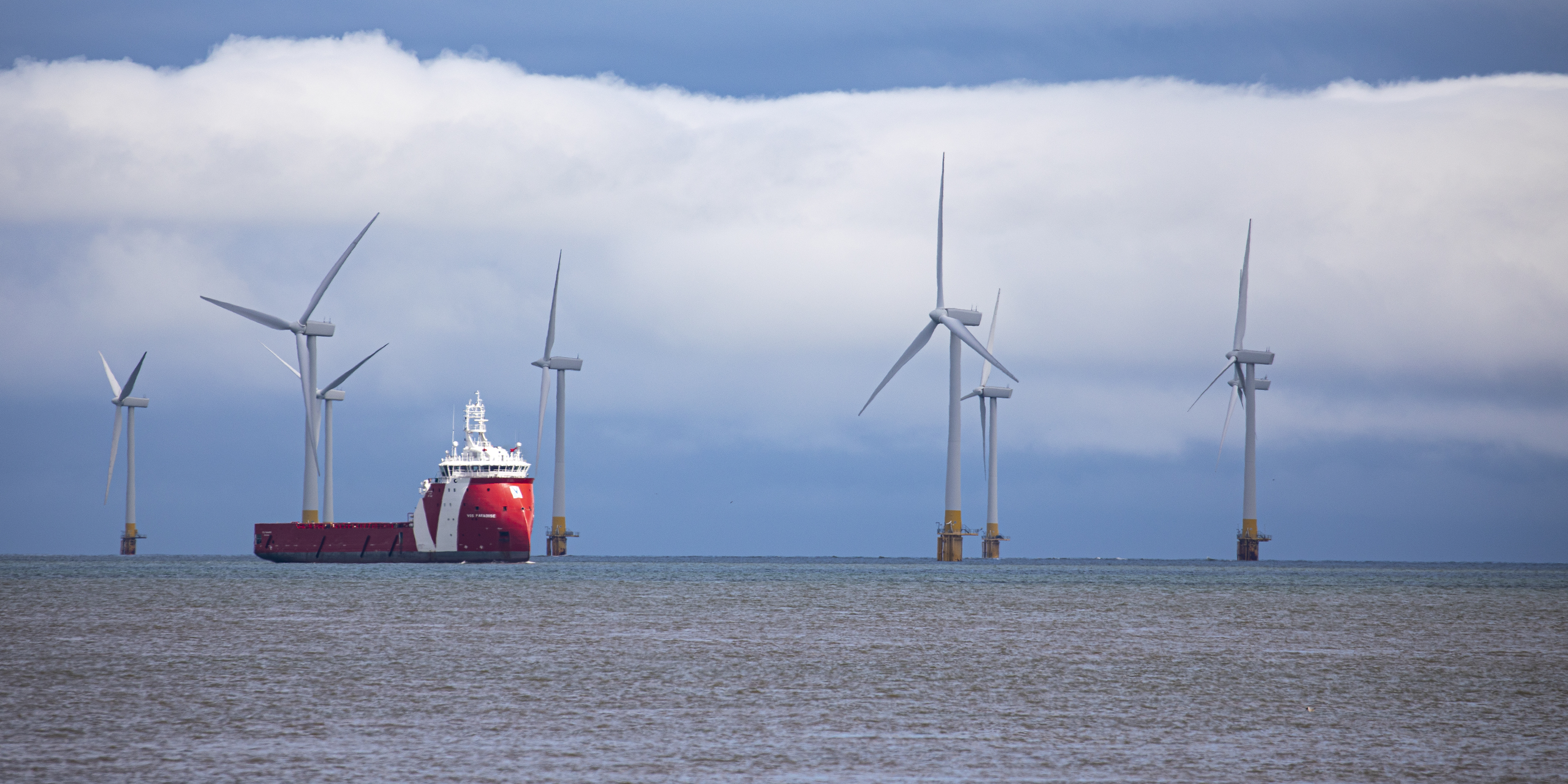
MV Vos Paradise in front of Scroby Sands wind farm

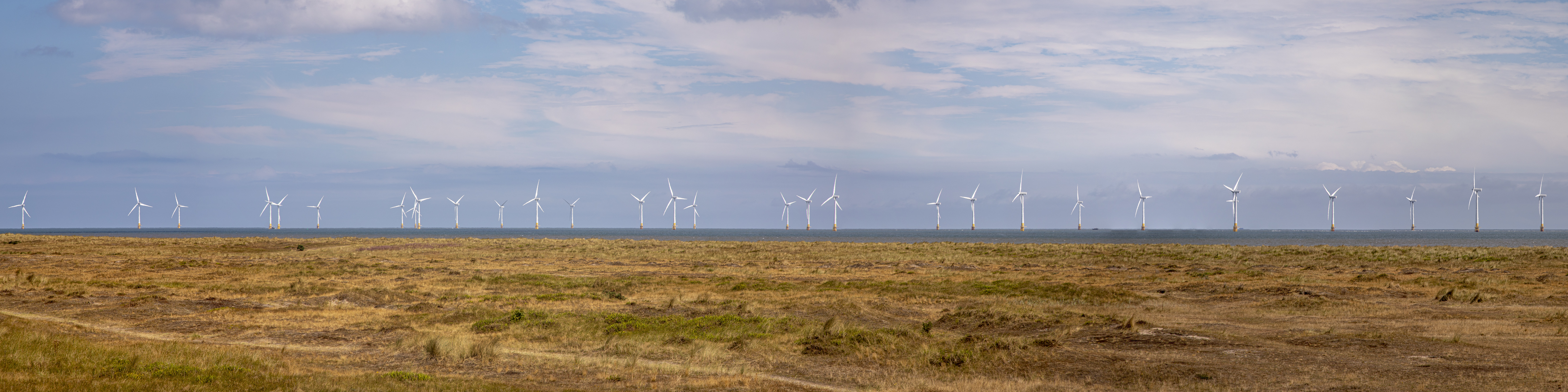
Scroby Sands wind farm panorama

== See also ==
- Wind power in the United Kingdom
- Sheringham Shoal Offshore Wind Farm
- List of offshore wind farms
- List of offshore wind farms in the United Kingdom
- List of offshore wind farms in the North Sea
