= American Windmill Museum =

Museum in Lubbock, Texas

Coordinates: 33.579342°N 101.823408°W

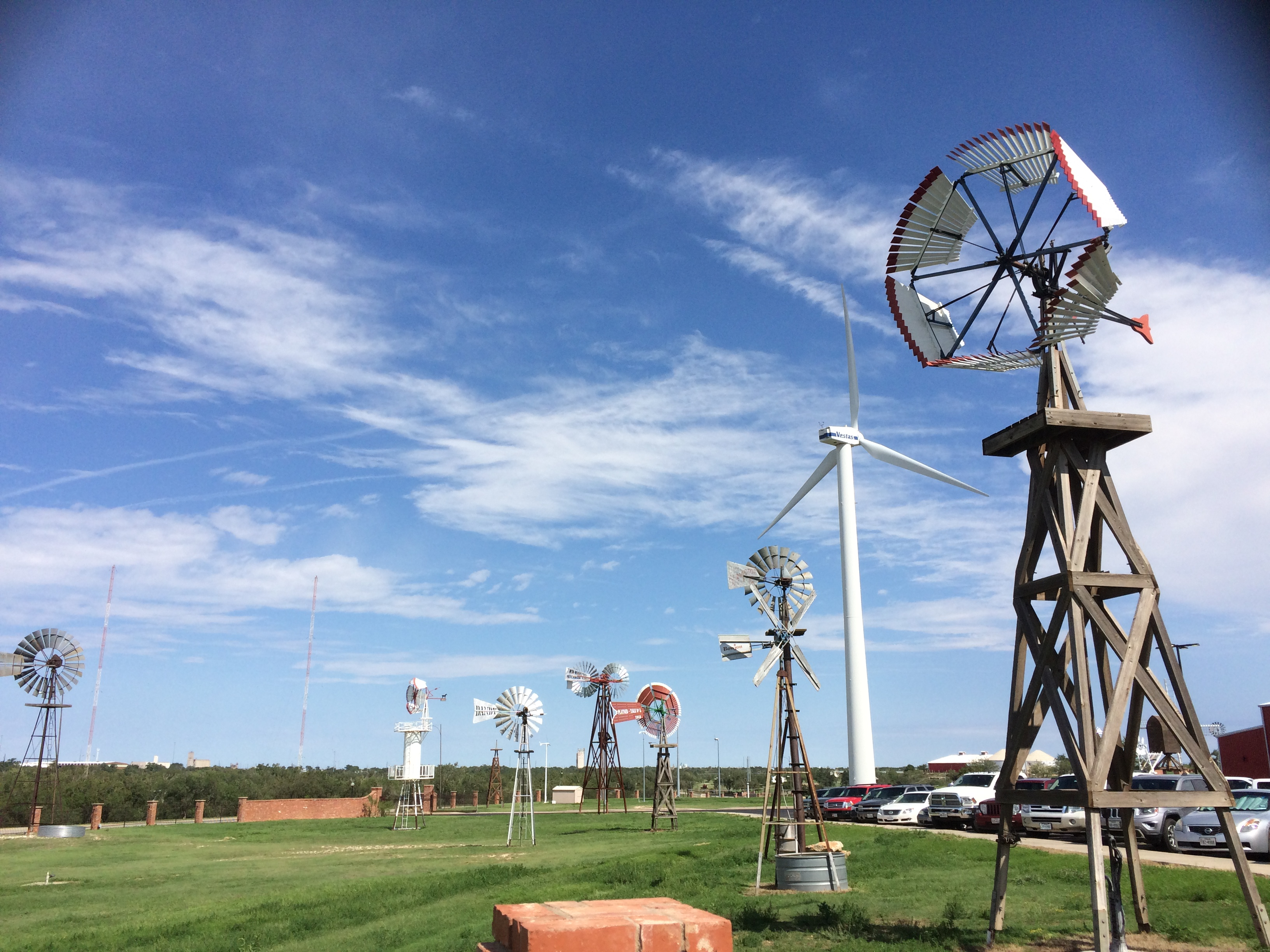
- American Windmill Museum
- Location: Lubbock, Texas, Texas, United States
- Website: Official site

The American Windmill Museum, formerly known as the American Wind Power Center, is a museum of wind power in Lubbock, Texas. Located on 28 acres (110,000 m^{2}) of city park land east of downtown Lubbock, the museum has more than 160 American style windmills on exhibition.

== History ==
The center was established in 1993 by Miss Billie Wolfe and Coy F. Harris. Wolfe, a faculty member at Texas Tech University, began searching for windmills in the early 1960s. She photographed and documented windmills across the nation and encouraged people to save what windmills were still standing. Thirty years later, there had been several individuals who had restored a number of early mills and Wolfe located one of these in Mitchell, Nebraska. By this time, Harris was working with Wolfe and he arranged, disassembled and moved this collection of forty-eight rare windmills to Lubbock.

These windmills remained in storage until 1997, when the City of Lubbock authorized an area of land for the museum. Harris and volunteers moved the collection to this new site. Windmills were erected on the grounds and inside a modest exhibit building.

In 1999, a much larger building became available, and Harris directed the movement of this building to the park site. He redesigned part of the "metal fabrication building" to better fit the windmills.

== Presently ==
At the present time, there are more than a hundred rare and historic water pumping windmills displayed inside. Another sixty windmills are erected on the grounds with many pumping water.

Complementing the water pumping windmills are wind electric machines. Some of these date to the early 1920s. Dominating the windmill grounds is a Vestas V47 wind turbine. This 660 kW turbine stands on a 50-meter tower and provides (on a yearly average) all of the power required by the museum facility. Excess energy is sold to the local power grid.

On June 22, 2016 the center opened a new 33,000 sq ft (3,100 m^{2}) addition that houses a 4,000 sq ft (370 m^{2}) "G" scale train display featuring the early 1900s scenery when windmills and trains were life sources for each other. There are historic wind turbines on display, some of which date back to the 1920s. This wing of the museum also houses the Alta Reeds miniature house collection.

== Gallery ==
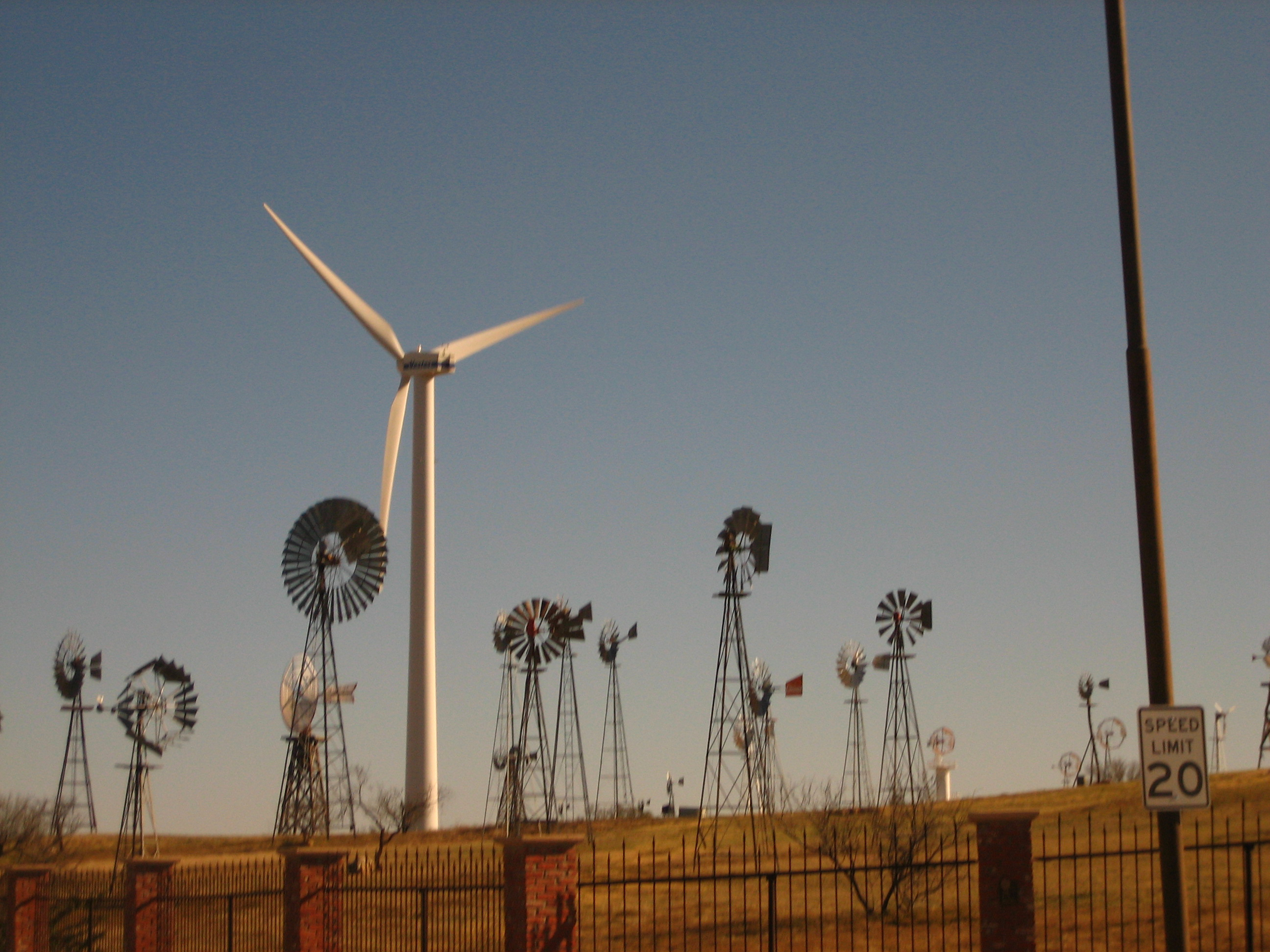
Windmills on display at the American Wind Power Center

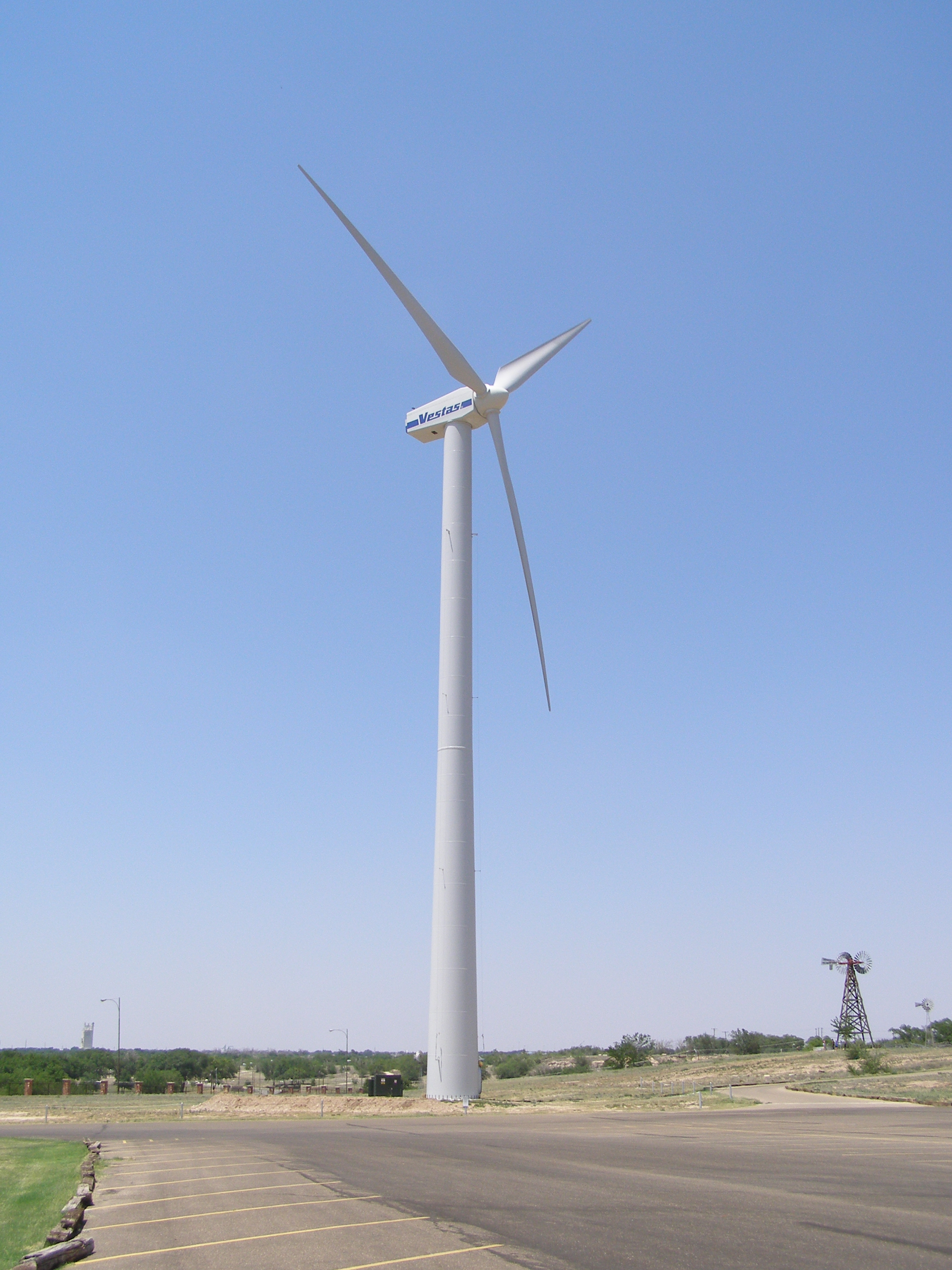
Vestas V47 wind turbine

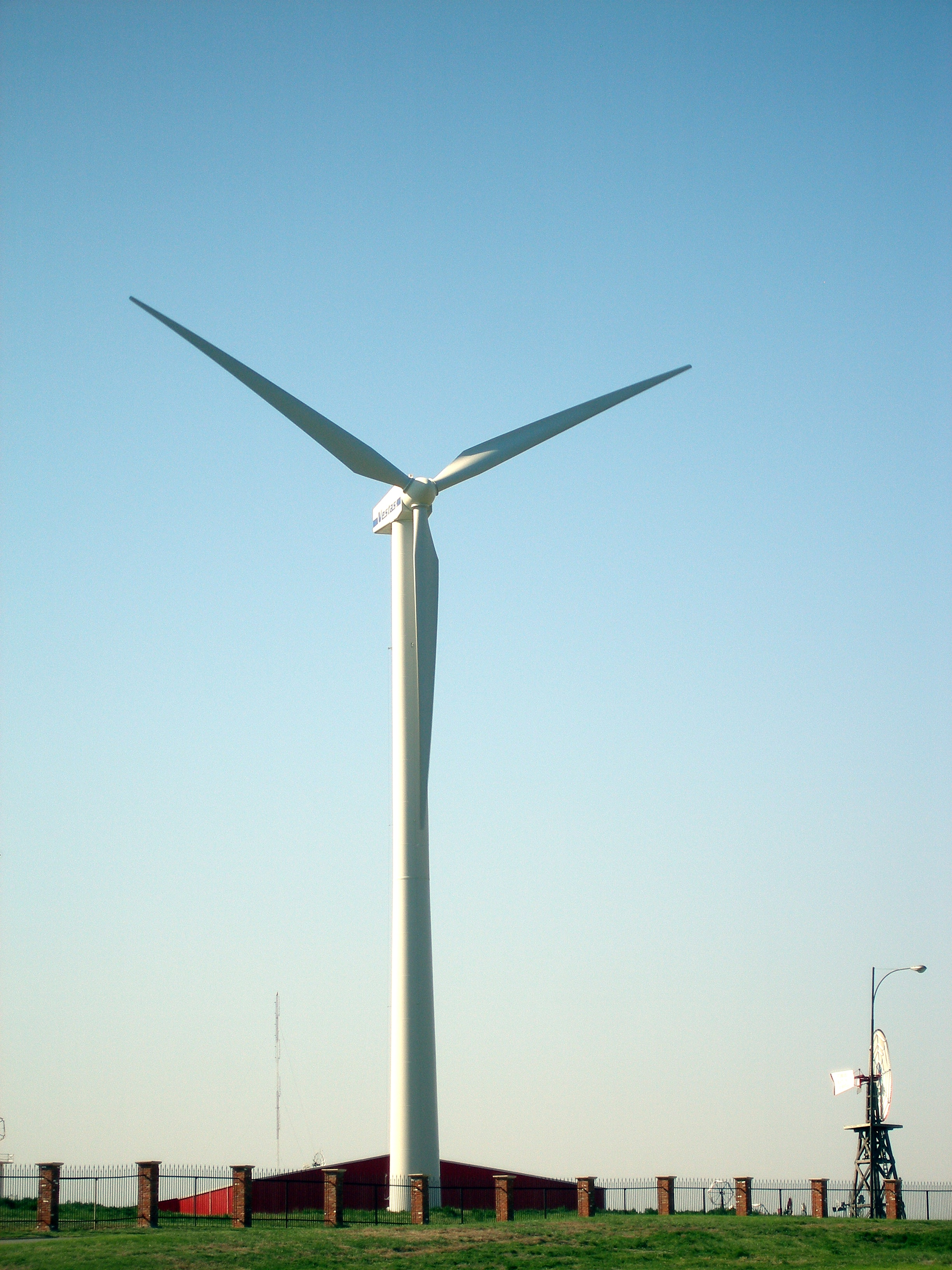
Another wind turbine

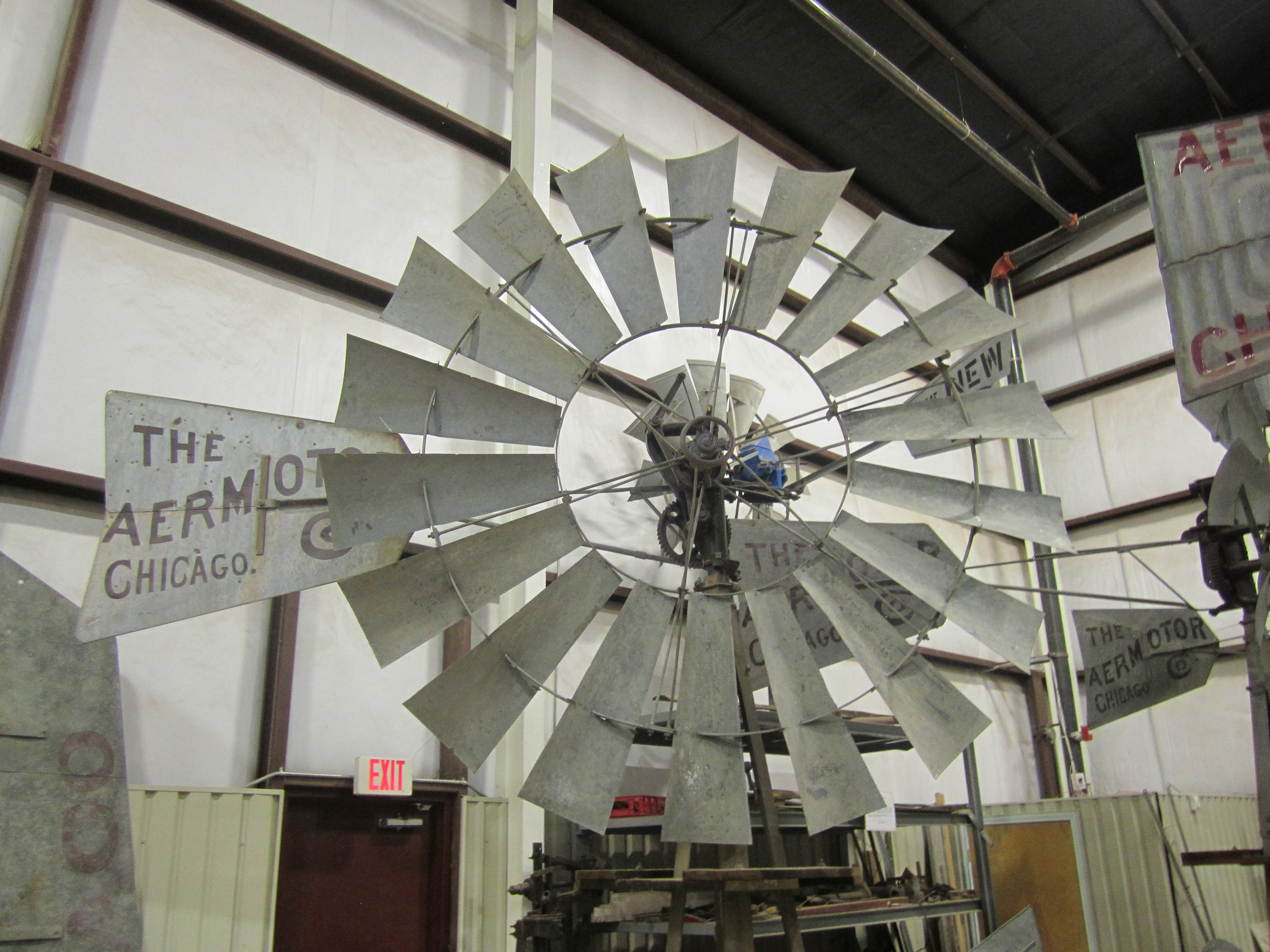
Aermotor Windmill, originally built in Chicago, is the only American brand still manufactured. It is produced at a plant in San Angelo, Texas.

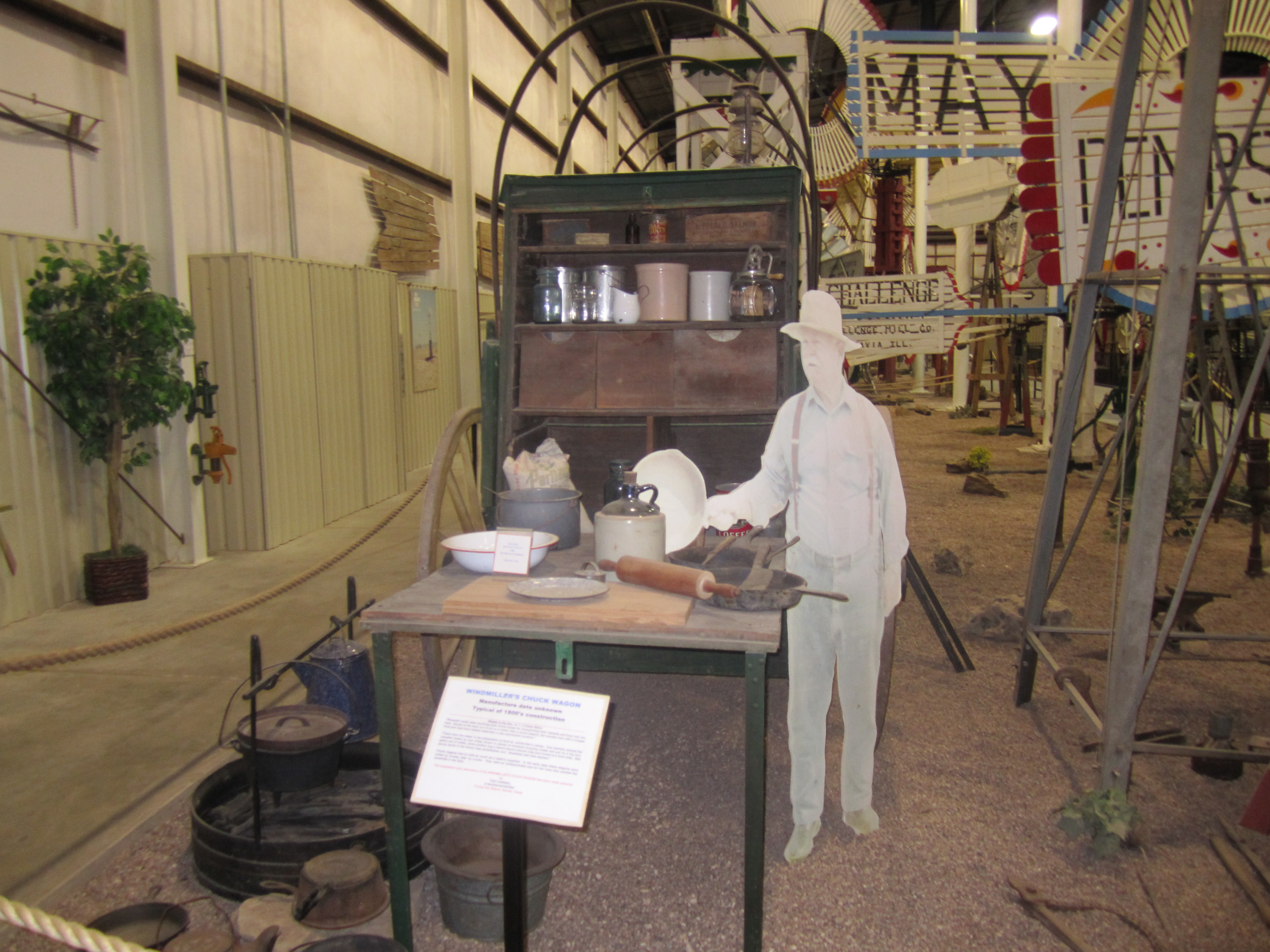
Chuckwagon exhibit at Wind Power Center

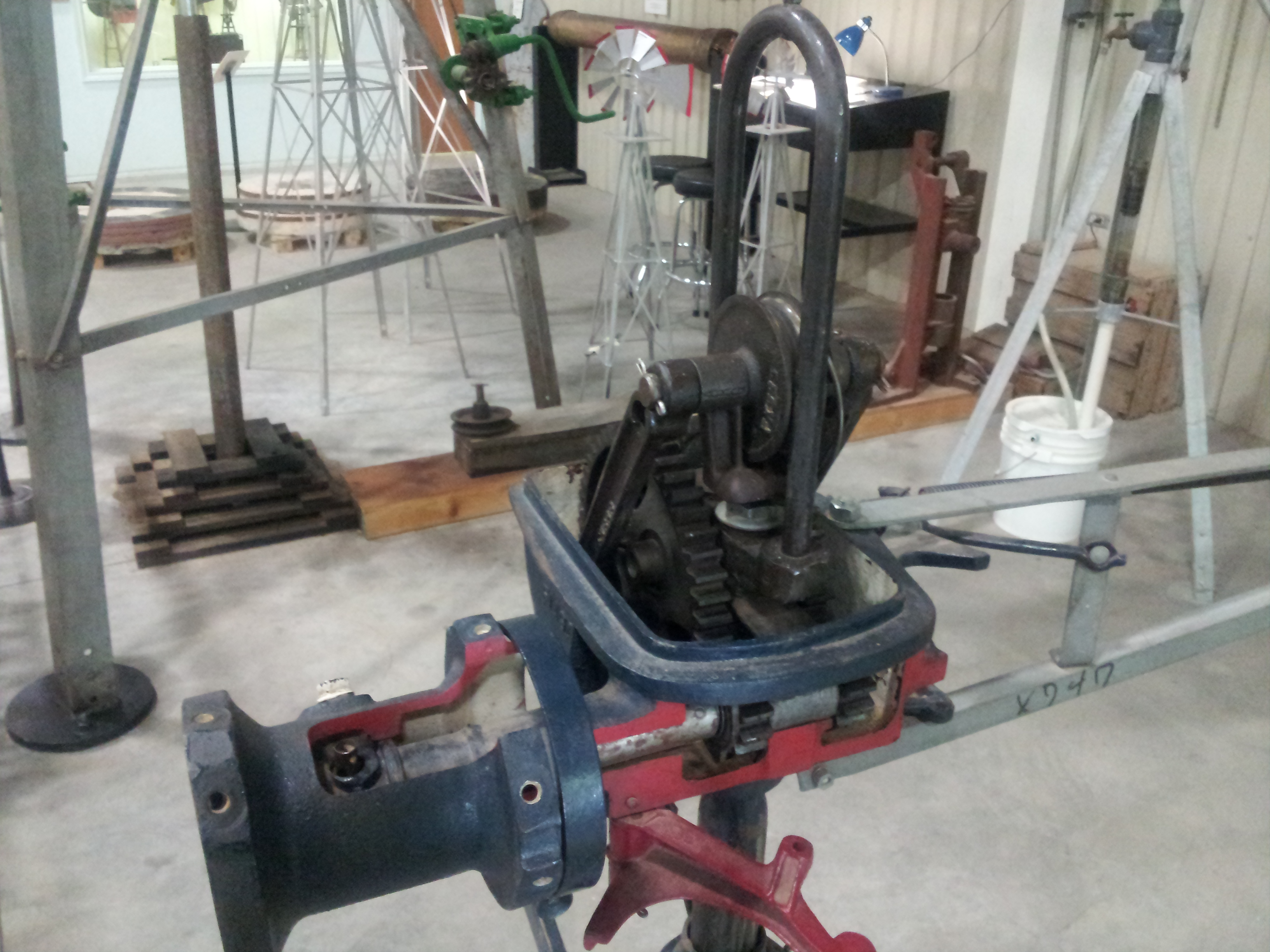
Windmill gears

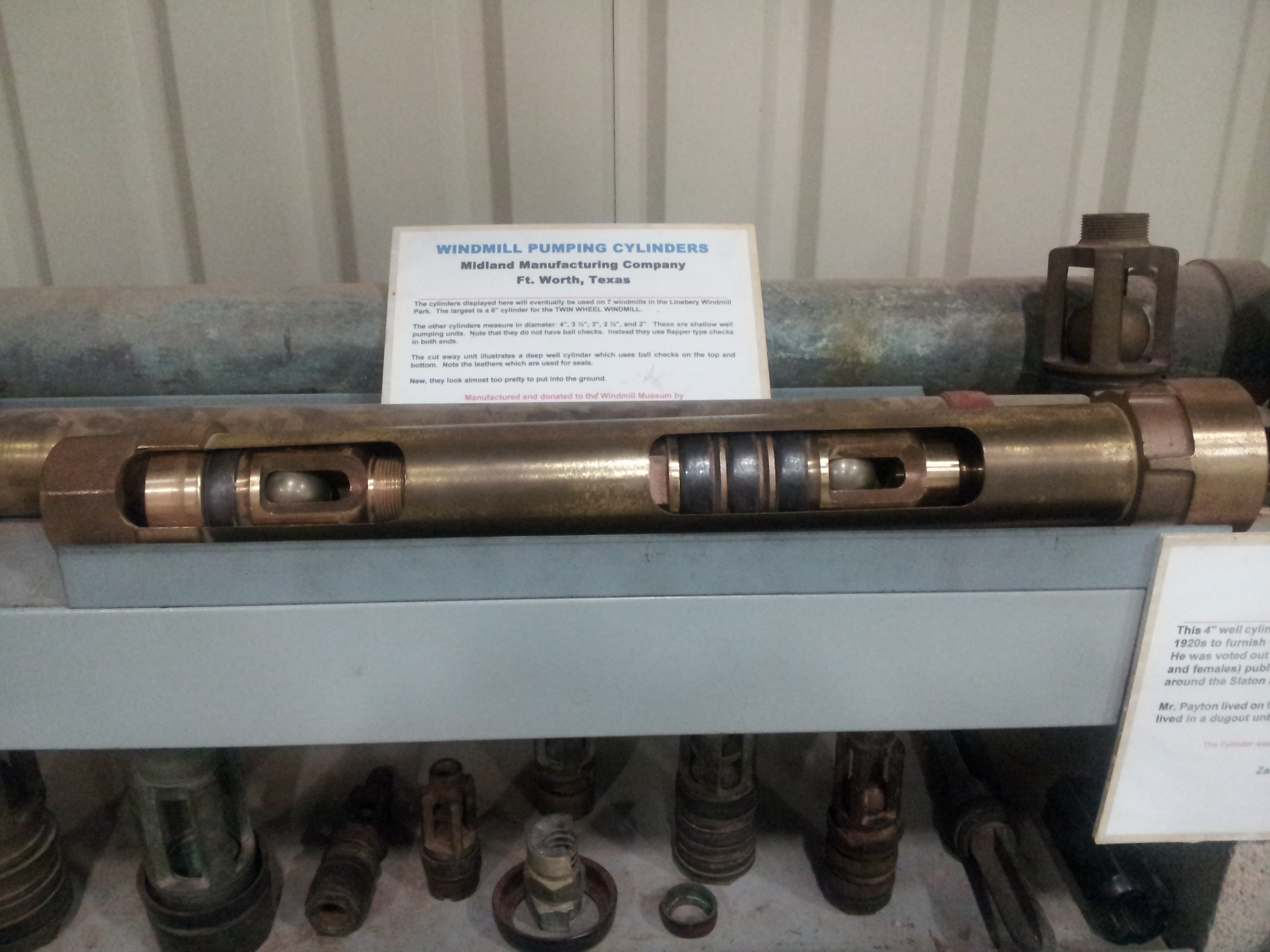
Windmill pump

== See also ==
- Wind power in Texas
