= List of offshore wind farms in China =

China has the world's largest capacity of offshore wind power, with 25 GW operational as of mid 2022. Offshore wind in China is growing rapidly, with 16.9 GW added during 2021.

== List ==
This is a list of operational offshore wind farms in China (within the national maritime boundaries) with a capacity of at least 100 MW. The name of the wind farm is the name used by the energy company when referring to the farm. It is usually related to a shoal or the name of the nearest town on shore.

List of offshore wind farms in China with a capacity of at least 100 MW
Name	Coordinates	Capacity (MW)	Capacity factor	Turbines	Depth range (m)	Distance to shore (km)	Commissioned	Cost	Owner	Refs.
Zhuanghe		1350					2021			
Shanwei Jiazi I+II		900		Mingyang			2022	unsubsidized	China General Nuclear	
Shanwei Houhu		500		Mingyang			2022		China General Nuclear	
SPIC Binhai North H2	34.500°N 120.360°E	400		100 × Siemens/Shanghai Electric SWT-4.0-130	15-18	22	2018			
Yangxi Shapa III		400 (+5.5 MW floating)	31%	1.7 GW combined					Three Gorges	
Huaneng Rudong H6		400	25%	100 × 4			2021		Three Gorges	
Yangjiang Shapa Phase 2	Shapa Town, Yangxi	400	31%	62 × 6.45	27-32	28	2021			
Huaneng Rudong	32.680°N 121.323°E	300		70 × 4.3			2017			
Yangjiang Shapa Phase 1	Shapa Town, Yangxi	300		55 × 5.5MW	27-32	28	2019			
Dongtai IV	Dongtai, Jiangsu	300		75 × 4MW	6		2019	CNY 8b ($1.25b) IV+V		
Jiangsu Dafeng H8-2	Maozhusha, Dafeng	300		38 × 4.5 MW; 20 × 6.45MW		72	2022		Three Gorges	
Xiangshui demonstration	34.498°N 120.061°E	202		18 x Goldwind 3.0; 37 × Siemens SWT-4.0	8-12	8.4	2014-2016			
Rudong	32.52°N 121.288°E	200		25 × Siemens SWT-4.0; 25 x Envision 4 MW-136	0-9	5.5	2014-2016			
Dongtai V	Dongtai, Jiangsu	200		50 × 4MW			2021	CNY 8b ($1.25b) IV+V		
CGN Rudong demonstration		152		38 × Siemens 4.0-120			2014-2016			
Longyuan Rudong Intertidal	32°30′14″N 121°15′36″E	131		21 × Siemens 2.3-93; 6 × 1.5MW Sinovel various 2 × 3MW; 2 × 2.5MW; 6 × 2MW	0 - 8	4	2012	US$ 75 million		
Donghai Bridge	30°46′12″N 121°59′38″E	102		34 × Sinovel SL3000/90	7	16	2010	US$ 102 million		
Guishan	22.126°N 113.729°E	198		34 x 3 MW; 15 × 5.5 MW			2018			
Shanghai Lingang Demonstration - 2		101		28 × Sewind W3600-122-90 3.6 MW	5-7	10	2016			
SPIC Binhai North H1	34.400°N 120.200°E	100		25 × Siemens SWT-4.0-130	7-13	5	2014-2016			

== See also ==
- Wind power in China
- List of wind farms
- List of offshore wind farms
- Lists of offshore wind farms by country
- Lists of offshore wind farms by water area
