= Wind power in China =

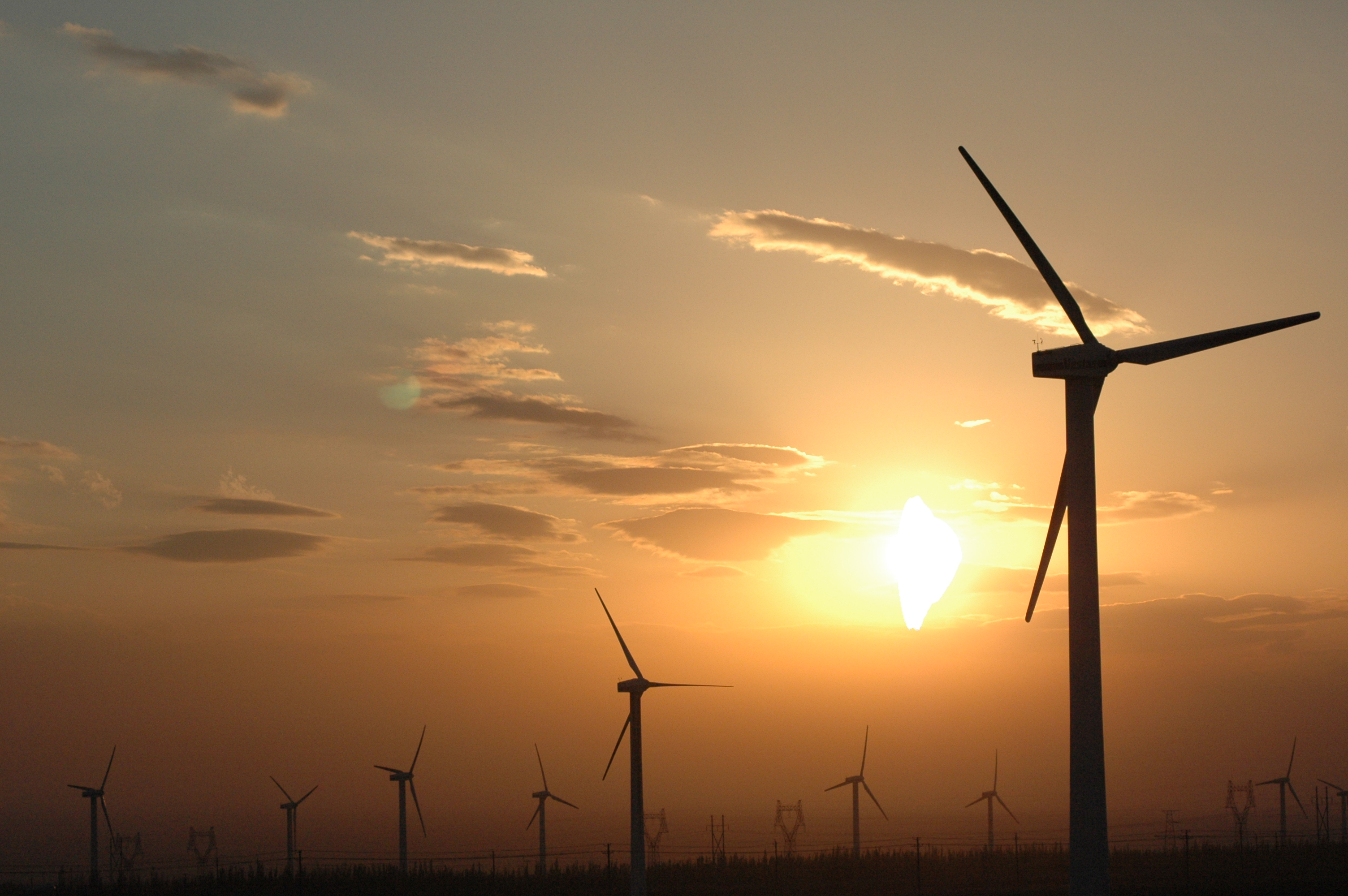

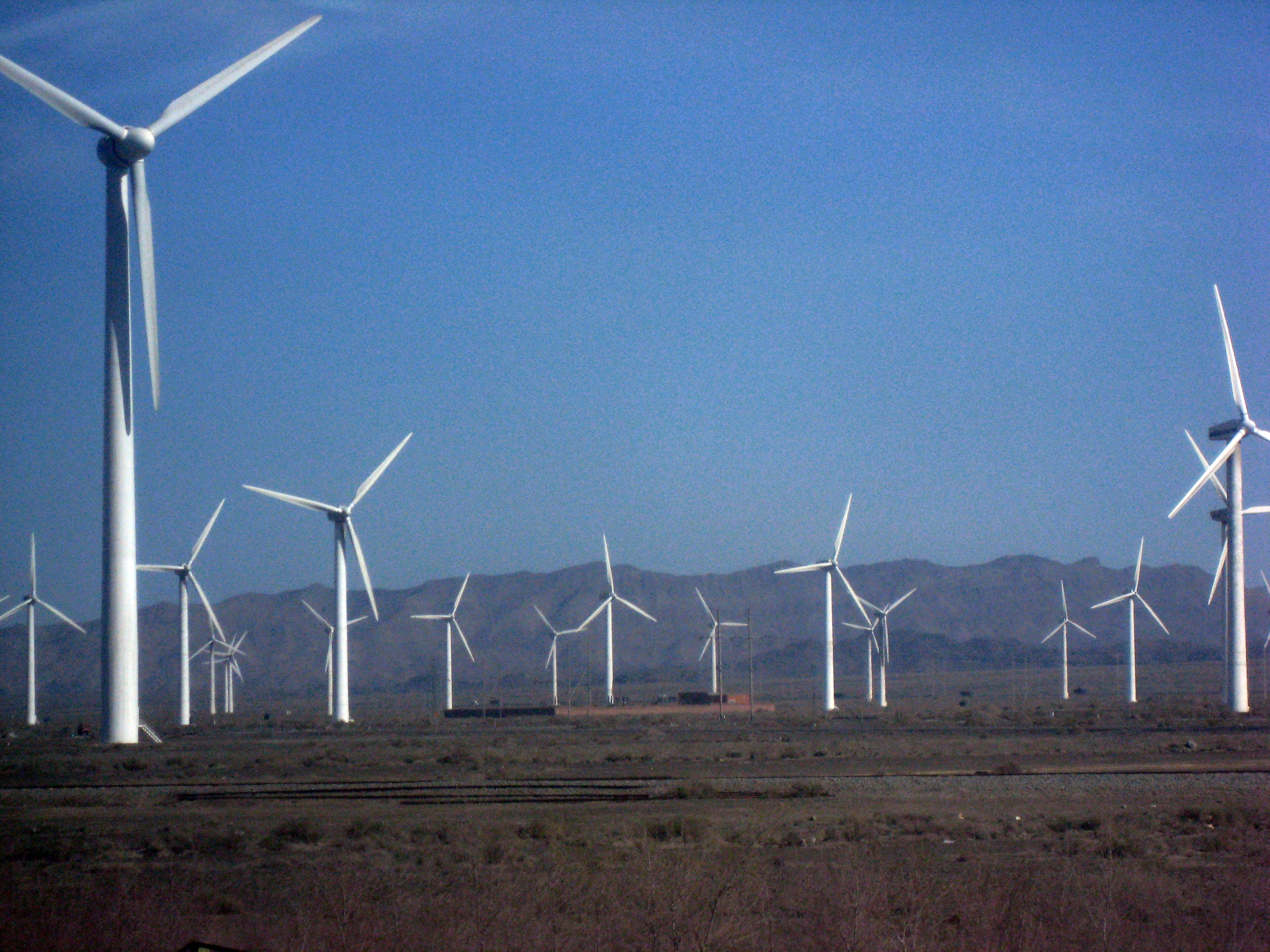
Wind farm in Xinjiang, China

China has the largest installed capacity of any nation and continued rapid growth in new wind facilities.

With its large land mass and long coastline, China has exceptional wind power resources: Wind power remained China's third-largest source of electricity at the end of 2021, accounting for 7.5% of total power generation.

In 2020, China added 71.6 GW of wind power generation capacity to reach a total capacity of 281GW. Both China's installed capacity and new capacity in 2020 are the largest in the world by a wide margin, with the next largest market, the United States, adding 14 GW in 2020 and having an installed capacity of 118 GW.

In late 2020, the Chinese government set out a road map for total installed capacity of wind and solar to be 1,200 gigawatts by 2030. This target was reached in 2024, six years ahead of the 2030 goal. China has identified wind power as a key growth component of the country's economy. Experts say that China can achieve carbon neutrality before 2060 and peak emissions before 2030.

According to a 2020 forecast by Fitch Solutions, wind generation is expected to reach approximately 1,000TWh in China by 2028 compared to previous forecasts of 870TWh, due to reduced project cost made feasible by upgrades in the efficiency of technology.

In 2021, China was responsible for almost 70% of new wind installed capacity while United States accounted at 14% and Brazil at 7%.

As of at least 2024, China is the world's largest wind power equipment manufacturing base. The largest domestic wind turbine manufacturer in China is Goldwind from Xinjiang province. Established in 1998, Goldwind aggressively developed new technology and expanded its market share, though this then decreased from 35% in 2006 to 19% in 2012. In 2019, Goldwind was one of the first partners to sign up for a wind-to-hydrogen project in northeast China, in the hopes of putting China's currently unused wind generation potential to good use and turn stranded wind power into a cheap energy source for hydrogen production. The China Longyuan Electric Power Group Corp., another subsidiary of China Guodian Corporation, was an early pioneer in wind farm operation; at one point it operated 40% of the wind farms in China.

== Installed capacity ==
Wind power generation in China (TWh)
Wind power installed capacity in China (GW)

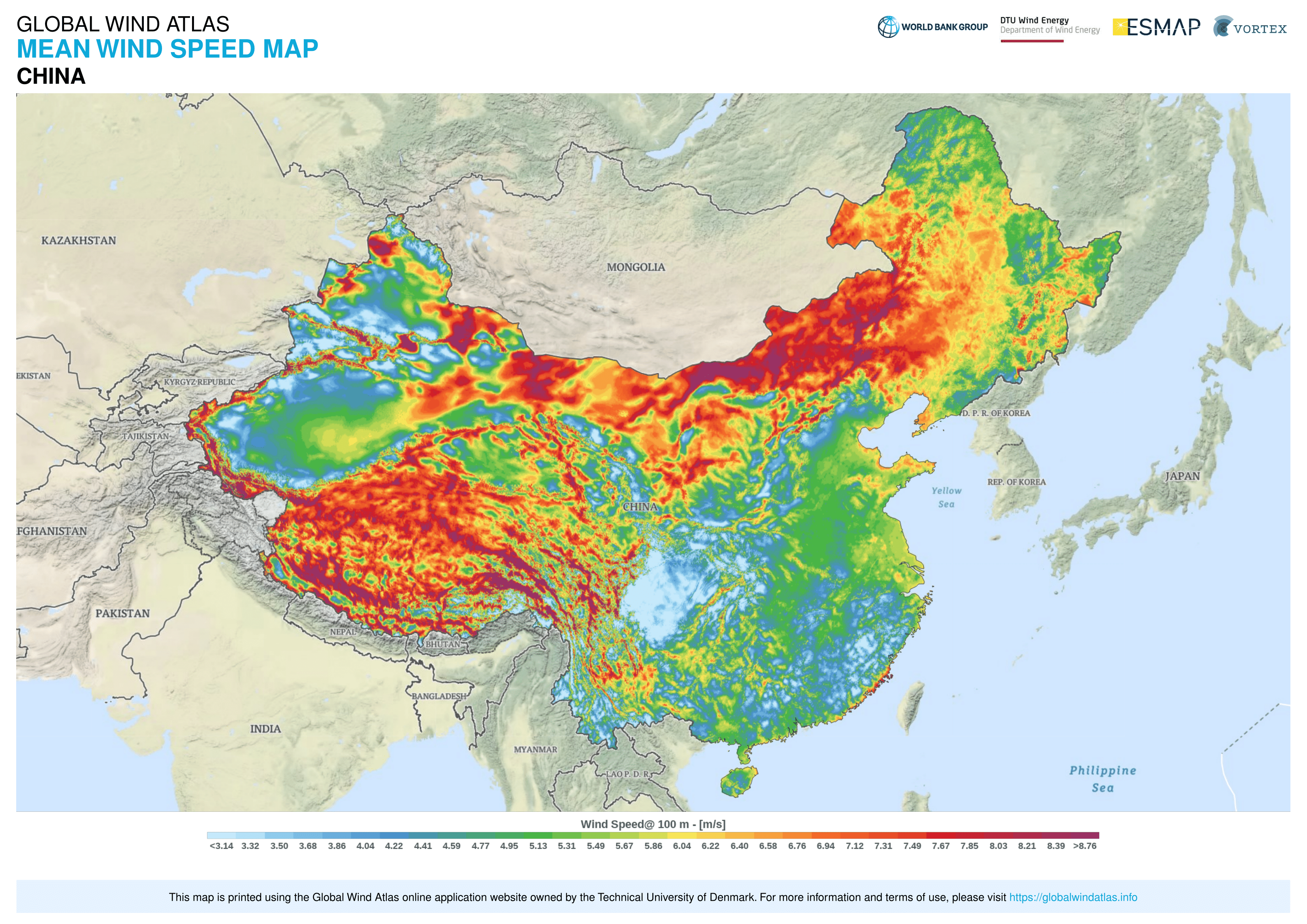
Mean wind speed in China

Between 2006 and 2009, China's wind power grew particularly quickly, with capacity doubling every year for four years in a row.

Wind power in China
Year	Capacity (MW)	Production (GWh)	Capacity factor
2005	1,260	1,927	17.5%
2006	2,599	3,675	16.1%
2007	5,912	5,710	11.0%
2008	12,200	14,800	13.8%
2009	16,000	26,900	19.2%
2010	31,100	44,622	16.4%
2011	62,700	74,100	13.5%
2012	75,000	103,000	15.7%
2013	91,424	134,900	16.8%
2014	114,763	153,400	15.3%
2015	129,700	186,300	16.4%
2016	149,000	241,000	18.5%
2017	163,670	305,700	21.3%
2018	184,260	366,000	22.7%
2019	210,050	405,700	22.0%
2020	282,650	466,500	18.8%
2021	328,480	655,600	22.9%
2022	365,960	762,700	
2023	442,900	885,900	

== History ==
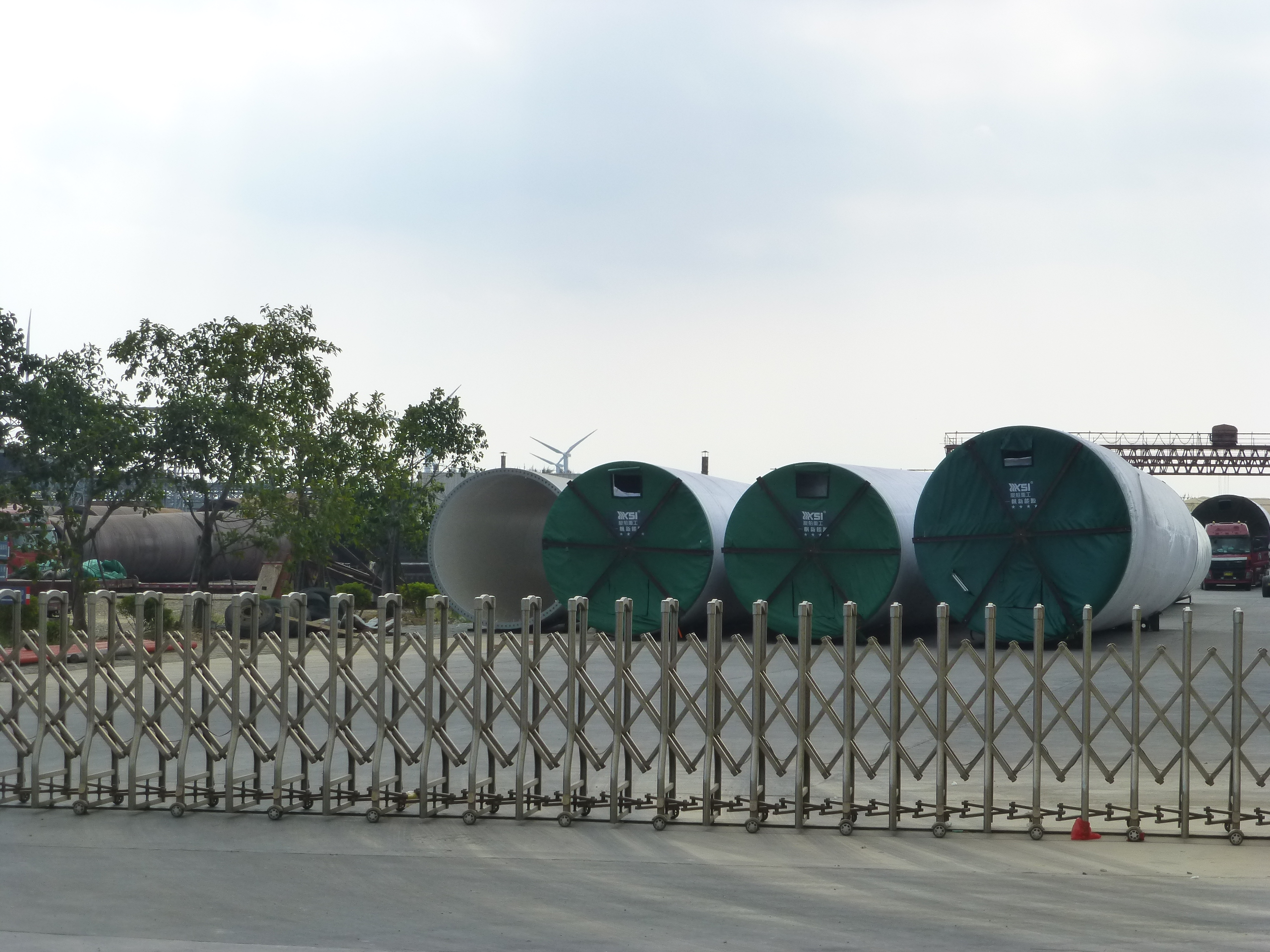
Wind turbine tower elements in an assembly facility in Liu'ao, Zhangpu County, Fujian

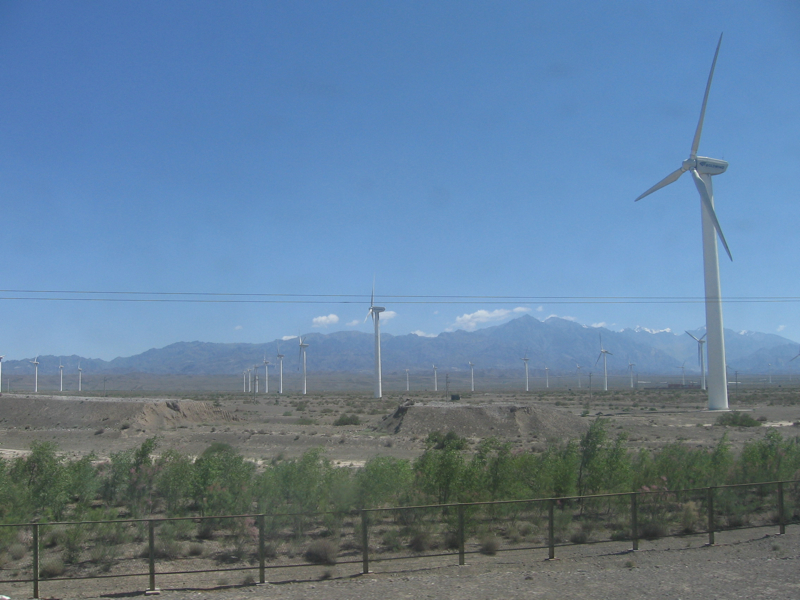
A Goldwind wind farm outside of Urumqi, Xinjiang

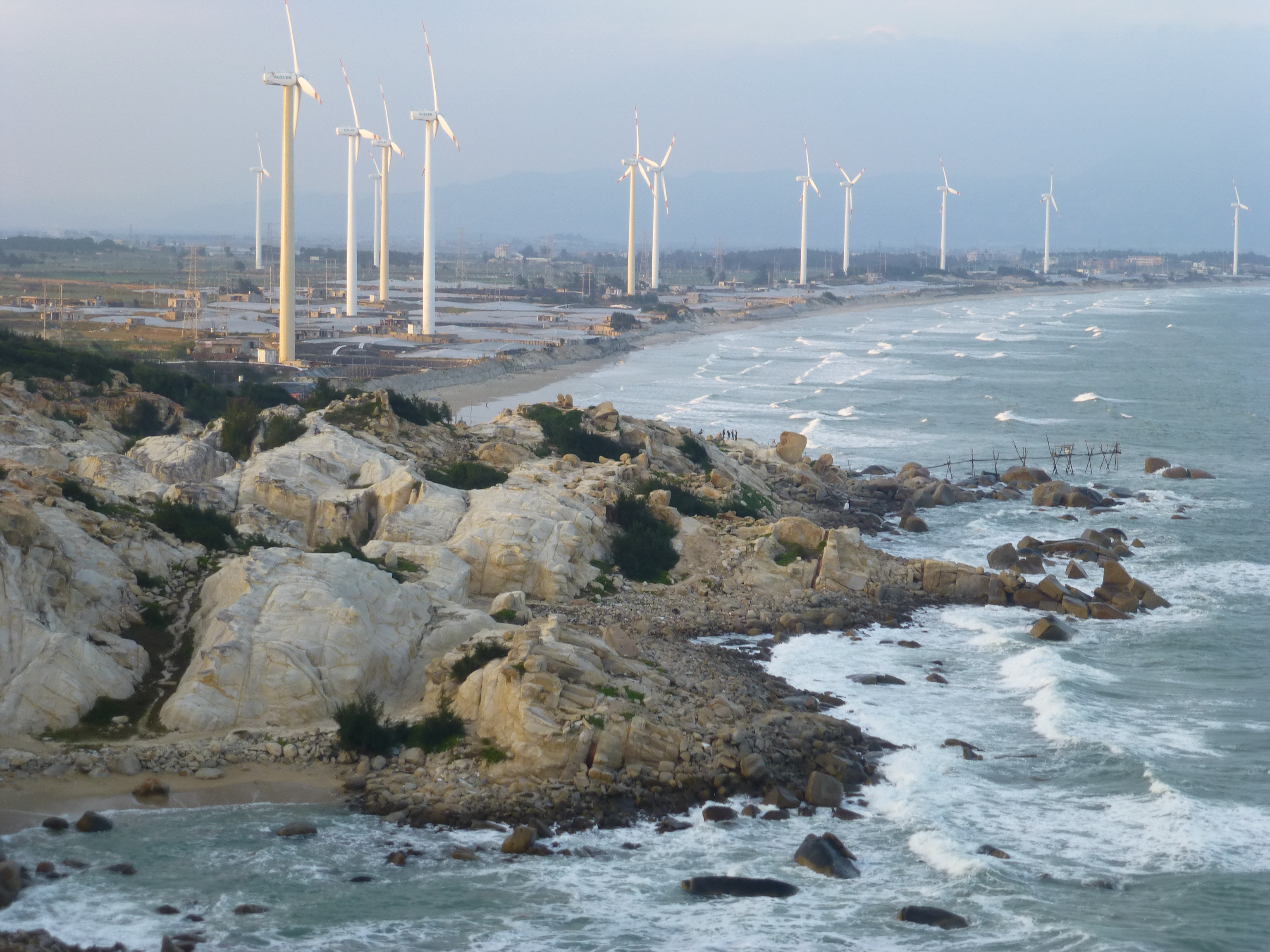
Wind power turbine towers in Liu'ao, near the "Abstract Art Gallery"

In 2005, the standing committee of the National People's Congress passed a law that requires Chinese power grid enterprises to purchase all the electricity produced by the renewable energy sector.

Chinese developers unveiled the world's first permanent Maglev wind turbine at the Wind Power Asia Exhibition 2006 held in Beijing.

The Zhongke Hengyuan Energy Technology company invested CN¥400 million in building the base for the maglev wind turbine generators, in which construction began in November 2007.

Zhongke Hengyuan expects a yearly revenue of CN¥1.6 billion from the generators.

In 2006 the Shanghai Power Company purchased 64.485 gigawatt-hours (GWh) of green energy (primarily from wind farms), yet the amount of renewable energy which was subscribed by customers from Shanghai Power Company was only 23% of that total. In 2006 there were just 6,482 households in Shanghai that subscribed to renewable energy in part because the cost of wind power is 0.53 Yuan/kWh higher than power produced from coal plants; in 2007 total output of wind farms in Shanghai will total 100 GWh, which is sufficient to power 120,000 households.

Though there were 22 entities that purchased renewable energy in Shanghai, though with the exception of 1/3 of that total being state owned enterprises, the remainder was foreign invested enterprises. Shanghai's city government did not purchase any renewable energy. Of the top ten power customers in Shanghai, only Bao Steel purchased renewable energy; in 2006 Bao Steel entered into an agreement to purchase 1.2 GWh over three years.

By the end of 2008, at least 15 Chinese companies were commercially producing wind turbines and several dozen more were producing components.

Turbine sizes of 1.5 MW to 3 MW became common.

Leading wind power companies in China were Goldwind, Dongfang Electric, and Sinovel along with most major foreign wind turbine manufacturers. China also increased production of small-scale wind turbines to about 80,000 turbines in 2008. Through all these developments, the Chinese wind industry appeared unaffected by the Great Recession, according to industry observers.

China became the largest wind energy provider worldwide in 2010, with the installed wind power capacity reaching 41.8 GW at the end of the year. However, about a quarter of this capacity was not connected to the grid.

In 2011, China put forth a plan to have 100 GW of grid-connected wind power capacity by the end of 2015 and to generate 190 terawatt-hours of wind power annually. This target was reached in 2014, making China the first country in the world to reach 100 GW of installed wind capacity.

As of 2014, Goldwind remains the largest competitor in the Chinese wind energy market, with a 19% share of new installations. It is followed by Guodian United Power Technology Company (a subsidiary of China Guodian Corporation) at 11%, and Mingyang Wind Power at 9%.

The Gansu Wind Farm Project in western Gansu province is one of six national wind power megaprojects approved by the Chinese government.

Although in some countries there are aesthetic objections to large-scale wind farms, in China they are often perceived as an aesthetic positive due to their associations with modernity and green development.

== Offshore wind ==
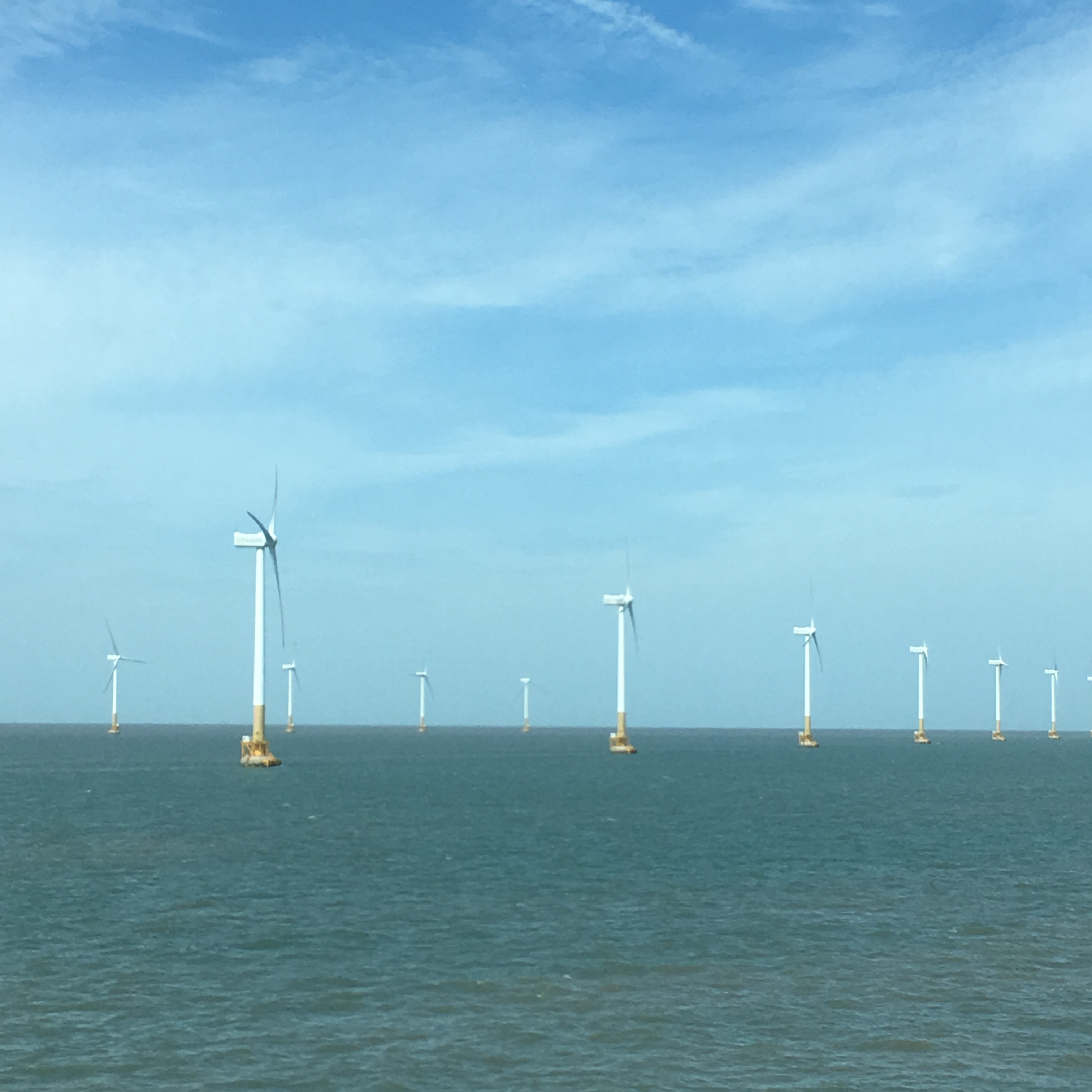
Donghai Bridge Wind Farm

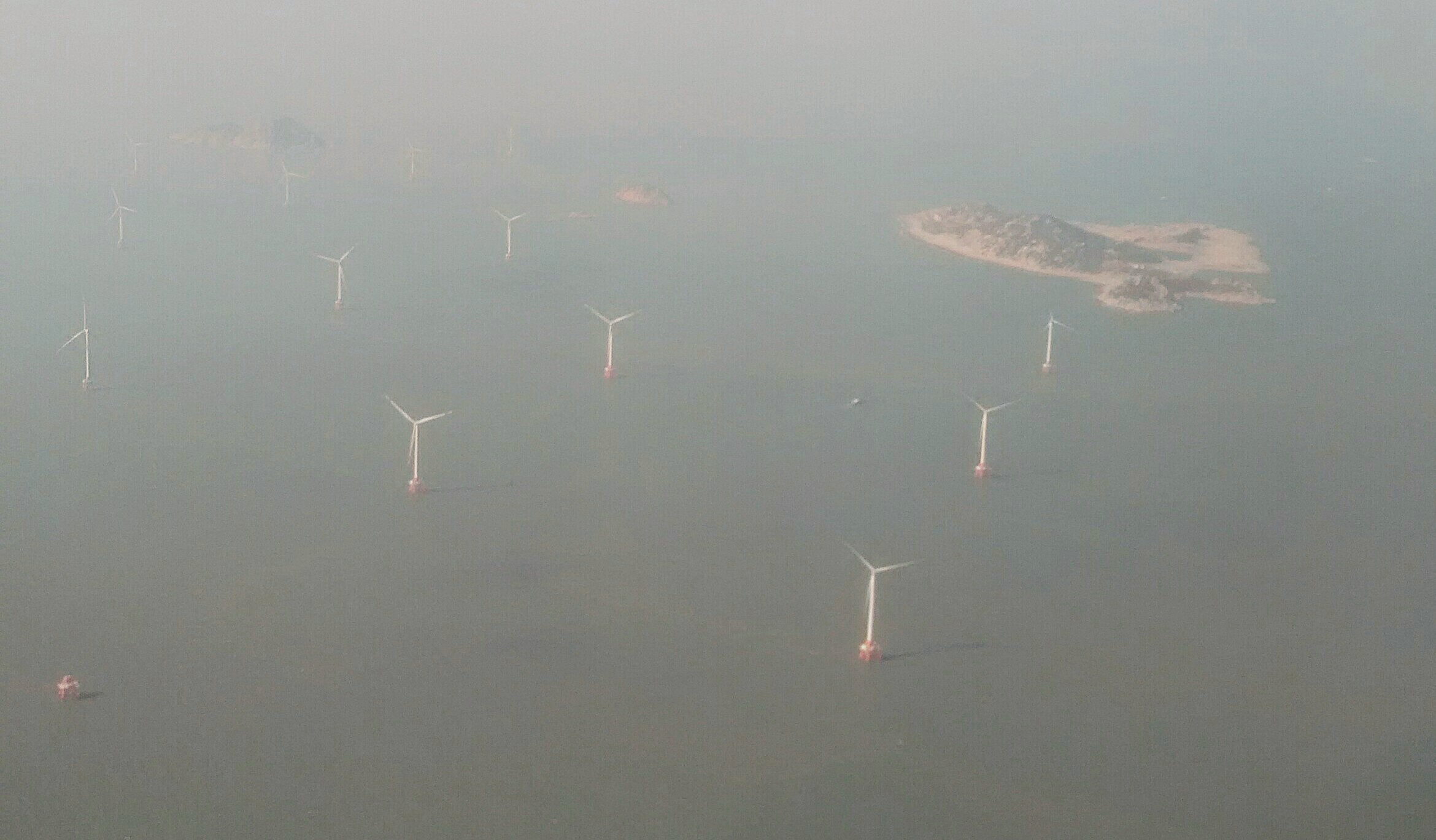
Guishan Offshore Windfarm, near Zhuhai in Guangdong province, China

Offshore wind power is a major part of China's clean energy development strategy. The country has a coastline measuring 18,000 kilometers long and is estimated to have up to 750 million kilowatts of offshore exploitable wind power resources. In 2012 China set the goal of 5 GW of installed offshore wind capacity by 2015 and 30 GW by 2020. However, development of offshore wind power did not come as fast as expected. Construction of Donghai Bridge Wind Farm, the first offshore wind farm in China started in April 2009, close to Donghai Bridge, and commissioned in 2010 to provide electricity to the 2010 Shanghai Expo. The wind farm consists of 34 Sinovel 3 MW wind turbines at a cost of US$ 102 million. The next is the 150 MW Longyuan Rudong Intertidal Wind Farm costing 500 million ¥, operational in 2012. By the end of 2012, China had only installed 389.6 MW offshore wind capacity, still far from the target goal of 5 GW by the end of 2015.

In May 2014, total capacity of offshore wind power in China was 565 MW, which raised to about 900 MW in 2015, less than a fifth of the expected target. Installations increased substantially in 2016, with 592 MW of offshore wind power capacity deployed, ranking third in the world behind Germany and the Netherlands. By the end of 2016, the total cumulative offshore wind power capacity in the country was 1.9 GW.

Offshore wind development's initial slower pace in China was mainly due to the lack of experience of domestic turbine manufacturers in the sector. This forced local development to use foreign products, resulting in Siemens being the largest supplier of offshore wind turbines in China. Another problem was the huge investment needed and associated risks of offshore development, which discouraged private companies.

On 5 August 2020, a new report revealed by the Global Wind Energy Council stated that China is expected to host more than a fifth of the world's offshore wind turbines, equating to 52 GW, claiming the top spot for the largest market for offshore wind by 2030.

In 2021 alone, China built more offshore wind capacity than the rest of the world had built in the last 5 years put together. It commissioned 16.9 GW of offshore wind capacity, which accounted for 80% of all new capacity in 2021 worldwide. That massive expansion had meant that China today operates almost half of the world's installed offshore wind, with 26 GW of a total of 54 GW worldwide.

As of the third quarter of 2024, China had 39.1 million kilowatts of offshore wind power connected to its national grid, ranking first globally. The country's offshore wind industry includes design, manufacturing, construction, operations, and maintenance. Offshore wind capacity grew from under 5 million kilowatts in 2018 to 37.7 million kilowatts by 2023, accounting for 50% of the global total.

In November 2024, China was reported to be developing the world's largest commercial floating offshore wind farm near Hainan. The 1-gigawatt (GW) project, undertaken by state-owned PowerChina, will be constructed in two phases: an initial 200 megawatts (MW) by 2025, followed by the remaining 800 MW by 2027. Unlike traditional offshore wind farms, which require fixed foundations, floating turbines allow deployment in deeper waters, where wind speeds are typically higher.

In May 2026, a subsidiary of China Communications Construction announced that they had turned on the world's first offshore wind-powered offshore data center off the coast of Shanghai in the Lin-hang Special Area. It uses a circulating heat exchange system that reportedly reduces electricity consumption. An estimated 95% of the power comes from the wind farm. The center consumes 2.3 MW.

== ues ==
External videos
- Access to mountaintops can be challenging.

Areas with great wind power potential such as Gansu are sometimes far away from established industrial and residential centers. Coal-fired plants have a constituency of miners and local governments which wind-power projects lack. This has led to power generated by wind remaining underused.

Transmission capacity of the grid hasn't kept up with the growth of China's wind farms. In 2009, only 72% (8.94 GW) of China's total wind power capacity was connected to the grid. In 2014, 96.37 GW of China's capacity was connected to the grid, out of a total capacity of 114.6 GW. In the first half of 2015, 1.75 TWh of wind power was wasted according to China's National Energy Administration. The slowdown in the Chinese economy in 2015 also led to overcapacity in the power sector, reducing demand. In an effort to reduce excess power capacity and encourage greater use of renewables, the Chinese government halted approvals for construction of new coal power plants for the three-year period starting in 2016. Combined curtailment of North China wind power was nearly 34 TWh in 2015.

In 2014, the US generated more electricity from wind (167 TWh) despite a lower generating capacity because of China's connectivity and grid capacity problems. According to a 2013 report in The Economist, the US produced 40% more energy from a similar capacity of wind power, because Chinese wind farms are not efficiently connected to the power grid.

A potential solution will be to move wind turbines to urban areas, but not without challenges. Shen et al. (2019) discover that Chinese city-dwellers may be somewhat resistant to building wind turbines in urban areas, with a surprisingly high proportion of people citing an unfounded fear of radiation as driving their concerns. In addition, the study finds that like their counterparts in OECD countries, urban Chinese respondents are sensitive to direct costs and to wildlife externalities. Distributing relevant information about turbines to the public may alleviate resistance.

== See also ==
- Energy policy of China
- Renewable energy in China
  - Solar power in China
  - Bioenergy in China
  - Geothermal power in China
  - Hydroelectricity in China
- List of offshore wind farms in China
- China High Speed Transmission
- Renewable energy
- Renewable energy commercialization
- Renewable energy by country
