= Renewable energy in China =

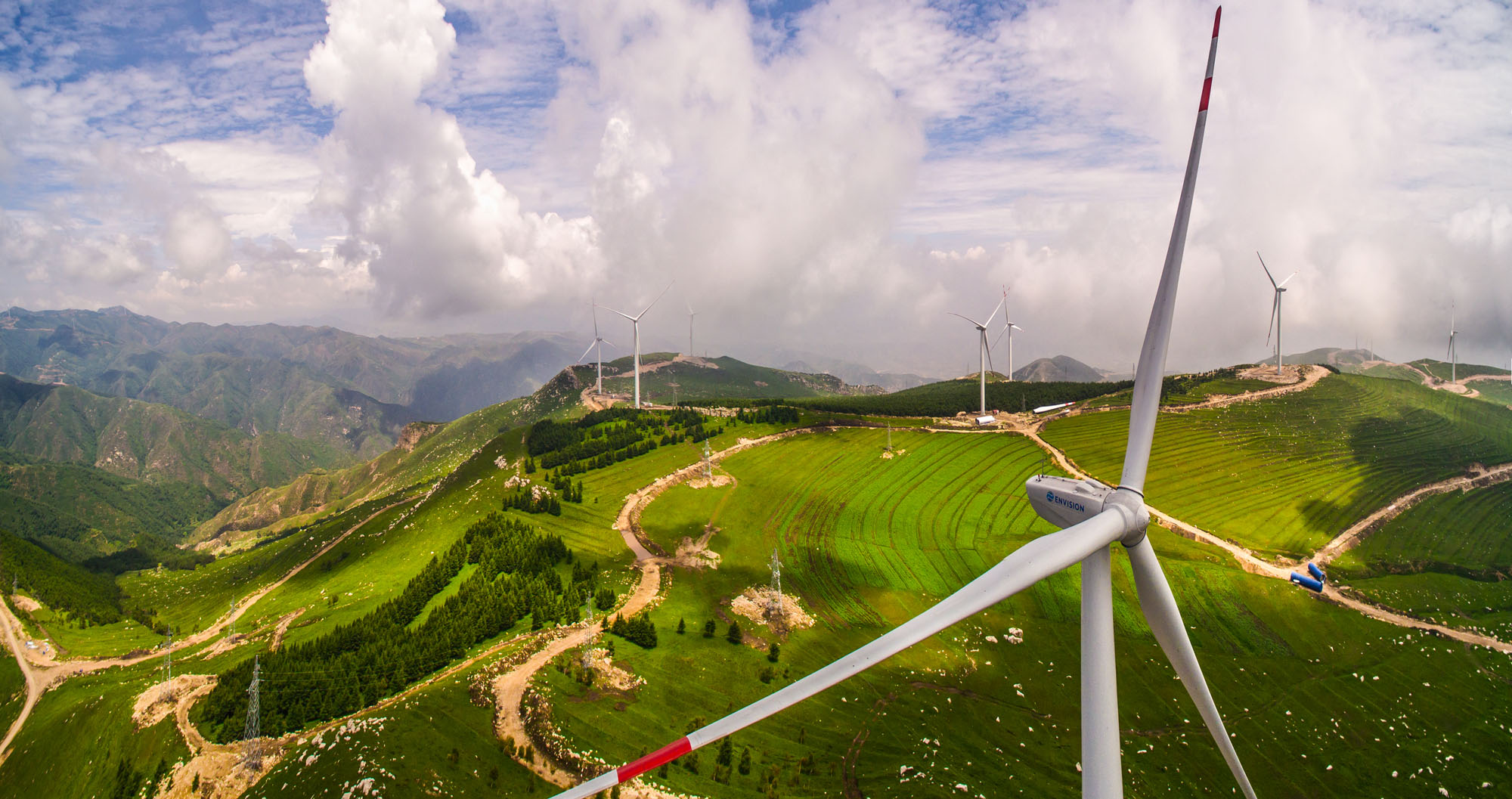
Panorama of Envision's wind farm in Shanxi, China

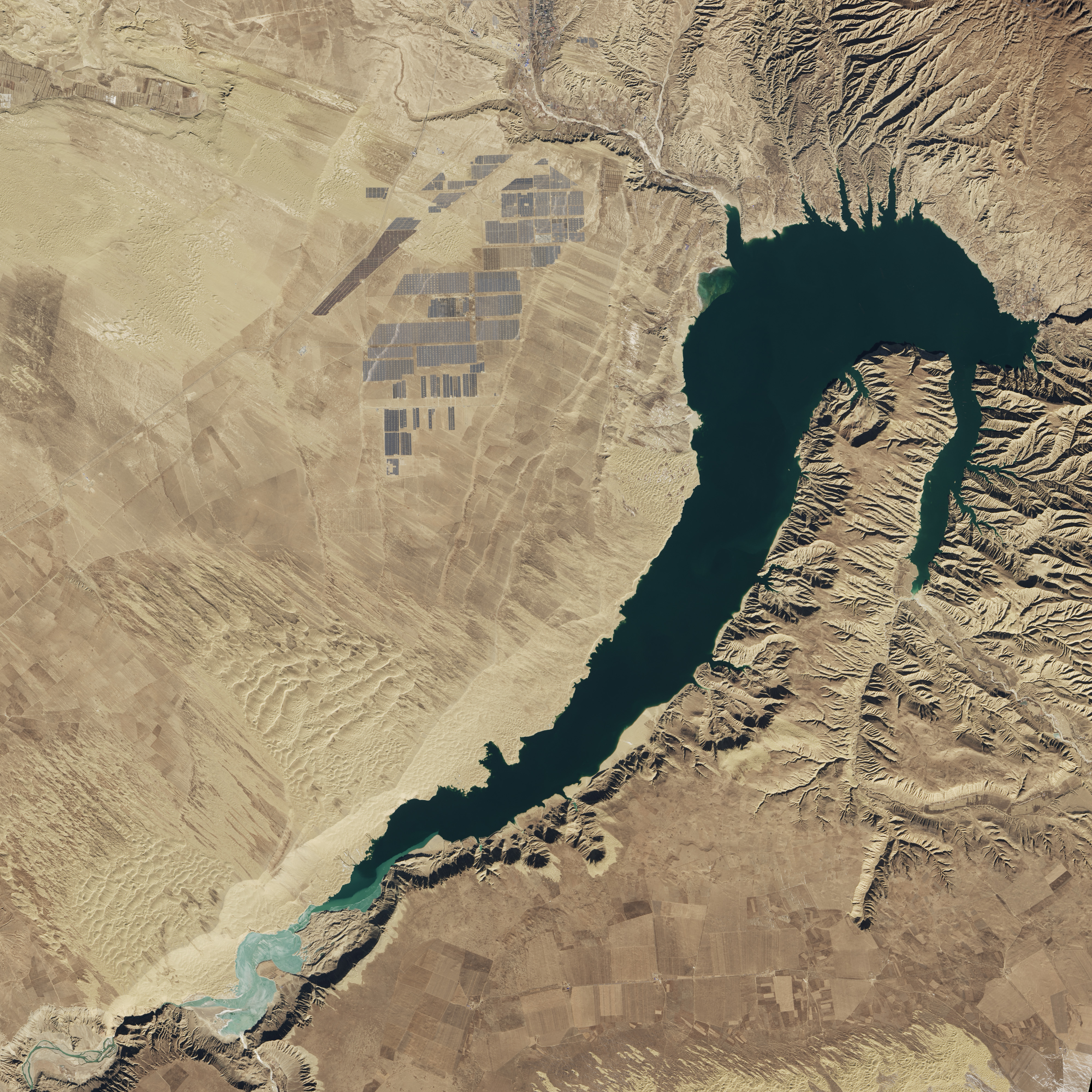
Satellite picture of the Longyangxia Dam reservoir with 1,400 MW, and solar power park with 850 MW.

China is the world's top electricity producer from renewable energy sources. China installed over 430 GW of renewables in 2025, reaching a total installed renewable capacity of over 2.34 TW by the end of the year. The country aims to achieve peak emissions by 2030 and carbon neutrality by 2060; emissions may have already peaked in 2024, six years ahead of the 2030 goal.

Although China currently has the world's largest installed capacity of hydro, solar and wind power, its energy needs are so large that fossil fuels still provide the majority of power. In 2020, as a part of the Central Committee's fourteenth five-year plan, a target of 20% total energy production from non-fossil fuel sources by 2025 was set. By the end of 2023, renewables accounted for 51.9% of China's installed power generation capacity, and renewable energy capacity is growing faster than the country's fossil fuels and nuclear power capacity. Electricity generation from renewable energy was about 35% of total electricity, while the renewable share in total energy consumption was much lower.

China sees renewables as a source of energy security and not only a means to reduce carbon emissions. Unlike oil, coal and gas, the supplies of which are finite and subject to geopolitical tensions, renewable energy systems can be built and used wherever there is sufficient water, wind, and sun. China also possesses the rare earth deposits, refining capacity, and manufacturing supply chains needed to produce renewables, namely solar and wind, domestically at scale, without risk of foreign bottlenecks.

China is also a major leader of clean energy technology. As Chinese renewable manufacturing has grown, the costs of renewable energy technologies have dropped dramatically due to both innovation and economies of scale from market expansion. From 2005 to 2014, production of solar cells in China has expanded 100-fold. In 2015, China became the world's largest producer of photovoltaic power, with 43 GW of total installed capacity. By late 2025, China's solar manufacturing capacity reached 1,200 GW per year, more than the global yearly demand.

China is the world's largest investor in renewable energy. In 2024, global investment in renewable energy totalled US$2,033 billion, with China contributing US$625 billion or 31% of that figure. In 2024, more wind turbines and solar panels were installed in China than in the rest of the world combined. China also leads the renewable energy landscape in patent filings and research publications.

== Renewable electricity overview ==
Renewable electricity generation in China by source in TWh:

- Wind
- Solar
- Hydro
- Biofuels and waste

Electricity production (GWh) in China by source, 2008–2025
Year	Total	Fossil			Nuclear	Renewable								Total renewable	% renewable
Year	Total	Coal	Oil	Gas	Nuclear	Hydro	Wind	Solar PV	Biofuels	Waste	Solar thermal	Geo- thermal	Tide	Total renewable	% renewable
2008	3,481,985	2,743,767	23,791	31,028	68,394	585,187	14,800	152	14,715	0	0	144	7	615,005	17.66%
2009	3,741,961	2,940,751	16,612	50,813	70,134	615,640	26,900	279	20,700	0	0	125	7	663,651	17.74%
2010	4,207,993	3,250,409	13,236	69,027	73,880	722,172	44,622	699	24,750	9,064	2	125	7	801,441	19.05%
2011	4,715,761	3,723,315	7,786	84,022	86,350	698,945	70,331	2,604	31,500	10,770	6	125	7	814,288	17.27%
2012	4,994,038	3,785,022	6,698	85,686	97,394	872,107	95,978	6,344	33,700	10,968	9	125	7	1,019,238	20.41%
2013	5,447,231	4,110,826	6,504	90,602	111,613	920,291	141,197	15,451	38,300	12,304	26	109	8	1,127,686	20.70%
2014	5,678,945	4,115,215	9,517	114,505	132,538	1,064,337	156,078	29,195	44,437	12,956	34	125	8	1,307,170	23.02%
2015	5,859,958	4,108,994	9,679	145,346	170,789	1,130,270	185,766	45,225	52,700	11,029	27	125	8	1,425,180	24.32%
2016	6,217,907	4,241,786	10,367	170,488	213,287	1,193,374	237,071	75,256	64,700	11,413	29	125	11	1,581,979	25.44%
2017	6,452,900				248,100	1,194,700	304,600	117,800						1,700,000	26.34%
2018	6,994,700	4,482,900	1,500	215,500	295,000	1,232,100	365,800	176,900	93,600					1,868,400	26.71%
2019	7,326,900	4,553,800	1,300	232,500	348,700	1,302,100	405,300	224,000	112,600					2,044,000	27.76%
2020	7,623,600	5,174,300 (Note: Including biomass.)			366,200	1,355,200	466,500	261,100						2,082,800 (Note: Excluding biomass.)	27.32%
2021	8,376,800	5,646,300			407,500	1,340,100	655,600	327,000						2,322,700	27.73%
2022	8,848,710	5,888,790			417,780	1,352,200	762,670	427,270						2,542,120	28.73%
2023	9,456,440	6,265,740			434,720	1,285,850	885,870	584,150						2,755,880	29.14%
2024	10,086,880	6,374,260			450,850	1,425,680	997,040	839,040						3,261,760	32.33%
2025	10,575,250	6,327,150			485,230	1,461,670	1,127,920	1,173,240						3,762,830	35.58%

2025 saw China's first 12-month decline in carbon dioxide emissions attributable to growth in renewable energy. (Carbon dioxide is a greenhouse gas known to cause global warming.) The 2016 decline is attributable to a slump after stimulus measures, and 2022's decline is attributable to zero-Covid controls.

As of year end 2025 hydroelectric power remains the largest component of renewable electricity production at 1,461 TWh. Solar power provided the next largest share with 1,173 TWh, followed by wind at 1,127 TWh. The overall share of electricity generated from renewable sources based on the figures in the above table has grown from a little over 17% in 2008 to a little over 35.5% by 2025. Solar and wind power continue to grow at a rapid pace, with solar power in particular growing 671% from a base of just 152 GWh in 2008.

By the end of 2025, the country had a total renewable energy capacity of 2,340 GW, mainly from hydroelectric, solar and wind power. By the end of 2025, China's hydropower, solar power, and wind power capacity reached 442 GW, 1,200 GW, and 640 GW respectively.

== Sources ==
=== Hydropower ===
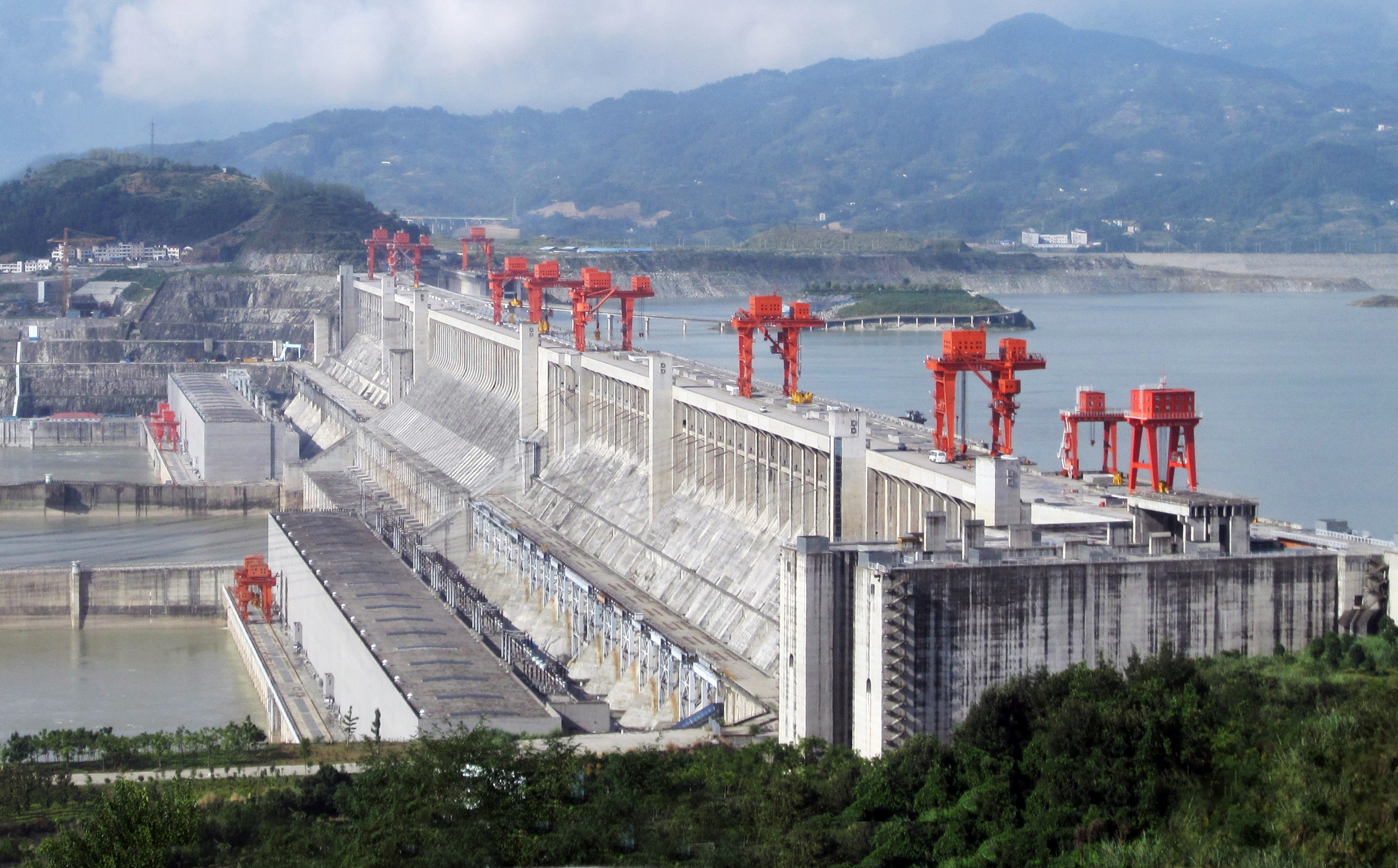
Three Gorges Dam hydroelectric power plant in Hubei, China

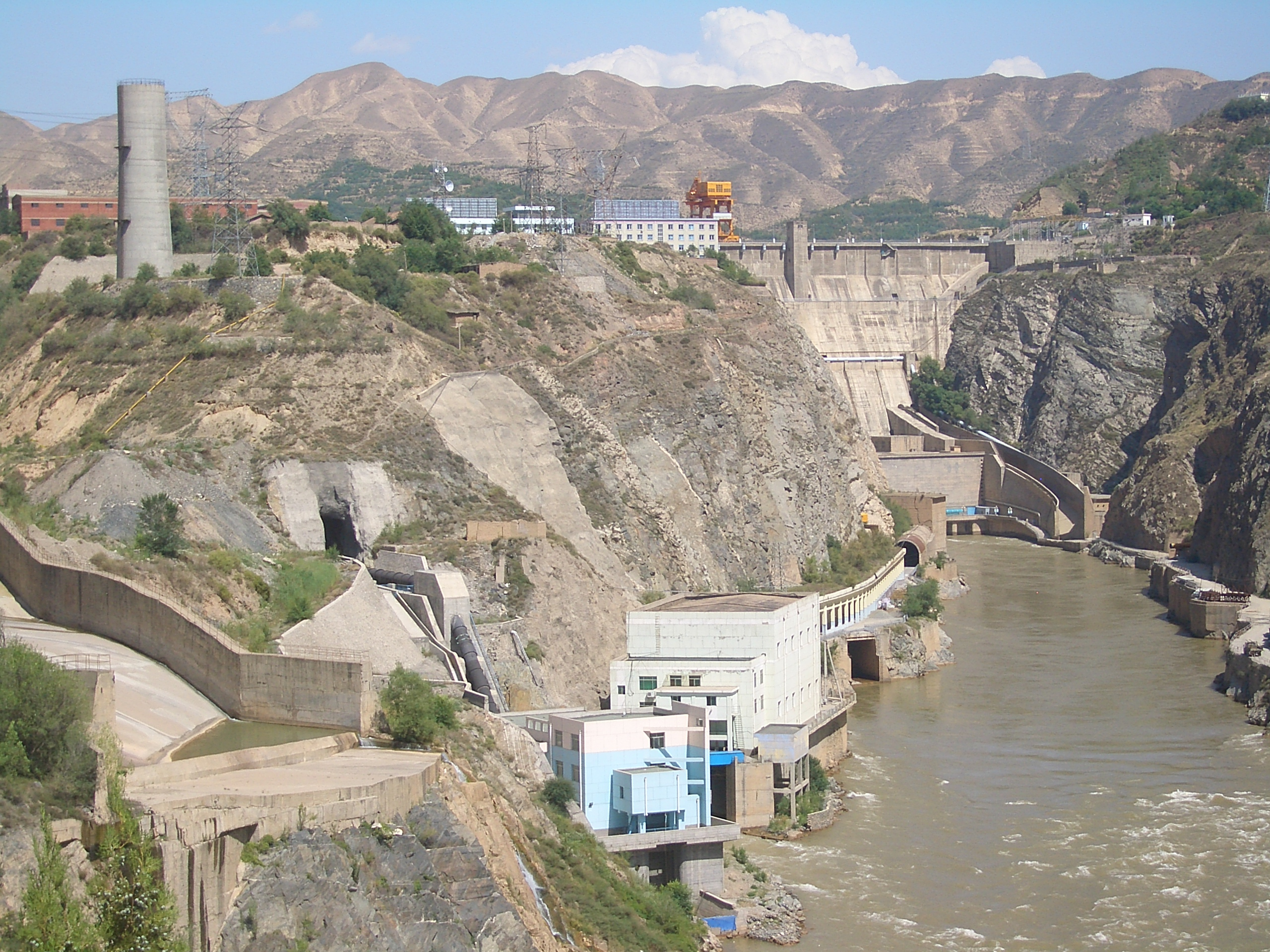
Liujiaxia Dam hydroelectric power plant in Gansu, China

As of 2020, China had more than 150 dams with generating capacity of more than 300 megawatts and installed capacity of 369 gigawatts.

As of 2021, China operates four of the world's six largest dams. These include the world's biggest (Three Gorges Dam, with 22.5 gigawatts capacity) and second biggest (Baihetan Dam).

In 2024, China's total installed hydroelectric capacity reached 426 GW.

=== Wind power ===
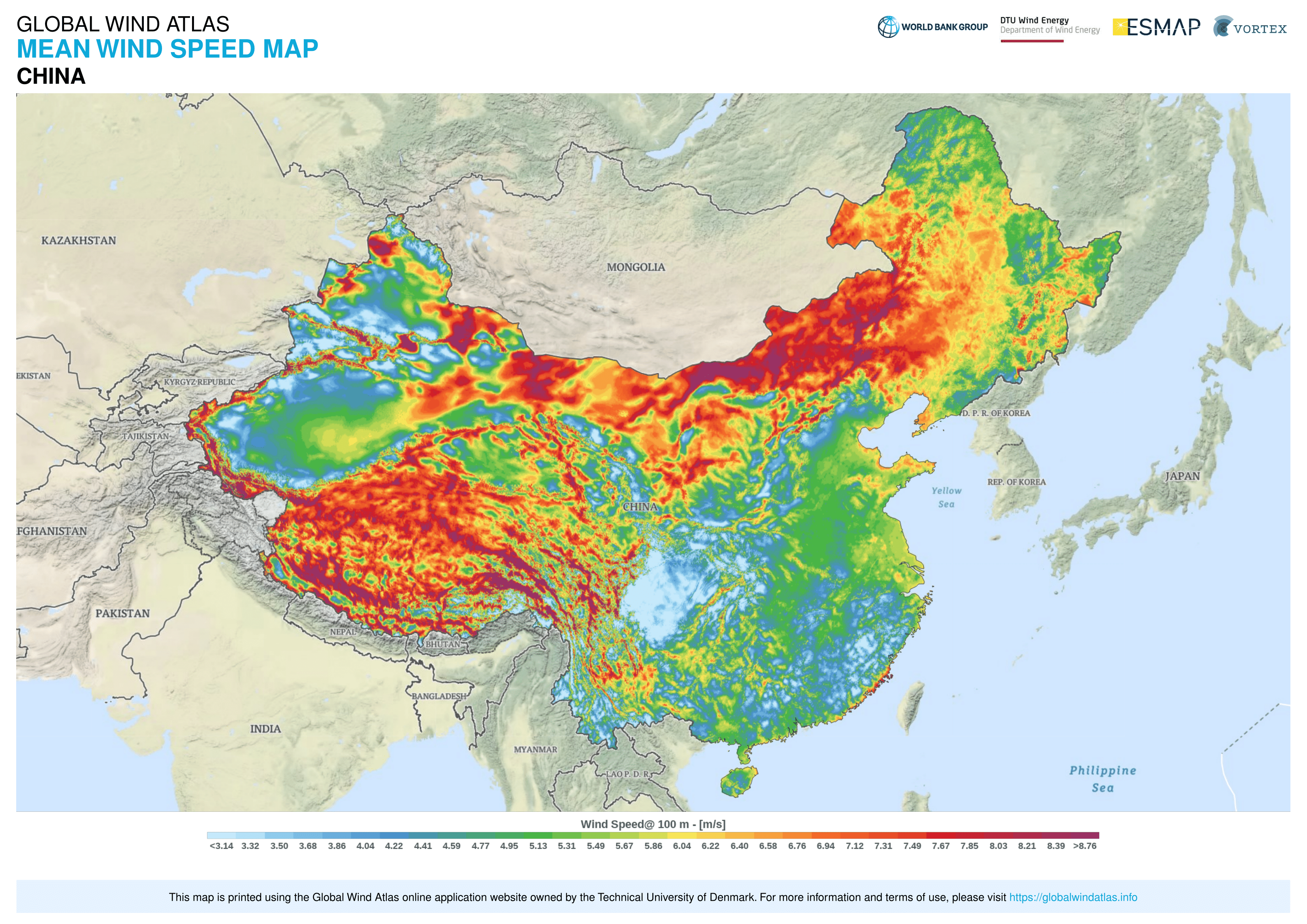
Mean Wind Speed in China.

China has the largest wind resources in the world and three-quarters of this natural resource is located at sea. Per its 13th Five-Year Plan, China aimed to have 210 GW of wind power capacity by 2020. It exceeded that goal, reaching 276 GW of onshore wind power by the end of 2020.

China encourages foreign companies, especially from the United States, to visit and invest in Chinese wind power generation. However, consumption of wind energy in China has not always kept up with the construction of wind power capacity in the country.

In 2008, China was the fourth largest producer of wind power after the United States, Germany, and Spain. At the end of 2008, wind power in China accounted for 12.2 GW of electricity generating capacity. By the end of 2008, at least fifteen Chinese companies were commercially producing wind turbines and several dozen more were producing components. Turbine sizes of 1.5 MW and 2 MW became common. Leading wind power companies were Goldwind, Dongfang, and Sinovel. China also increased the production of small-scale wind turbines to about 80,000 turbines (80 MW) in 2008. Through all these developments, the Chinese wind industry appeared unaffected by the Great Recession, according to industry observers.

By 2009 China had total installed windpower capacity up to 26 GW. China has identified wind power as a key growth component of the country's economy.

As of 2010, China has become the world's largest maker of wind turbines, surpassing Denmark, Germany, Spain, and the United States. The initial future target set by the Chinese government was 10 GW by 2010, but the total installed capacity for wind power generation in China had already reached 25.1 GW by the end of 2009.

In September 2019, Norwegian energy firm Equinor and state-owned China Power International Holding (CPIH) announced their plan to cooperate in developing offshore wind in China and Europe.

In 2020, China deployed 71.7 GW of wind energy capacity, a 60% increase compared to 2019 and more than the rest of the world combined.

In the year 2022, China is set to install more 56 GW of wind turbines, of which 50 GW are from onshore wind and 6 GW from offshore wind turbines.

As of at least 2024, China has the largest domestic market for wind turbines.

Although in some countries there are aesthetic objections to large-scale wind farms, in China they are often perceived as an aesthetic positive due to their associations with modernity and green development.

=== Solar power ===
PV capacity growth in China

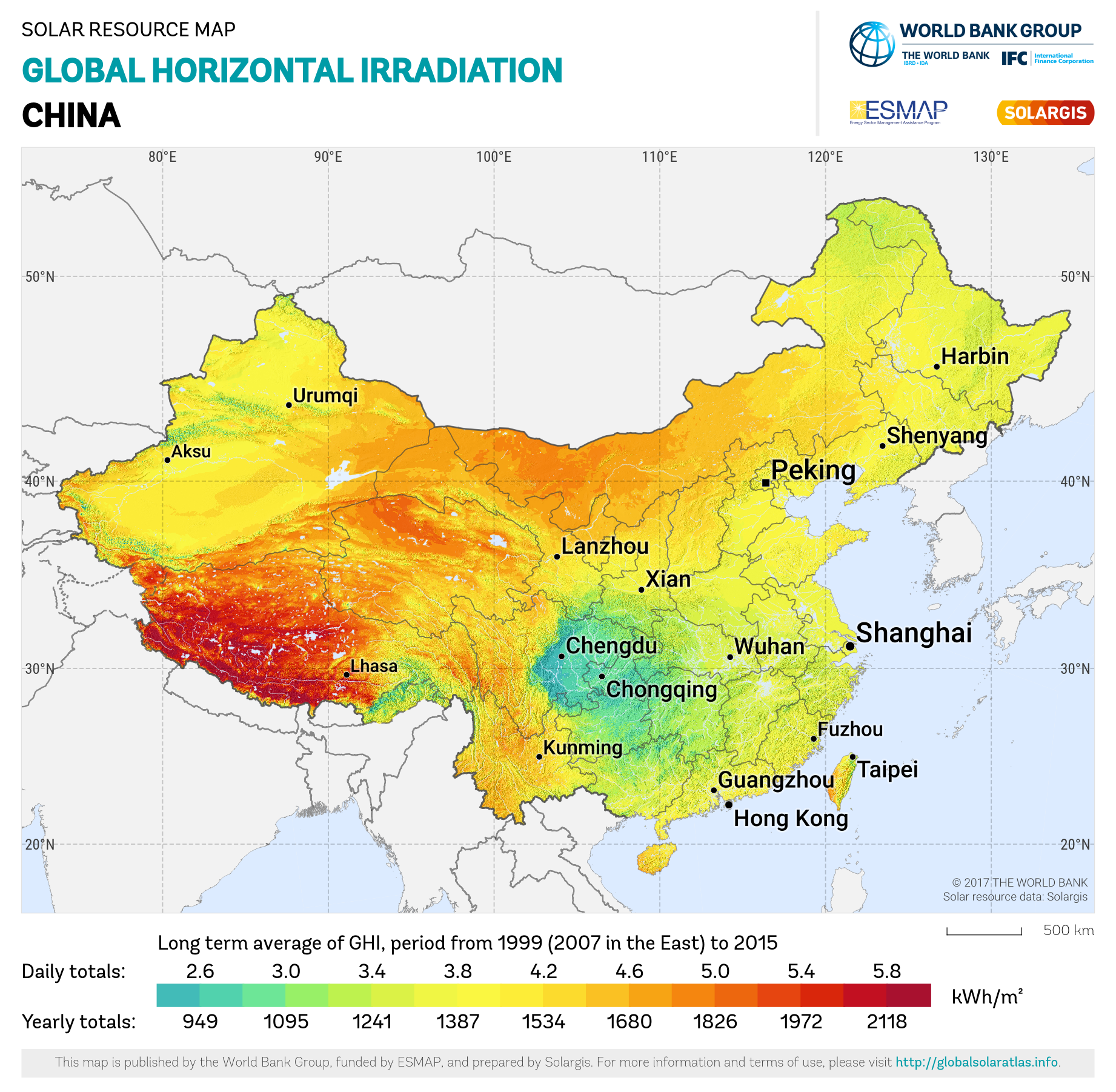
Global Horizontal Irradiation in China.

China produces 63% of the world's solar photovoltaics (PV). It is the world's largest solar panel manufacturer as of at least 2024. It also has the world's largest domestic market for solar panels.

Following the new incentive scheme of Golden Sun announced by the government in 2009, there are numerous recent developments and plans announced by industry players that became part of the milestones for solar industry and technology development in China, such as the new thin film solar plant developed by Anwell Technologies in the Henan province using its own proprietary solar technology. The agreement was signed by LDK for a 500 MW solar project in the desert, alongside First Solar and Ordos City. The effort to drive the renewable energy use in China was further assured after the speech of General Secretary of the Chinese Communist Party Hu Jintao given at the UN climate summit on 22 September 2009 in New York, pledging that China would adopt plans to use 15% of its energy from renewable sources within a decade.

China has become a world leader in the manufacture of solar photovoltaic technology, with its six biggest solar companies having a combined value of over $15 billion. Around 820 MW of solar PV were produced in China in 2007, second only to Japan.

Following a report from China Renewable Energy Engineering Institute, in 2022 China is set to install more 100 GW of solar panels.

China's solar exports in 2022 grew by 64% to US$52 billion. Chinese exports mainly consist of solar modules, with Europe being the destination for 56% of the share of exports in 2022.

As of at least 2023, solar power in China is cheaper than coal-fired power.

Although in some countries there are aesthetic objections to large-scale solar farms, in China they are often perceived as an aesthetic positive due to their associations with modernity and green development.

=== Biomass and biofuel ===
China emerged as the world's third largest producer of ethanol-based bio-fuels (after the U.S and Brazil) at the end of the 10th Five Year Plan Period in 2005 and at present ethanol accounts for 20% of total automotive fuel consumption in China. In the 11th Five Year Plan period (2006 through 2010) China planned to develop six megatons/year of fuel ethanol capacity, which is expected to grow to 15 megatons/year by 2020. Despite this level of production, experts say that there will be no threat to food security, though there will be an increasing number of farmers who will be "farming oil" if the price of crude oil continues to increase. Based on planned ethanol projects in some provinces in China, the output of corn would be insufficient to provide the raw material for plants in these provinces. In the recently published World Economic Outlook, the International Monetary Fund expressed concern that there would be increasing competition worldwide between bio-fuels and food consumption for agricultural products and that that competition would likely continue to result in increases in the price of crops.

Work has begun on the ¥250 million Kaiyou Green Energy Biomass (Rice Husks) Power Generating project located in the Suqian City Economic Development Zone in Jiangsu. The Kaiyou Green Energy Biomass Power project will generate 144 GWh/year (equivalent to 16.5 MW) and use 200 kilotonnes/year of crop waste as inputs.

Bioenergy is also used at the domestic level in China, both in biomass stoves and by producing biogas from animal manure. As of at least 2023, China is both the world's largest producer and largest consumer of household biogas, with more than 30 million rural households using biogas digesters.

=== Geothermal ===
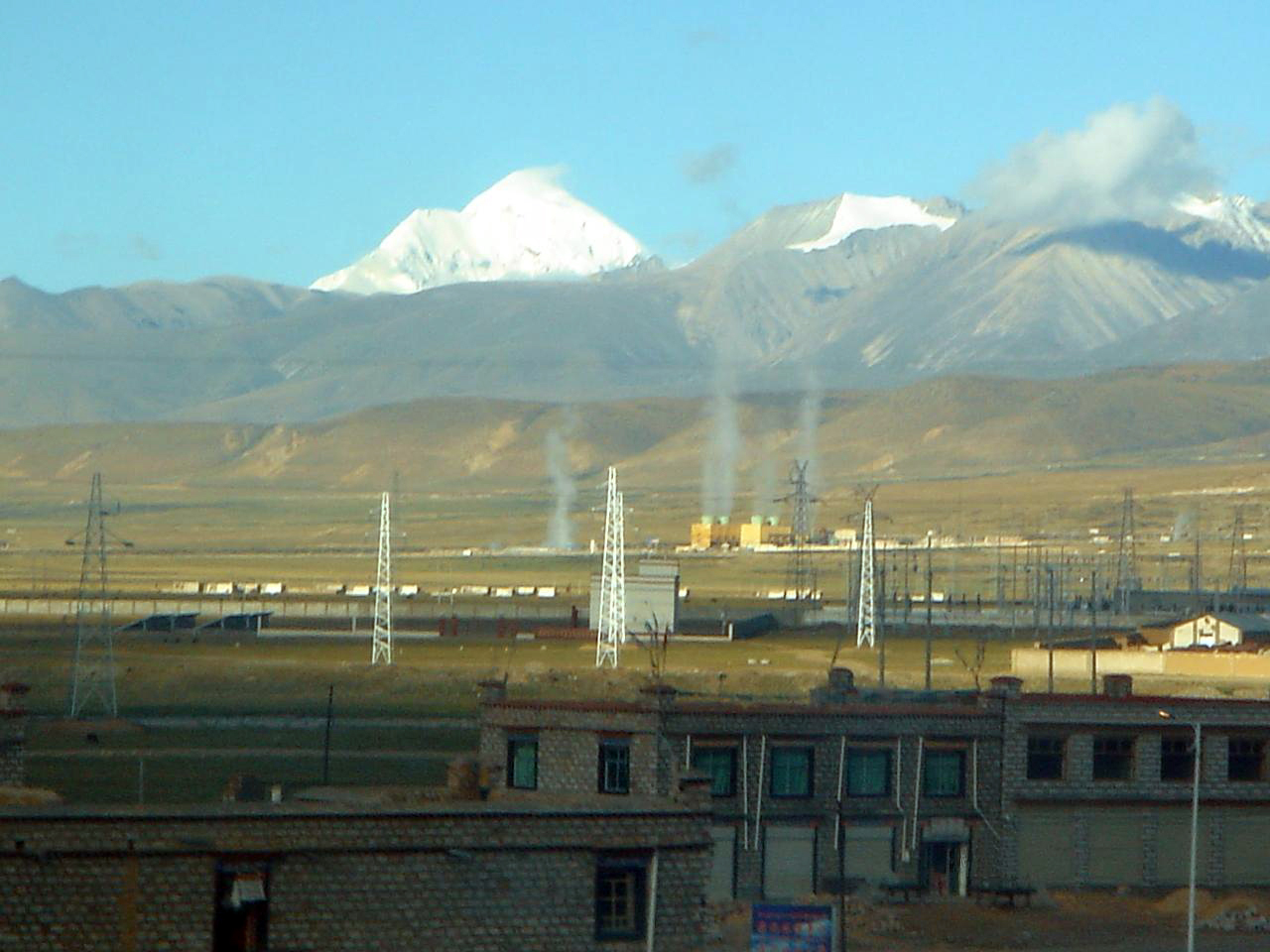
A 24 MW power station in Yangbajain Geothermal Field

Geothermal resources in China are abundant and widely distributed throughout the country. There are over 2,700 hot springs occurring at the surface, with temperatures exceeding 250 °C. In 1990, the total flow rate of thermal water for direct uses amounted to over 9,500 kg/s, making China the second direct user of geothermal energy in the world. Recognizing geothermal energy as an alternative and renewable energy resource since the 1970s, China has conducted extensive explorations aiming at identifying high temperature resources for electric generation. Until 2006, 181 geothermal systems had been found on mainland China, with an estimated generation potential of 1,740 MW. However, only seven plants, with a total capacity of 32 MW, had been constructed and were operating in 2006.

== National laws and policies ==
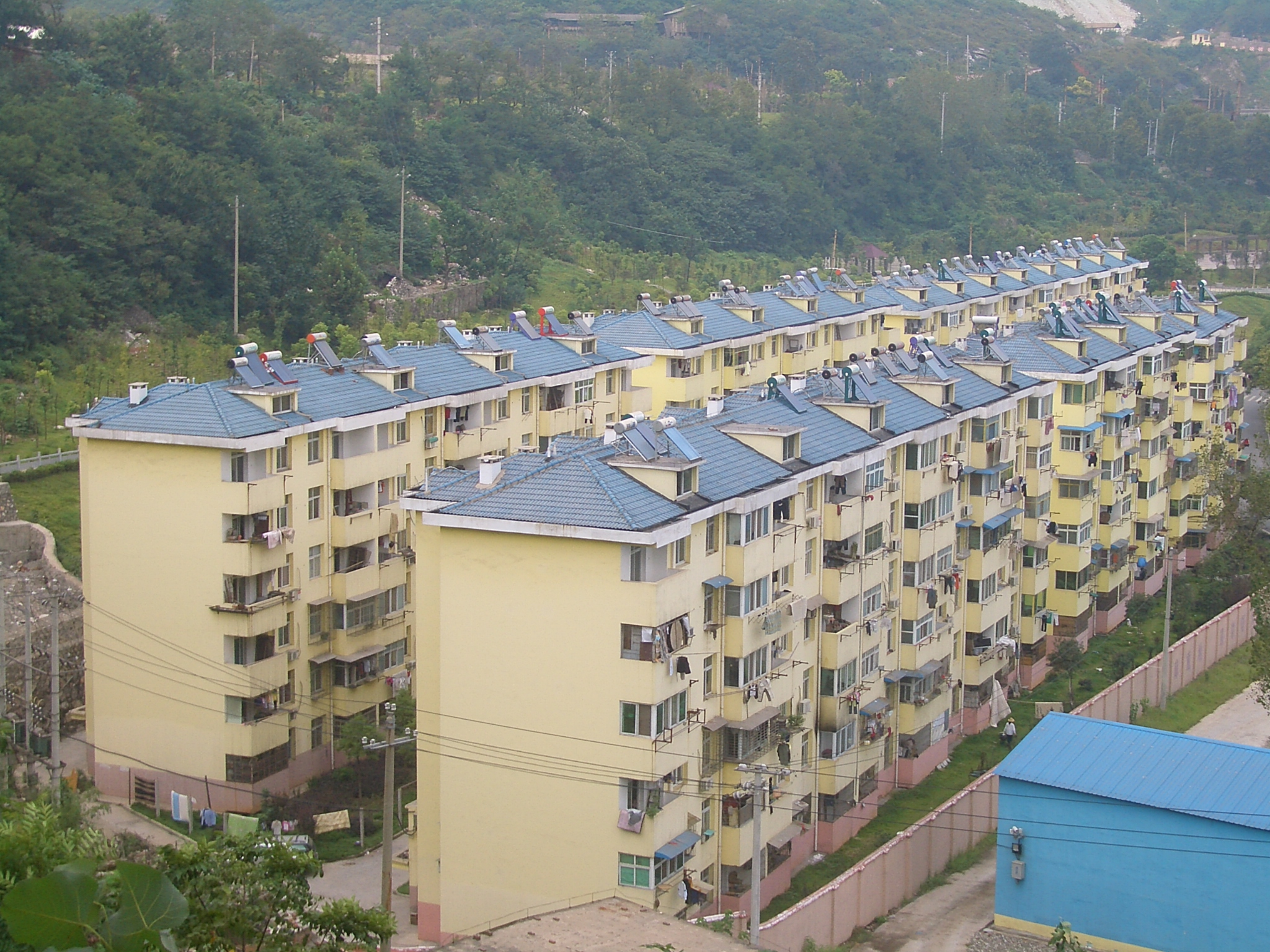
Solar power water heaters are very popular among middle sized cities in China.

Chinese policies explicitly promote the use of clean energy as well as increasing the use of domestically manufactured technology. In the clean energy sector, China is a leading source of technology transfer to other developing countries. Since 2010 it has often led the European Union and the United States in clean energy investments. As of at least 2024, it is the world's leading energy financier.

=== Government bodies ===
After the dissolution of the Energy and Industry Department in 1993, China has been running without a government agency effectively managing the country's energy. Related issues are supervised by multiple organisations such as the National Development and Reform Commission (NDRC), Ministry of Commerce, State electricity Regulatory Commission (SERC) and so forth. In 2008, the National Energy Administration was founded under the NDRC, however its work has been proven inefficient. In January 2010, the State Council decided to set up a National Energy Commission (NEC), headed by then-Premier Wen Jiabao. The commission will be responsible for drafting a national energy development plan, reviewing energy security and major energy issues and coordinating domestic energy development and international cooperation.

=== Policy history ===
China's Sixth Five-Year Plan (1981–1985) was the first to address government policy support for solar PV panel manufacturing. Policy support for solar panel manufacturing has been a part of every Five-Year Plan since.

The Renewable Energy Law passed in 2005 explicitly states in its first chapter that the development and the usage of renewable energy is a prioritised area in energy development. The law established China's framework for regulating renewable energy. It also created four mechanisms designed to promote the development of China's renewable energy: (1) a national renewable energy target, (2) a mandatory connection and purchase policy, (3) a feed-in tariff system, and (4) a cost-sharing mechanism which includes a fund for renewable energy development. Implementing the renewable energy law expanded the market for renewable technology.

Contemporaneous with the Renewable Energy Law, China issued its Eleventh Five Year Plan. It sought to move China away from energy-intensive manufacturing and into high-value sectors. Every subsequent plan has done the same and, like the Eleventh, they have also highlighted the importance of low-carbon technology as a strategic emerging industry, particularly in the areas of wind and solar power. Likewise, the Twelfth Five-Year Plan also placed great emphasis on green energy. Detailed incentive policies and programs included the Golden Sun program, which provides financial subsidies, technology support and market incentives to facilitate the development of the solar power industry; the Suggestions on Promoting Wind Electricity Industry in 2006, which offers preferential policies for wind power development; and many other policies. Besides promoting policies, China has enacted a number of policies to standardise renewable energy products, to prevent environmental damage, and to regulate the price of green energy. These policies include, but are not limited to Renewable Energy Law, the Safety Regulations of Hydropower Dams, and the National Standard of Solar Water Heaters.

Several provisions in relevant Chinese laws and regulations address the development of methane gas in rural China. These provisions include Article 54 of the Agriculture Law of the People's Republic of China, Articles 4 and 11 of the Energy Conservation Law of the People's Republic of China, Article 18 of the Renewable Energy Law of the People's Republic of China and Article 12 of the Regulations of the People's Republic of China Concerning Restoring Farmland to Forest.

On 20 April 2007, the Environment and Resources Committee of the National People's Congress and the National Development and Reform Commission convened a conference on the occasion of the first anniversary of the Renewable Energy Law.

The Great Recession prompted significant stimulus efforts by China to invigorate its then-struggling solar industry.

In 2009, China amended the Renewable Energy Law to improve the process through which renewable energy is connected to the power grid and distributed. These amendments also sought to address interprovincial equity in bearing to costs associated with developing renewable energy.

Approximately 54% of the Belt and Road Initiative's energy projects are in clean energy or alternative energy sectors.

General Secretary of the Chinese Communist Party Xi Jinping has said China will reduce its CO_{2} releases per unit of gross domestic product by 65 percent from 2005 and hit peak CO_{2} levels by 2030. The country will hit carbon neutrality by 2060. That requires renewable energy consumption to rise to 25 percent and a corresponding increase in battery storage.

== Clean Development Mechanism projects in China ==
The Clean Development Mechanism emerged from the Kyoto Protocol as means for countries with Kyoto targets to purchase carbon credits resulting from costly emissions reductions in developing counties. China became the largest source of credits (i.e., Certified Emissions Reductions or CERs).

According to the UNFCCC database, by November 2011, China was the leading host nation for CDM projects with 1661 projects (46.32%) of a total of 3586 registered project activities (100%). According to the IGES (Japan), the running total of CERs generated by CDM projects in China at 31 March 2011 was topped by HFC reduction/avoidance projects (365,577 \times; 1000t/CO_{2}-e) followed by hydro power (227,693), wind power (149,492), N_{2}O decomposition (102,798), and methane recovery (102,067).

According to the United Nations Framework Convention on Climate Change, of a total of more than 600 registered CDM Projects worldwide through mid-April 2007, there are now 70 registered CDM projects in China. The pace of Chinese CDM project registration is accelerating; prior to the beginning of 2007 China had 34 registered CDM projects, yet to date in 2007 another 36 Chinese CDM projects have been registered.

The Shanghai Power Transmission and Distribution Joint Stock Company, a subsidiary of the Shanghai Electric and Gas Group Joint Stock Company entered into a joint venture agreement with Canada's Xantrex Technology, Inc, to build a factory to design, manufacture and sell solar and wind power electric and gas electronics products. The new company is in the final stages of the approval process.

According to Theo Ramborst, the general manager and CEO of Bosch Rexroth (China) Ltd., a subsidiary of the Bosch Group AG, a world leader in controls, transmission and machine hydraulics manufacturing, Bosch Rexroth (China) Ltd. contracted €120 million in wind turbo generator business in China in 2006, a 66% increase year-on-year. Responding to the increase in wind energy business in China, Bosch Rexroth (China) Ltd. invested ¥280 million in October 2006 in plant expansions in Beijing and Changzhou, Jiangsu Province. Earlier in 2006 Bosch Rexroth started up its Shanghai Jinqiao (Golden Bridge) factory, which is involved in the manufacture, installation, distribution and service of transmission and control parts and systems; the Shanghai facility will also serve as Bosch's principal center for technology, personnel and distribution in China.

== Environmental protection and energy conservation ==
According to China's "Energy Blue Paper" recently written by the Chinese Academy of Social Sciences, the average rate of recovery of coal from mining in China is only 30%, less than one-half the rate of recovery throughout the world; the rate of recovery of coal resources in the US, Australia, Germany and Canada is ~80%. The rate of recovery of coal from mining in Shanxi, China's largest source of coal is approximately 40%, though the rate of recovery of village and township coal mines in Shanxi Province is only 10%–20%. Cumulatively over the course of the past 20 years (1980–2000) China has wasted upwards of 28 gigatons of coal. The same causes for a low rate of recovery in coal mining – that extraction methods are backward – lead to safety problems in China's coal mining sector. Another reason for the low rate of recovery is that the majority of extraction comes from small-scale mining; of the 346.9 gigatons of coal extracted by China, only 98 gigatons has come from large or mid-sized mines while 250 gigatons are extracted from small mines. Based on coal production in 2005 of 2.19 gigatons and a current rate of recovery of 30%, if China were able to double its rate of recovery it would save approximately 3.5 gigatons of coal.

On 13 April 2007, the Department of Science, Technology and Education of the Chinese Ministry of Agriculture hosted the Asian regional workshop on adaptation to climate change organised by the United Nations Framework Convention on Climate Change (UNFCCC). Climate change will affect Asian countries in different but consistently negative ways. Temperate regions will experience changes in boreal forest cover, while vanishing mountain glaciers will cause problems such as water shortages and increased risks of glacial lake flooding. Coastal zones are under increasing risk from sea level rises as well as pollution and overexploitation of natural resources. In 2006 in China storms, floods, heat and drought killed more than 2,700 people; effects ranged from drought in the southwest of China, which were the worst since records began to be kept in the late nineteenth century, to floods and typhoons in central and southeastern China. The weather events in China in 2006 were seen to be a prelude to weather patterns likely to become more common due to global warming. Topics discussed by representatives of Asian countries and developed countries, international organisations and nongovernmental organisations, included vulnerability assessments, implementing adaptation actions in various sectors of the economy and in specific geographical areas, such as coastal and mountainous regions.

Based on a recently completed survey in 2007, the Standardization Administration of China plans to further develop and improve standards for conservation and comprehensive use of natural resources in the following areas: energy, water, wood and land conservation, development of renewable energy, the comprehensive utilisation of mineral resources, recovery, recycling and reuse of scrap materials and clean production.

The IEA projected that China would contribute nearly 60% of global renewable energy capacity by 2030, with solar power driving 80% of the growth. Wind energy, particularly offshore, was also expected to expand significantly. While the global target to triple renewable capacity by 2030 was anticipated to be narrowly missed, renewable growth was still forecasted to surpass national goals.

== Energy production and consumption ==

In 2020, 84.33% of Chinese primary energy consumption relied on fossil fuels, and 56.56% of it relied on coal, down from 70% in 2011. These energy production processes generated approximately 9.9 billion tonnes of CO_{2}, up from 8.1 billion tonnes in 2010 and accounting for 30.9% of global emissions.

In 2021, China produced 7.727% of its energy from hydroelectric, 2.32% from nuclear, and 7.141% from other renewable energy sources, from 2.25%, 8.468%, 5.77%, relatively, in 2020. By 2023, the total non-fossil electricity installed capacity was over 50% of the total capacity installed in the country.

Chinese energy experts estimate that by 2050 the share of electricity from coal will decline to 30%–50%, and that the remaining 50%–70% will come from a combination of oil, natural gas, and renewable energy sources, including hydropower, nuclear power, biomass, solar energy, wind energy, and other renewable energy sources.

In 2018, transportation's share of energy consumption in China was 10.0%, consuming 436.2 million tons carbon equivalent, up by 7.6% in 2009 and 58.6 Mtce in 1995. The growth rate of the percentage, meanwhile, have seen a steady decline from 2010 to 2018, down from 10.8% to 3.5%.

According to a study by the Energy Research Institute of the National Development and Reform Commission on the economic circumstances of China's crude oil and chemical industry as of 2007, China has wasted an average of 400 million tons carbon equivalents annually. In 2020, China consumed 4.98 gigatons coal equivalents, up from 2.46 in 2006. According to Dai Yande, the chairman of the Energy Research Institute of the NDRC, while continued high consumption of energy is unavoidable, China must take steps to change the form of its economic growth and increase substantially the energy efficiency of industry and society. Among other things, China should find new points of economic development that move it away from being the "World's Factory" and improves energy efficiency. It also must avoid unnecessary waste, foster a sustainable economy and encourage renewable energy to reduce its reliance on petrochemical energy resources.

Since June 2006 when Chinese Premier Wen Jiabao visited the Shenhua Group's coal liquefaction project and expressed that coal-to-liquids production was one important part of China's energy security, there have been many new 'coal to oil' projects announced by many large coal producing provinces and cities. As of the end of 2006, 88 methyl alcohol projects were planned; their total was 48.5 megatons/year. By 2019, methyl alcohol output reached 69.9 megatons/year. This rapid development to build coal to oil projects prompted concerns about wasteful development and unintended consequences; these include wasteful extraction of coal, excessive water use (this process requires 10 tons of water for every ton of oil produced), and likely increases in coal prices.

China and Russia are linking their electric power networks so that China can buy power from the Russian Far East to supply Northeast China (Dongbei) and thus conserving domestic resources, lowering energy consumption, lessening China's dependence on imported oil (80%–90% of which must be shipped through unsafe waters), and reducing pollution discharge. Multiple long-distance high-tension, high-capacity line for international transmission have been built, including a 110kV transmission project, and three others with 220kV, 220kV, and 550kV. China also is considering connecting its power transmission lines with Mongolia and several former Soviet states that border China. Until 2020, Russia exported a total of 30.42 TWh electricity to China, decreasing coal consumption in the latter by 10.17 million tons. By importing electricity China not only reduced its dependence on imported crude oil, but also enhanced energy security by diversifying its foreign energy sources, making China less vulnerable to disruptions in supply.

In 2021 a total of 8571.4 TWh of electricity was generated in China, up from 7814.3 in 2020, from an installed base of 2380 GW of power generating capacity, 12.6% among which from windpower sources and 12.2% from solar sources.

== Challenges ==
There are significant logistical challenges to renewable energy in China. One such issue is grid connections from renewable energy power sources to the electricity grid. In recent years renewable energy developers have rushed to rapidly build wind farms, solar panels, and other power plants, which hasn't been synchronised with the time-consuming procurement of land permits to build grid connection. It takes more than twice as long to obtain the necessary permits and approval for the construction of high-voltage transmission lines and other grid connections as it does to obtain the permits and begin construction of power plants, creating a significant time lag.

Furthermore, even when connections have been built sometimes the grid still cannot absorb all of the electricity produced because the connections have voltage limits below what is being produced by many of China's renewable energy power plants, a phenomenon called curtailment. This issue of grid connection is especially true in regard to long-distance transmission of electricity. Most of China's wind and solar energy sources, and thus its renewable energy power plants, are located in the northwest of the country, while the highest electricity demand is in the southeast. However, there are limited high capacity transmission lines capable of transmitting the necessary amounts of electricity across that distance, leading to curtailments in the northwest and a need for fossil fuels in the southeast. The development of more long-distance, high-voltage transmission lines is necessary to maximising the use of the renewable energy that is being produced. Broader infrastructure initiatives like this can ensure the efficacy of renewable energy policy in China.

== See also ==
- List of power stations in China
- Automotive industry in China
- Climate change in China
- Electric vehicle industry in China
- Pollution in China
- Renewable energy in Asia
- World energy supply and consumption
- Renewable energy commercialization
- Sustainable energy
- Renewable energy by country
