= Donghai Bridge Wind Farm =

Chinese offshore wind farm

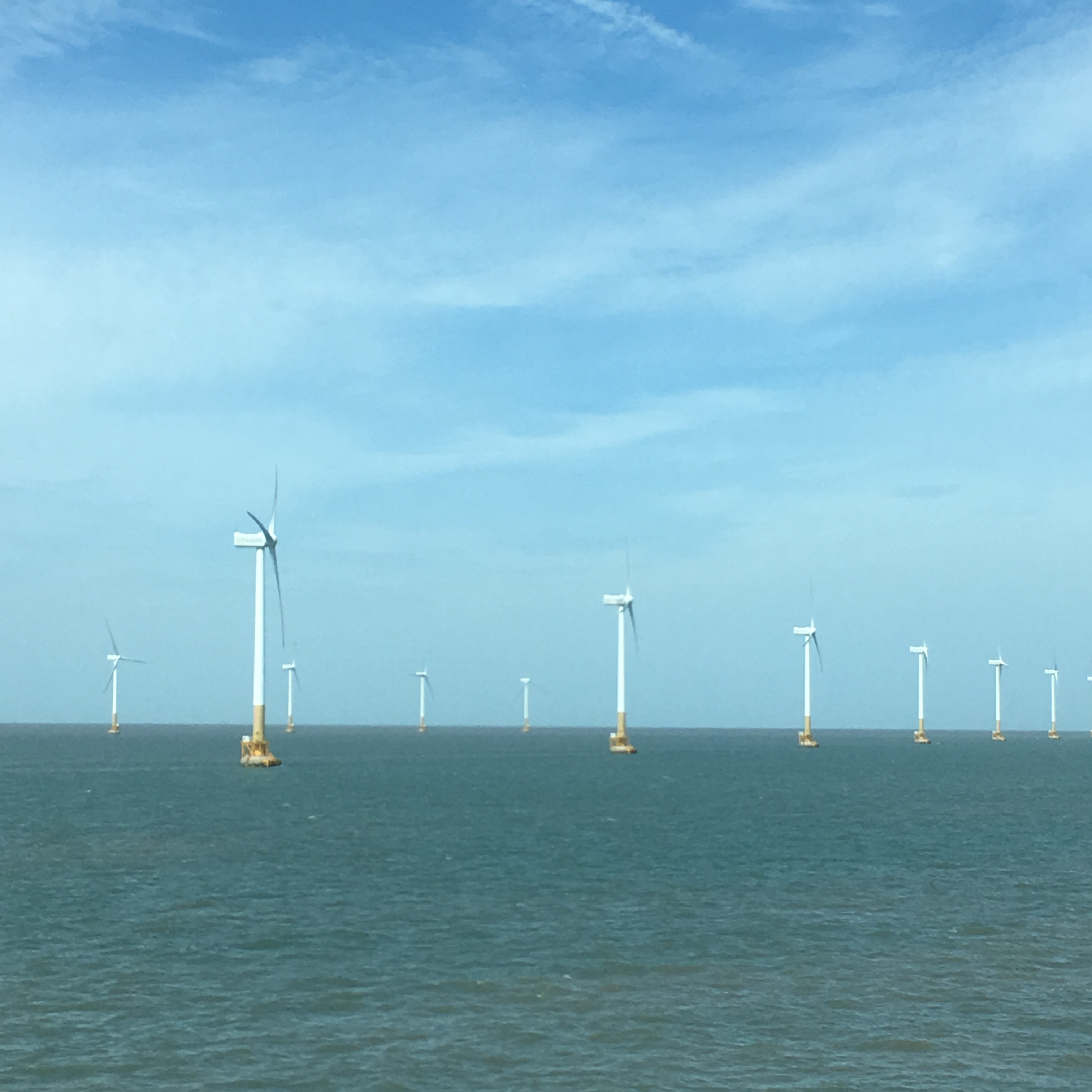
- Country: People's Republic of China
- Location: next to Donghai Bridge, Shanghai, East China Sea
- Coordinates: 30.770°N 121.994°E
- Status: Operational
- Construction began: July 2008
- Commission date: July 6, 2010
- Owner: Shanghai Electric Group

Wind farm
- Type: Nearshore
- Max. water depth: 7 m (23 ft)
- Distance from shore: 9 km (6 mi)
- Hub height: 91 m (299 ft)
- Rotor diameter: 90 m (295 ft)
- Site area: 14 km^{2} (5 sq mi)

Power generation
- Units operational: 34 × 3 MW
- Make and model: Sinovel: SL3000/90
- Nameplate capacity: 102 MW

External links
- Commons: Related media on Commons

The Donghai Bridge Wind Farm is a 102 MW offshore wind farm close to the Donghai Bridge, Shanghai and is capable of powering 200,000 households. It started producing and transmitting power to the mainland grid on July 6, 2010. It is the first commercial offshore wind farm in China.

== See also ==
- Wind power in China
- List of wind farms in China
