= Guishan Offshore Windfarm =

Chinese offshore wind farm

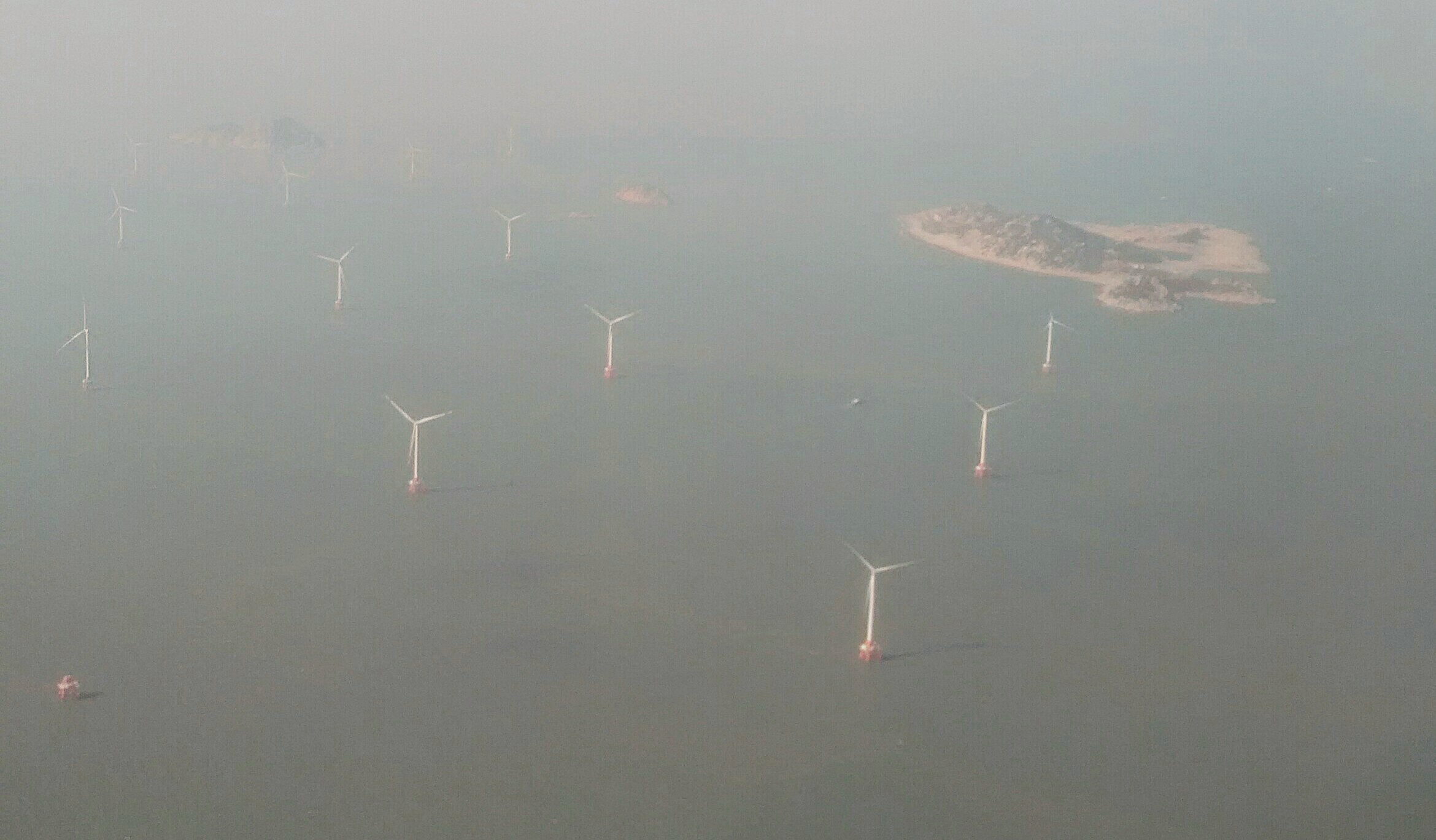
- Country: China
- Location: South China Sea, Zhuhai, Guangdong
- Status: Operational
- Construction began: September 2016
- Owner: Southern Offshore Wind Power Joint Development

Wind farm
- Type: Offshore
- Site area: 32.6 km^{2} (13 sq mi)

Power generation
- Units operational: 34 × 3 MW (Phase 1); 15 × 5.5 MW (Phase 2)
- Nameplate capacity: 198 MW

External links
- Commons: Related media on Commons

The Guishan Offshore Windfarm is a 198MW offshore wind farm near Zhuhai in Guangdong province, China.

== Construction ==
Construction of the Guishan Offshore Windfarm began in September 2016 by the facility's owner, Southern Offshore Wind Power Joint Development shortly after the approval of the project by the Guangdong Development & Reform Commission. By March 2018, the wind farm is already 75 percent complete and the facility already began generating electricity on March 13, 2018.

== Facilities ==
The wind farm phase 1 project consists of 34 wind turbines each with a capacity of 3 MW each. Its phase 2 project consists of 15 wind turbines each with a capacity of 5.5 MW each.

== See also ==
- Wind power in China
- List of wind farms in China
