= Sinovel =

Sinovel Wind (Group) Co., Ltd.
- Native name: 华锐风电科技(集团)股份有限公司
- Type: Limited company
- Traded as: SSE: 601558
- Industry: Wind power
- Founded: 2005 (Beijing)
- Founder: Han Junliang
- Headquarters: Beijing, People's Republic of China
- Products: Wind turbines
- Parent: Dalian Huarui Heavy Industry Group
- Website: www.sinovel.com

Sinovel Wind Group Company (Chinese: 华锐风电) is a Chinese state-owned wind turbine manufacturer headquartered in Beijing.

Sinovel is affiliated with a Chinese state-owned company, Dalian Heavy Mechanical & Electrical Equipment Engineering. It was founded in 2005 by Han Junliang.

== History ==
Sinovel was founded by Han Junliang who later became the first wind power billionaire after the IPO of the company in 2011. Initially capital of 100 million yuan was provided by a Chinese state-owned company, Dalian Heavy Mechanical & Electrical Equipment Engineering.

Donghai Bridge Wind Farm, the first offshore wind farm in China, began operation in July 2010 using 34 3 MW Sinovel turbines.

In December 2010, the Massachusetts Water Resources Authority ordered a 1.5 MW wind turbine to power a wastewater pumping station in Charlestown, Boston.

In 2011, Sinovel was listed on the Shanghai Stock Exchange and raised $1.4 billion.

In 2014, its chairman, Wang Yuan resigned from its post.

== Subsidiary ==
- Dalian Guotong Electronics

== Controversies ==
The firm was accused of stealing software from AMSC and was sued by the company. On 27 June 2013, the United States Department of Justice charged Sinovel and three individuals with theft of trade secrets. On 24 January 2018 a U.S. federal jury in Madison, Wisconsin found Sinovel guilty of stealing trade secrets from AMSC causing the American company to lose over US$800 million. The jury found that Sinovel stole trade secrets and copyrighted information with the intention of building its own versions of AMSC systems and retrofit previously built wind turbines so it could avoid having to pay AMSC for its technology. According to a press release by AMSC on 3 July 2018, AMSC has settled the lawsuit with Sinovel.

== See also ==
- List of wind turbine manufacturers
- Wind energy companies of China
