= Longyuan Rudong Intertidal Wind Farm =

Chinese offshore wind farm

- Official name: 龙源江苏如东150MW海上（潮间带）示范风电场
- Country: China
- Location: Rudong County, Jiangsu province, East China Sea
- Coordinates: 30.504°N 121.260°E
- Status: Operational
- Construction began: 2011-06-21
- Commission date: 2012-11-23
- Construction cost: 500 million ¥

Wind farm
- Type: offshore
- Max. water depth: 8 m (26 ft)
- Distance from shore: 4 km (2 mi)
- Site area: 107 km^{2} (41 sq mi)

Power generation
- Nameplate capacity: 150 MW

The Longyuan Rudong Intertidal Wind Farm is a 150MW offshore wind farm close to the Rudong County, Jiangsu province, China.
