= Gozo Power Station =

Former power station in Gozo, Malta

- Country: Malta
- Location: Victoria, Gozo
- Coordinates: 36°2′27.495″N 14°14′23.236″E
- Status: Decommissioned
- Owner: Enemalta

The Gozo Power Station was a diesel electricity production facility located in Victoria, Gozo. It formed part of Malta's early power infrastructure and operated until January 1959.

== Overview ==
=== Commissioning ===
The Gozo Power Station started operating on 1 August 1926. Work started in 1925 and the total project cost Lm 3,516. Initially, the plant had had two diesel alternator engines of 44kW each and the usage of the electicity was limited to Victoria..

=== Expansion ===
In 1931, an alternator with the capacity of 75kW was added and the total capacity increased to 182kW. Over the years, electricity also started to be distributed beyond Victoria and in 1936 the introduction of a 3-phase 50-cycle system in Gozo was approved by the Government.

In 1949, a new unit with a capacity of 120kW was installed but due to the limitation of the old equipment, overall capacity only reached 180KW. 1951 saw the inauguration of a new alternator with a capacity of 200kW, thus also allowing the electricity to reach rural villages.

=== Decommissioning ===
Following a feasibility study conducted in 1954, the Government determined that it was more viable to serve Gozo via submarine cables from Malta. Two submarine cables were laid from Marfa to Comino and from Comino to Gozo in 1957, with these being commissioned in 1958. In January 1959, the Gozo Power Plant ceased operations.

== See also ==
- Marsa Power Station
- Delimara Power Station
- Energy in Malta
- Corradino Power Station
