= Enemalta =

Maltese energy company

Enemalta plc
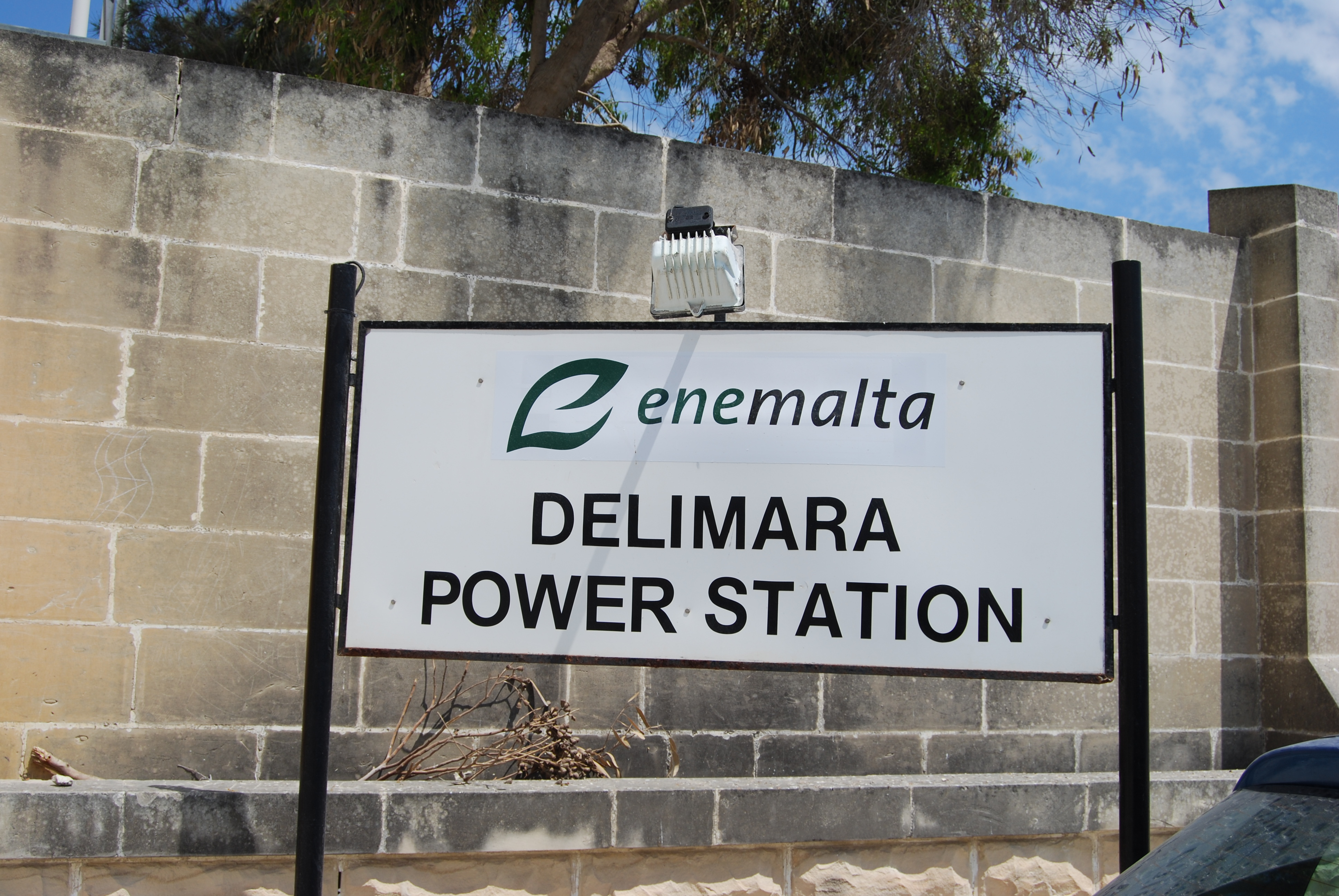
- Company type: Public Company
- Industry: Energy
- Founded: 1977
- Headquarters: Marsa
- Area served: Malta and Gozo
- Products: Energy Distribution
- Owner: Government of Malta, Shanghai Electric
- Number of employees: ca. 2000
- Website: www.enemalta.com.mt

Enemalta plc is the only Maltese energy company. It provides energy services in the Maltese Islands and is entrusted with the distribution of electricity, and the development of the national electricity distribution network. It employs approximately 600 people.

Enemalta operates the emergency plants of the Delimara Power Station (444 MW, started up in 1992) and coordinates the dispatch of energy from the various plants. The Marsa power plant (267 MW, commissioning in 1966) was shut down in 2014 and totally demolished two years later. The Malta–Sicily interconnector links the island with the Italian electricity network with a capacity of 200 MW since April 2015.

A power plant in Floriana (1896 to 1960), a power plant in Corradino (1939 to 1992) and Station A in Marsa (1953 to 1993) were operated by Enemalta until their shutdown.

Since Malta does not have its own resources, Enemalta relies entirely on imported fuels. In 2006 the two power plants of the Enemalta produced 2261189 MWh and released 0.8782 kg CO_{2} for every kilowatt hour generated, A substation is going to be built in Naxxar at Triq San Luqa.

== Energy transition in the 2010s ==
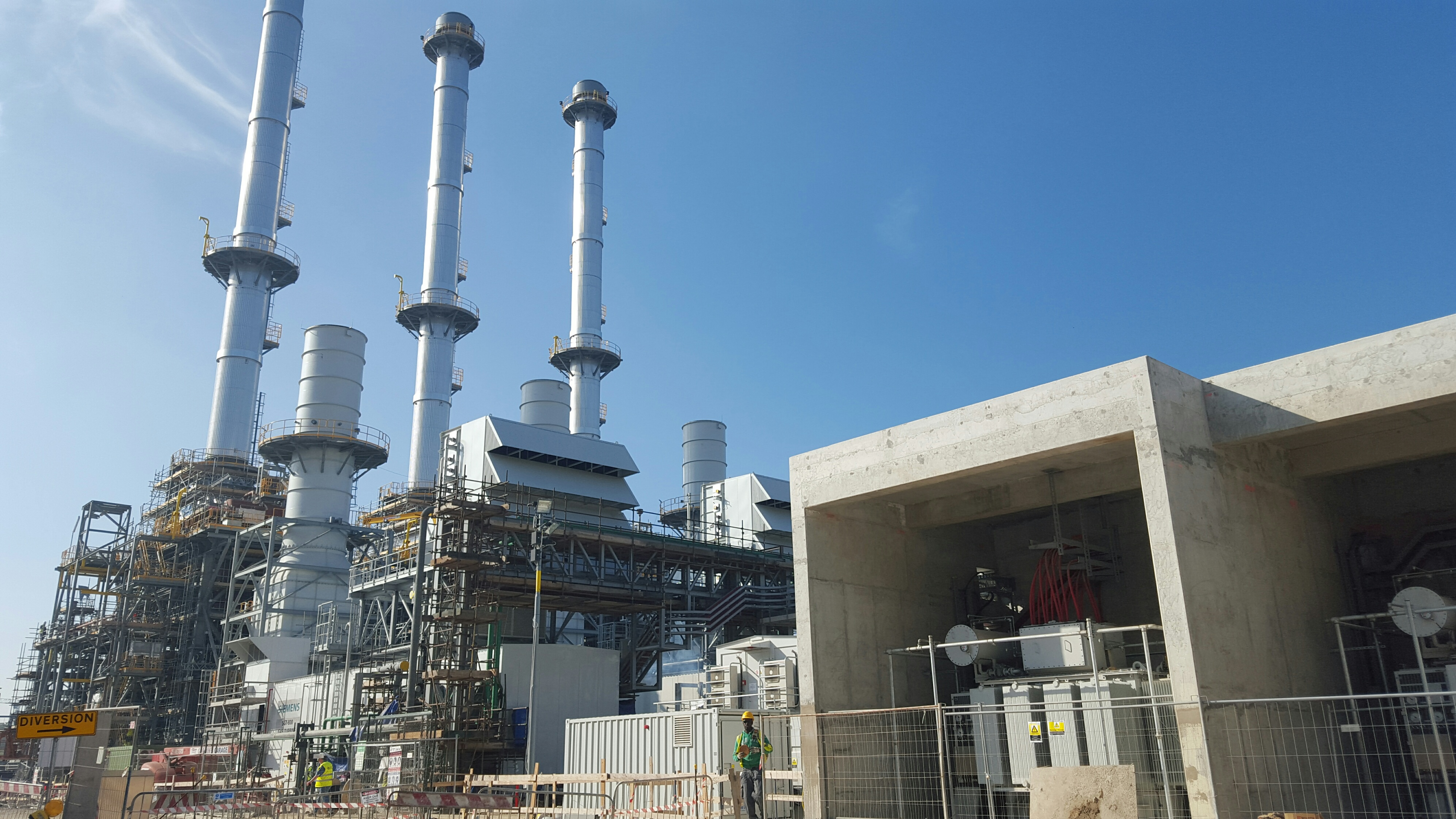
Delimara Power Station

Upon assuming office as Minister for Energy in 2013, Konrad Mizzi started implementing the Government's energy plan with the primary aim of reducing utility tariffs. Previously utility tariffs in Malta were considered amongst the highest tariffs in Europe, and following the reductions utility tariffs become the fourth cheapest in the European Union. This measure enabled the local industry to become more competitive.

This saw the transformation of the energy in Malta, contrasting with the situation when Mizzi was given the responsibility when Enemalta was close to declare bankruptcy, with €840 million in debt and was consecutively downgraded by Standard & Poor's. This affecting the credit ratings of the country at the time.

In December 2014 Shanghai Electric signed an agreement with the Government of Malta where it acquired a minority stake of 33.3% in the local energy producer Enemalta. The acquisition was valued at €250 million. The restructuring envisaged new investment in the local distribution system, as well as transition from oil-fired energy generation to cleaner technology, such as the Malta-Sicily interconnector, gas-fired plants and renewable energy sources. This is expected to increase the grid redundancy and flexibility. The Government of Malta retained the majority of share of the energy company.

Shanghai Electric was required to invest in the conversion to gas of the Phase 3 existing power plant which at present is powered by heavy fuel oil, valued at around €70million. In 2016, and following the investment by Shanghai Electric and the restructuring process that followed, Standard and Poor's upgraded Enemalta's rating to BB− with a stable outlook. Enemalta and Shanghai Electric established a joint venture to tap into renewable energy markets in Europe. They are jointly responsible for the development of the Mozura Wind Park project in Montenegro. In 2020 it was revealed that businessman Yorgen Fenech made €4.6 million through his company 17 Black from Enemalta's purchase of the wind farm venture in 2015. Yorgen Fenech stands accused of the assassination of journalist Daphne Caruana Galizia, who was investigating corruption in the Electrogas project. A homicide investigator testified under oath that the police worked on the assumption that the assassination was motivated by a desire to suppress information about Electrogas. Fenech, Keith Schembri, Paul Apap Bologna and others are facing criminal proceedings in connection with 17 Black.

EU Change in CO^{2} Emissions emissions 2015-2014
* EU aggregate excluding Sweden.
** Includes some Eurostat estimates.
: Data for Sweden are still under revision and therefore not presented in this table.
- Not applicable.

The third pillar of the energy plan will also result in the closure of the Malta power plant which has been operating since 1969. The Marsa power plant has been shut down, on cold standby, pending the completion of the new gas fired power plant. The local Opposition party criticised the Government of Malta that this plant has been shut down due to measures implemented by the previous Government and not due to the current Government's plans. However, the current Government's plan envisages the demolition of the 1992 Delimara Phase 1 Heavy Fuel Oil power plant.

Demolishing the 1992 power plant, would be impossible to achieve without a new power plant due to N-1 requirements. Over 700,000 tonnes CO_{2} were reduced by shutting down the Marsa power plant. Statistics from the Eurostat confirmed that Malta experienced the highest reduction in emissions in all the European Union.

The second pillar that would be sustaining cheaper utility tariffs in the long-term was the development of a gas fired power plant. The development of this project is based on a private-public partnership model. The Delimara Power and Gas project is being developed by Electrogas Malta Limited, a consortium that includes SOCAR, Siemens and Gem Holdings. The consortium has been restructured following Gasol departure. Enemalta would be purchasing electricity. The local opposition Party has been critical of this project since its details were announced, including the procurement process. However, following parliamentary questions in the European Parliament by Malta's European People's Party, the European Commission stated that there were no procurement violations.

Electrogas Malta Limited has recently won the award for Best European Energy Project which is organised by IJ Global. The project is expected to contribute greatly to the decrease in particulate matter by 90%. Through the Delimara Power and Gas project, Malta will be conforming for the first time, with the N-1 principle which is stipulated by European Union directives. Such concept enabled Malta to shift its financial resources onto other sectors, while simultaneously enjoying the benefits of modern and efficient infrastructure. The development of the gas fired power plant and the conversion to gas of another power plant is in line with the Energy policy of the European Union, that encourages the shift to gas in the energy sector.

The Gas power plant was officially opened in April 2017. The new power station was inaugurated minutes after the 25-year-old Delimara I power station was switched off. The old power station chimney, a 150 m structure in Malta was demolished in 2018.

== Political controversy ==
Questions have been raised regarding a number of agreements and arrangements made by Enemalta.

=== Možura Wind Farm ===
Investigations are being undertaken regarding Enemalta and the Možura Wind Farm project in Montenegro with accusations that 17 Black, a company secretly owned by Yorgen Fenech made €4.6 million profit in the acquisition by Enemalta of shares in Možura. The deal was first discussed by Enemalta in late 2014. After a board meeting on Enemalta in January 2015, a Seychelles company Cifidex entered into an agreement with the Spanish consortium licensed to run the 46 MW wind farm to buy the shares for 2.9 million euros.

The shares were acquired by Enemalta with 90% sold to a consortium of Shanghai Electric, Enemalta, Vestigo and Envision Energy for 10.3 million euros from Cifidex, which had completed their own purchase of the shares just two weeks earlier in December 2015 after Cifidex had been funded with 3m euro by 17 Black.

=== ElectroGas Malta ===
A December 2014 visit by Joseph Muscat as Prime Minister, his chief of staff Keith Schembri and Energy Minister Konrad Mizzi resulted in the signing of a memorandum to buy liquid natural gas (LNG) for 18 years from the State Oil Company of Azerbaijan Republic SOCAR as fuel for a new power station in Malta.

ElectroGas Malta (EGM) which won the contract to build the €510 million project had Yorgen Fenech as a director and a shareholder, Tumas energy, headed by Yorgen Fenech, was also a shareholder. In 2015 EGM was granted sole rights to sell SOCAR gas to Malta. EGM is contracted to sell electricity and LNG to Enemalta for 18 years. The first batch of LNG was bought by EGM from SOCAR for $113 million and sold by them to Enemalta for $153 million, further deliveries generated similar profits.

EGM took out a €450 million loan to finance the project, only secured following a €360 million state guarantee that was obtained following the assassination of journalist Daphne Caruana Galizia on 16 October 2017. Keith Schembri working with Yorgen Fenech got the government to extend the guarantee.
