= Jesuit Hill Battery =

- Batterija tal-Għolja tal-Ġiżwiti
- Part of the French blockade batteries
- Marsa, Malta
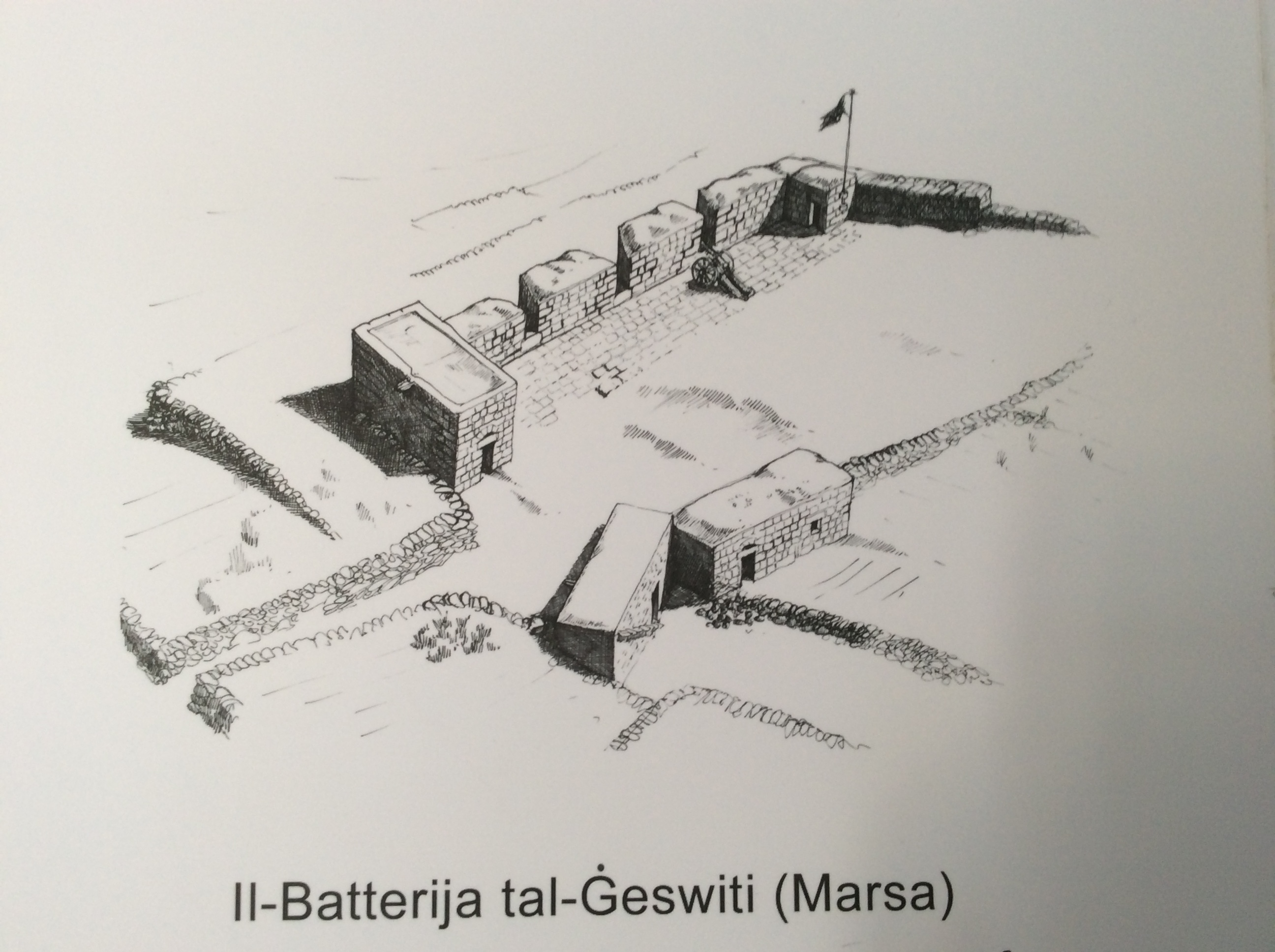
- Reconstruction of Jesuit Hill Battery by Stephen C. Spiteri at the Fortifications Interpretation Centre

Site information
- Type: Artillery battery

Location
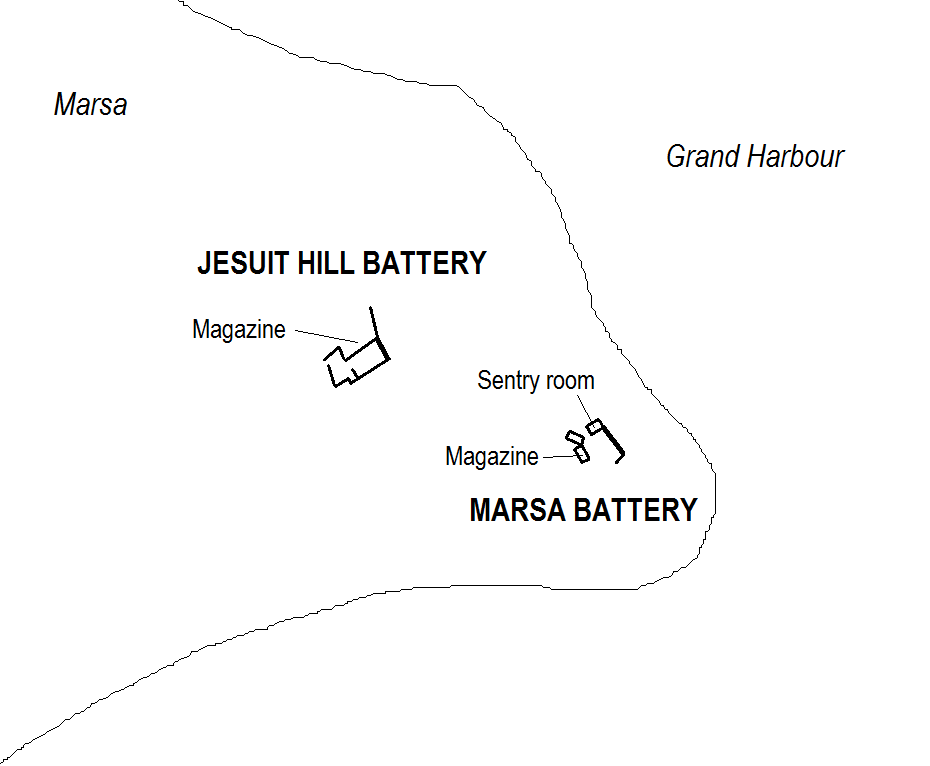
- Map of Jesuit Hill Battery and Marsa Battery
- Coordinates: 35°52′57.4″N 14°29′52.9″E

Site history
- Built: 1799
- Built by: Maltese insurgents
- In use: 1799–1800
- Materials: Limestone
- Fate: Demolished
- Battles/wars: Siege of Malta (1798–1800)

Jesuit Hill Battery (Maltese: Batterija tal-Għolja tal-Ġiżwiti), also known as Jesuit Battery or Point Cortin Battery, was an artillery battery in Marsa, Malta, built by Maltese insurgents during the French blockade of 1798–1800. It was part of a chain of batteries, redoubts and entrenchments encircling the French Military's position in Marsamxett and the Grand Harbour.

== History ==
=== Description ===
The battery was built on high ground known as Jesuit Hill. Marsa Battery was located nearby on lower ground close to the shoreline. The battery was small, and consisted of a small masonry parapet with two embrasures, a magazine grafted into the terrace on one side, and a flanking rubble wall on the other. The magazine was camouflaged and protected by a thick layer of soil. A large building at the rear served as barracks or a blockhouse. The battery was considered as an advanced post of the Tas-Samra Camp and was manned by men from Qormi. It was armed with two cannons.

=== Use and dismantlement ===
The battery fired its first shot on 5 April 1799.

Like the other French blockade fortifications, Jesuit Hill Battery was dismantled, possibly sometime after 1814. No traces of the battery can be seen today, and the area is now heavily industrialised. The site of the battery is now occupied by the Marsa Power Station.
