= Marsa Battery =

- Batterija tal-Marsa
- Part of the French blockade batteries
- Marsa, Malta
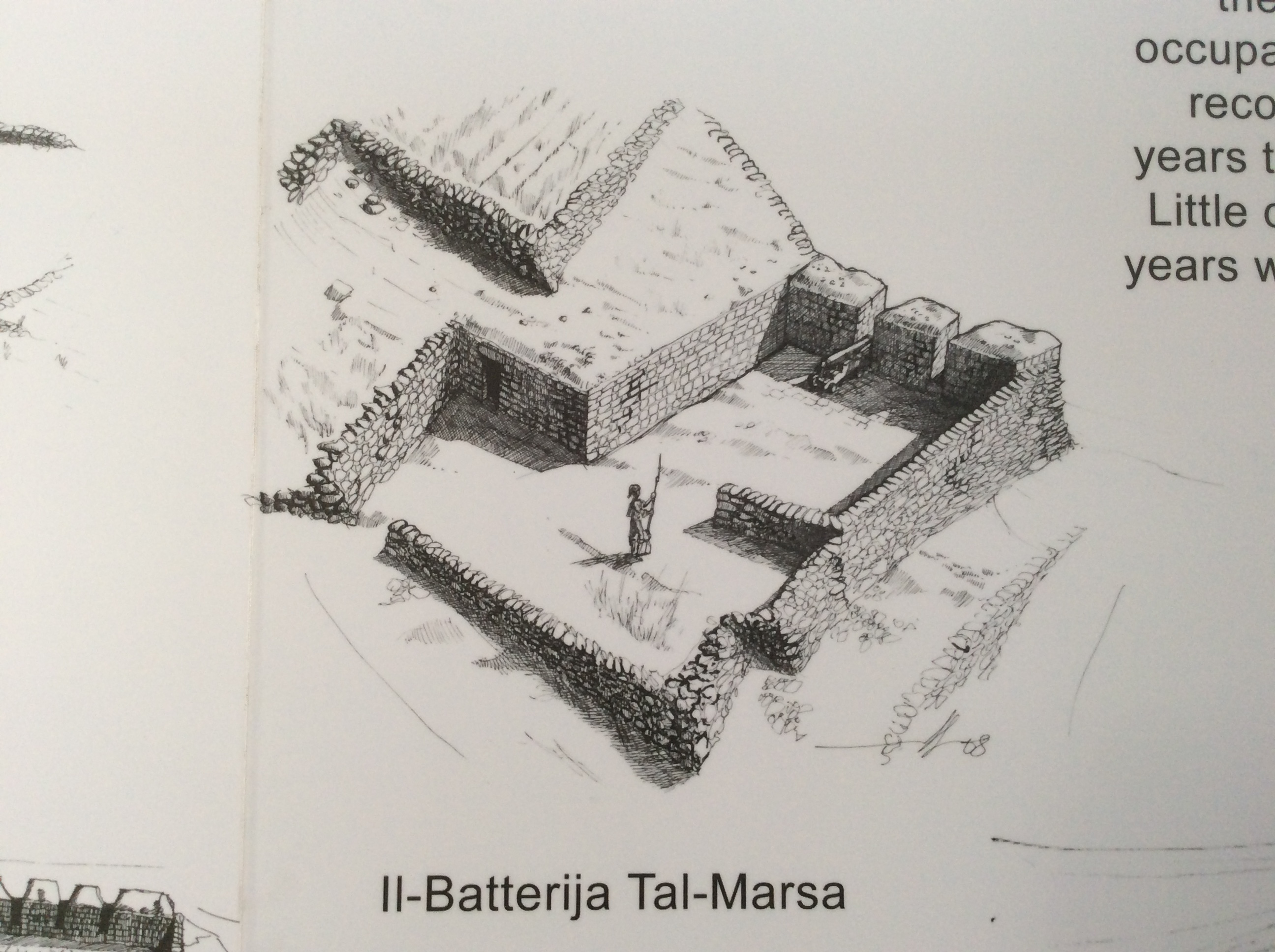
- Reconstruction of Marsa Battery by Stephen C. Spiteri at the Fortifications Interpretation Centre

Site information
- Type: Artillery battery

Location
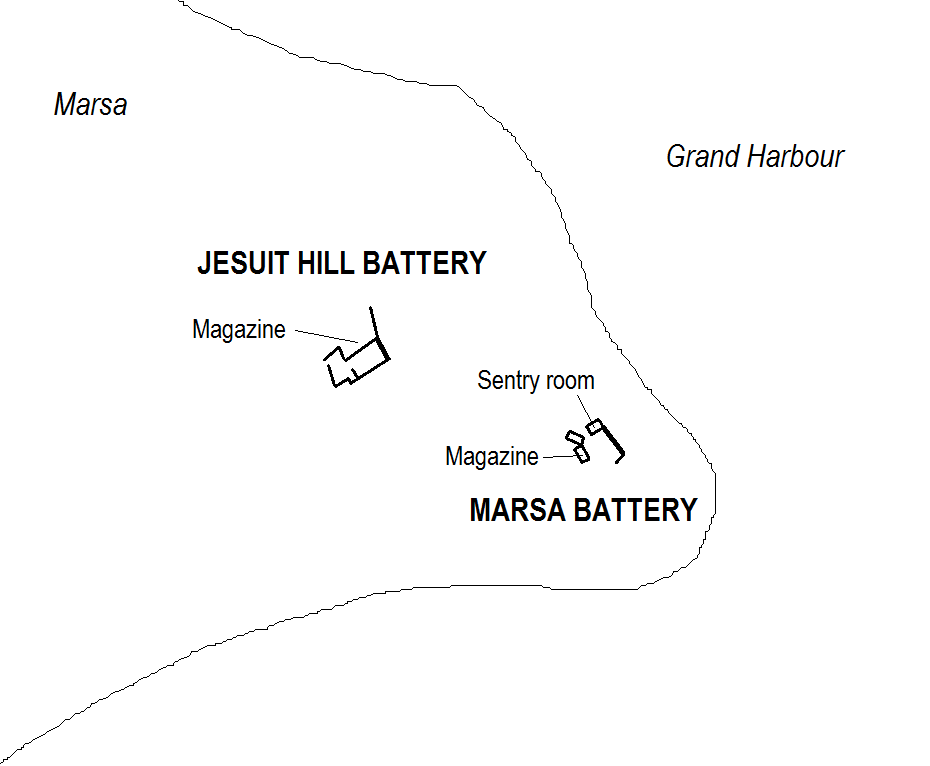
- Map of Marsa Battery and Jesuit Hill Battery
- Coordinates: 35°52′54.1″N 14°30′02.6″E

Site history
- Built: c. 1798
- Built by: Maltese insurgents
- In use: c. 1798–1800
- Materials: Limestone
- Fate: Demolished
- Battles/wars: Siege of Malta (1798–1800)

Marsa Battery (Maltese: Batterija tal-Marsa) was an artillery battery in Marsa, Malta, built by Maltese insurgents during the French blockade of 1798–1800. It was part of a chain of batteries, redoubts and entrenchments encircling the French positions in Marsamxett and the Grand Harbour.

The battery was built at the bottom of Jesuit Hill, close to the shoreline. Jesuit Hill Battery was located nearby on higher ground. The battery was small, and consisted of a small masonry parapet with three embrasures, a hardstone gun platform, a sentry room on the left, and a flanking rubble wall on the right. A magazine was also built to the rear of the battery. Marsa Battery was designed by Salvatore Camilleri from Valletta.

Like the other French blockade fortifications, Marsa Battery was dismantled, possibly sometime after 1814. No traces of the battery can be seen today, and the area is now heavily industrialized. The site of the battery is now occupied by the Marsa Power Station.

Apart from the Battery on the hill, the insurgents built another smaller battery close to the seashore which was also demolished after the blockade. During the British period a battery, known as Ta' Cejlu Battery, was built for its eventual use in WWII - which no longer exits today. The battery was a typical anti-aircraft warfare battery, one of a series of batteries built around Malta. The latter was located at the top of the Jesuit's Hill, a strategic position in the Grand Harbour.
