= Delimara Power Station =

LNG power station in Delimara, Marsaxlokk, Malta

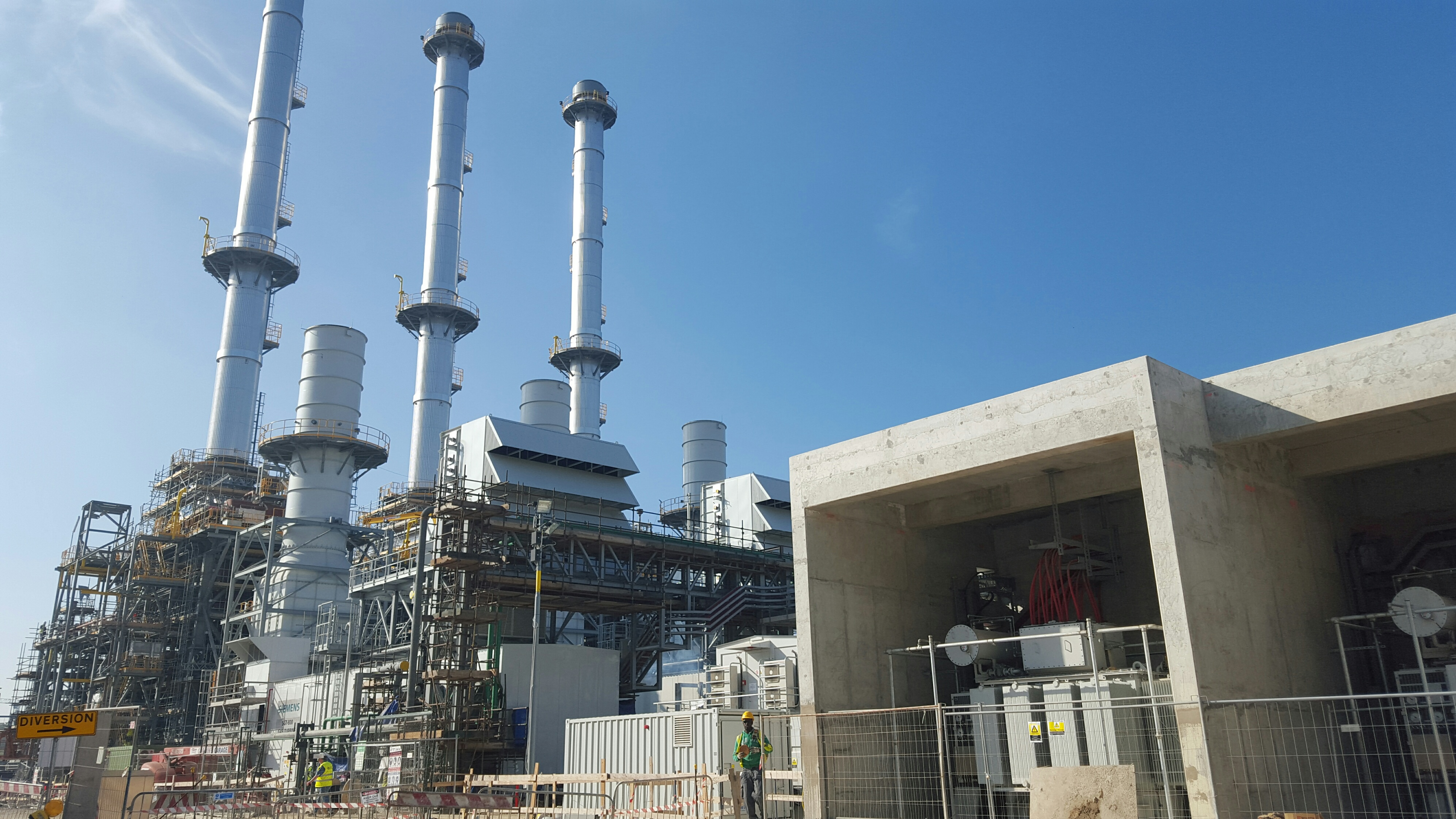
- Country: Malta
- Location: Delimara, Marsaxlokk
- Coordinates: 35°49′58″N 14°33′21″E
- Status: in operation
- Construction began: 1992
- Owner: Enemalta

Thermal power station
- Primary fuel: LNG

Power generation
- Nameplate capacity: 537.8 MW

External links
- Website: Enemalta Delimara power station
- Commons: Related media on Commons

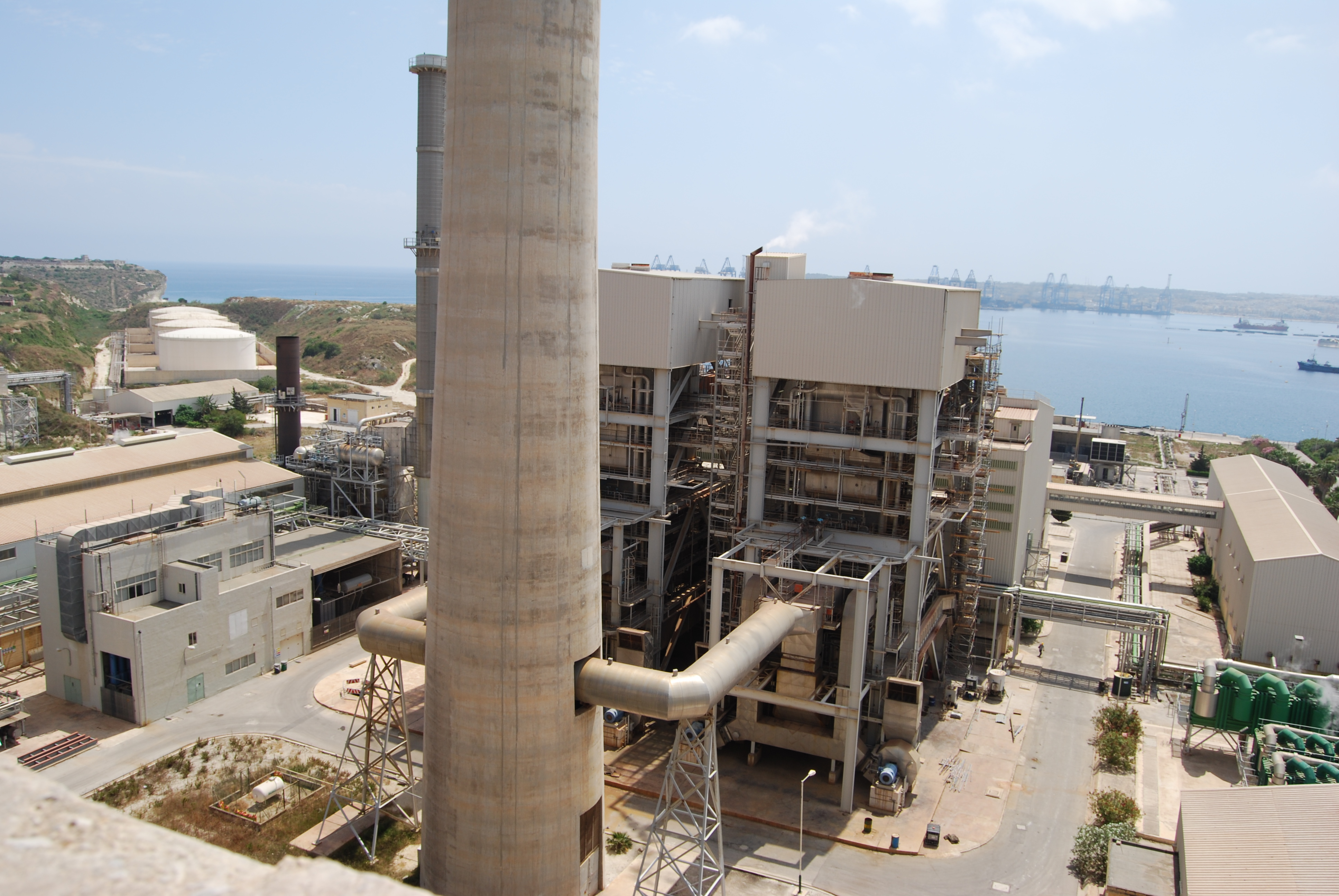
In the center of the picture are the two steam boilers, in the foreground the chimney, directly to the left the exhaust gas chimney of the gas turbine, on the left in the background the oil tanks.

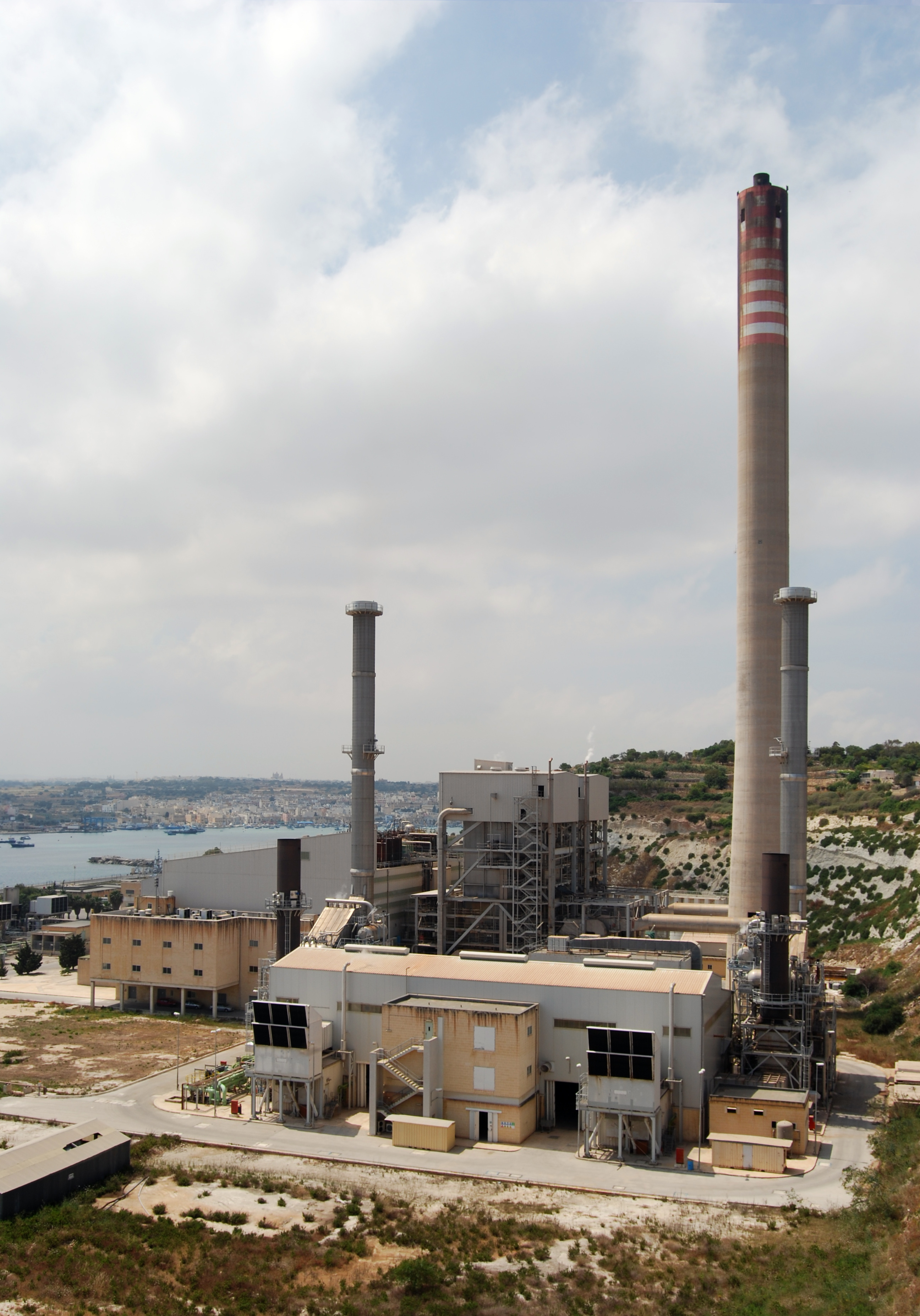
The power plant during construction in 2009

The Delimara power station is located near Marsaxlokk in the southeast of Malta and is the newest power plant in Malta. It was put into operation in 1992 and redeveloped to LNG in the 2010s.

== Setup ==
The Delimara Power Station includes four electricity generation plants, with a total combined nominal installed capacity of 537.8 MW. The two units in regular operation are:

- DPS Phase 4, a 205 MW natural gas-fired CCGT system commissioned in 2017, operated by Electrogas Malta
- DPS Phase 3, a 152.8 MW diesel engine plant from 2012, re-fitted to run on natural gas and gasoil, instead of heavy fuel oil, in 2017, operated by Delimara 3 Power Generation Ltd

The power station also includes two gasoil-fired plants, which are used as standby power generation capacity during emergencies or lack of other power sources, for a combined nominal capacity of 180 MW:

- 1994 DPS Phase 2A OCGT
- 1999 DPS Phase 2B CCGT

The power station is connected to Malta's electricity network through four 132 kV and six 33 kV outgoing feeder cables.

== History ==
The power plant was put into operation in 1992. The 150-meter high chimney of the power plant is the tallest structure in Malta.

Two steam power plants fuelled with heating oil, each with an electrical output of 60 MW, have been in operation since 1992. The heating oil has a sulfur content of 1%. Two gas turbine power plants, each with an output of 37 MW, have been in operation since 1994. The total power of the power plant is 304 MW.

As the technology of the Marsa power plant is out of date, closure of the plant was discussed ahead of Malta's entry into the EU. Part of the electricity production was relocated to the more modern Delimara power plant and the EU limit values for emissions could thus be reached. However, the fine dust emissions of both plants did not yet meet the EU standard. The total carbon dioxide emissions of the power plant in 2006 amounted to 810,477 tons.

In September 2008, a routine check revealed that a small amount of water and heating oil had leaked out. The oil load was at least ten cubic meters of heating oil. Neither the environment nor the power plant or its personnel suffered any damage, but the competent authorities were nevertheless immediately informed.

Under Joseph Muscat's government, the new energy policy of Malta envisaged the demolition of the 1992 Delimara Phase 1 Heavy Fuel Oil power plant. Demolishing the 1992 power plant would be impossible to achieve without a new power plant due to N-1 requirements. The development of a gas-fired power plant was tasked on a private-public partnership model. The Delimara Power and Gas project was developed by Electrogas Malta Limited, a consortium that includes SOCAR, Siemens and Gem Holdings. The consortium has been restructured following Gasol departure.

The Nationalist Party. the independent media and various pressure groups criticised the project, including the procurement process and accused the government of blatant corruption. In 2017 investigative journalist Daphne Caruana Galizia was assassinated in a car bomb after exposing corruption in the Electrogas deal.

In 2014 the Phase 3 power plant was sold by Enemalta to Shanghai Electric who set up D3 [Delimara 3] Generation Limited to run the plant. €100 million was injected directly into Enemalta and €150 million for the Delimara 3 plant (BWSC plant). €70 million was to be invested for the conversion of the plant to gas.
