= Energy in Malta =

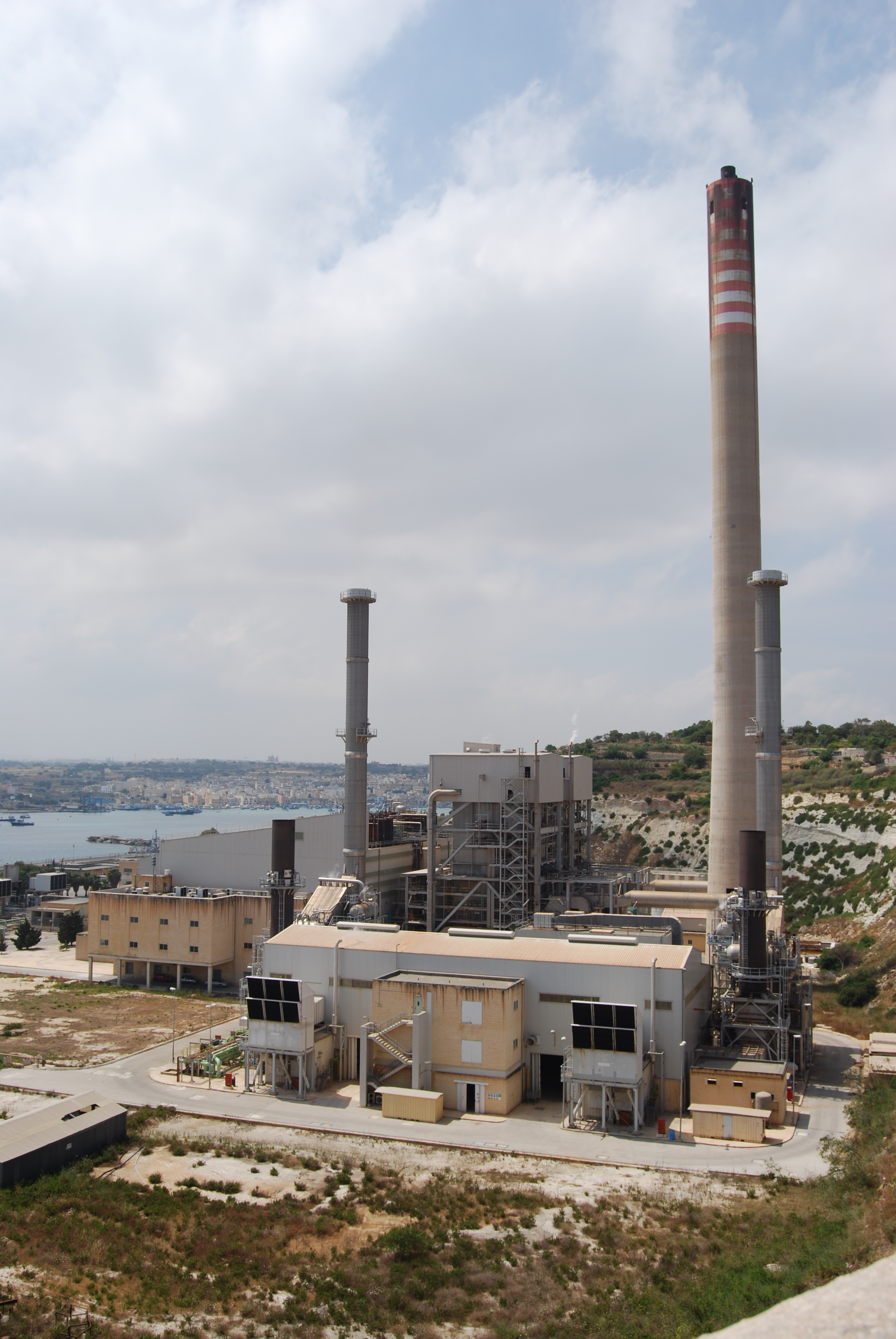
Delimara Power Station

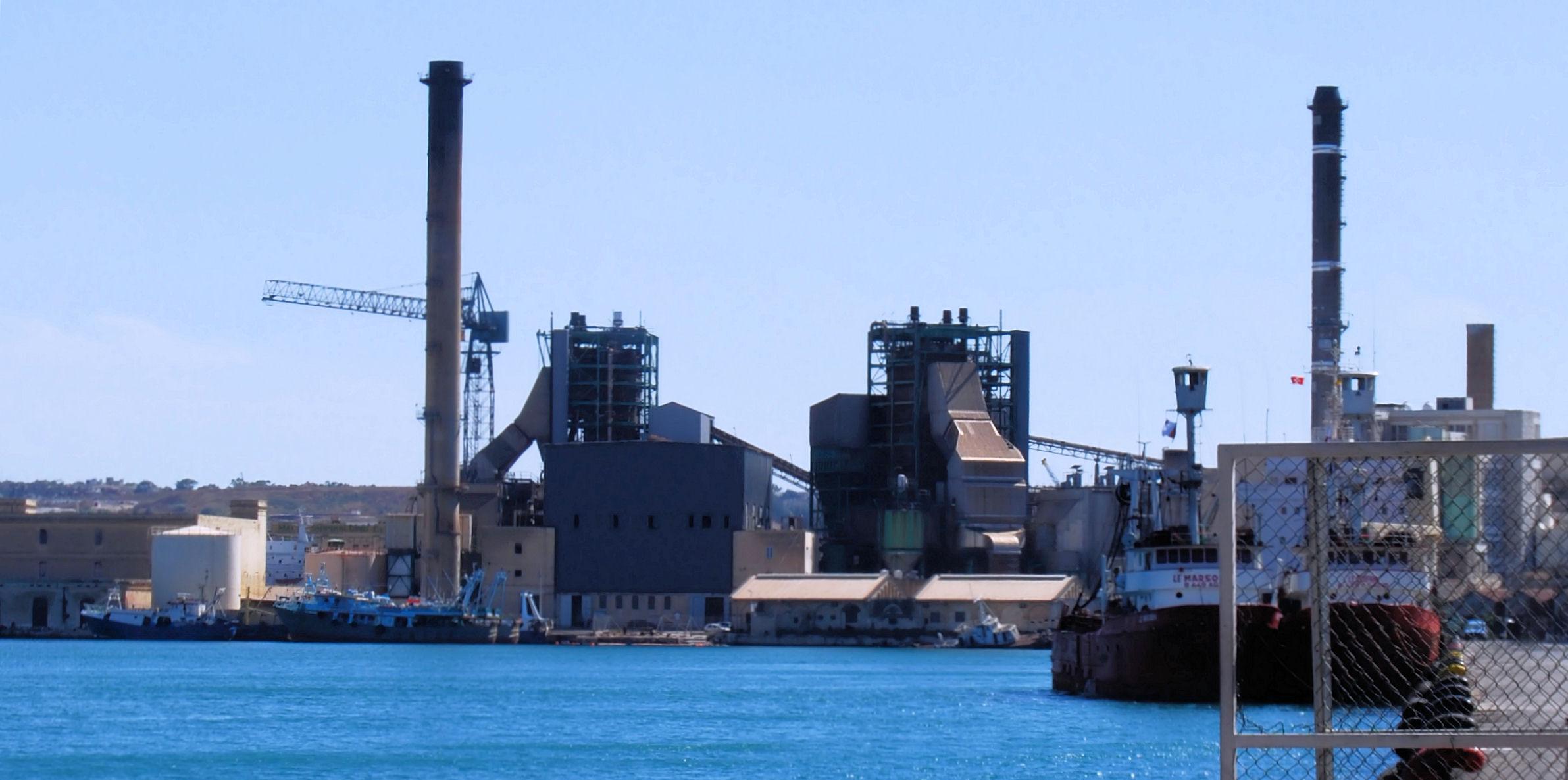
Marsa Power Station

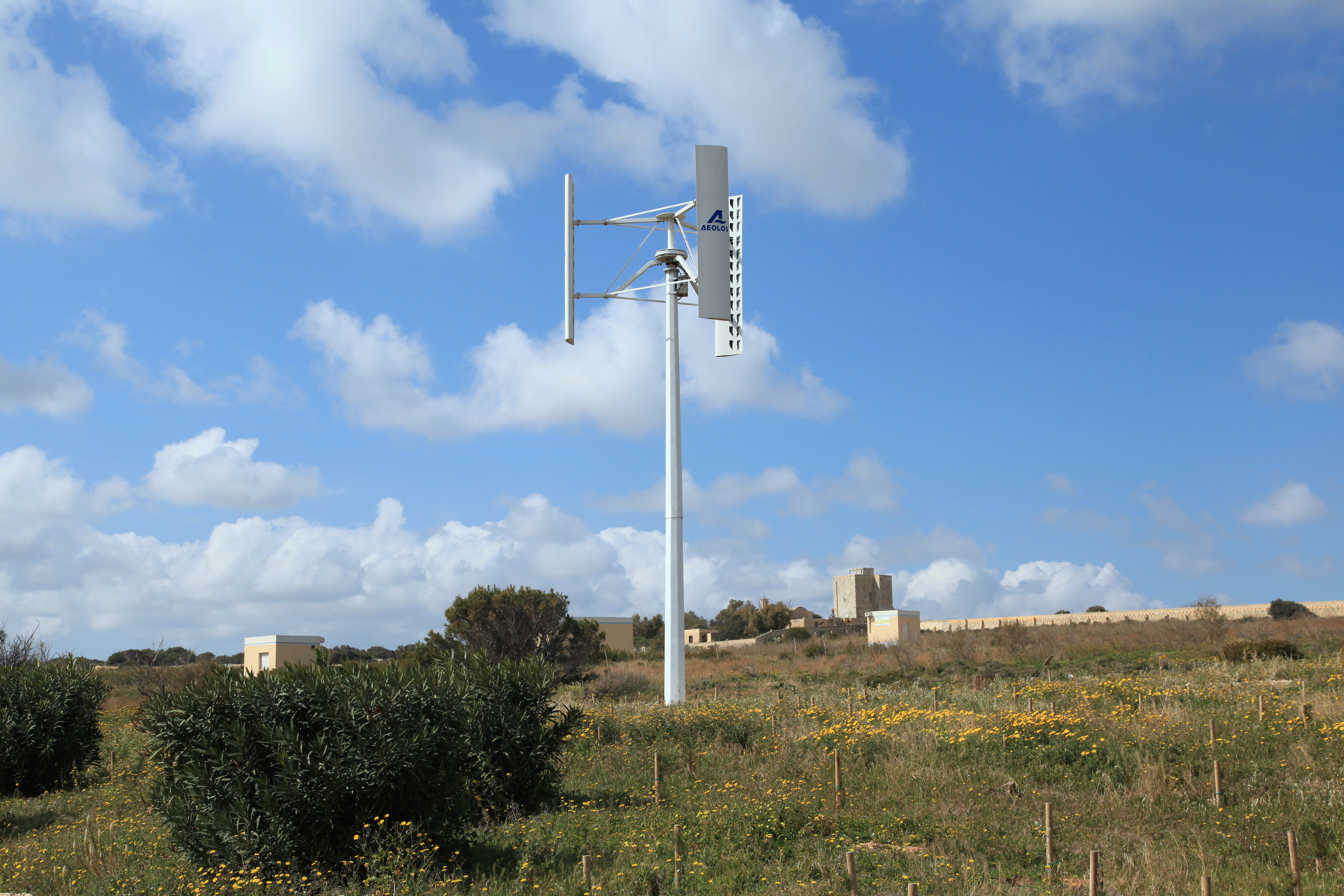
Wind turbine in Malta

Energy in Malta describes energy production, consumption and import in Malta. Malta has no domestic resource of fossil fuels and no gas distribution network, and relies overwhelmingly on imports of fossil fuels and electricity to cover its energy needs. Since 2015, the Malta–Sicily interconnector allows Malta to be connected to the European power grid and import a significant share of its electricity.

At 4.9%, Malta had the lowest share of renewables as part of gross inland energy consumption in the EU in 2017.

The specific needs of Malta as an island state with regard to energy policy are recognised in EU law. In particular, Malta has unique automatic derogations from Articles 9 (unbundling of transmission systems and transmission system operators), 26 (unbundling of distribution system operators), 32 (third-party access) and 33 (market opening and reciprocity) of the Electricity Directive 2009/72/EC.

The energy intensity of Malta was 85.3 kg of oil equivalent per €1,000 of GDP 2017, which is relatively low compared to other EU countries.

Final energy consumption was 495 ktoe in 2017. Transport accounted for the largest share of this final energy consumption, at 209 ktoe, followed by services at 126 ktoe, households at 94 ktoe and industry at 57 ktoe.

Malta has a high proportion of petrol to diesel cars and a limited number of alternative fuel vehicles. In 2017, 68% of passenger cars were petrol cars, 32% diesel and 0.47% powered by alternative fuels.

Energy Overview Malta
	2010	2011	2012	2013	2014	2015	2016	2017
Gross Electricity Production (GWh)	2.113	2.169	2.268	2.216	2.170	1.203	723	1.479
Final Energy Consumption (ktoe)	401	338	407	421	435	459	460	495
Share of fossil fuels in gross available energy (%)	99.8	N/A				95.2	93.7	96.1
Overall Import Dependency (%)	99.0	N/A				97.3	101.1	102.9

== Energy generation ==
As of 2017, most of the electricity generated in Malta was from natural gas, with oil as a backup. Natural gas has only been used for generation on Malta since CCGT systems were installed at Delimara Power Station in 2015, before which oil was the main fuel used. Oil has been the primary fuel for electricity generation for many decades before 2015, although Malta also possessed coal generation capacity from 1980 until 1996. Renewable energies have a small but growing share of the electricity generation mix. Regarding nuclear energy, Malta does not generate electricity from nuclear power and has no plans to develop a nuclear power programme.

Malta has four electricity plants operational and the total combined nominal installed capacity is 537.8 MW. The Malta–Sicily Interconnector, which has been in operation since April 2015, allows for an electricity link between the Maltese Islands and the Italian electricity market has bidirectional flow capacity of 200 MW. This is said to have increased Malta's energy security and supply flexibility.

Malta has some of the lowest household electricity prices in the EU. In 2018, the average household electricity price was 0.1306 EUR/kWh, only higher than those in Hungary, Lithuania and Bulgaria.

Year	Total Electricity Generation (MWh)	of which via interconnector	Percentage
2008	2,275,892	N/A	
2009	2,167,640	N/A	
2010	2,113,112	N/A	
2011	2,168,553	N/A	
2012	2,268,627	N/A	
2013	2,216,101	N/A	
2014	2,170,225	N/A	
2015	2,257,218	1,053,981	46%
2016	2,247,523	1,526,689	67%
2017	2,376,786	897,006	37%

== Renewable energy ==
As of 2017, renewables represented 4.9% of gross inland energy consumption and 6.6% of gross electricity generation in Malta, some of the lowest shares in the European Union. Most of the renewable energy generated in Malta is solar energy, with some wind and Combined Heat and Power (CHP) generation. While the potential for solar and wind energy is substantial according to the EU, concerns over the loss of limited countryside land as well as potential visual pollution of both onshore and offshore projects present a significant challenge. As renewable energy projects can affect the appearance of coastlines, rural landscapes and Malta's historic towns and villages, they have also come into conflict with the country's important tourism sector.

The European Union Directive 2009/28/EC set Malta's target share of renewable energy at 10% by the year 2020.

The National Renewable Energy Action Plan for Malta was submitted in July 2010. According to the NREAP, Malta's renewable energy mix in 2020 was intended to be:

- Transport: 37 ktoe
- Wind: 0.3 TWh or 22 ktoe
- Biomass: 0.1 TWh or 12 ktoe
- Wind power: 15 MW onshore and 95 MW offshore
- Solar: 28 MW photovoltaic and 3 ktoe thermal.
- Electricity: 86 GWh (7 ktoe) from solid biomass and 50 GWh (4 ktoe) from biogas.
- Heat: 0 ktoe from solid biomass and 2 ktoe from biogas.

Renewable Energy Generation in Malta (GWh)
	2013	2014	2015	2016	2017^{p}
Estimated electricity generated from renewables	35.447	74.890	101.693	135.525	165.109
From photovoltaic cells	29.470	68.380	94.990	127.160	155.313
other *	5.977	6.510	6.703	8.365	9.796
^{p} Provisional * Renewable energy produced from micro wind turbines and Combined Heat and Power (CHP) plants

=== Wind power ===
According to the EU fact sheet in January 2007 the potential of wind energy in Malta is substantial. In 2010 the investment subsidy of 25% was available for private consumers for wind power up to 3.7 kW (urban wind turbines). Excess electricity fed into the grid was purchased at EUR 0.07 per kWh.

Large-scale offshore wind projects have been considered in Malta, yet have so far not been realised. Unofficial consultations were held before 2013, yet were said to have ended following a change of government in that year. Current wind power generation in Malta remains very low.

=== Solar power ===
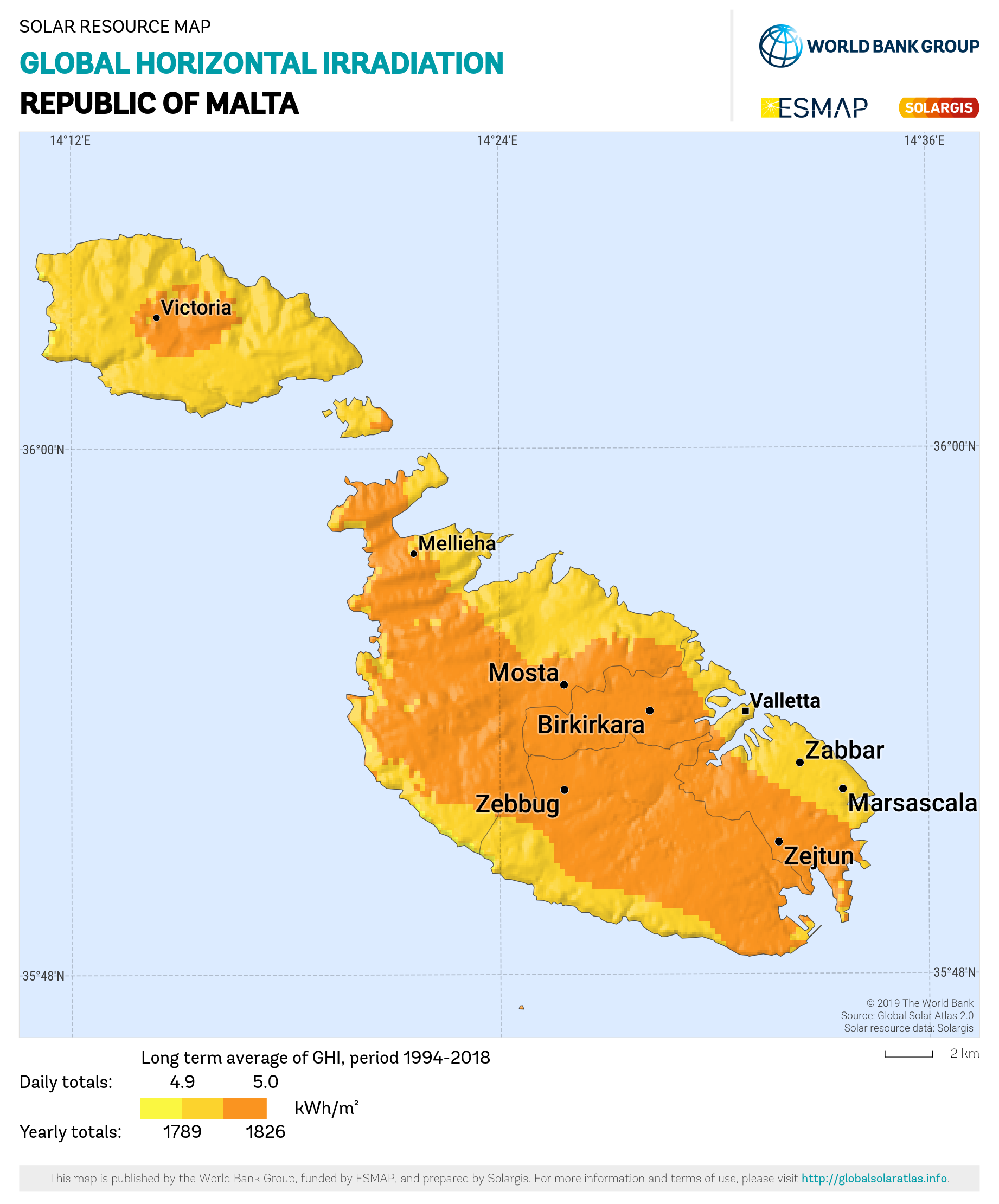
Solar potential of Malta

Power generation from photovoltaic (PV) solar cells is increasing in Malta, with total kWp (kilowatt peak) capacity growing by 16.9% from 2017 to 2018. Domestic rooftop installations account for the overwhelming majority of PV installations, and hold 52.1% of total kWp capacity. As of December 2019, EU-funded government grants allowed households to reclaim 50% of the installation costs up to a value of €2,300 from the government. Grants for rooftop solar water heaters, which are popular in Malta, as well as solar feed-in tariffs are also available to help people consider the installation of solar panels.

In October 2017, the Planning Authority approved the 'Solar Farm Policy', aimed at providing appropriate criteria for potential future utility-scale solar farm developments with minimal negative impacts on the landscape, particularly targeting disused quarries, car parks, industrial areas and large rooftops. Since then, multiple utility-scale solar farms been proposed to the planning authority. An 8,000 panel site has been approved at a disused landfill site near Birżebbuġa in February 2019.

A 2018 pilot project led by MCAST was conducted to investigate the potential of floating off-shore solar farms to provide energy for Malta.

=== Biogas power ===
As part of organic waste treatment, Malta's waste management company Wasteserv uses the country's organic waste in an anaerobic digester plant to generate biogas for electricity production. So far this has reached a capacity of 2.58GWh of electricity in 2021

== See also ==
- Malta–Sicily interconnector
