= Malta–Sicily interconnector =

Submarine power cable

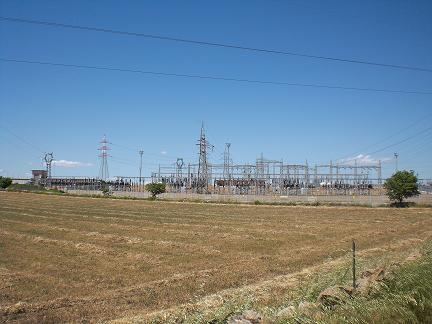
- Ragusa's substation.

Location
- Country: Malta; Italy
- General direction: north–south–north (bidirectional)
- From: Magħtab, Naxxar in Malta
- Passes through: Malta Channel
- To: Ragusa in Sicily, Italy

Ownership information
- Owner: Enemalta

Construction information
- Cable manufacturer: Nexans
- Cable layer: C/S Nexans Skagerrak
- Construction cost: €182 million
- Commissioned: 2015

Technical information
- Type: Submarine cable underground cable
- Current type: HVAC
- Total length: 120 km (75 mi)
- Capacity: 200 MW
- AC voltage: 220 kV

The Malta–Sicily interconnector is the submarine power cable which connects the power grid of Malta with the Italian Transmission Network managed by Terna, which is part of the European grid. It was constructed in 2014-2015, and supplies roughly 1/3 of Malta's electrical power (2024).

== Technical characteristics ==
The 95-kilometre (59 mi) long subsea cable starts at Magħtab, Qalet Marku in Malta and it runs to Marina di Ragusa in Sicily, Italy. From there it is connected to the Ragusa substation, which is of the Italian TSO Terna, via a 25 kilometres (16 mi) underground cable.

The cable and 132/220 kV substation in Malta is provided by Nexans. The cable has capacity of 200 MW and it uses 220 kV high voltage alternating current. The interconnector is operated by Enemalta, the Maltese power company. In the 2014 the cable was laid in the sea by the ship C/S Nexans Skagerrak of the Company Nexans. The interconnector became operational in March 2015. The project cost €182 million.

== Economic impact ==
The cable allows Malta to exchange electricity with the Italian power market, i.e. the island can both import and export electricity from Italy through the interconnector. The creation of this subsea cable ended Malta's previous electricity's isolation and diversified its mix of energy sources. In February 2015, European Commission underlined that Malta's interconnection level would go from 0% to approximately 35% with the new interconnector.

== Problems ==
In December 2019 power outages in Malta were being caused by a failure of the interconnector cable having been damaged by a ship's anchor. In 2019 the interconnector supplied 23.1% of generated power.

== Sites ==
Site	Coordinates
Substation of Ragusa	36°52′47″N 14°40′53″E
Italian submarinecable terminal, Marina di Ragusa	36°46′48″N 14°34′10″E
Maltese submarinecable terminal, Qalet Marku	35°56′36″N 14°26′59″E
Substation in Magħtab (in project)	35°56′19″N 14°26′17″E

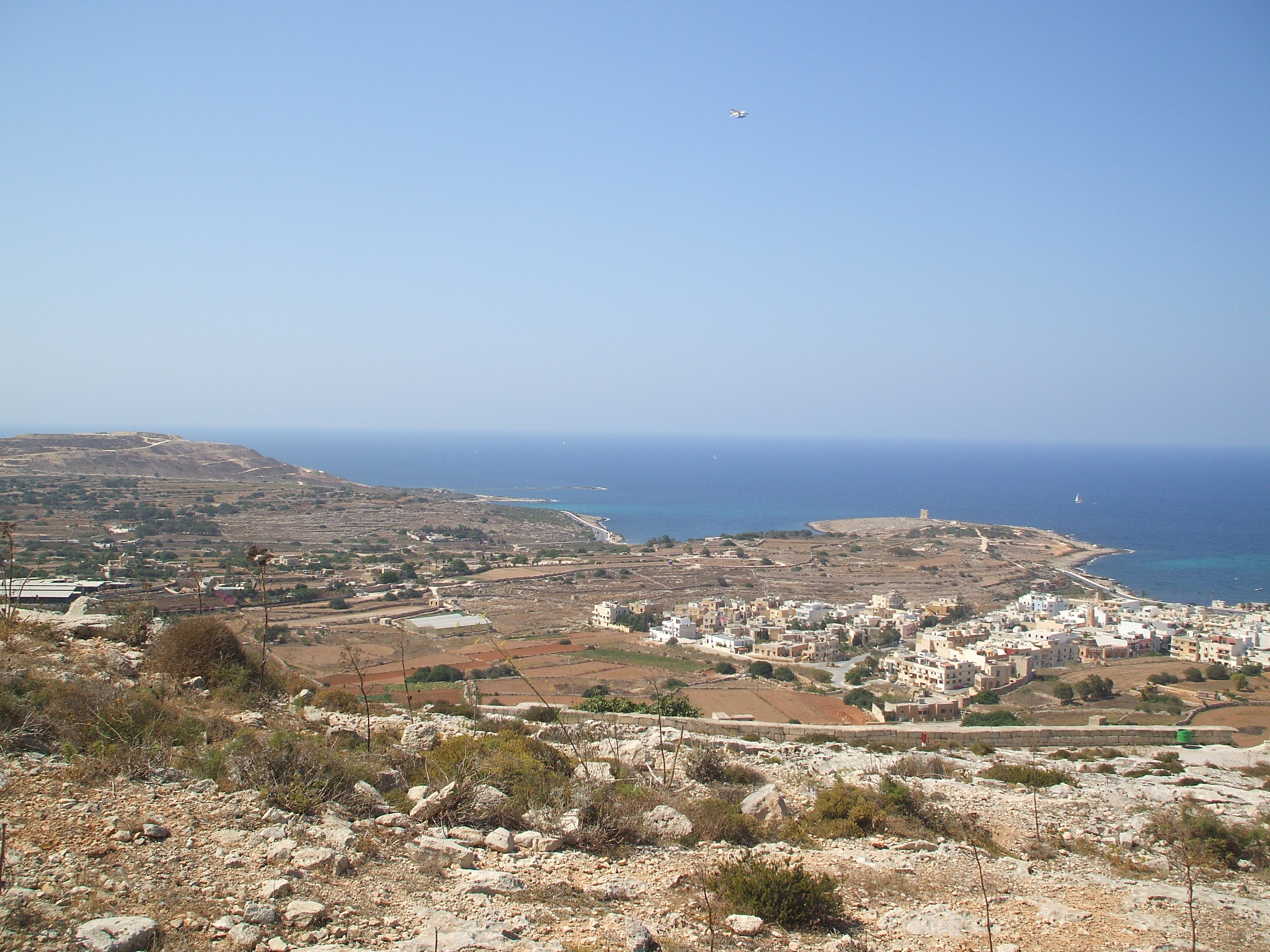
The bay of Qalet Marku, Maltese terminal of the submarine cable.

== See also ==
- Energy in Malta
- Energy in Italy
- List of high voltage underground and submarine cables
- Pylons of Messina – Historic high-voltage towers in Italy
