= Marsa, Malta =

Marsa Il-Marsa
- Local council
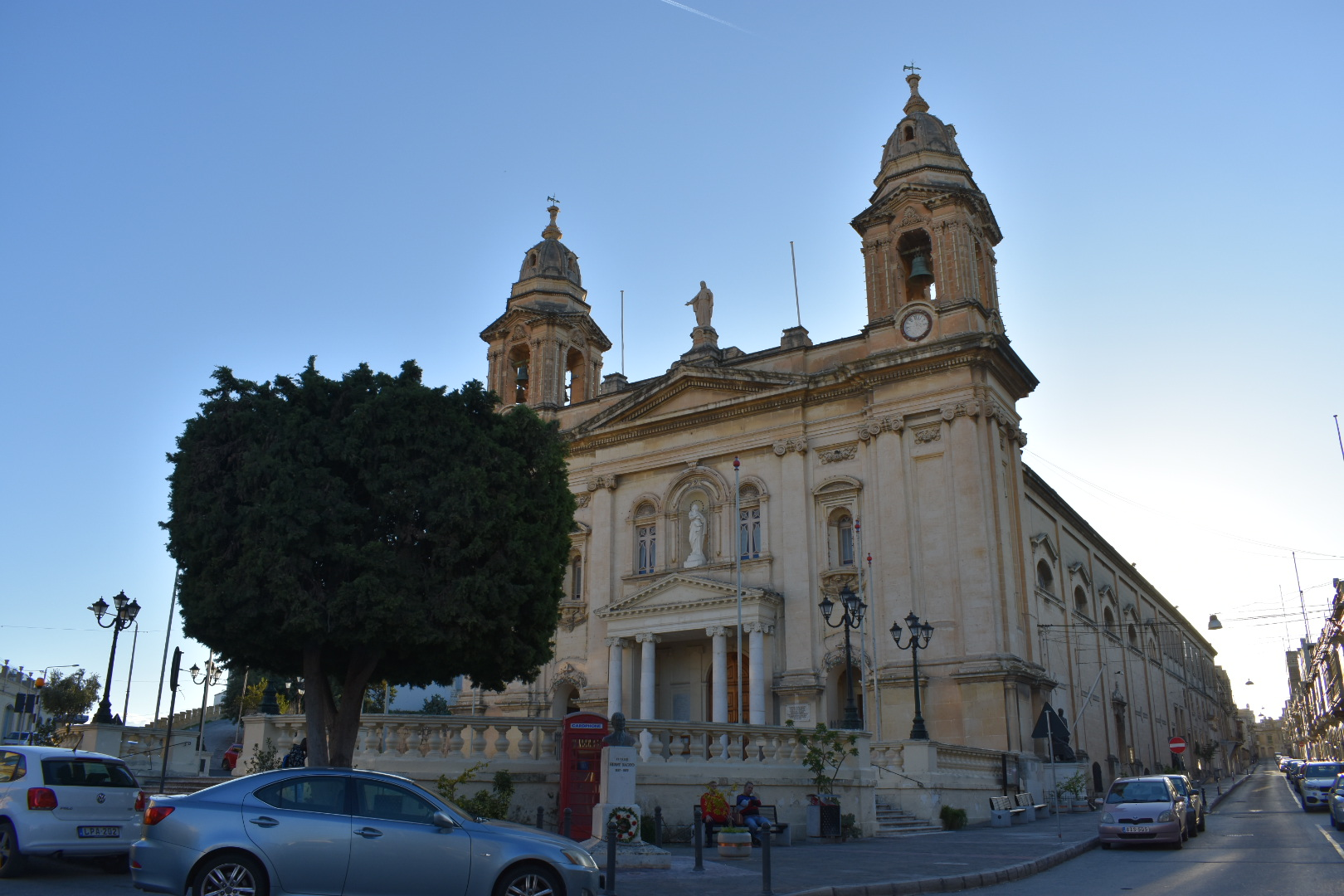
- View of Marsa parish church

- Flag Coat of arms

- Coordinates: 35°53′0″N 14°29′41″E
- Country: Malta
- Region: Southern Region
- District: Southern Harbour District
- Borders: Floriana, Ħamrun, Luqa, Paola, Qormi

Government
  - Mayor: Luke Farrugia (PL)

Area
  - Total: 2.8 km^{2} (1.1 sq mi)

Population (Jul. 2024)
  - Total: 5,887
  - Density: 2,100/km^{2} (5,400/sq mi)
- Demonym(s): Marsi (m), Marsija (f), Marsin (pl)
- Time zone: UTC+1 (CET)
  - Summer (DST): UTC+2 (CEST)
- Postal code: MRS
- Dialing code: 356
- ISO 3166 code: MT-26
- Patron saint: Maria Regina; Holy Trinity
- Day of festa: Last Sunday of August; First Sunday of June
- Website: Official website

Marsa (Maltese: Il-Marsa) is a town in the Southern Region of Malta, with a population of 4,401 people as of March 2014. The name Marsa means "the harbour".

== History ==
Marsa is located on the Marsa Creek, a body of water formed by the flow of water from wadis in high ground near the sea. The creek includes the Grand Harbour which the town is based on. A port was first established at Marsa by the Phoenicians. Remains of Roman constructions have been found close to the town.

At the arrival of the Order of St John in Malta, a particular cultivated garden was among the few places observed. A vital spring for the Grand Harbour was located on site. It is thought a foundry of the Order may have been located at Marsa. During the Great Siege of Malta of 1565, Marsa was used as a camp by troops of the Ottoman Empire. Following their defeat, Marsa became a barony containing a number of vineyards. A noteworthy bridge was located in Marsa which facilitated the road from Birgu to the area of Valletta and vice versa.

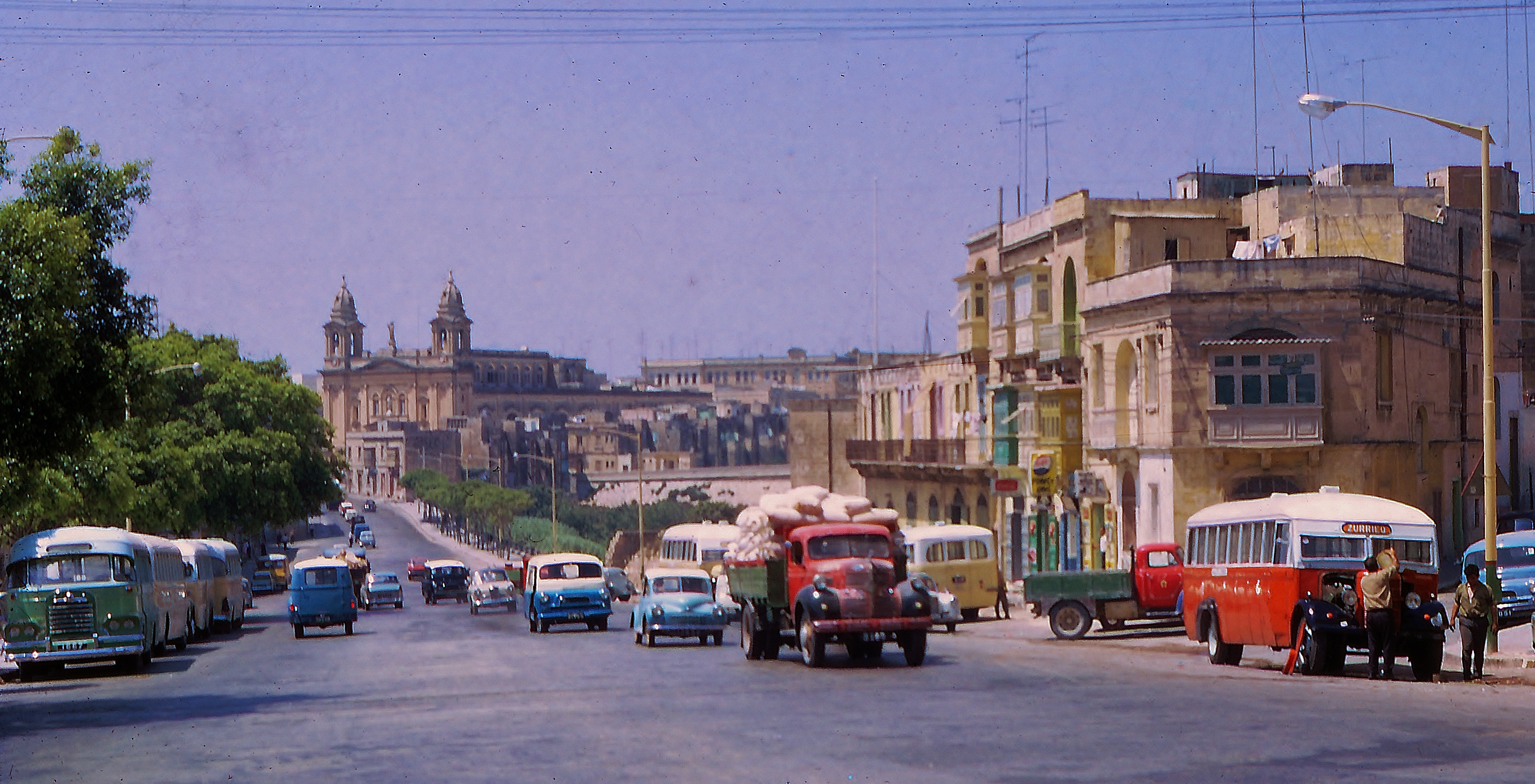
Marsa in 1967

In the 17th century a historical museum, the Museo di San Giacomo, was located at Marsa. This was created when Giovanni Francesco Abela converted his house into a museum and was the first of its type on Malta. Many of its artefacts are now held at the National Museum of Archaeology in Malta's capital city Valletta.

During the French blockade of 1798-1800, Maltese insurgents built Marsa Battery and Jesuit Hill Battery in Marsa to encircle the French in the Grand Harbour. Both batteries were demolished after the end of the blockade.

At the start of the British Colony of Malta, the marshes at Marsa were a source of malaria which had depopulated Paola and was felt up to Floriana. The drainage of the swamps in Corradino creek was one of the first aims of the colonial administration - partly realised by Captain Frederick Hunn, and partly by the local entrepreneur Francesco Zammit, to whom the colonial government gave property title on the all the land reclaimed. By the late 1830s, Zammit had thus become the richest man in Malta.

A new port was constructed in the 1860s under the rule of the British Empire. It was intended that a town would be built at the site under the name Albert Town, named after Prince Albert. By 1890 the town had a population of over 600 people, but it was later abandoned. A new town at the site emerged in the 20th century, taking the name Marsa after the creek.

In July 2009 a plan to regenerate the harbour area was announced. This is intended to turn the site into a recreational area and is planned include the construction of a marina with space for 170 boats. This was not taken forward.

The Maltese government branded Marsa as first local "city of culture" for the year 2022, with a programme of cultural activities aimed at revitalising the image of the locality.

== Facilities ==
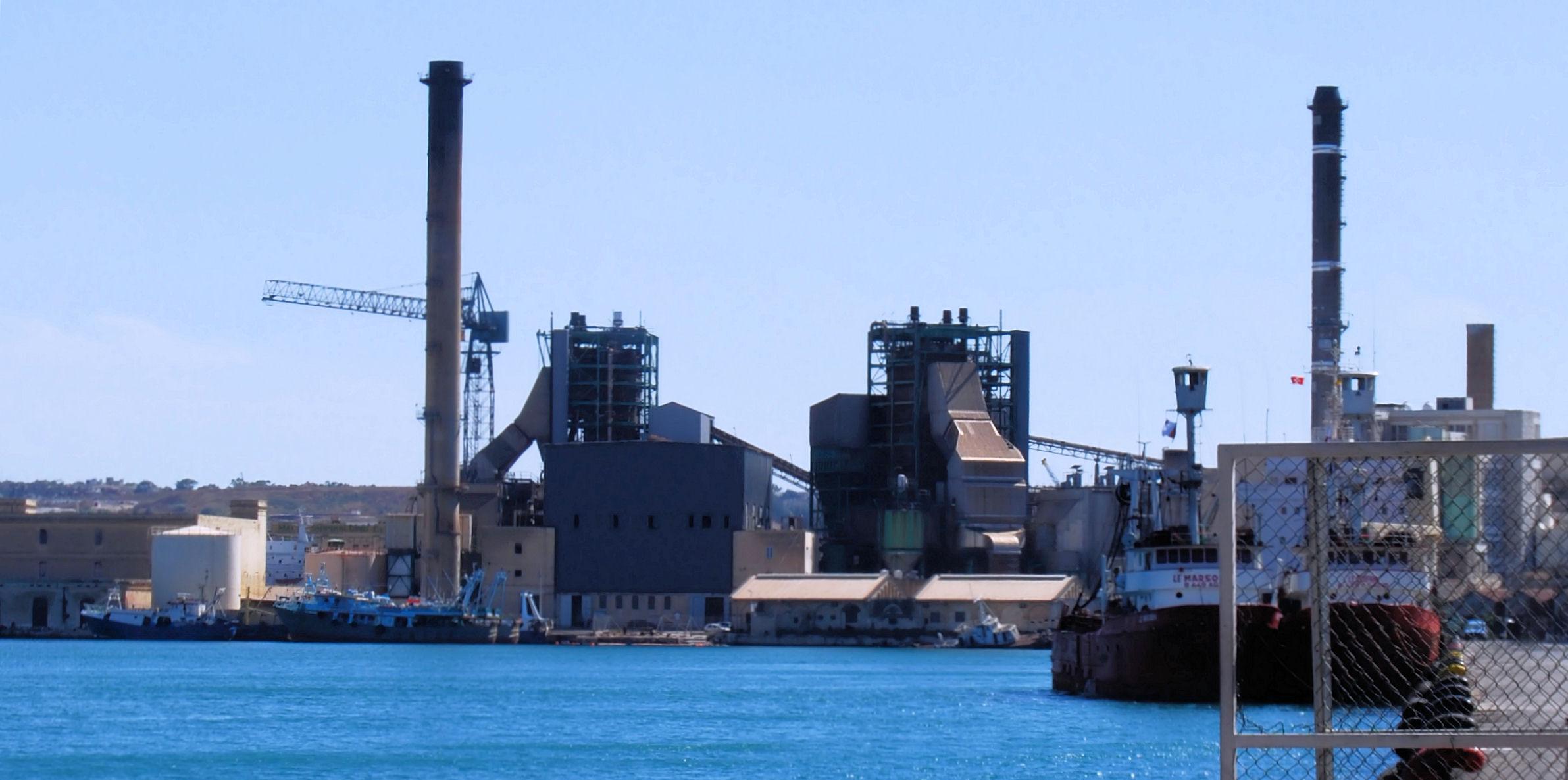
Marsa Power Station in 2009

Marsa is home to the Malta Shipyards. In November 2014, the Malta Shipbuilding in Marsa was also the venue for both the 12th annual Junior Eurovision Song Contest and the Malta Eurovision Song Contest 2015.

Since 1953, the oil-fueled Marsa Power Station provided most of the electricity to the Maltese Islands, until it began to be demolished in 2014. A new Marsa north distribution centre will be built instead of the former power station, in order to reinforce the island's power grid.

Marsa Race Track, a one-kilometre long horse racing track, was constructed in 1868 and remains in use.

Malta's postal administration MaltaPost has its head office in Qormi Road, Marsa. The General Post Office, Central Mail Room and Philatelic Bureau have been located in this complex since 1997.

Between 2006 and 2022, the former trade school in Marsa was used as an open centre accommodating migrants and asylum seekers.

== Zones in Marsa ==
- Albert Town

== Demographics and administration ==
The population of Marsa was 5,887 in July 2024. This included 3,416 males and 2,471 females; 3,969 Maltese nationals and 1,918 foreign nationals.

Historical population

Year	Pop.	±%
1901	?	—
1911	?	—
1921	4,836	—
1931	7,867	+62.7%

Year	Pop.	±%
1948	11,560	+46.9%
1957	10,672	−7.7%
1967	9,722	−8.9%
1985	7,953	−18.2%

Year	Pop.	±%
1995	5,324	−33.1%
2005	5,344	+0.4%
2011	4,788	−10.4%

Source: Census data

== Twin towns ==
Marsa is twinned with:

- Bridgwater, United Kingdom
- Auterive, France
