= Gasol =

Gasol is a surname in Spain. Notable people with the surname include:

- Pau Gasol (born 1980), Spanish basketball player
- Marc Gasol (born 1985), Spanish basketball player
