= Shanghai Electric =

Chinese multinational power generation and electrical equipment manufacturing company

Shanghai Electric Group Company Limited
- Native name: 上海电气集团股份有限公司
- Type: Public
- Traded as: SSE: 601727 (A share); SEHK: 2727 (H share)
- Industry: Engineering, capital goods
- Founded: 2004
- Headquarters: Shanghai, China
- Area served: Worldwide
- Key people: Huang Dinan (黄迪南) (Chairman & CEO)
- Products: List: Circuit breakers; Elevators; Environmental protection equipment; Industrial automation; Machine tools; Packaging and print machinery; Power generation equipment; Power transmission and distribution equipment; Switchgear; Transformers; Transport equipment

Chinese name
- Simplified Chinese: 上海电气集团股份有限公司
- Traditional Chinese: 上海電氣集團股份有限公司
Transcriptions
Standard Mandarin
- Hanyu Pinyin: Shànghǎi Diànqì Jítuán Gǔfèn Yǒuxiàn Gōngsī
- Website: www.shanghai-electric.com

Shanghai Electric (officially Shanghai Electric Group Company Limited) is a Chinese multinational power generation and electrical equipment manufacturing company headquartered in Shanghai. The company traces its roots to 1880.

Shanghai Electric is engaged in the design, manufacture and sale of products including power generation equipment, power transmission and distribution equipment, transformers, switchgear, circuit breakers, transport equipment, machine tools, elevators, packaging and print machinery, and environmental protection equipment.

It is the world's largest manufacturer of steam turbines. In 2020, Shanghai Electric ranked 81st in the Fortune China 500. In 2025, the company ranked 47th on World Brand Lab's "China's 500 Most Valuable Brands" List with Brand Value of US$31.8 Billion.

== History ==
Shanghai Electric has a long history and one of its subsidiaries was established before 1880. Shanghai Electric has achieved a number of breakthroughs since 1949, including the first 6,000 kW fossil-fueled power generating unit, the first cooling gas turbine generator in the world, the first ten-thousand water pressing machine in China, the first 300 MW nuclear power generating unit in China, the first large ship-use crankshaft in China, and the first 1,000 MW ultra super-critical fossil-fueled power generating units in China.

On April 28, 2005, Shanghai Electric listed on the Hong Kong Stock Exchange. On December 5, 2008, the group was listed on the Shanghai Stock Exchange.

In October 2010, Shanghai Electric and Reliance Power of India signed a US$8.3 billion agreement for Shanghai Electric to supply 36 coal-fired thermal power generation units to Reliance over the subsequent three years.

In April 2011 Shanghai Electric and Alstom agreed to combine their power plant boiler divisions into a new joint-venture company called Alstom-Shanghai Electric Boilers Co. In June 2011, Shanghai Electric announced plans to invest RMB 1 billion in a joint venture with Shanghai Municipal Electric Power Company, with each to hold a 50% stake.

In September 2011, Shanghai Electric signed a cooperation agreement with CESC to collaborate on the construction of coal-based power stations in India.

== Corporate affairs ==
Shanghai Electric has several A share listed subsidiaries, including Shanghai Mechanical & Electrical Industry co., Ltd., and has over 50 joint-ventures, including Shanghai Mitsubishi Elevator Co., Ltd., a joint venture with Mitsubishi Electric.

Shanghai Electric has a strategy to assist in the improvement of China's overall competitiveness through the achievement of three major objectives: "core business concentration, self-mastered innovation and global resource consolidation". The company also intends to develop its "Shanghai Electric" brand into a universal brand.

== Products ==
Shanghai Electric is engaged in the design, manufacture and sale of products including power generation equipment, wind turbines, power transmission and distribution equipment, transformers, switchgear, circuit breakers, transport equipment, machine tools, elevators, packaging and print machinery and environmental protection equipment. Shanghai Electric offers turnkey systems and service for power plants.

== Subsidiaries ==
Shanghai Electric Wind Energy Co., Ltd. is a wind turbine manufacturing company.

- In 2006 they bought the license to produce DeWind 1.25 megawatts (MW) D6 wind turbines.
- Since 2009 Shanghai Electric Wind is producing a 2MW wind turbine (development by aerodyn Energiesysteme GmbH)
- SEWIND developed a 3.6MW offshore turbine (2010)
- In 2009 Siemens and Shanghai Electric intend to set up two new joint ventures to form a strategic alliance for the Chinese wind power market.
- They developed a 5.0MW offshore turbine (2012)
