= Marsa Power Station =

Power station in Malta

Coordinates: 35°52′55″N 14°29′54″E

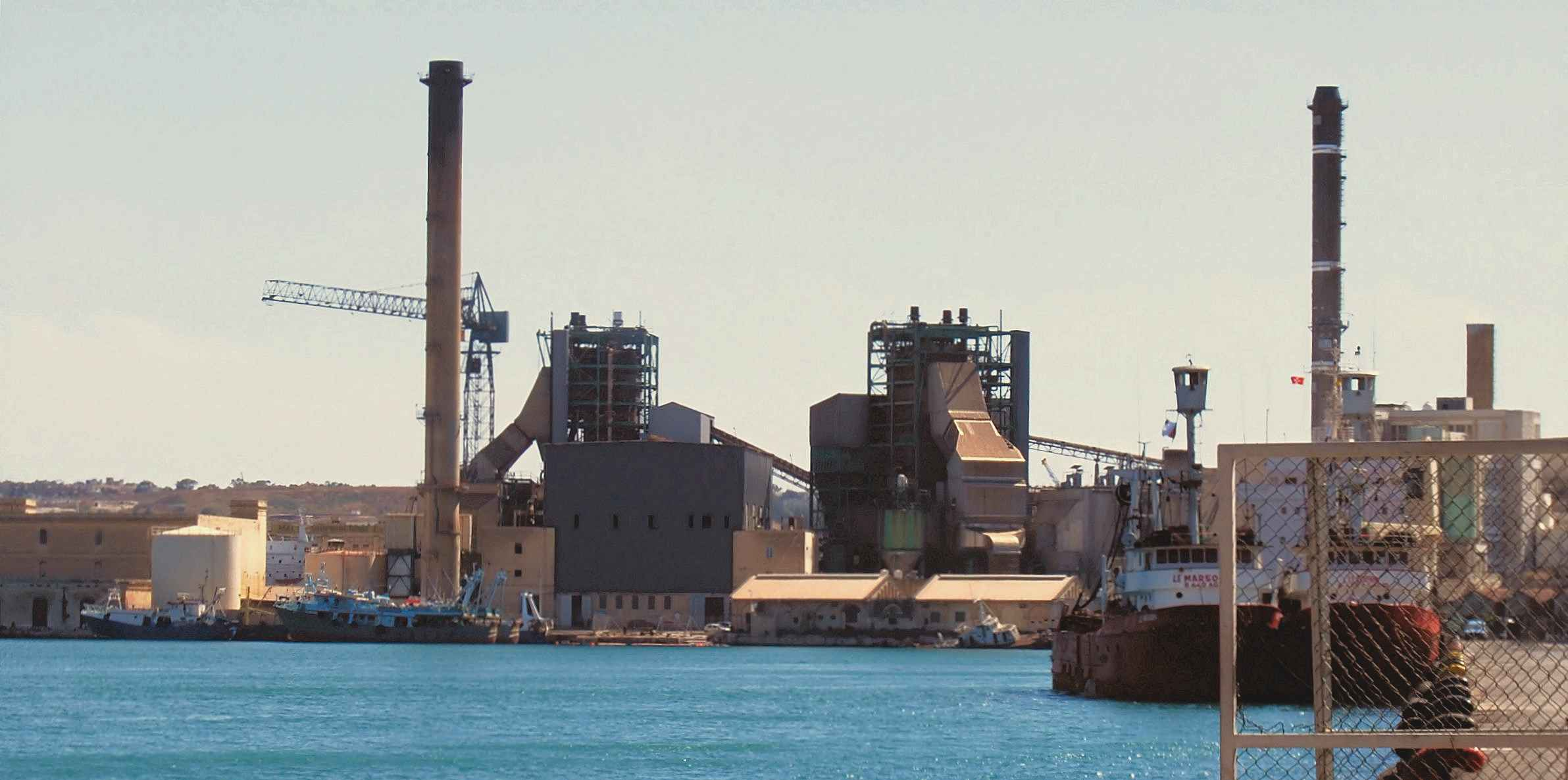
Marsa Power Station in 2009

The Marsa Power Station was a power generation plan in urban Malta, on the side of the Grand Harbour close to Marsa.

== Operation ==
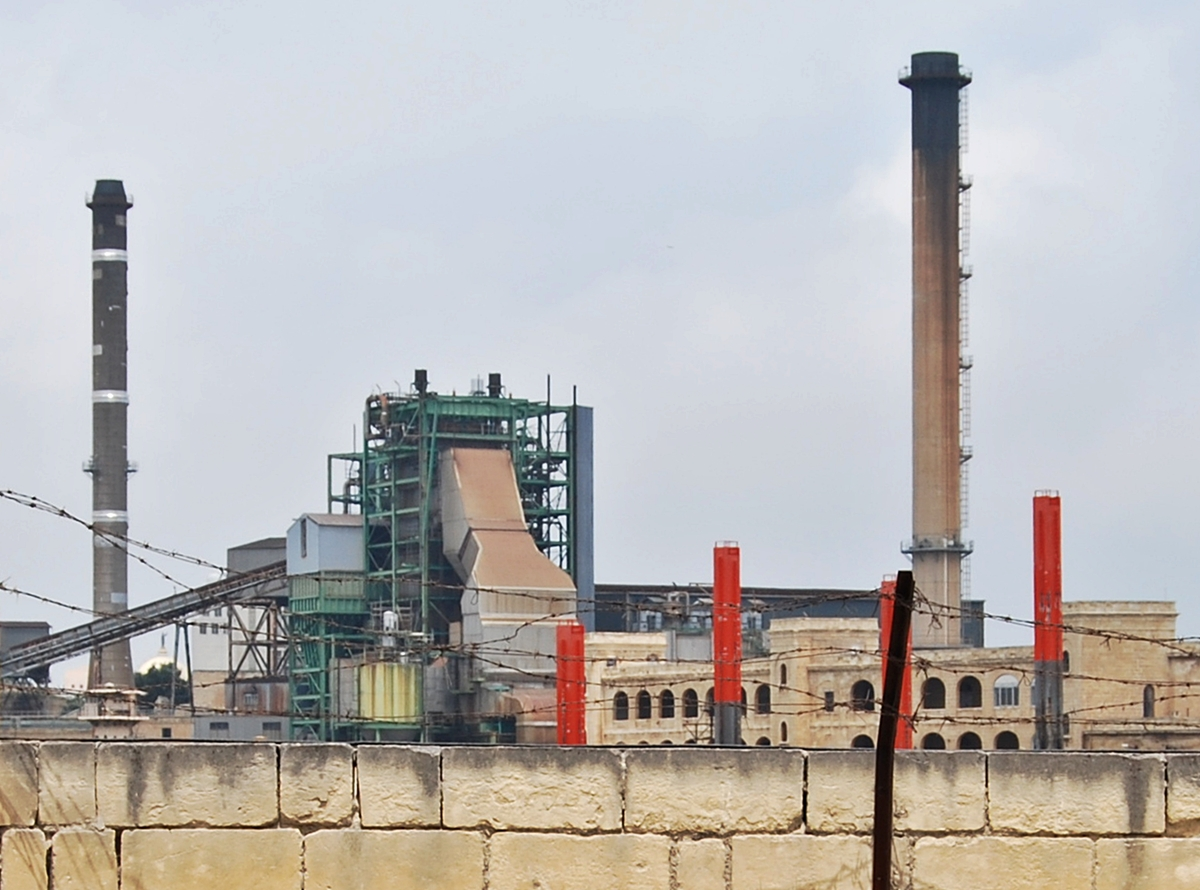
Marsa Power Station, seen from an industrial area of Paola

With the support of the Marshall Plan, Station A was built underground under Jesuit Hill and opened in 1953. The plant consisted of three units with an output of 5 MW. The plant was expanded due to the increasing demand for electricity. It finally had a total capacity of 30 MW, which was achieved by five steam units with 5 MW each and a gas turbine with a similar output. It was switched off in 1993. Station B went into operation in 1966 and has been expanded several times since then. The total capacity is 267 MW. All steam units burn heating oil with a sulfur content of 1% and the gas turbine also burns heating oil. The power plant is technically out of date. A turbine that is still in use was operated at Little Barford Power Station in England from 1954 to 1996.

== Shutdown ==
When the Delimara Power Station was planned, the government had promised to close the Marsa power plant, but this did not happen.

Enemalta wants to expand the Delimara power plant as a replacement for the Marsa power plant by mid 2012. It was switched off in March 2015 and continued in cold standby until early 2017; since then it has been disconnected from the mains. Enemalta plc contractors have completed the dismantling and demolition of the Marsa Power Station, paving the way for the long-awaited regeneration of this inner Grand Harbour area.

After the last two chimneys of the Marsa Power Station were pulled down, the few remaining structures on site, including one of the turbine halls and several fuel tanks, were removed to complete the project on schedule. The site has been cleared of all electricity generation equipment and buildings, down to ground level.

The dismantling and demolition of the 1953 Marsa Power Station included the gradual removal of the power station’s eight heavy fuel oil-fired units, and several other related structures, as soon as they were no longer required for electricity generation or as emergency capacity on cold standby. The dismantling process started in October 2014, a few months before the power station was switched off for the last time in March of the following year. Works on site gathered pace in the beginning of 2017, when the new Delimara 4 Power Station was commissioned and the last remaining Marsa Power Station units on cold standby were disconnected from the national grid.

The demolition contractors removed over 12,000 tonnes of concrete and other building materials from the power station site. Another 17,000 tonnes of metals, including steel, copper and aluminium, and 320 tonnes of electricity cables were exported for recycling. All materials were separated on site and carted away in adherence to strict waste management procedures. Dust abatement and other pollution control measures were in place to safeguard the wellbeing of residents and workers in the area during the entire process.

The oldest parts of the Marsa Power Station, known as the A Station, including several underground tunnels beneath Jesuits Hill, were retained.

A standalone diesel generator installed at the Marsa Power Station in 1990 for emergency is still on site next to other similar generators currently in use. The power station was shut down in 2017 but was brought back into use in 2020, due to series of power outages.

== Emissions ==
Before Malta joined the EU, due to the outdated technology, consideration was given to shutting down the plant. However, part of the electricity production was relocated to the more modern Delimara power plant, so that the EU limit values for emissions were reached. The fine dust emissions do not yet meet the EU standard. The total carbon dioxide emissions of the power plant in 2006 were 1,175,288 tons. The power plant has long been criticized by citizens in the area due to air pollution. The environmental organization Greenpeace saw in 1998 the power plant as the largest air polluter in Malta.
