= Protected areas of Malta =

There are over 300 protected areas in Malta which have a wide range of national and international protection statuses.

Photo	Name in Maltese	Name in English	Designation (Maltese)	Designation (English)	IUCN Category	Protected Planet ID and map
	Is-Simar	Is-Simar	Sit Ramsar, Art mistagħdra ta' Importanza Internazzjonali	Ramsar Site, Wetland of International Importance	Not Reported	
	L-Għadira	L-Għadira	Sit Ramsar, Art mistagħdra ta' Importanza Internazzjonali	Ramsar Site, Wetland of International Importance	Not Reported	
	Ta' Ċenċ (Sannat, Għawdex)	Ta' Ċenċ (Sannat, Gozo)	Sit ta' Importanza Xjentifika	Site of Scientific Importance	IV	
	Ċittadella	Cittadella	Żoni ta' Sbuħija Naturali	Area of High Landscape Value	V	
	L-Inħawi Tar-Ramla Tat-Torri U Tal-Irdum Tal-Madonna	Areas surroundsing Ramla tat-Torri and Irdum tal-Madonna	Żoni ta' Ħarsien Speċjali	Special Protection Areas	IV	
	L-Inħawi Tal-Għadira	Area surrounding L-Għadira	Żoni ta' Ħarsien Speċjali	Special Protection Areas	IV	
	Żona Fil-Baħar Fl-Inħawi Tal-Graben Tat-Tramuntana Ta’ Għawdex	Tal-Graben Marine Area, Northern Gozo	Żoni Speċjali ta' Konservazzjoni - Importanza Internazzjonali	Special Areas of Conservation - International Importance	IV	
	Il-Wied Ta' Rinella Fil-Kalkara	Rinella Valley, Kalkara	Żona ta' Importanza Ekoloġika	Area of Ecological Importance	IV	
	Għajn Tuffieħa, Limiti Ta' L-Imġarr	Għajn Tuffieħa, Limits of Mġarr	Żona ta' Importanza Ekoloġika	Area of Ecological Importance	IV	
	Wied Għollieqa	Wied Għollieqa (Nature Reserve)	Santwarju ta' l-Għasafar	Bird Sanctuary	IV	
	L-Inħawi Ta' L-Għadira		Żoni Speċjali ta' Konservazzjoni - Importanza Internazzjonali	Special Areas of Conservation - International Importance	IV	
	L-Inħawi Ta' Bloq / Wied Qirda	Area surrounding Wied Qirda / Ta' Bloq	Żoni Speċjali ta' Konservazzjoni - Importanza Nazzjonali	Special Areas of Conservation - National Importance	IV	
	L-Inħawi Ta' Ta' Ċenċ	Area surrounding Ta' Ċenc	Żoni Speċjali ta' Konservazzjoni - Importanza Internazzjonali	Special Areas of Conservation - International Importance	IV	
	Żona Fil-Baħar Fl-Inħawi Tad-Dwerja (Għawdex)	Marine area surrounding Dwejra (Gozo)	Żoni Speċjali ta' Konservazzjoni - Importanza Internazzjonali	Special Areas of Conservation - International Importance	IV	
	Il-Ballut Tal-Wardija (Limiti Ta' San Pawl Il-Baħar)	Wardija Oak Tree Protection Area (Limits of St. Paul's Bay)	Żona għall-Ħarsien tas-Siġar	Tree Protection Area	IV	
	Wied Il-Miżieb, Wied Tax-Xaqrani U L-Inħawi	Area surrounding Miżieb Valley and Tax-Xaqrani Valley	Żoni ta' Sbuħija Naturali	Area of High Landscape Value	V	
	Chadwick Lakes u Parti mill-Imdina	Chadwick Lakes and part of Mdina	Żoni ta' Sbuħija Naturali	Area of High Landscape Value	V	
	Rdumijiet Ta' Malta: Ix-Xaqqa Sa Wied Moqbol	Cliffs of Malta: Ix-Xaqqa to Wied Moqbol	Żoni ta' Ħarsien Speċjali	Special Protection Areas	IV	
	Il-Majjistral, Park Ta’ Natura u Storja	Majjistral Nature and History Park	Park Nazzjonali	National Park	II	
	Żona Fil-Baħar Fil-Punent	Western Marine Area	Żoni Speċjali ta' Konservazzjoni - Importanza Internazzjonali	Special Areas of Conservation - International Importance	IV	
	L-Inħawi Tal-Wej	Area surrounding Tal-Wej	Żoni Speċjali ta' Konservazzjoni - Importanza Internazzjonali	Special Areas of Conservation - International Importance	IV	
	L-Inħawi Tal-Inwadar	Area surrounding Tal-Inwadar	Żoni Speċjali ta' Konservazzjoni - Importanza Nazzjonali	Special Areas of Conservation - National Importance	IV	
	Wied Għollieqa		Żona ta' Importanza Ekoloġika/Sit ta' Importanza Xjentifika	Area of Ecological Importance/Site of Scientific Importance	IV	
	Żona Fil-Baħar Fl-Inħawi Tal-Majjistral Tal-Graben Ta’ Malta	Tal-Graben Marine Area, Northwestern Malta	Żoni Speċjali ta' Konservazzjoni - Importanza Internazzjonali	Special Areas of Conservation - International Importance	IV	
	Paper mulberry (Broussonetia Papyrifera) and Osage orange (Maclura Pomifera) at Addolorata Cemetery / Our Lady of Sorrows Cemetery (Limits of Marsa)	Area surrounding Addolorata Cemetery / Our Lady of Sorrows Cemetery	Santwarju ta' l-Għasafar	Bird Sanctuary	IV	
	Wied Għollieqa		Żona ta' Importanza Ekoloġika	Area of Ecological Importance	IV	
	Irdumijiet Ta' Madwar Il-Kosta Miċ-Ċirkewwa Sa Bengħisa	Coastal Cliffs from Ċirkewwa to Bengħisa	Żona ta' Importanza Ekoloġika	Area of Ecological Importance	IV	
	L-Inħawi Ta' Pembroke	Area surrounding Pembroke	Żoni Speċjali ta' Konservazzjoni - Importanza Internazzjonali	Special Areas of Conservation - International Importance	IV	
	L-Inħawi Tax-Xlendi - Wied Tal-Kantra	Area surrounding Xlendi and Wied Tal-Kantra	Żoni Speċjali ta' Konservazzjoni - Importanza Internazzjonali	Special Areas of Conservation - International Importance	IV	
	Għajn Barrani U L-Qortin Ta' Għajn Damma, Limiti Tax-Xagħra U Ż-Żebbuġ, Għawdex	Għajn Barrani and Qortin Ta' Għajn Damma, Limits of Xagħra and Żebbuġ, Gozo	Żona ta' Importanza Ekoloġika/Sit ta' Importanza Xjentifika	Area of Ecological Importance/Site of Scientific Importance	IV	
	Bur Salmastru, Xagħri, Masġar U Steppa Fis-Salini, Limiti Ta' San Pawl Il-Baħar U N-Naxxar	Salt marsh, garigue, grove and steppe in Salini, Limits of St. Paul's Bay and Naxxar	Żona ta' Importanza Ekoloġika/Sit ta' Importanza Xjentifika	Area of Ecological Importance/Site of Scientific Importance	IV	
	Tal-Wej, Limiti Tal-Mosta U N-Naxxar	Tal-Wej, Limits of Mosta and Naxxar	Żona ta' Importanza Ekoloġika/Sit ta' Importanza Xjentifika	Area of Ecological Importance/Site of Scientific Importance	IV	
	Diversi Rdumijiet	Several cliffs	Żoni ta' Sbuħija Naturali	Area of High Landscape Value	V	
	Rdumijiet Ta' Għawdex: Ta' Ċenċ	Cliffs of Gozo: Ta' Ċenċ	Żoni ta' Ħarsien Speċjali	Special Protection Areas	IV	
	L-Inħawi Tal-Buskett U Tal-Girgenti	Area surrounding Buskett Gardens and Girgenti	Żoni ta' Ħarsien Speċjali	Special Protection Areas	IV	
	Irdumijiet Ta' Madwar Il-Kosta Mill-Ponta Tal-Qrejten Sal-Qala Ta' San Ġorg F'Marsaxlokk/Birżebbuġa	Coastal Cliffs from Qrejten Point to St. George's Creek in Marsaxlokk/Birżebbuġa	Żona ta' Importanza Ekoloġika	Area of Ecological Importance	IV	
	Wied Għomor U Wied Il-Kbir, Limiti Ta' San Ġwann, San Ġiljan U S-Swieqi	Wied Għomor and Wied il-Kbir, Limits of San Ġwann, St. Julian's and Swieqi	Żona ta' Importanza Ekoloġika/Sit ta' Importanza Xjentifika	Area of Ecological Importance/Site of Scientific Importance	IV	
	L-Għolja Ta' Għammar, Għawdex	Għammar Hill, Gozo	Santwarju ta' l-Għasafar	Bird Sanctuary	IV	
	Il-Madwar Tal-Ġonna Tal-Buskett, U L-Palazz Ta' Verdala	Area surrounding Buskett Gardens and Verdala Palace	Santwarju ta' l-Għasafar	Bird Sanctuary	IV	
	Il-Ballut (L/Ta' Marsaxlokk)	Tal-Ballut (Limits of Marsaxlokk)	Żoni Speċjali ta' Konservazzjoni - Importanza Internazzjonali	Special Areas of Conservation - International Importance	IV	
	Il-Qortin Tal-Magun U L-Qortin Il-Kbir	Qortin tal-Magun and Qortin il-Kbir	Żoni Speċjali ta' Konservazzjoni - Importanza Internazzjonali	Special Areas of Conservation - International Importance	IV	
	Il-Magħluq, Limiti Ta' Marsaxlokk	Il-Magħluq, Limits of Marsaxlokk	Żona ta' Importanza Ekoloġika/Sit ta' Importanza Xjentifika	Area of Ecological Importance/Site of Scientific Importance	IV	
	Wied Għollieqa (Limiti Ta' San Ġwann U L-Imsida)	Wied Għollieqa (Limits of San Ġwann and Msida)	Żona għall-Ħarsien tas-Siġar	Tree Protection Area	IV	
	Wied Il-Miżieb	Il-Miżieb (Valley)	Żoni Speċjali ta' Konservazzjoni - Importanza Internazzjonali	Special Areas of Conservation - International Importance	IV	
	Il-Ballut Tal-Wardija (L/Ta' San Pawl Il-Baħar)	Wardija Oak Tree Special Area of Conservation (Limits of St. Paul's Bay)	Żoni Speċjali ta' Konservazzjoni - Importanza Internazzjonali	Special Areas of Conservation - International Importance	IV	
	Dwejra	Dwejra	Żoni ta' Sbuħija Naturali	Area of High Landscape Value	V	
	Rdumijiet Ta' Għawdex: Il-Ponta Ta' San Dimitri Sal-Ponta Ta' Ħarrux	Cliffs of Gozo: San Dimitri Point to Ħarrux Point	Żoni ta' Ħarsien Speċjali	Special Protection Areas	IV	
	Rdumijiet Ta' Malta: Ras Il-Pellegrin Sax-Xaqqa	Cliffs of Malta: Ras il-Pellegrin to Xaqqa	Żoni ta' Ħarsien Speċjali	Special Protection Areas	IV	
	Żona Fil-Baħar Fil-Majjistral	Northwestern Marine Area	Żoni ta' Ħarsien Speċjali	Special Protection Areas	IV	
	Il-Madwar Ta' Kennedy Grove U S-Salini	Area surrounding Kennedy Grove and Salini	Santwarju ta' l-Għasafar	Bird Sanctuary	IV	
	Ta' San Blas (Limiti Tar-Rabat And Ħaż-Żebbuġ)	San Blas (Limits of Rabat and Żebbuġ, Gozo)	Żona għall-Ħarsien tas-Siġar	Tree Protection Area	IV	
	Żona Fil-Baħar Fil-Lvant	Eastern Marine Area	Żoni ta' Ħarsien Speċjali	Special Protection Areas	IV	
	Il-Gżira Ta' Kemmuna	(Island of) Comino	Santwarju ta' l-Għasafar	Bird Sanctuary	IV	
	Victoria Lines	Victoria Lines	Żoni ta' Sbuħija Naturali	Area of High Landscape Value	V	
	Kemmuna, Kemmunett, Il-Ħaġriet Ta' Bejn Il-Kmiemen U L-Iskoll Ta' Taħt Il-Mazz	Comino, Cominotto, Surrounding Islets and Taħt il-Mazz Cove	Żoni ta' Ħarsien Speċjali	Special Protection Areas	IV	
	Żona Fil-Baħar Fil-Grigal	Northeastern Marine Area	Żoni ta' Ħarsien Speċjali	Special Protection Areas	IV	
	Il-Ground Ta' L-Isports Tal-Marsa	Marsa Sports Complex	Santwarju ta' l-Għasafar	Bird Sanctuary	Not Reported	
	L-Inħawi Tan-Nigret (Limiti Tan-Naxxar)	Area surrounding Nigret (Limits of Naxxar)	Żona għall-Ħarsien tas-Siġar	Tree Protection Area	IV	
	Wardija Ridge	Wardija Ridge	Żoni ta' Sbuħija Naturali	Area of High Landscape Value	V	
	Il-Qiegħ Tal-Wied Minn Ta' Blankas Sal-Bajja Ta' Mġarr Ix-Xini	Valley Floor from Ta' Blankas to Mġarr ix-Xini Bay	Żona ta' Importanza Ekoloġika/Sit ta' Importanza Xjentifika	Area of Ecological Importance/Site of Scientific Importance	IV	
	Il-Kumpless Ta' Qali	Ta' Qali Sports Complex	Santwarju ta' l-Għasafar	Bird Sanctuary	Not Reported	
	Manoel Island/Il-Gżira Ta' Forti Manwel	Manoel Island/Il-Gżira Ta' Forti Manwel	Santwarju ta' l-Għasafar	Bird Sanctuary	IV	
	Il-Madwar Tas-Simar, Fir-Ramla Tal-Pwales, San Pawl Il-Baħar	Area surrounding Is-Simar, Ramla tal-Pwales, St. Paul's Bay	Santwarju ta' l-Għasafar	Bird Sanctuary	IV	
	Il-Buskett	Buskett Gardens	Żona ta' Importanza Ekoloġika/Sit ta' Importanza Xjentifika	Area of Ecological Importance/Site of Scientific Importance	IV	
	Il-Madwar Tal-Bur Salmastru F' Tal-Ballut, Marsaxlokk	Area surrounding Salt Marsh at Tal-Ballut, Marsaxlokk	Santwarju ta' l-Għasafar	Bird Sanctuary	IV	
	Wied Il-Mielaħ U L-Inħawi Tal-Madwar	Wied il-Mielaħ and surrounding areas	Żoni ta' Ħarsien Speċjali	Special Protection Areas	IV	
	Ix-Xatt, Il-Wied U X-Xagħri Ġo R-Rifle Ranges Ta' Pembroke	Pembroke Rifles Ranges coast, valley and garigue	Żona ta' Importanza Ekoloġika/Sit ta' Importanza Xjentifika	Area of Ecological Importance/Site of Scientific Importance	IV	
	L-Inħawi Ta' L-Għadira Mill-Bajja Tal-Mellieħa Saċ-Ċumnija Fil-Mellieħa	Area surrounding L-Għadira from Mellieħa Bay to Iċ-Ċumnija, Mellieħa	Żona ta' Importanza Ekoloġika/Sit ta' Importanza Xjentifika	Area of Ecological Importance/Site of Scientific Importance	IV	
	Wied L-Imselliet, Tal-Ħżejjen, Ta' Għajn Mula, Ta' L-Arkata, Ta' Għajn Riħana, Ġebel Sarnu, Tat-Tarġa U Ta' Benniena	Wied l-Imselliet, Tal-Ħżejjen, Ta' Għajn Mula, Tal-Arkata, Ta' Għajn Riħana, Ġebel Sarnu, Tat-Tarġa and Ta' Benniena	Żona ta' Importanza Ekoloġika/Sit ta' Importanza Xjentifika	Area of Ecological Importance/Site of Scientific Importance	IV	
	Għajn Barrani (Limiti Tax-Xagħra)	Għajn Barrani (Limits of Xagħra)	Żona għall-Ħarsien tas-Siġar	Tree Protection Area	IV	
	Il-Baħar Ta' Madwar Filfla	Marine area surrounding Filfla	Żona Projbita	No Berthing Zone/No Entry Zone except for Fisheries	VI	
	Iċ-Ċimiterju Tal-Addolorata	Addolorata Cemetery / Our Lady of Sorrows Cemetery	Żona għall-Ħarsien tas-Siġar	Tree Protection Area	IV	
	Kemmunett, Limiti Ta' Għajnsielem	Cominotto, Limits of Għajnsielem	Żona ta' Importanza Ekoloġika/Sit ta' Importanza Xjentifika	Area of Ecological Importance/Site of Scientific Importance	IV	
	Ix-Xagħra Tal-Kortin	Ix-Xagħra Tal-Kortin	Żoni Speċjali ta' Konservazzjoni - Importanza Internazzjonali	Special Areas of Conservation - International Importance	IV	
	Żona Fil-Baħar Bejn Il-Ponta Ta’ San Dimitri (Għawdex) U Il-Qaliet	Marine Area between San Dimitri Point (Gozo) and Qaliet	Żoni Speċjali ta' Konservazzjoni - Importanza Internazzjonali	Special Areas of Conservation - International Importance	IV	
	Ta' Bloq - Għar Ħanżir (Limiti Ta' Ħal Qormi U S-Siġġiewi)	Ta' Bloq - Għar Ħanżir (Limits of Qormi and Siġġiewi)	Żona għall-Ħarsien tas-Siġar	Tree Protection Area	IV	
	Wied Ix-Xlendi	Wied ix-Xlendi	Żoni ta' Sbuħija Naturali	Area of High Landscape Value	V	
	Żona Fil-Baħar Madwar Għawdex	Marine Area surrounding Gozo	Żoni ta' Ħarsien Speċjali	Special Protection Areas	IV	
	Il-Madwar Ta' L-Għadira, Fil-Bajja Tal-Mellieħa	Area surrounding L-Għadira, Mellieħa Bay	Santwarju ta' l-Għasafar	Bird Sanctuary	IV	
	Wied Il-Mielaħ U L-Inħawi Tal-Madwar		Żoni Speċjali ta' Konservazzjoni - Importanza Internazzjonali	Special Areas of Conservation - International Importance	IV	
	Żona Fil-Baħar Fix-Xlokk	Southeastern Marine Area	Żoni ta' Ħarsien Speċjali	Special Protection Areas	IV	
	L-Inħawi Tal-Buskett - Girgenti		Żoni Speċjali ta' Konservazzjoni - Importanza Internazzjonali	Special Areas of Conservation - International Importance	IV	
	Rdumijiet Ta' Malta	Cliffs of Malta	Żoni Speċjali ta' Konservazzjoni - Importanza Internazzjonali	Special Areas of Conservation - International Importance	IV	
	L-Inħawi Tad-Dwejra - Qawra, Inkluż Ħaġret Il-Ġeneral	Area surrounding Dwejra, Qawra, including Fungus Rock	Żoni Speċjali ta' Konservazzjoni - Importanza Internazzjonali	Special Areas of Conservation - International Importance	IV	
	Żona Fil-Baħar Bejn Rdum Majjiesa U Għar Lapsi	Marine Area from Majjiesa Cliff to Għar Lapsi	Żoni Speċjali ta' Konservazzjoni - Importanza Internazzjonali	Special Areas of Conservation - International Importance	IV	
	L-Inħawi Tas-Simar Mit-Triq Tal-Miżieb Sa Xatt Il-Pwales, Limiti Ta' San Pawl Il-Baħar	Area surrounding Is-Simar from Il-Miżieb to Xatt il-Pwales, Limits of St. Paul's Bay	Żona ta' Importanza Ekoloġika/Sit ta' Importanza Xjentifika	Area of Ecological Importance/Site of Scientific Importance	IV	
	Wied Żembaq (Limiti Ta' Birżebbuġa)	Wied Żembaq (Limits of Birżebbuġa)	Żona għall-Ħarsien tas-Siġar	Tree Protection Area	IV	
	Mdina	Mdina	Żoni ta' Sbuħija Naturali	Area of High Landscape Value	V	
	Żona Fil-Baħar Fl-Inħawi Tal-Punent Tal-Graben Ta’ Malta	Tal-Graben Marine Area, Western Malta	Żoni Speċjali ta' Konservazzjoni - Importanza Internazzjonali	Special Areas of Conservation - International Importance	IV	
	Irdumijiet Ta' Madwar Il-Kosta Mill-Ponta Ta' L-Aħrax Sa Rdum Il-Ħmar Fil-Mellieħa	Coastal cliffs from Tal-Aħrax Point to Rdum il-Ħmar, Mellieħa	Żona ta' Importanza Ekoloġika	Area of Ecological Importance	IV	
	L-Inħawi Tar-Ramla Tat-Torri / Rdum Tal-Madonna		Żoni Speċjali ta' Konservazzjoni - Importanza Internazzjonali	Special Areas of Conservation - International Importance	IV	
	Wied Il-Miżieb, Wied Tax-Xaqrani U L-Inħawi Tal-Madwar, Limiti Tal-Mellieħa)		Żona ta' Importanza Ekoloġika/Sit ta' Importanza Xjentifika	Area of Ecological Importance/Site of Scientific Importance	IV	
	Fortifikazzjonijiet Tal-Port	Harbour fortifications	Żoni ta' Sbuħija Naturali	Area of High Landscape Value	V	
	Is-Simar (Limiti Ta' San Pawl Il-Bahar)	Is-Simar (Limits of St. Paul's Bay)	Żoni ta' Ħarsien Speċjali	Special Protection Areas	IV	
	Rdumijiet Ta' Għawdex: Id-Dawra Tas-Sanap Sa Tal-Ħajt	Cliffs of Gozo: Dawra tas-Sanap to Tal-Ħajt	Żoni ta' Ħarsien Speċjali	Special Protection Areas	IV	
	Żona Fil-Baħar Fl-Inħawi Tal-Graben Ta’ Medina	Marine Area surrounding Tal-Graben ta' Medina	Żoni Speċjali ta' Konservazzjoni - Importanza Internazzjonali	Special Areas of Conservation - International Importance	IV	
	Wied Il-Baħrija/Wied Rini U Wied Gerżuma, Limiti Tar- Rabat	Wied Il-Baħrija/Wied Rini and Wied Gerżuma, Limits of Rabat, Malta	Żona ta' Importanza Ekoloġika/Sit ta' Importanza Xjentifika	Area of Ecological Importance/Site of Scientific Importance	IV	
	L-Inħawi Ta' Portes-Des-Bombes	Area surrounding Portes des Bombes	Santwarju ta' l-Għasafar	Bird Sanctuary	Not Reported	
	L-Inħawi T'Għajn Barrani		Żoni Speċjali ta' Konservazzjoni - Importanza Internazzjonali	Special Areas of Conservation - International Importance	IV	
	Il-Qortin Isopu, Il-Qortin Tal-Magun U L-Qortin Il-Kbira (Nadur, Għawdex)	Il-Qortin Isopu, Il-Qortin Tal-Magun and Il-Qortin Il-Kbira (Nadur, Gozo)	Żona ta' Importanza Ekoloġika/Sit ta' Importanza Xjentifika	Area of Ecological Importance/Site of Scientific Importance	IV	
	L-Għar Tal-Iburdan U L-Inħawi Tal-Madwar	Għar tal-Iburdan and surrounding area	Żoni Speċjali ta' Konservazzjoni - Importanza Internazzjonali	Special Areas of Conservation - International Importance	IV	
	Rdumijiet Ta' Għawdex: Il-Ponta Ta' Ħarrux Sal-Bajja Tax-Xlendi	Cliffs of Gozo: Ħarrux Point to Xlendi Bay	Żoni ta' Ħarsien Speċjali	Special Protection Areas	IV	
	L-Inħawi Tan-Nuffara - In-Nuffara, Daħla Tan-Nuffara, Tan-Nuffara	Area surrounding In-Nuffara - In-Nuffara, Daħla Tan-Nuffara, Tan-Nuffara	Żoni Speċjali ta' Konservazzjoni - Importanza Nazzjonali	Special Areas of Conservation - National Importance	IV	
	Żona Fil-Baħar Bejn Il-Ponta Tal-Ħotba U Tal-Fessej (Għawdex)	Marine Area from Tal-Ħotba Point to Tal-Fessej (Gozo)	Żoni Speċjali ta' Konservazzjoni - Importanza Internazzjonali	Special Areas of Conservation - International Importance	IV	
	Id-Dwejra U L-Qawra, Limiti Ta' San Lawrenz U Kerċem, Għawdex	Dwejra and Qawra, Limits of San Lawrenz and Kerċem, Gozo	Żona ta' Importanza Ekoloġika/Sit ta' Importanza Xjentifika	Area of Ecological Importance/Site of Scientific Importance	IV	
	Għajn Barrani		Żoni ta' Sbuħija Naturali	Area of High Landscape Value	V	
	Żona Fil-Baħar Fit-Tramuntana	Northern Marine Area	Żoni ta' Ħarsien Speċjali	Special Protection Areas	IV	
	Żona Fil-Baħar Fin-Nofsinhar	Southern Marine Area	Żoni ta' Ħarsien Speċjali	Special Protection Areas	IV	
	Żona Fil-Baħar Fil-Lbiċ	Southwestern Marine Area	Żoni ta' Ħarsien Speċjali	Special Protection Areas	IV	
	L-Ajruport Ta' Ħal-Luqa	Luqa Airport	Santwarju ta' l-Għasafar	Bird Sanctuary	Not Reported	
	Is-Salini	Is-Salini	Żoni Speċjali ta' Konservazzjoni - Importanza Internazzjonali	Special Areas of Conservation - International Importance	IV	
	Kemmuna, Kemmunett, Il-Ħaġriet Ta' Bejn Il-Kmiemen U L-Iskoll Ta' Taħt Il-Mazz		Żoni Speċjali ta' Konservazzjoni - Importanza Internazzjonali	Special Areas of Conservation - International Importance	IV	
	L-Inħawi Ta' L-Imġiebaħ / Tal-Miġnuna	Area surrounding L-Imġiebaħ / Tal-Miġnuna	Żoni Speċjali ta' Konservazzjoni - Importanza Internazzjonali	Special Areas of Conservation - International Importance	IV	
	Ġnien Il-Kbir, Il-Buskett U Wied Il-Girgenti	Ġnien il-Kbir, Buskett Gardens and Wied il-Girgenti	Żona għall-Ħarsien tas-Siġar	Tree Protection Area	IV	
	L-Inħawi Ta' Wied Il-Miżieb (Limiti Tal-Mellieħa)		Żona għall-Ħarsien tas-Siġar	Tree Protection Area	IV	
	Is-Saqqajja	Is-Saqqajja	Żoni ta' Sbuħija Naturali	Area of High Landscape Value	V	
	Rdumijiet Ta' Malta: Wied Moqbol Sal-Ponta Ta' Bengħisa	Cliffs of Malta: Wied Moqbol ta' Bengħisa Point	Żoni ta' Ħarsien Speċjali	Special Protection Areas	IV	
	Il-Qawra, Għawdex	Qawra, Gozo	Santwarju ta' l-Għasafar	Bird Sanctuary	IV	
	Is-Simar (L/Ta' San Pawl Il-Baħar)		Żoni Speċjali ta' Konservazzjoni - Importanza Internazzjonali	Special Areas of Conservation - International Importance	IV	
	Wied Għollieqa (L/Ta' San Ġwann)		Żoni Speċjali ta' Konservazzjoni - Importanza Nazzjonali	Special Areas of Conservation - National Importance	IV	
	Sistema Ta' Widien Tas-Salina, Minn Wied Liemu Sa Wied Taċ-Ċawsli	Salina Valley System, from Wied Liemu to Wied taċ-Ċawsli	Żona ta' Importanza Ekoloġika/Sit ta' Importanza Xjentifika	Area of Ecological Importance/Site of Scientific Importance	IV	
	Wardija Ridge, Il-Ballut Tal-Wardija, Il-Wied Ta' San Martin, U L-Inħawi Tal-Madwar	Wardija Ridge, Il-Ballut tal-Wardija, Wied ta' San Martin, and surrounding area	Żona ta' Importanza Ekoloġika/Sit ta' Importanza Xjentifika	Area of Ecological Importance/Site of Scientific Importance	IV	
	Żona Fil-Baħar Fl-Inħawi Ta' Għar Lapsi U Ta' Filfla	Marine Area surrounding Għar Lapsi and Filfla	Żoni Speċjali ta' Konservazzjoni - Importanza Internazzjonali	Special Areas of Conservation - International Importance	IV	
	Wied Il-Għasel	Wied Il-Għasel	Żoni ta' Sbuħija Naturali	Area of High Landscape Value	V	
	Irdumijiet Ta' Madwar Il-Kosta Mid-Daħla Ta' San Tumas Sas-Sarċ	Coastal Cliffs from St. Thomas' Bay to Is-Sarċ	Żona ta' Importanza Ekoloġika	Area of Ecological Importance	IV	
	L-Inħawi Fuq L-Għoljiet Ta' Ċenċ, Għawdex	Area surrounding Ta' Ċenċ, Gozo	Santwarju ta' l-Għasafar	Bird Sanctuary	IV	
	Irdumijiet Ta' Madwar Il-Kosta Mill-Irdum Tal-Griebeġ Sa Il-Qala Tal-Mistra Fil-Mellieħa/San Pawl Il-Baħar	Coastal Cliffs from Tal-Griebeġ Cliff to Mistra Bay, Mellieħa/St. Paul's Bay	Żona ta' Importanza Ekoloġika	Area of Ecological Importance	IV	
	Il-Girgenti	Il-Girgenti	Santwarju ta' l-Għasafar	Bird Sanctuary	IV	
	Irdumijiet Ta' Madwar Il-Kosta Minn Tal-Blata Sal-Qala Tal-Għażżenin	Coastal Cliffs from Tal-Blata to Qala Tal-Għażżenin	Żona ta' Importanza Ekoloġika	Area of Ecological Importance	IV	
	Wied Ix-Xlendi, Wied Il-Lunzjata U L-Inħawi Tagħhom, Fil-Limiti Ta' Kerċem, Il-Munxar, Fontana U R-Rabat (Għawdex)	Wied Ix-Xlendi, Wied il-Lunzjata and surrounding area, Limits of Kerċem, Munxar, Fontana and Rabat (Gozo)	Żona ta' Importanza Ekoloġika/Sit ta' Importanza Xjentifika	Area of Ecological Importance/Site of Scientific Importance	IV	
	L-Olivastru (Phillyrea Latifolia) F’San Martin (Limiti Ta' San Pawl Il-Baħar)	Mock Privet/Jasmine Box (Phillyrea Latifolia) at San Martin (Limits of St. Paul's Bay)	Żona għall-Ħarsien tas-Siġar	Tree Protection Area	IV	
	L-Inħawi Tal-Wej		Żoni Speċjali ta' Konservazzjoni - Importanza Nazzjonali	Special Areas of Conservation - National Importance	IV	
	Il-Buskett		Żoni ta' Sbuħija Naturali	Area of High Landscape Value	V	
	Il-Ġebla Tal-Għallis, Limiti Tan-Naxxar	Għallis Rock(s), Limits of Naxxar	Sit ta' Importanza Xjentifika	Site of Scientific Importance	IV	
	Il-Ħnejja, Limiti Tal-Qala	Il-Ħnejja, Limits of Qala	Sit ta' Importanza Xjentifika	Site of Scientific Importance	IV	
	Il-Ġebla L-Ħalfa, Limiti Tal-Qala	Ġebla l-Ħalfa, Limits of Qala	Żona ta' Importanza Ekoloġika/Sit ta' Importanza Xjentifika	Area of Ecological Importance/Site of Scientific Importance	IV	
	Wied Moqbol (Limiti Taż-Żurrieq)	Wied Moqbol (Limits of Żurrieq)	Żona għall-Ħarsien tas-Siġar	Tree Protection Area	IV	
	Il-Bajja Tax-Xlendi	Xlendi Bay	Xtajtiet Protetti	Protected Beaches	Not Reported	
	L-Għar Ta' Calypso, Ix-Xagħra	Calypso Cave, Xagħra	Żona ta' Importanza Ekoloġika/Sit ta' Importanza Xjentifika	Area of Ecological Importance/Site of Scientific Importance	IV	
	L-Ulmu Ingliż (Ulmus Procera) F'Wied Għajn Mula (Limiti Ta' Burmarrad)	English elm (Ulmus Procera) in Wied Għajn Mula (Limits of Burmarrad)	Żona għall-Ħarsien tas-Siġar	Tree Protection Area	IV	
	L-Olivastru (Phillyrea Latifolia) Fil-Buskett (Limiti Tar-Rabat)	Mock Privet/Jasmine Box (Phillyrea Latifolia) at Buskett Gardens (Limits of Rabat, Malta)	Żona għall-Ħarsien tas-Siġar	Tree Protection Area	IV	
	Il-Ħarruba (Ceratonia Siliqua) Fl-Inħawi Tax-Xemxija (Limiti Ta’ San Pawl Il-Baħar)	Carob (Ceratonia Siliqua) at the Area surrounding Xemxija (Limits of St. Paul's Bay)	Żona għall-Ħarsien tas-Siġar	Tree Protection Area	IV	
	Ġummara (Chamaerops Humilis) Fi Triq Skapuċċina (Limiti Taż-Żebbuġ)	Dwarf Fan Palm (Chamaerops Humilis) at Skapuċċina Road (Limits of Żebbuġ, Gozo)	Żona għall-Ħarsien tas-Siġar	Tree Protection Area	IV	
	L-Inħawi Ta' Ħas-Saptan	Area surrounding Ħas-Saptan	Żoni Speċjali ta' Konservazzjoni - Importanza Internazzjonali	Special Areas of Conservation - International Importance	IV	
	Bur Salmastru Fil-Magħluq (L/Ta' Wied Il-Għajn)	Salt marsh at Il-Magħluq (Limits of Marsaskala)	Żona ta' Importanza Ekoloġika/Sit ta' Importanza Xjentifika	Area of Ecological Importance/Site of Scientific Importance	IV	
	Masġar Ta’ Żebbuġ Antik (Olea Europaea) F’Wied Ħal Lija (Limiti Ta’ Ħal Lija)	Old Olive (Olea Europaea) Grove at Wied Ħal Lija (Limits of Ħal Lija)	Żona għall-Ħarsien tas-Siġar	Tree Protection Area	IV	
	Difla (Nerium Oleander) F’Ħarq Il-Ħammiem (Limiti Ta' Pembroke)	Oleander/Rose Bay (Nerium Oleander) at Ħarq il-Ħamiem (Limits of Pembroke)	Żona għall-Ħarsien tas-Siġar	Tree Protection Area	IV	
	Il-Ġenisti S-Sofor (Spartium Junceum) Fil-Palazz Tal-Inkwiżitur (Limiti Tas-Siġġiewi)	Spanish Broom/Weaver's Broom (Spartium Junceum) at Inquisitor's Palace (Limits of Siġġiewi)	Żona għall-Ħarsien tas-Siġar	Tree Protection Area	IV	
	Masġar Tar-Rand (Laurus Nobilis) F’Wied Is-Sir (Limiti Tal-Mosta)	Bay Laurel (Laurus Nobilis) Grove at Wied is-Sir (Limits of Mosta)	Żona għall-Ħarsien tas-Siġar	Tree Protection Area	IV	
	Il-Ġenista L-Bajda (Retama Monosperma) Fl-Inħawi Tal-Verdala (Limiti Tar-Rabat)	Bridal (Veil) Broom (Retama Monosperma) at the area surrounding Verdala (Limits of Rabat, Malta)	Żona għall-Ħarsien tas-Siġar	Tree Protection Area	IV	
	Żebbuġa (Olea Europaea) U Ħarrub (Ceratonia Siliqua) F’Tas-Santi, Binġemma (Limiti Tar-Rabat)	Olive (Olea Europaea) and Carob (Ceratonia Siliqua) at Tas-Santi, Binġemma (Limits of Rabat, Malta)	Żona għall-Ħarsien tas-Siġar	Tree Protection Area	IV	
	Masġar Tal-Luq (Populus Alba) Wied Sara (Limiti Tar-Rabat)	White Poplar (Populus Alba) Grove at Wied Sara (Limits of Rabat, Gozo)	Żona għall-Ħarsien tas-Siġar	Tree Protection Area	IV	
	Il-Maklura (Maclura Pomifera) Fil-Ġonna Ta’ Spencer (Limiti Tal-Marsa)	Osage Orange (Maclura Pomifera) at Spencer Gardens (Limits of Marsa)	Żona għall-Ħarsien tas-Siġar	Tree Protection Area	IV	
	Luq (Populus Alba) F'Wied Tal-Lunzjata (Limiti F'Ta' Kerċem)	White Poplar (Populus Alba) at Wied Tal-Lunzjata (Limits of Kerċem)	Żona għall-Ħarsien tas-Siġar	Tree Protection Area	IV	
	Bur Salmastru Fil-Ħofra (L/Tal-Mellieħa)	Salt Marsh at Il-Ħofra (Limits of Mellieħa)	Żona ta' Importanza Ekoloġika	Area of Ecological Importance	IV	
	It-Taqtiegħa U T-Taqtiegħa Ta' Delimara, Limiti Ta' Marsaxlokk	It-Taqtiegħa and It-Taqtiegħa ta' Delimara, Limits of Marsaxlokk	Sit ta' Importanza Xjentifika	Site of Scientific Importance	IV	
	Il-Bajja Taċ-Ċagħaq Ta' Kemmunett	Pebbly Beach at Cominotto	Sit ta' Importanza Xjentifika	Site of Scientific Importance	IV	
	Il-Wied Ta' L-Imġiebaħ, Mellieħa (Ballut Antik)	Wied tal-Imġiebaħ, Mellieħa (Old Oak trees)	List of Historical Trees Having an Antiquarian Importance	List of Historical Trees Having an Antiquarian Importance	III	
	Il-Ġonna Tal-Mall, Floriana (Siġar Antiki)	The Mall, Floriana (Old Trees)	List of Historical Trees Having an Antiquarian Importance	List of Historical Trees Having an Antiquarian Importance	III	
	Il-Bajja Ta' L-Armier	Armier Bay	Xtajtiet Protetti	Protected Beaches	Not Reported	
	L-Għadira Ta' Sarraflu (L/Tal-Kerċem)	Ta' Sarraflu Pond (Limits of Kerċem)	Żoni Speċjali ta' Konservazzjoni - Importanza Nazzjonali	Special Areas of Conservation - National Importance	IV	
	Wied Qirda (Limiti Tas-Siġġiewi)	Wied Qirda (Limits of Siġġiewi)	Żona għall-Ħarsien tas-Siġar	Tree Protection Area	IV	
	Triq Il-Wied Tal-Imsida	Valley Road, Msida	Żona għall-Ħarsien tas-Siġar	Tree Protection Area	IV	
	Il-Magħluq Tal-Baħar (L/Ta' Marsascala)	Il-Magħluq tal-Baħar (Limits of Marsaskala)	Żoni Speċjali ta' Konservazzjoni - Importanza Internazzjonali	Special Areas of Conservation - International Importance	IV	
	Ir-Ramla Taċ-Ċirkewwa	Ramla taċ-Ċirkewwa	Xtajtiet Protetti	Protected Beaches	Not Reported	
	Wied Ir-Rum (Limiti Tar-Rabat)	Wied ir-Rum (Limits of Rabat, Malta)	Żona għall-Ħarsien tas-Siġar	Tree Protection Area	IV	
	Il-Fekruna (Wied Tax-Xlendi), L/Ta' Munxar, Għawdex	Il-Fekruna (Wied tax-Xlendi), Limits of Munxar, Gozo	Sit ta' Importanza Xjentifika	Site of Scientific Importance	IV	
	Parti Minn Wied Musa, Limiti Tal-Mellieħa	Part of Wied Musa, Limits of Mellieħa	Sit ta' Importanza Xjentifika	Site of Scientific Importance	IV	
	Bur Salmastru Fir-Ramla Tal-Bir (L/Tal-Mellieħa)	Salt Marsh at Ramla tal-Bir (Limits of Mellieħa)	Żona ta' Importanza Ekoloġika	Area of Ecological Importance	IV	
	Għaram Tar-Ramel Fir-Ramla Tal-Mixquqa, Il-Mellieħa	Sand Dunes at Ramla tal-Mixquqa, Mellieħa	Żona ta' Importanza Ekoloġika	Area of Ecological Importance	IV	
	Wied Binġemma (Limiti Tan-Nadur)	Wied Binġemma (Limits of Nadur)	Żona għall-Ħarsien tas-Siġar	Tree Protection Area	IV	
	Siġra Tal-Għadib (Vitex Agnus-Castus) F'Wied Il-Pergla (Limiti Tax-Xagħra)	Chaste Tree (Vitex Agnus-Castus) at Wied il-Pergla (Limits of Xagħra)	Żona għall-Ħarsien tas-Siġar	Tree Protection Area	IV	
	Għaram Tar-Ramel Fl-Armier, Limiti Tal-Mellieħa	Sand Dunes at Armier, Limits of Mellieħa	Żona ta' Importanza Ekoloġika/Sit ta' Importanza Xjentifika	Area of Ecological Importance/Site of Scientific Importance	IV	
	Il-Wied Tal-Kalkara Fil-Kalkara	Wied tal-Kalkara, Kalkara	Żona ta' Importanza Ekoloġika	Area of Ecological Importance	IV	
	Għadajjar Ta' L-Ilma Ħelu Fil-Qattara, Dwejra (L/Ta' San Lawrenz, Għawdex)	Freshwater Pools at Qattara (Limits of San Lawrenz, Gozo)	Żona ta' Importanza Ekoloġika/Sit ta' Importanza Xjentifika	Area of Ecological Importance/Site of Scientific Importance	IV	
	Il-Gżira Ta' Filfla	Island of Filfla	Santwarju ta' l-Għasafar	Bird Sanctuary	IV	
	Il-Ballut Tal-Wardija (Ballut Antik)	Il-Ballut tal-Wardija (Old Oak trees)	List of Historical Trees Having an Antiquarian Importance	List of Historical Trees Having an Antiquarian Importance	III	
	Il-Gżejjer Selmunett (Gżejjer Ta' San Pawl)	Selmun Islands (St. Paul's Islands)	Riserva Naturali (Gżejjer)	Nature Reserve (Islands)	Ia	
	L-Istazzjoni Tal-Vor, It-Tafal, Fil-Limiti Ta' Kerċem, Għawdex	L-Istazzjoni tal-Vor, It-Tafal, Limits of Kerċem, Gozo	Santwarju ta' l-Għasafar	Bird Sanctuary	Not Reported	
	Il-Qattara (Limiti Ta' San Lawrenz)	Qattara (Limits of San Lawrenz)	Żona għall-Ħarsien tas-Siġar	Tree Protection Area	IV	
	L-Inħawi Tal-Imtaħleb (Limiti Tar-Rabat)	Area surrounding L-Imtaħleb (Limits of Rabat, Malta)	Żona għall-Ħarsien tas-Siġar	Tree Protection Area	IV	
	Masġar Taż-Żebbuġ (Olea Europaea) Ġol-Ġnien Ta' Blankas (Limiti Tax-Xewkija)	Olive (Olea Europaea) Grove at Ta' Blankas Garden (Limits of Xewkija)	Żona għall-Ħarsien tas-Siġar	Tree Protection Area	IV	
	L-Għoljiet Ta' Ħad-Dingli, Fil-Limiti Ta' Ħad-Dingli	Dingli Cliffs, Limits of Dingli	Santwarju ta' l-Għasafar	Bird Sanctuary	Not Reported	
	Bengħajsa, Fil-Limiti Ta' Birżebbuġa	Bengħajsa, Limits of Birżebbuġa	Santwarju ta' l-Għasafar	Bird Sanctuary	Not Reported	
	Iċ-Ċittadella	Iċ-Ċittadella	Żoni Speċjali ta' Konservazzjoni - Importanza Internazzjonali	Special Areas of Conservation - International Importance	IV	
	Il-Ġebla Tal-Ħalfa	Il-Ġebla tal-Ħalfa	Żoni Speċjali ta' Konservazzjoni - Importanza Nazzjonali	Special Areas of Conservation - National Importance	IV	
	Il-Ħażina (Kemmuna)	Il-Ħażina (Comino)	Żona għall-Ħarsien tas-Siġar	Tree Protection Area	IV	
	Wied Il-Balluta, Limiti Ta' San Ġiljan	Wied il-Balluta, Limits of St. Julian's	Żona ta' Importanza Ekoloġika	Area of Ecological Importance	IV	
	Il-Ġebla Taċ-Ċawla	Il-Ġebla taċ-Ċawla	Żoni Speċjali ta' Konservazzjoni - Importanza Nazzjonali	Special Areas of Conservation - National Importance	IV	
	Ir-Ramla Ta' Għajn Tuffieħa	Għajn Tuffieħa Bay	Xtajtiet Protetti	Protected Beaches	Not Reported	
	L-Għadira S-Safra U L-Iskoll Tal-Għallis	L-Għadira s-Safra and L-Iskoll tal-Għallis	Żoni Speċjali ta' Konservazzjoni - Importanza Internazzjonali	Special Areas of Conservation - International Importance	IV	
	Il-Prajjiet	Il-Prajjiet	Xtajtiet Protetti	Protected Beaches	Not Reported	
	Il-Wied Ta' Għajn Żejtuna (Limiti Tal-Mellieħa)	Wied ta' Għajn Żejtuna (Limits of Mellieħa)	Żona ta' Importanza Ekoloġika	Area of Ecological Importance	IV	
	Il-Bruk (Tamarix Africana) Fir-Ramla Tat-Torri (Limiti Tal-Mtarfa)	African Tamarisk (Tamarix Africana) at Ramla tat-Torri (Limits of Mtarfa)	Żona għall-Ħarsien tas-Siġar	Tree Protection Area	IV	
	Il-Gżejjer Ta' San Pawl / Selmunett		Żoni Speċjali ta' Konservazzjoni - Importanza Internazzjonali	Special Areas of Conservation - International Importance	IV	
	Ta' Baldu / L-Inħawi Ta' Wied Ħażrun (Limiti Tar-Rabat)	Ta' Baldu / Area surrounding Wied Ħażrun (Limits of Rabat, Malta)	Żona għall-Ħarsien tas-Siġar	Tree Protection Area	IV	
	Il-Maqluba (Limiti Tal-Qrendi)	Il-Maqluba (Limits of Qrendi)	Żona għall-Ħarsien tas-Siġar	Tree Protection Area	IV	
	Il-Qala Ta' Santa Marija (Kemmuna)	Santa Marija Bay (Comino)	Żona għall-Ħarsien tas-Siġar	Tree Protection Area	IV	
	Filfla		Żoni ta' Ħarsien Speċjali	Special Protection Areas	IV	
	Il-Gżejjer Ta' San Pawl (Selmunett), Limiti Tal-Mellieħa		Żona ta' Importanza Ekoloġika/Sit ta' Importanza Xjentifika	Area of Ecological Importance/Site of Scientific Importance	IV	
	Il-Ħeliport F'Ta' Lambert Limiti Ta' Għajnsielem U Xewkija, Għawdex	Heliport at Ta' Lambert, Limits of Għajnsielem and Xewkija, Gozo	Santwarju ta' l-Għasafar	Bird Sanctuary	Not Reported	
	Il-Gżejjer Ta' Filfa		Żona ta' Importanza Ekoloġika/Sit ta' Importanza Xjentifika	Area of Ecological Importance/Site of Scientific Importance	IV	
	Wied Ħarq il-Ħamiem U L-Għar Ta' Ħarq il-Ħamiem, Limiti Ta' San Ġiljan U Pembroke	Wied Ħarq il-Ħamiem and Għar ta' Ħarq il-Ħamiem, Limits of St. Julian's and Pembroke	Żona ta' Importanza Ekoloġika/Sit ta' Importanza Xjentifika	Area of Ecological Importance/Site of Scientific Importance	IV	
	Għadajjar Ta' L-Ilma Ħelu Fil-Qaliet (L/Ta' San Ġiljan)	Freshwater Pools at Qaliet (Limits of St. Julian's)	Żona ta' Importanza Ekoloġika/Sit ta' Importanza Xjentifika	Area of Ecological Importance/Site of Scientific Importance	IV	
	Għadajjar Ta' L-Ilma Ħelu Fl-Għadira Ta' Sarraflu (L/Ta' Kerċem, Għawdex)	Freshwater Pools at Ta' Sarraflu Pond (Limits of Kerċem, Gozo)	Żona ta' Importanza Ekoloġika/Sit ta' Importanza Xjentifika	Area of Ecological Importance/Site of Scientific Importance	IV	
	Għadajjar Ta' L-Ilma Ħelu Fl-Għadira S-Safra, Għallis (L/Tan-Naxxar)	Freshwater Pools at L-Għadira s-Safra, Għallis (Limits of Naxxar)	Żona ta' Importanza Ekoloġika/Sit ta' Importanza Xjentifika	Area of Ecological Importance/Site of Scientific Importance	IV	
	Bruka (Tamarix Africana) Fl-Imtaħleb (Limiti Tar-Rabat)	African Tamarisk (Tamarix Africana) at L-Imtaħleb (Limits of Rabat, Malta)	Żona għall-Ħarsien tas-Siġar	Tree Protection Area	IV	
	Is-Simar (limiti ta' San Pawl il-Baħar)		C	Special Protection Area (Birds Directive)	Not Reported	
	L-Inħawi ta' Għajn Barrani	Area surrounding Għajn Barrani	B	Special Areas of Conservation (Habitats Directive)	Not Reported	
	L-Inħawi tal-Buskett u tal-Girgenti		C	Special Protection Area (Birds Directive)	Not Reported	
	Żona fil-Baħar bejn Rdum Majjiesa u Għar Lapsi		B	Sites of Community Importance (Habitats Directive)	Not Reported	
	Bur Salmastru F' Qalet Marku (L/Tan-Naxxar)	Salt Marsh at Qalet Marku (Limits of Naxxar)	Żona ta' Importanza Ekoloġika/Sit ta' Importanza Xjentifika	Area of Ecological Importance/Site of Scientific Importance	IV	
	Il-Ġebla Taċ-Ċawl, Limiti Tal-Qala	Ġebla Taċ-Ċawl, Limits of Qala	Żona ta' Importanza Ekoloġika/Sit ta' Importanza Xjentifika	Area of Ecological Importance/Site of Scientific Importance	IV	
	Wied Rini, Limiti Tar-Rabat	Wied Rini, Limits of Rabat, Malta	Santwarju ta' l-Għasafar	Bird Sanctuary	Not Reported	
	Tal-Virgi (Limiti Ta' Marsaskala)	Tal-Virgi (Limits of Marsaskala)	Żona għall-Ħarsien tas-Siġar	Tree Protection Area	IV	
	L-Ulmu Ingliż (Ulmus Procea) Fi Triq Burmarrad (Limiti Ta' Burmarrad)	English elm (Ulmus Procea) in Burmarrad Road (Limits of Burmarrad)	Żona għall-Ħarsien tas-Siġar	Tree Protection Area	IV	
	Masġar Tal-Għadib (Vitex Agnus-Castus) F’Rdum Majjiesa (Limiti Tal-Mellieħa)		Żona għall-Ħarsien tas-Siġar	Tree Protection Area	IV	
	Filfla		Riserva Naturali (Filfla)	Nature Reserve (Filfla)	Ia	
	Non-Directional Beacon, Forti San Rokku, Limiti Tar-Rinella	Non-Directional Beacon, Fort St. Rocco, Limits of Rinella	Santwarju ta' l-Għasafar	Bird Sanctuary	Not Reported	
	Filfla		Żoni Speċjali ta' Konservazzjoni - Importanza Internazzjonali	Special Areas of Conservation - International Importance	IV	
	Il-Bajja Ta' Mġarr Ix-Xini	Mġarr ix-Xini Bay	Xtajtiet Protetti	Protected Beaches	Not Reported	
	Iċ-Ċagħaq (Limiti Tal-Imġarr)	Iċ-Ċagħaq (Limits of Mġarr, Malta)	Żona għall-Ħarsien tas-Siġar	Tree Protection Area	IV	
	Il-Fikus (Ficus Nitida) Fl-Inħawi Tat-Tlett Siġriet (Limiti Ta' Tas-Sliema)	Ficus tree (Ficus Nitida) in the area known as It-Tliet Siġriet (Limits of Sliema)	Żona għall-Ħarsien tas-Siġar	Tree Protection Area	IV	
	Ramla L-Ħamra, Għawdex	Ramla l-Ħamra / Ramla Bay, Gozo	Żona ta' Importanza Ekoloġika	Area of Ecological Importance	IV	
	Makkja F’Wied Mġarr Ix-Xini (Limiti Ta' Għajnsielem)	Maquis in Wied Mġarr ix-Xini (Limits of Għajnsielem)	Żona għall-Ħarsien tas-Siġar	Tree Protection Area	IV	
	Ġnibru (Juniperus Phoenicea) Fil-Ballut Tal-Wardija (Limiti Ta’ San Pawl Il-Baħar)	Juniper (Juniperus Phoenicea) at Il-Ballut tal-Wardija (Limits of St. Paul's Bay)	Żona għall-Ħarsien tas-Siġar	Tree Protection Area	IV	
	L-Istruttura Ġeomorfoloġika Fl-Inħawi Ta’ Ta’ Lanzun (Limiti Ta’ San Ġwann)	Geomorphic Structure in the area surrounding Ta' Lanzun (Limits of San Ġwann)	Żona Speċjali ta’ Importanza Ġeoloġika	Special Area of Geological Importance	III	
	Bur Salmastru F' Ramlet Il-Qortin (L/Tal-Mellieħa)	Salt marsh at Ramlet il-Qortin (Limits of Mellieħa)	Żona ta' Importanza Ekoloġika/Sit ta' Importanza Xjentifika	Area of Ecological Importance/Site of Scientific Importance	IV	
	Irdumijiet Ta' Madwar Il-Kosta Mill-Ponta Tal-Miġnuna Sal-Bajja Ta' San Tumas F' Wied Il-Għajn	Coastal Cliffs from Tal-Miġnuna Point to St. Thomas' Bay in Marsaskala	Żona ta' Importanza Ekoloġika	Area of Ecological Importance	IV	
	Il-Ġebla Tal-Ġeneral		Riserva Naturali (Gżejjer)	Nature Reserve (Islands)	Ia	
	Għar Dalam	Għar Dalam	Żoni Speċjali ta' Konservazzjoni - Importanza Internazzjonali	Special Areas of Conservation - International Importance	IV	
	Iż-Żebbuġ Tal-Bidnija (Limiti Tal-Mosta)	Olive grove at Bidnija (Limits of Mosta)	Żona għall-Ħarsien tas-Siġar	Tree Protection Area	IV	
	Wied Il-Ħut (Limiti Tar-Rabat)	Wied il-Ħut (Limits of Rabat, Malta)	Żona għall-Ħarsien tas-Siġar	Tree Protection Area	IV	
	Il-Ġummara (Chamaerops Humilis) F’Tal-Merħla (Limiti Tal-Imtaħleb)	Dwarf Fan Palm (Chamaerops Humilis) at Tal-Merħla (Limits of Imtaħleb)	Żona għall-Ħarsien tas-Siġar	Tree Protection Area	IV	
	Iż-Żinżel (Ziziphus Zizyphus) F’Wied L-Isperanza (Limiti Tal-Mosta)	Jujube/Chinese Date (Ziziphus Zizyphus) at Wied L-Isperanza (Limits of Mosta)	Żona għall-Ħarsien tas-Siġar	Tree Protection Area	IV	
	Il-Ballut (Quercus Ilex) F’Palazzo Parisio (Limiti Tan-Naxxar)	Oak trees (Quercus Ilex) at Palazzo Parisio (Limits of Naxxar)	Żona għall-Ħarsien tas-Siġar	Tree Protection Area	IV	
	Il-Bajja Tal-Ġnejna	Ġnejna Bay	Żona ta' Importanza Ekoloġika	Area of Ecological Importance	IV	
	L-Inħawi Tar-Ramla	Area surrounding Ramla Bay	Żoni Speċjali ta' Konservazzjoni - Importanza Internazzjonali	Special Areas of Conservation - International Importance	IV	
	L-Inħawi Ta' Wied Ħarq Ħammiem	Area surrounding Wied Ħarq il-Ħamiem	Żoni Speċjali ta' Konservazzjoni - Importanza Nazzjonali	Special Areas of Conservation - National Importance	IV	
	Ix-Xatt L-Aħmar	Xatt l-Aħmar	Xtajtiet Protetti	Protected Beaches	Not Reported	
	Wied Il-Faħam (Limiti Ta' Ħal Għargħur)	Wied il-Faħam (Limits of Għargħur)	Żona għall-Ħarsien tas-Siġar	Tree Protection Area	IV	
	Għaram Tar-Ramel F'Daħlet Xilep, Il-Mellieħa	Sand dunes at Daħlet Xilep, Mellieħa	Żona ta' Importanza Ekoloġika	Area of Ecological Importance	IV	
	Ġebla Fessej	Ġebla Fessej	Sit ta' Importanza Xjentifika	Site of Scientific Importance	IV	
	Il-Gżejjer Ta' San Pawl	St. Paul's Islands	Santwarju ta' l-Għasafar	Bird Sanctuary	IV	
	Il-Bajja Ta' San Blas	San Blas Bay	Xtajtiet Protetti	Protected Beaches	Not Reported	
	Wied Il-Għasel (Limiti Tal-Mosta)	Wied il-Għasel (Limits of Mosta)	Żona għall-Ħarsien tas-Siġar	Tree Protection Area	IV	
	Il-Wied Tal-Fiddien (Limiti Tar-Rabat)	Wied tal-Fiddien (Limits of Rabat, Malta)	Żona għall-Ħarsien tas-Siġar	Tree Protection Area	IV	
	Żebbuġa (Olea Europea) Fit-Triq Stivala (Limiti Taż-Żebbuġ)	Olive trees (Olea Europea) in Stivala Street (Limits of Żebbuġ, Malta)	Żona għall-Ħarsien tas-Siġar	Tree Protection Area	IV	
	Bidnija, Wardija (Żebbuġ Antik)	Old Olive trees in Bidnija and Wardija	List of Historical Trees Having an Antiquarian Importance	List of Historical Trees Having an Antiquarian Importance	III	
	Bur Salmastru Fil-Ftuħ Ta' Wied Il-Mistra (L/Tal-Mellieħa U San Pawl Il-Baħar)	Salt Marsh in Wied il-Mistra (Limits of Mellieħa and St. Paul's Bay)	Żona ta' Importanza Ekoloġika/Sit ta' Importanza Xjentifika	Area of Ecological Importance/Site of Scientific Importance	IV	
	Il-Maqluba (L/Ta' Qrendi)		Żoni Speċjali ta' Konservazzjoni - Importanza Internazzjonali	Special Areas of Conservation - International Importance	IV	
	Il-Ġonna Ta' San Anton (Siġar Antiki)	Old trees of San Anton Gardens	List of Historical Trees Having an Antiquarian Importance	List of Historical Trees Having an Antiquarian Importance	III	
	Ir-Ramla Tal-Mixquqa	Mixquqa Bay	Xtajtiet Protetti	Protected Beaches	Not Reported	
	Iċ-Ċirku, Ħaż-Żabbar	Iċ-Ċirku, Żabbar	Sit ta' Importanza Xjentifika	Site of Scientific Importance	IV	
	Bur Salmastru F'Ta'Qassisu (L/Tal-Mellieħa)	Salt Marsh at Ta' Qassisu (Limits of Mellieħa)	Żona ta' Importanza Ekoloġika	Area of Ecological Importance	IV	
	Il-Maqluba		Żona ta' Importanza Ekoloġika/Sit ta' Importanza Xjentifika	Area of Ecological Importance/Site of Scientific Importance	IV	
	Ir-Ramla L-Ħamra		Xtajtiet Protetti	Protected Beaches	Not Reported	
	Irdumijiet Ta' Madwar Il-Kosta F'Ta' Buleben, San Pawl Il-Baħar	Coastal Cliffs of Ta' Buleben, St. Paul's Bay	Żona ta' Importanza Ekoloġika	Area of Ecological Importance	IV	
	L-Irdum, L-Għerien U L-Wirt Arkeoloġiku F'Tas-Sellum U Wied Għajn Żejtuna, Limiti Tal-Mellieħa	Cliffs, Caves and Archaeological Heritage at Tas-Sellum and Wied Għajn Żejtuna, Limits of Mellieħa	Żona ta' Importanza Ekoloġika	Area of Ecological Importance	IV	
	Għaram Tar-Ramel U Bur Salmastru Fil-Qala Ta' Santa Marija, Kemmuna	Sand Dunes and Salt Marsh at Santa Marija Bay, Comino	Żona ta' Importanza Ekoloġika/Sit ta' Importanza Xjentifika	Area of Ecological Importance/Site of Scientific Importance	IV	
	Ġebel Ta' Bejn Il-Kmiemen, Limiti Ta' Għajnsielem	Islets between Comino and Cominotto, Limits of Għajnsielem	Żona ta' Importanza Ekoloġika	Area of Ecological Importance	IV	
	Il-Ġonna Ta' Sant' Anton	San Anton Gardens	Santwarju ta' l-Għasafar	Bird Sanctuary	Not Reported	
	Il-Buskett (Siġar Antiki)	Buskett Gardens (Old trees)	List of Historical Trees Having an Antiquarian Importance	List of Historical Trees Having an Antiquarian Importance	III	
	Il-Bajja Tal-Ġnejna		Xtajtiet Protetti	Protected Beaches	Not Reported	
	Wied Tal-Baħrija (Limiti Tar-Rabat)	Wied Tal-Baħrija (Limits of Rabat, Malta)	Żona għall-Ħarsien tas-Siġar	Tree Protection Area	IV	
	Il-Ballut Tal-Imġiebaħ (Limiti Tal-Mellieħa)	Oak trees of L-Imġiebaħ (Limits of Mellieħa)	Żona għall-Ħarsien tas-Siġar	Tree Protection Area	IV	
	Iċ-Ċewsa L-Ħadra (Broussonetia Papyrifera) U L-Maklura (Maclura Pomifera) Fiċ-Ċimiterju Tal-Addolorata (Limiti Tal-Marsa)	Paper mulberry (Broussonetia Papyrifera) and Osage orange (Maclura Pomifera) at Addolorata Cemetery / Our Lady of Sorrows Cemetery (Limiti Tal-Marsa)	Żona għall-Ħarsien tas-Siġar	Tree Protection Area	IV	
	Wied Blandun Limiti Tal-Fgura U Raħal Ġdid	Wied Blandun, Limits of Fgura and Paola	Żona ta' Importanza Ekoloġika/Sit ta' Importanza Xjentifika	Area of Ecological Importance/Site of Scientific Importance	IV	
	Siġar F'Kennedy Grove, Is-Salini, Limiti Ta' San Pawl Il-Baħar U N-Naxxar	Trees at Kennedy Grove, Salini, Limits of St. Paul's Bay and Naxxar	Żona ta' Importanza Ekoloġika	Area of Ecological Importance	IV	
	Għaram Tar- Ramel Fir-Ramla Tat-Torri, Limiti Tal Mellieħa	Sand Dunes at Ramla tat-Torri, Limits of Mellieħa	Żona ta' Importanza Ekoloġika/Sit ta' Importanza Xjentifika	Area of Ecological Importance/Site of Scientific Importance	IV	
	Għar Il-Friefet	Għar Il-Friefet	Sit ta' Importanza Xjentifika	Site of Scientific Importance	IV	
	Għadajjar Ta' L-Ilma Ħelu F'Għajn Klin, Ix-Xatt L-Aħmar (L/Ta' Għajnsielem, Għawdex)	Freshwater pools at Għajn Klin, Xatt l-Aħmar (Limits of Għajnsielem, Gozo)	Żona ta' Importanza Ekoloġika/Sit ta' Importanza Xjentifika	Area of Ecological Importance/Site of Scientific Importance	IV	
	Għadajjar Ta' L-Ilma Ħelu Fil-Qammieħ	Freshwater pools at Qammieħ	Żona ta' Importanza Ekoloġika/Sit ta' Importanza Xjentifika	Area of Ecological Importance/Site of Scientific Importance	IV	
	Il-Ġebla Tal-Ġeneral, Limiti Ta' San Lawrenz	Fungus Rock, Limits of San Lawrenz	Żona ta' Importanza Ekoloġika/Sit ta' Importanza Xjentifika	Area of Ecological Importance/Site of Scientific Importance	IV	
	Żona fil-Baħar fil-Punent	Western Marine Area	B	Sites of Community Importance (Habitats Directive)	Not Reported	
	Żona fil-Baħar fl-inħawi tal-Punent tal-Graben ta’ Malta		B	Sites of Community Importance (Habitats Directive)	Not Reported	
	L-Inħawi tad-Dwejra u tal-Qawra, inkluż Ħaġret il-Ġeneral		B	Special Areas of Conservation (Habitats Directive)	Not Reported	
	L-Inħawi ta' Ta' Ċenċ		B	Special Areas of Conservation (Habitats Directive)	Not Reported	
	Żona fil-Baħar fit-Tramuntana		Special Protection Area (Birds Directive)	Special Protection Area (Birds Directive)	Not Reported	
	Żona fil-Baħar fil-Lvant		Special Protection Area (Birds Directive)	Special Protection Area (Birds Directive)	Not Reported	
	Iż-Żinżel (Ziziphus Zizyphus) Fl-Imtaħleb (Limiti Tar-Rabat)	Jujube/Chinese Date (Ziziphus Zizyphus) at L-Imtaħleb (Limits of Rabat, Malta)	Żona għall-Ħarsien tas-Siġar	Tree Protection Area	IV	
	Żebbuġ (Olea Europaea), Żnuber (Pinus Halepensis) U Ballut (Quercus Ilex) Ġol-Ġnien Ta’ Villa Frere (Limiti Tal-Pietà)	Olive trees (Olea Europaea), Aleppo Pine trees (Pinus Halepensis) and Oak trees (Quercus Ilex) at Villa Frere Gardens (Limits of Pietà)	Żona għall-Ħarsien tas-Siġar	Tree Protection Area	IV	
	Wied il-Mielaħ u l-Inħawi tal-Madwar		C	Special Protection Area (Birds Directive)	Not Reported	
	Żona fil-Baħar fl-inħawi tal-Majjistral tal-Graben ta’ Malta		B	Sites of Community Importance (Habitats Directive)	Not Reported	
	Żona fil-Baħar fl-inħawi tal-Graben tat-Tramuntana ta’ Għawdex		B	Sites of Community Importance (Habitats Directive)	Not Reported	
	Żona fil-Baħar fl-Inħawi tad-Dwejra (Għawdex)		B	Sites of Community Importance (Habitats Directive)	Not Reported	
	Żona fil-Baħar fl-inħawi tal-Graben ta’ Medina		B	Sites of Community Importance (Habitats Directive)	Not Reported	
	Rdumijiet ta' Għawdex: Il-Ponta ta' Ħarrux sal-Bajja tax-Xlendi		Special Protection Area (Birds Directive)	Special Protection Area (Birds Directive)	Not Reported	
	L-Għar tal-Iburdan u l-Inħawi tal-Madwar		B	Special Areas of Conservation (Habitats Directive)	Not Reported	
	Il-Qortin tal-Magun u l-Qortin il-Kbir		B	Special Areas of Conservation (Habitats Directive)	Not Reported	
	Żona fil-Baħar fl-Inħawi ta' Għar Lapsi u ta' Filfla	Marine Area surrounding Għar Lapsi and Filfla	B	Sites of Community Importance (Habitats Directive)	Not Reported	
	Żona fil-Baħar fix-Xlokk		Special Protection Area (Birds Directive)	Special Protection Area (Birds Directive)	Not Reported	
	Żona fil-Baħar madwar Għawdex		Special Protection Area (Birds Directive)	Special Protection Area (Birds Directive)	Not Reported	
	Żona fil-Baħar bejn Il-Ponta tal-Ħotba u Tal-Fessej (Għawdex)		B	Sites of Community Importance (Habitats Directive)	Not Reported	
	Il-Ballut tal-Wardija		B	Special Areas of Conservation (Habitats Directive)	Not Reported	
	L-Inħawi tar-Ramla tat-Torri u tal-Irdum tal-Madonna		C	Special Protection Area (Birds Directive)	Not Reported	
	Il-Maqluba (limiti tal-Qrendi)		B	Special Areas of Conservation (Habitats Directive)	Not Reported	
	L-Inħawi ta' Ħas-Saptan		B	Sites of Community Importance (Habitats Directive)	Not Reported	
	L-Inħawi tar-Ramla		B	Special Areas of Conservation (Habitats Directive)	Not Reported	
	Ix-Xagħra tal-Kortin		B	Special Areas of Conservation (Habitats Directive)	Not Reported	
	L-Għadira s-Safra	Għadira s-Safra	B	Special Areas of Conservation (Habitats Directive)	Not Reported	
	Għar Dalam		B	Special Areas of Conservation (Habitats Directive)	Not Reported	
	Il-Gżejjer ta' San Pawl (Selmunett)		B	Special Areas of Conservation (Habitats Directive)	Not Reported	
	Il-Magħluq tal-Baħar ta' Marsaskala		B	Special Areas of Conservation (Habitats Directive)	Not Reported	
	Rdumijiet ta' Malta: Ir-Ramla taċ-Ċirkewwa sal-Ponta ta' Bengħisa	Cliffs of Malta: from Ċirkewwa Bay to Bengħisa Point	B	Special Areas of Conservation (Habitats Directive)	Not Reported	
	Wied il-Miżieb		B	Special Areas of Conservation (Habitats Directive)	Not Reported	
	Filfla u l-Gżejjer ta' Madwarha	Filfla and surrounding islets	C	Special Protection Area (Birds Directive)	Not Reported	
	Kemmuna u l-Gżejjer ta' Madwarha	Comino and surrounding islets	C	Special Protection Area (Birds Directive)	Not Reported	
	L-Inħawi tal-Għadira		C	Special Protection Area (Birds Directive)	Not Reported	
	Il-Ballut ta' Marsaxlokk	Oak trees at Marsaxlokk	B	Special Areas of Conservation (Habitats Directive)	Not Reported	
	Is-Salini		B	Special Areas of Conservation (Habitats Directive)	Not Reported	
	Iċ-Ċittadella		B	Special Areas of Conservation (Habitats Directive)	Not Reported	
	L-Inħawi tax-Xlendi u tal-Wied tal-Kantra		B	Special Areas of Conservation (Habitats Directive)	Not Reported	
	L-Inħawi tal-Imġiebaħ u tal-Miġnuna		B	Special Areas of Conservation (Habitats Directive)	Not Reported	
	L-Inħawi ta' Pembroke		B	Special Areas of Conservation (Habitats Directive)	Not Reported	
	Rdumijiet ta' Għawdex: Ta' Ċenċ		Special Protection Area (Birds Directive)	Special Protection Area (Birds Directive)	Not Reported	
	Rdumijiet ta' Għawdex: Id-Dawra tas-Sanap sa Tal-Ħajt		Special Protection Area (Birds Directive)	Special Protection Area (Birds Directive)	Not Reported	
	Rdumijiet ta' Għawdex: Il-Ponta ta' San Dimitri sal-Ponta ta' Ħarrux		Special Protection Area (Birds Directive)	Special Protection Area (Birds Directive)	Not Reported	
	Rdumijiet ta' Malta: Ras il-Pellegrin sax-Xaqqa		Special Protection Area (Birds Directive)	Special Protection Area (Birds Directive)	Not Reported	
	Rdumijiet ta' Malta: Wied Moqbol sal-Ponta ta' Bengħisa	Cliffs of Malta: from Wied Moqbol to Bengħisa Point	Special Protection Area (Birds Directive)	Special Protection Area (Birds Directive)	Not Reported	
	Żona fil-Baħar fil-Majjistral		Special Protection Area (Birds Directive)	Special Protection Area (Birds Directive)	Not Reported	
	Żona fil-Baħar fil-Grigal		Special Protection Area (Birds Directive)	Special Protection Area (Birds Directive)	Not Reported	
	L-Inħawi tal-Wej		B	Sites of Community Importance (Habitats Directive)	Not Reported	
	Żona fil-Baħar bejn Il-Ponta ta’ San Dimitri (Għawdex) u Il-Qaliet		B	Sites of Community Importance (Habitats Directive)	Not Reported	
	Rdumijiet ta' Malta: Ix-Xaqqa sa Wied Moqbol		Special Protection Area (Birds Directive)	Special Protection Area (Birds Directive)	Not Reported	
	Żona fil-Baħar fin-Nofsinhar		Special Protection Area (Birds Directive)	Special Protection Area (Birds Directive)	Not Reported	
	Żona fil-Baħar fil-Lbiċ		Special Protection Area (Birds Directive)	Special Protection Area (Birds Directive)	Not Reported	
	Wied il-Mielaħ u l-Inħawi tal-Madwar		C	Sites of Community Importance (Habitats Directive)	Not Reported	
	Filfla u l-Gżejjer ta' Madwarha		C	Special Areas of Conservation (Habitats Directive)	Not Reported	
	Kemmuna u l-Gżejjer ta' Madwarha		C	Special Areas of Conservation (Habitats Directive)	Not Reported	
	Is-Simar (limiti ta' San Pawl il-Baħar)		C	Special Areas of Conservation (Habitats Directive)	Not Reported	
	L-Inħawi tal-Buskett u tal-Girgenti		C	Special Areas of Conservation (Habitats Directive)	Not Reported	
	L-Inħawi tar-Ramla tat-Torri u tal-Irdum tal-Madonna		C	Special Areas of Conservation (Habitats Directive)	Not Reported	
	L-Inħawi tal-Għadira		C	Special Areas of Conservation (Habitats Directive)	Not Reported	
