= Dwejra Bay to San Dimitri Point Important Bird Area =

Important Bird Area in Malta

Coordinates: 36°04′N 14°11′E

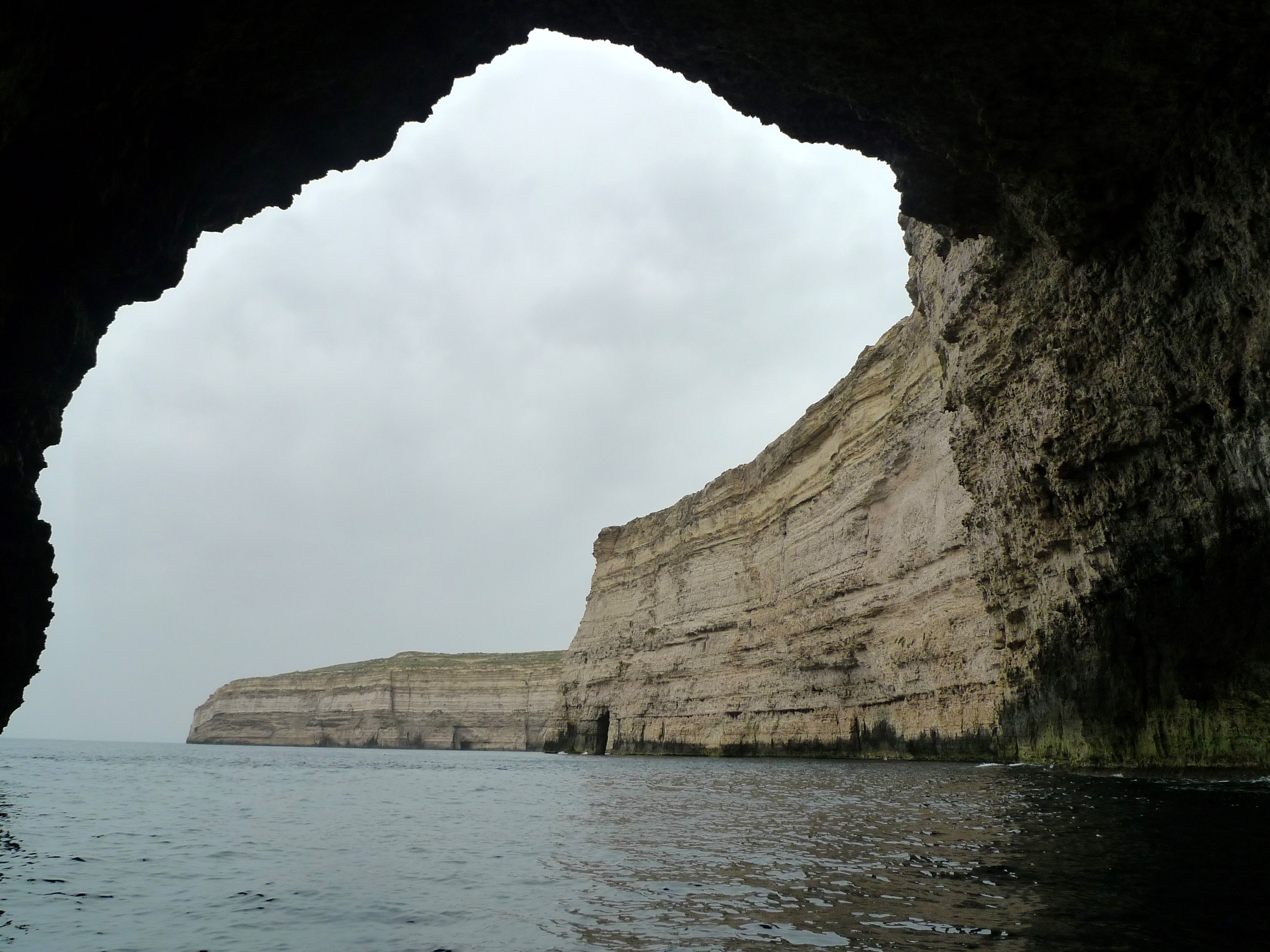
Cliffs at Dwejra Bay

The Dwejra Bay to San Dimitri Point Important Bird Area comprises a 36 ha linear strip of cliffed coastline in San Lawrenz and Għarb, at the northwestern end of the island of Gozo, in the Maltese archipelago in the Mediterranean Sea. Its steep and rugged cliffs rise from sea level to a height of 105 m. It was identified as an Important Bird Area (IBA) by BirdLife International because it supports 400–500 breeding pairs of Cory's shearwaters and 30–50 pairs of yelkouan shearwaters.

== See also ==
- List of birds of Malta
