= Il-Ballut ta' Marsaxlokk =

Protected area in Malta

- IUCN category IV (habitat/species management area)
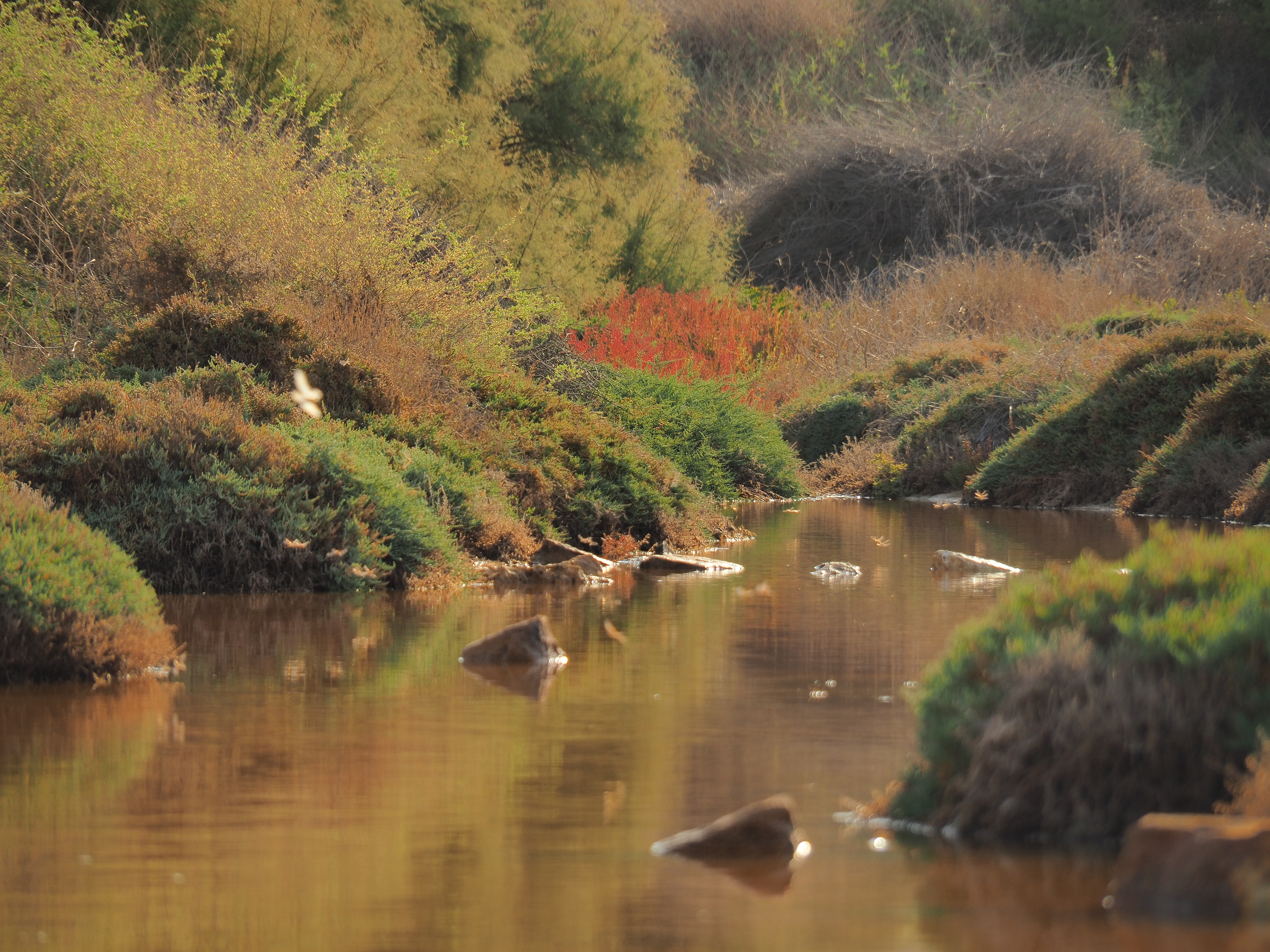
- Il-Ballut ta' Marsaxlokk in October 2019

- Location within Malta
- Location: South Eastern Region
- Nearest city: Żejtun, Malta
- Coordinates: 35°50′20.1″N 14°32′57.1″E
- Area: 23 ha (57 acres)
- Governing body: Nature Trust Malta

Il-Ballut ta' Marsaxlokk is a protected area in Marsaxlokk, Malta, which forms part of the Natura 2000 network in the territory of the European Union. The protected area (circa 23 ha.) features a salt marsh (circa 1ha) which is currently managed by Nature Trust Malta.

== History ==
The salt marsh known by locals as 'Il-Kanal' or 'Ir-Riserva' was previously used a hunting ground. In the 1980’s the area received the attention of the then Society for the Study and Conservation of Nature (SSCN) (now part of Nature Trust Malta). The site was undergoing constant and severe degradation, especially due to the dumping of rubble from the construction of the Delimara Powerstation at Ras ic-Cagħaq.

More dumping took place during 1999 when mounds of sand, soil and rubble were placed just outside the reserve in what seems to have been an attempt at beach replenishment.

Later the site was awarded environmental protection but only started to be officially managed in 2018 when Nature Trust Malta took over the management of the site through an agreement with the Environment and Resources Authority (ERA).

== Ecology ==
The area is composed of mostly muddy substrate characterised by a few dredged shallow canals. These canals were deeper in the past but siltation of nearby illegally dumped material resulted in the loss of depth. This effect combined with the loss of a hydrological connection to il-Magħluq ta' Marsaxlokk(the port), resulted in the seasonal desiccation of the canals in the dry period (summer). Coupled with nutrient pollution, this has resulted in the loss of the Aphanius fasciatus that used to be found on site.

The area hosts communities of salt marsh vegetation in Malta such as Salicornia sp.; Juncus sp. and Arthrocnenum sp., among others.

=== Avi-Fauna ===
Such a small wetland located in very close proximity to the sea lures vagrant, rare and scarce birds . The salt-marsh serves as a refuge to a variety of resident and migratory birds, due to the shelter and food resources that may be found in the area. Flat muddy stretches are particularly suitable for waders such as the Common Sandpiper. Sedentary species take advantage of the shrubs that surround the area. It has also been established that the area is an important location for wintering birds that usually migrate to milder temperatures to avoid freezing temperatures in the north of the European continent.

Over 90 different species of birds were observed in ornithological research carried out between 2014 – 2020. The first record of a Brown Shrike in Malta was recorded in November 2017 inside the salt-marsh.

== Conservation Efforts ==
Efforts for the conservation of the area have focused on the multiple aspects of the area. There are both large and small issues which are being addressed through the intervention and coordination of Nature Trust Malta, Environment and Resources Authority, Infrastructure Malta and the Marsaxlokk Local Council.

Cleanups are a regular part of the routine work carried out by Nature Trust Malta teams. The planting of indigenous species such as Pancartium martimum and Juncus martimus are also a part of the efforts to reinforce populations of such vegetation.

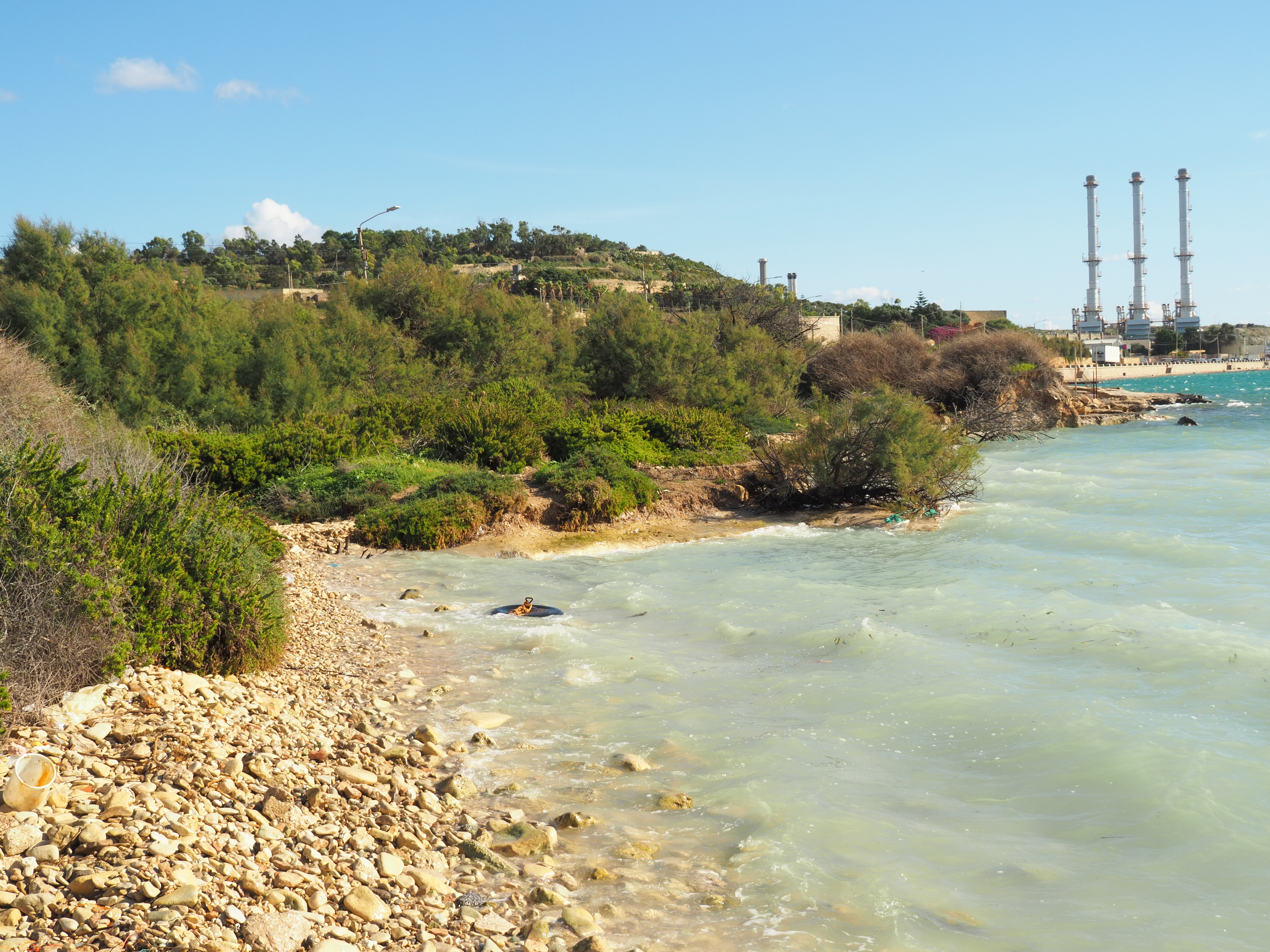
Coastal erosion affecting il-Ballut ta' Marsaxlokk Salt Marsh

== Threats ==
The following represent some of the most salient threats to the area -

- Coastal erosion
- Water pollution from runoff
- Plastic pollution from the bay
- Compromised hydrological features such as connection to the sea
- Trampling of vegetation
- Light pollution
- Invasive alien species
