= Għar Ħarq Ħamiem =

Maltese cave

- Dragonara
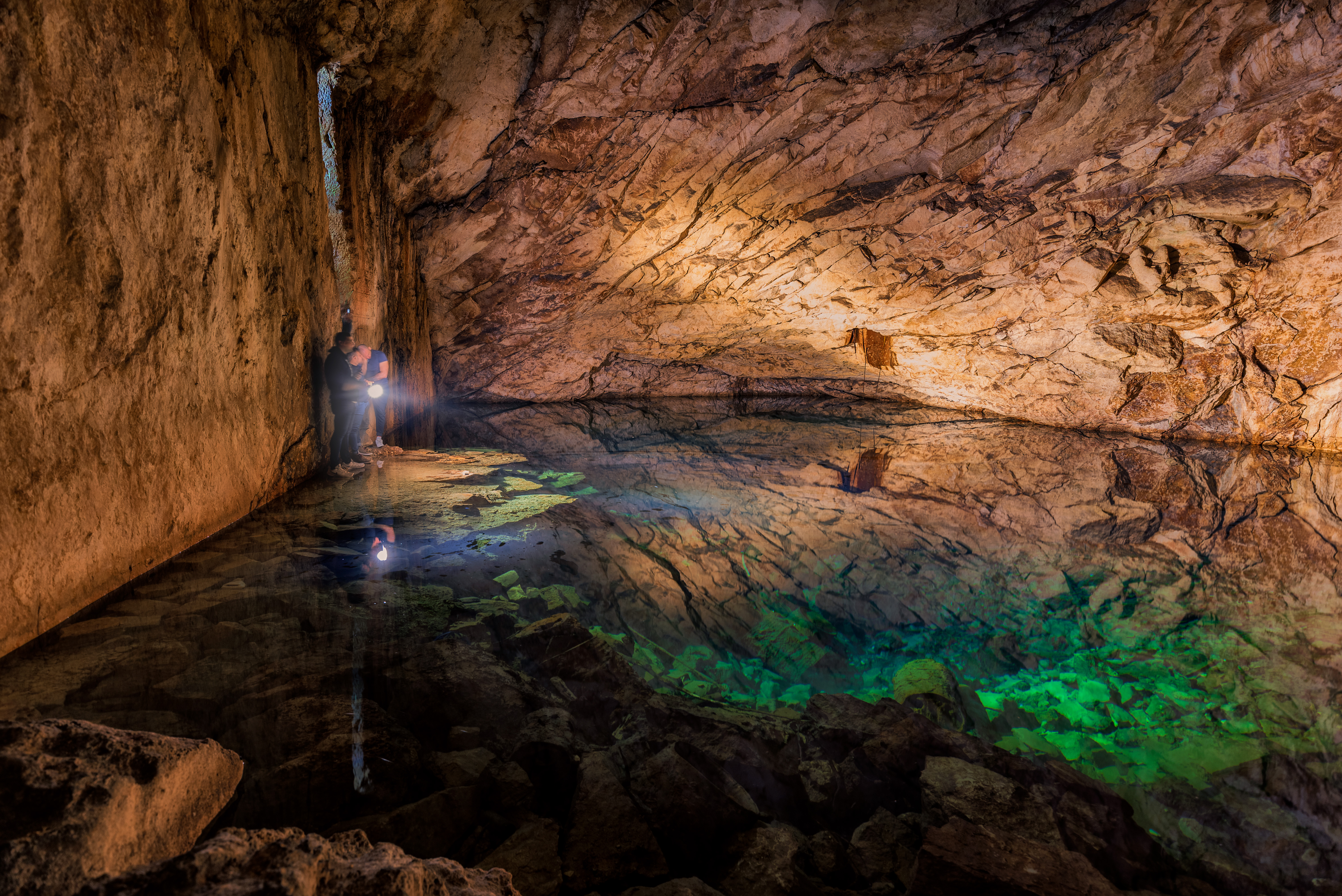
- A view of the cave overlooking its entrance
- Interactive map of Għar Ħarq Ħamiem
- Location: St. Julian's, Malta
- Coordinates: 35.927121°N 14.486948°E
- Depth: Maximum depth about 52 metres below sea level
- Length: Approximately 20–30 metres
- Geology: Anchialine cave
- Access: Upper chamber accessible via sea‑level entrance; lower chamber accessible only by diving

Għar Ħarq Ħamiem (also known as Dragonara or Għar Ħarq il-Ħammiem) is a natural anchialine cave located adjacent to St. George's Bay in St. Julian's, Malta. It is the only known cave of its kind in the country, inhabited by an endemic species of amphipod. The cave consists of two chambers, with an upper accessible chamber that is connected to a lower inaccessible chamber through a narrow underwater corridor. The site, together with Wied Ħarq Ħamiem beside it, was designated as an Area of Ecological Importance and Site of Scientific Importance by the Maltese Government in 2008.

== History ==
The name Chark El Hamiem was first described by Giovanni Francesco Abela in his 1647 book, Della Descrittione Di Malta, to mean cleft of doves, indicating the formerly ajar ceiling of the upper chamber from which birds used to enter the cave. The more modern Dragonara name was attributed to the cave by locals due to the legend of a dragon inhabiting it. This idea likely arose due to the sound of moving water inside the cave likely caused by the presence of eels within it. By 1772, Count Giovanni Antonio Ciantar, recalls in his book, Malta Illustrata, that a knight by the name of Bailiff Spinola had planned to use the cave's water for irrigating the Spinola Palace some distance away. This resulted in the closure of the natural opening at the ceiling of the upper chamber and the excavation of the artificial entrance at the side of it.

The first known map of Malta depicting the cave.

The first known cartographic documentation of the cave occurs in the same book by Count Ciantar. The area was also documented in British-era geological and Ordnance Survey maps, with the 1956 British Survey of Malta indicating the location of this cave within Ordinance Survey Sheet number 43.

== Geohydrology ==
The cave was formed due to a series of complex processes including karstification during the pleistocene era, making it at least 10,000 years old. Together with the subsequent collapse of the fractured rock, the existing upper chamber was produced. This rises to approximately 10 metres above sea level, and ends up at about 9 metres below it. It is 20 metres high, by 22 metres wide, and 24 metres long. The lower chamber descends to about 50 metres below sea level with its roof rising to approximately 18.5 metres below sea level.

Longitudinal schematic of the Dragonara cave.

A thermocline exists within the first 3 metres of diving, with a chemocline and halocline that may be observed at about 18 metres underwater. This coincides with the varying salinity levels of the water, with freshwater at the top of the cave, that becomes brackish towards the floor of the lower chamber. At the very bottom, the water exhibits sea water characteristics. This implies that the cave is very likely connected to St George's bay nearby, although no path is currently known.
