= Borkum West =

Borkum West can refer to

- Alpha Ventus Offshore Wind Farm, also known as Borkum West
- Borkum West II wind farm
