= Tripod (foundation) =

Foundation for wind turbines

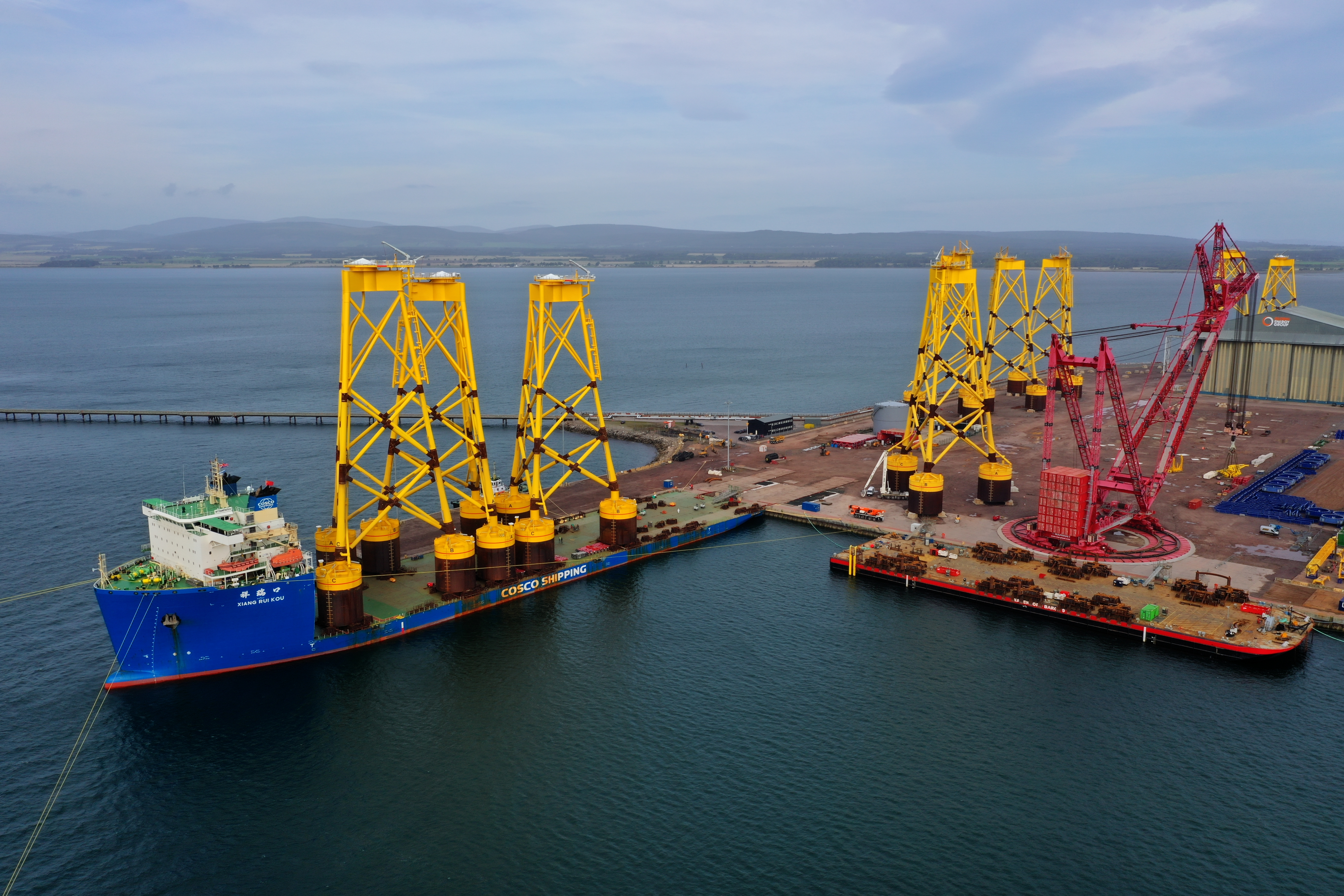
Ring crane and tripod jacket foundations on heavy-lift ship

The tripod or jacket is a type of foundation for offshore wind turbines. The tripod is generally more expensive than other types of foundation. However, for large turbines and higher water depth, the cost disadvantage might be compensated when durability is also taken into account.

== History ==
=== Start of the offshore wind industry ===
The exploration of offshore wind energy started with the introduction of monopile foundations for wind turbines in a range from 1 up to 3MW in water depth of about 10 to 20m during the 1990s. Germany has been facing water depths up to 40m, when it joined this new field of renewable energy. At the same time the 5MW turbine class appeared. One representative of this new turbine generation was the Multibrid M5000 with a rotor diameter of 116m, later 135m under the labels Areva and Adwen. The first prototype of this machine was erected in Bremerhaven in 2004 onshore. Already in this stage Bremerhaven had supported the development on behalf of BIS Bremerhavener Gesellschaft für Investitionsförderung und Stadtentwicklung mbH.

=== Development of the tripod foundation ===
Since the new century, there has been a search for a feasible foundation for the upcoming large turbines and greater water depths, in light of the available geotechnical assessment methods, fabrication processes, pile driving equipment and logistic and installation equipment. One result was the Tripod foundation. The first design was drawn by OWT – Offshore Wind Technology in Leer (Germany) in 2005. The Tripod was integrally designed with the tower from this early beginning. The three-legged structure reaches from the sea bed up to typically 20m above the sea water level, keeping the bolted flange on top safely apart from the crest of the waves. This section allows to be outfitted onshore with all functionalities needed in terms of boat landing, cable guiding and last but not least corrosion protection systems. The central column is designed as an open system allowing an unrestricted water exchange in each tide cycle. This circumstance is beneficial when the corrosion protection system has to be designed for the inner surfaces.

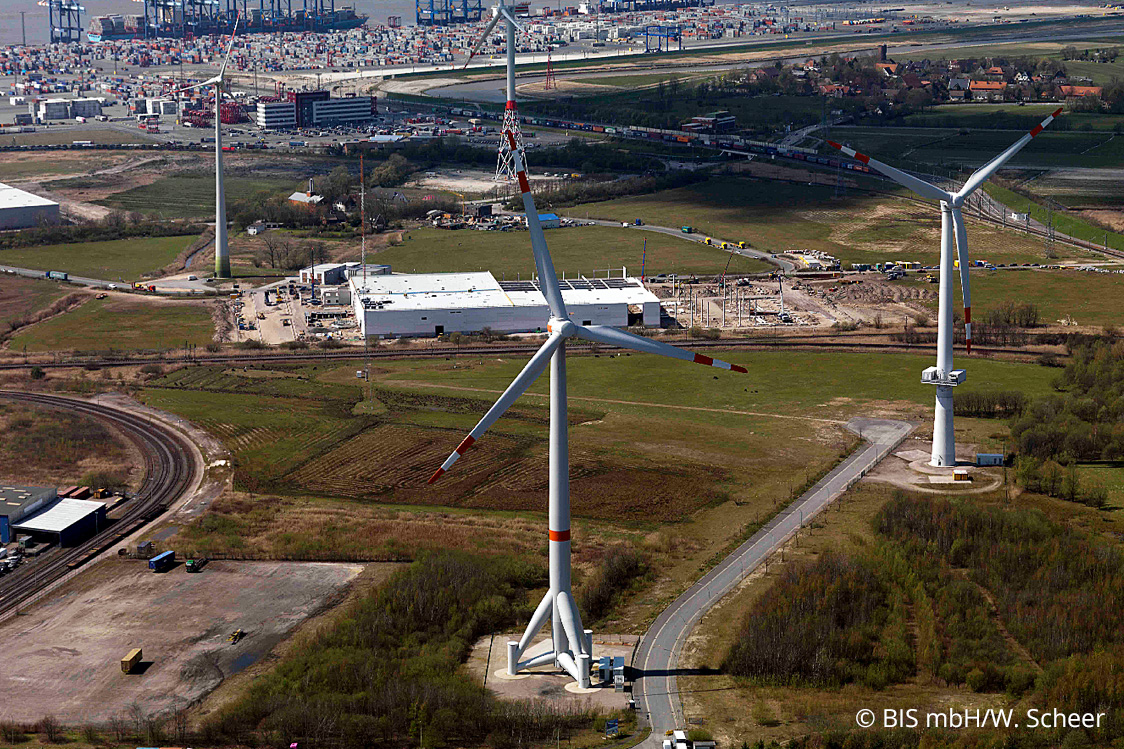
An onshore wind turbine using a tripod foundation. This particular wind turbine is a Multibrid M5000, and so is the non-tripod wind turbine to its left. Behind it is an Enercon turbine, likely an E-82.

The Tripod is fixed with midsized pin piles at the sea bed. The piles might be pre piled or post piled. A suction bucket foundation was designed as well. The first tower section, called S3, is foreseen to be mounted offshore on top of the Tripod with a bolted flange connection. This section contains the outer service platform and the entry door. This section is independently accessible for electrical equipment and cold commissioning procedures. Additionally it provides simply height, what can be saved on Tripod side. The height of a Tripod amounts already about 60m for 40m water depth.

In 2006 a Tripod onshore demonstrator was designed by OWT for Multibrid GmbH, manufactured and erected in Bremerhaven, Germany, by WeserWind GmbH Offshore Construction Georgsmarienhütte. This was the beginning of a long lasting collaboration between the turbine developer and manufacturer Multibrid, the foundation designer OWT and the fabricator WeserWind. Meanwhile, the design covers the demands of an offshore turbine foundation to sufficient extent, the fabrication was even challenging regarding size and shape of the structure. That time WeserWind was supported in terms of fabrication and assembly by its sister company IAG Industrieanlagenbau Georgsmarienhütte GmbH, a member of the Georgsmarienhütte group as well. The first operation of the turbine was accompanied by the research project IMO-Wind. The first steps in condition monitoring have been undertaken including the determination of stress curves, the so-called "Hot spot" Survey, in order to enable the comparison with calculation models.

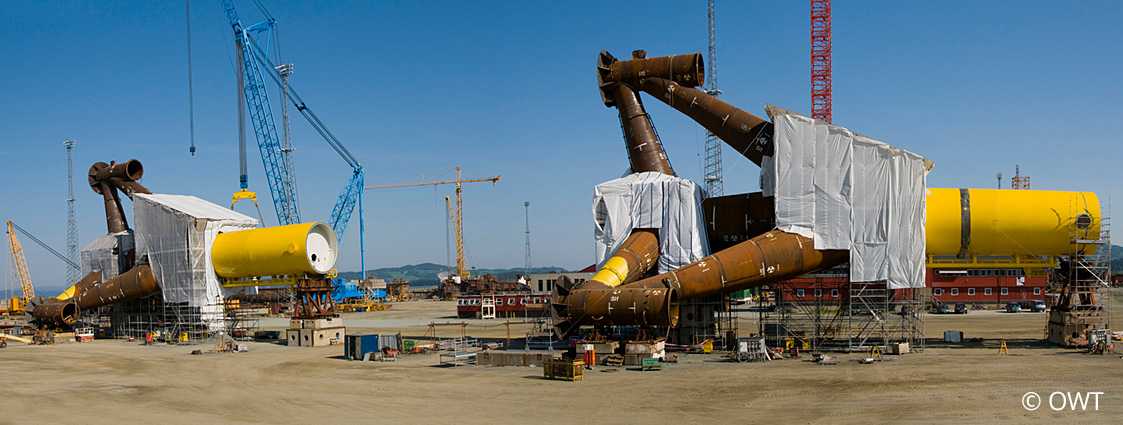
Horizontal assembly at Aker Yards in 2008

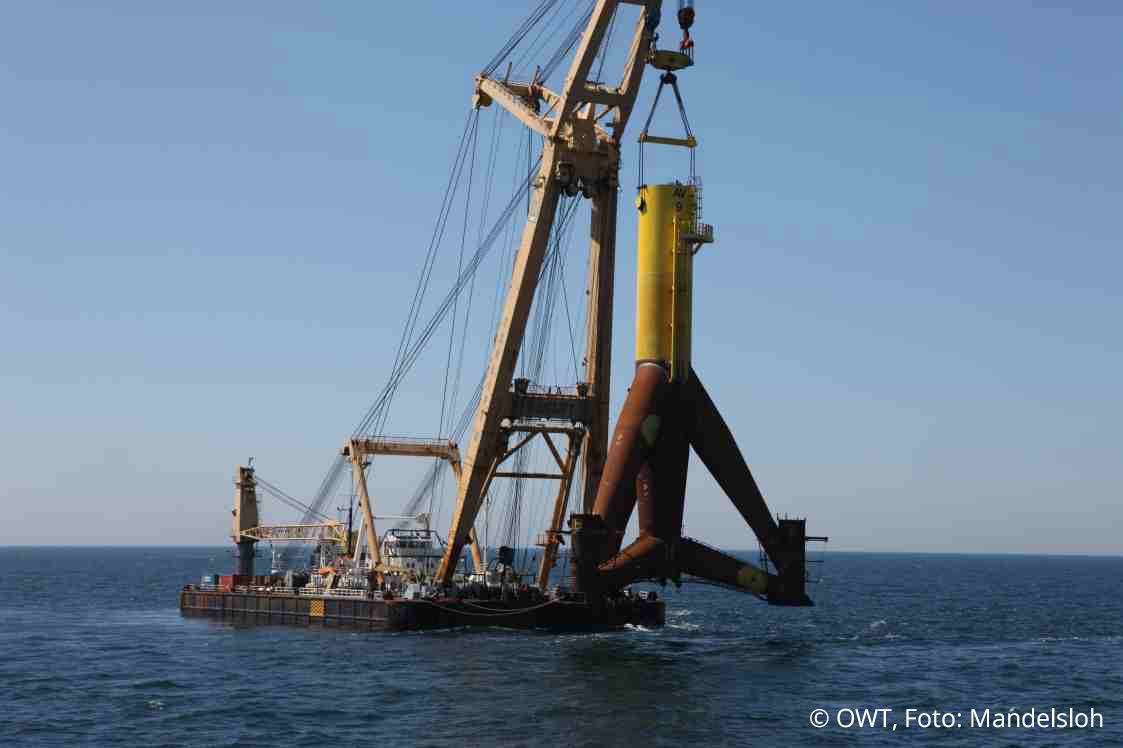
Sail out with Taklift 4 to Alpha Ventus 2009

=== Large scale deployments ===
In 2008 Tripods were built as a substructure for six Multibrid M5000 offshore wind turbines in the Alpha Ventus project. Alpha Ventus was planned as a first test field for the exploration of offshore wind energy in German waters. The project organisation has been Deutsche Offshore-Testfeld und Infrastruktur GmbH & Co. KG, DOTI. It was founded in 2006 by EWE AG (47,5%), E.ON Climate & Renewables Central Europe GmbH and Vattenfall Europe Windkraft GmbH (each 26,25%) assisted by Stiftung Offshore Windenergie. The German Federal Ministry of Environment BMU supported a number of research projects, which were summarized in the RAVE initiative (Research at Alpha Ventus). A broad basis of experience and knowledge was gained for the construction, commissioning and operation for future offshore wind farms. The Tripods were fabricated by Aker Kvaerner in Verdal, Norway. A horizontal assembly of the Tripods was realized in accordance to the local fabrication experience of the yard, coming from large oil and gas jacket fabrication, with subsequent upending and of course upright sailing from Norway to the offshore terminal in Eemshaven. The transportation of the Tripods to the location was done by Taklift 4 from Royal Boskalis one by one.

The year 2010 marked the next milestone in rolling out the M5000 turbine with the Tripod foundation. The two projects Borkum West II and Global Tech I decided to erect their farms using this technology platform. 40 Tripods were ordered by each project in first instance nearly at the same time. Anticipating this demand WeserWind has developed a serial production approach for Tripods in the years before, together with Dr. Möller GmbH / IMS Nord, Bremerhaven. The key parameters of this approach are the upright assembly concept, the setup of an assembly line with up to nine work stations, the transportation of the growing structures on behalf of heavy load rail carriers along the assembly line and the integrated load out operation to a tailor-made pontoon. Based on this concept Georgsmarienhütte released the investment program building this assembly shop with two parallel lines at Lunedeich, Bremerhaven. The building was operational in the beginning of 2011 and in June the first Borkum-West II-Tripod was completed.

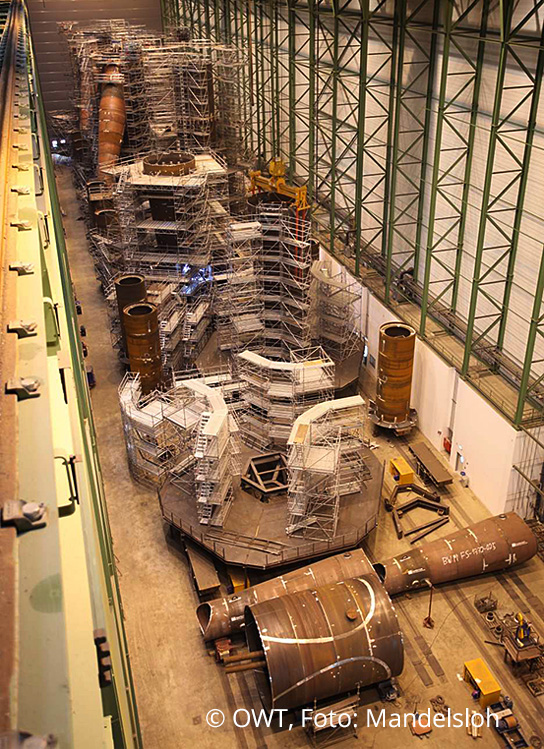
Serial production in upright position at WeserWind

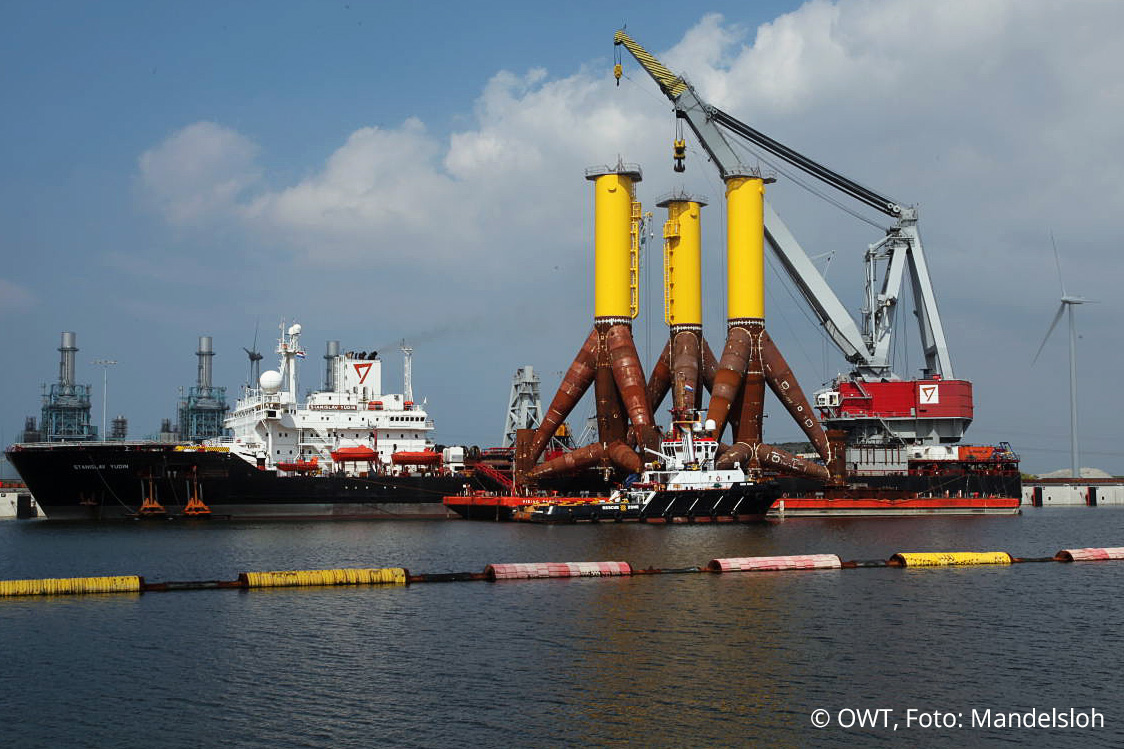
Three Tripods on board of Stanislaw Yudin ready for sail out

In December 2011 the pontoon was baptised and the offshore terminal ABC-Peninsula was commissioned by BLG Logistics Solutions GmbH & Co. KG after essential upgrading. Finally 100 Tripods have been built at this site in the years from 2011 to 2013. The cycle time for the whole plant was reached with down to five calendar days per structure. The load out cycle was achieved to four hours. Also SIAG Emden and the consortium Iemants N.V. with Eiffage Construction Métallique S.A.S. in Vlissingen produced in total 20 Tripods in that time in upright position. The offshore transportation technology has been developed significantly since Alpha Ventus. The Offshore Construction Jack Up “Innovation” by HGO InfraSea Solutions GmbH & Co. KG was commissioned in 2012 and did her first job for Global Tech 1 carrying three Tripods and pile sets per sail. The crane ships “Stanislaw Yudin” and “Oleg Strassnow” by SHL Seaway Heavy Lifting were in operation for Borkum West II.

== Specific technical characteristics ==
=== Suitability and use conditions ===
The peculiarity of the Tripod is the combination of the above-water structure like a Monopile solution with small exposed surface, robust performance in risk scenarios and easy transition to the tower part with the supporting effect and performance of a lattice structure. Hot spots are avoided in the aggressive environment of splash zone by design allowing a free corrosion fatigue assessment.

In the wind energy, the coordination of the dynamics of the structure, characterized by the frequencies it mainly swings, is of special importance due to the excitation by the turbine rotor. The Tripod behaviour is between the Monopile, which tends to be softer and the Jacket, which in turn is more rigid.

The application area in terms of water depth was initially predicted to at least 25 meters water depth up to 50m. The impressively growing Monopile technology within the last years moved their field of application far to 40m nowadays. Therefore, the Tripod disappeared from the scene. Beside the higher fabrication effort for Tripods, transport and installation efforts might become even more comparable the more the structures grow. Finally the dedicated suitability of the Tripod to corrosion protection systems will remain a significant difference to the Monopile. The performance of the structures over the life time and due diligence assessments of the assets in later life cycle stages might give reason for reconciliation of the arguments.

Comparable to other lattice structures like Jackets, the Tripod is fixed with piles in the sea bed. The number of three legs results in sufficient stability in the unpiled or ungrouted situation what comes back with a reliable weather window for installation. The design parameters for the piles can be independently chosen from the Tripod itself and reflect the geotechnical needs explicitly. There is no need to apply scour protection.

The connection to the pile is usually achieved using a grouted connection. This is a technique where special concrete is poured in the joint gap between pile and pile sleeve. Due to the resulting composite effect the loads are transferred from the sleeve to the pile, and thus into the ground. A submerged grouting process requires high competence in design, planning and execution of the processes. The stable moderate temperature under water supports the temperature sensitive grout curing process.

=== Structural backgrounds ===
The supporting action is based on the deflection of the bending moment of the tower to the piles, which are then essentially only pulled or pushed. This requires a combination of upper and lower legs which build up the leverage. Alternatively, a suction bucket can be used instead of the pile. In comparison, the monopile distributes its loads by laterally stabilizing into the ground.

Tubular nodes are the characteristic design element in lattice structures, where tubes intersect each other. It is preferred that incoming tubes, the stubs, remain in certain ratio of the diameters (0.8) to the continuous tube, the chord, to achieve efficient load bearing effects. This effect determines to the final dimensional ratios.

The plate thicknesses within offshore foundations are well adapted to the local load situations. A balanced material utilisation can be achieved by design because the dimension of an offshore foundation is large compared to the dimension of hot rolled plates. Tripods and Monopiles are shell structures. Their wall thickness is relatively small compared to the diameter. Therefore, they have to be proven in terms of shell buckling. The tower, central tube and legs are assembled of cylindrical or conical sections, cans, with an individual length of 2 to 4m. The wall thicknesses are in the range of 40 to 60mm in the central column, a few cans in high-stress areas up to 90mm. The wall thicknesses of the conical legs range from 20 to 30mm.

The lifetime is a central requirement to the design. In the classic oil and gas industry offshore wave loads have already been taken into account. The operation of wind turbine generators causes additionally high dynamic operating loads. This was impressively observed with the Growian project, what was a two bladed 3MW onshore turbine, what failed in 1983 for this reason.

=== Calculation methods ===
FEM methods are mainly used for the assessments. Only these more extensive tools allow to reflect the stress curves in detail and to provide accuracy as it is required for the design. The calculation times have been considerably reduced by scripted modelling and increasing computing speeds, which increased the iterations speeds and thus improved the optimization results.

== Summary and outlook ==
The Tripod foundation for offshore wind turbines represents the beginning of the industrial utilisation of offshore wind energy in German waters. 126 turbines founded on top of Tripods are nowadays operational.

A desk top study has been performed in 2014 assessing the feasibility of the foundation concept to the next turbine generation with 8MW and rotor diameter beyond 160m. It was essential to demonstrate the limited weight increase carrying the even higher loads and thus approving all the existing fabrication and installation processes from the projects done before.

Today the knowledge in offshore engineering from the Tripod decade is an immaterial asset to be put into new projects using Monopile, Jacket or Tripod concepts, exploring the recent actions for lowering the cost of energy.
