= Vindeby Offshore Wind Farm =

First offshore wind farm in the world

- Country: Denmark
- Coordinates: 54°58′12″N 11°7′48″E
- Status: Decommissioned
- Commission date: 1991
- Decommission date: 2017
- Construction cost: 75 million Danish kroner
- Owner: Ørsted

Wind farm
- Type: Offshore
- Max. water depth: 4 m (13 ft)
- Distance from shore: 2 km (1 mi)
- Hub height: 35
- Rotor diameter: 35

Power generation
- Units operational: 11 x 450 kW
- Make and model: Bonus
- Nameplate capacity: 4.95 MW
- Capacity factor: 22.1%
- Annual net output: 9.61 GW·h (lifetime average)

External links
- Commons: Related media on Commons

Vindeby Offshore Wind Farm was the first offshore wind farm in the world, erected in 1991 off the coast of the town of Vindeby on the Danish island of Lolland. It was decommissioned for cost reasons in 2017 after 25 years of useful life.

Wind turbine locations

== History ==
Elkraft, one of the predecessors of DONG Energy (now Ørsted), began considering offshore turbines in 1987, and surveyed the waters around Lolland in 1989.

The wind farm started operation in 1991 and cost an estimated €10 million, built by SEAS and Elkraft. The 11 turbines were erected in 11 days. The electricity industry at the time generally considered offshore turbines to be ludicrous, as they must operate in salty conditions and have much smaller output than central power plants. The skeptical attitude had changed 6 years later, as offshore winds drove more energy production than those on land.

A single wind turbine had been erected in Swedish waters earlier, but Vindeby was the first collection of turbines, making it the first offshore wind farm. Four years later, the similar sized Tunø Knob wind farm was made. Tests were done to learn what to do and what not to do. Experience from Vindeby contributed to the development of cheaper ways to extract power from offshore winds.

The original government concession was for 25 years, from 1991 to 2016. In 2016, DONG Energy first considered shutting down the wind farm, as it was well past its design life and had become uneconomical. Vindeby was the first in a long line of successful wind farms which led a downwards cost trend. Vindeby was the first wind farm to be decommissioned by Dong Energy, which was completed in September 2017. In 25 years, Vindeby had produced a total of 243 GWh.

=== Technology ===
The developers contracted Bonus Energy to supply 11 wind turbines (450 kW each) for the project, placed in shallow waters. The annual power was equivalent to 2-3,000 Danish households. The turbines were modified for offshore use by sealing the towers and controlling the humidity inside with air conditioning, extending the life of the machinery.

The area was also used for a wave plant in 2010.

=== Recycling and waste management ===
When the Vindeby Offshore Wind Farm was taken down in 2017, most of the components were recycled into new use, particularly metals and concrete. Most of the 33 wind turbine blades (1.2 tonnes each, 39 tonnes total) were sent to various organisations for further use. Most were examined by Risø, some were re-acquired by their manufacturer LM Wind Power or displayed at museums, and some were recycled into noise barriers. However, 1.1 tonne of the fiberglass from the hub ended as cut up at the Rærup Controlled Landfill near Aalborg, even though it is not an environmentally friendly way of handling waste.

One turbine was set up as static display at the Energy Museum near Bjerringbro in 2023.

== See also ==
- Windmill
- Wind power in Denmark
- List of offshore wind farms in Denmark
- List of offshore wind farms
