= Siemens Gamesa =

Wind energy company

Siemens Gamesa Renewable Energy, S.A.
- Type: Sociedad Anónima
- Industry: Engineering
- Predecessors: Gamesa Corporación Tecnológica S.A. Siemens Wind Power
- Founded: 28 January 1976; 50 years ago
- Headquarters: Zamudio, Biscay, Spain
- Key people: Vinod Philip (executive vice president, Wind Power; member of the executive board of Siemens Energy AG)
- Products: Wind turbines
- Revenue: 4,611,983,000 (2016)
- Operating income: 477,377,000 (2016)
- Net income: 302,396,000 (2016)
- Total assets: 5,895,083,000 (2016)
- Owners: Siemens Energy AG
- Number of employees: ▲32,500 (2024)
- Parent: Siemens Energy AG
- Divisions: Onshore; Offshore; Service
- Subsidiaries: Gamesa Gearbox; Gamesa Electric; Adwen
- Website: www.siemensgamesa.com

Siemens Gamesa Renewable Energy, S.A. is a Spanish-German wind engineering company based in Zamudio, Biscay, Spain. It was formed in 2017 from a merger of Siemens Wind Power division with Gamesa Corporación Tecnológica, S.A. The company has two other main sites in Spain: one in Madrid and the other in Sarriguren. Other than its headquarters, its onshore business is primarily based in Spain, while the offshore business is based in Germany and Denmark. As of 2025, it is the twelfth largest wind turbine manufacturer in the world and the second largest in Europe behind Vestas.

The company is notable for its SG 14.0-222 wind turbine, the largest variant based on the Siemens D7 platform, as well as being one of the largest wind turbines in the world. This turbine model is currently contracted to be installed in 14 projects globally, notably in Taiwan, the United Kingdom and the United States. Siemens Gamesa's main competition is the General Electric Haliade-X and the Vestas V236.

== History ==
=== Gamesa Corporación Tecnológica ===
Gamesa began operations in 1976 as Grupo Auxiliar Metalúrgico S.A., focused at that time on developing new technologies and applying them to emerging activities. These included robotics, microelectronics, aeronautics and the development of composite materials. It was founded by Juan Luis Arregui and Joseba Mikel Grajales.

In 1994, Gamesa Eólica was created as a subsidiary specializing in the manufacture of wind turbines. The company became involved in the development, construction and operations of wind farms in 1995 and completed its first wind farm the following year. Gamesa had a seven-year partnership with Vestas that ended in 2002.

The corporation was officially listed on the stock exchange on 31 October 2000 and joined the selective IBEX 35 on 24 April 2001. In 2002, Gamesa acquired gearbox manufacturer Echesa, generator manufacturer Cantarey, and converter manufacturer Enertrón.

Since 2006, the company has focused on technologies associated with sustainable energy, principally wind power. It has divested of its interests in aeronautics, which were sold off to form a new company known as Aernnova, and in services, which were sold off to form a new company known as Global Energy Services.

As part of the United Kingdom's move to expand its production of offshore wind energy production, Gamesa has committed to the expenditure of £133.7 million on a production factory and other facilities in the UK, and will also move its offshore wind division headquarters to London.

In January 2014, Gamesa and French nuclear manufacturer Areva announced a preliminary deal to create a joint venture Adwen in the offshore wind power business. In early 2015 Gamesa continued its expansion of UK services by acquiring B9 Energy.

In 2017, Areva sold its stake in Adwen to Gamesa, after the merger of Gamesa and Siemens Wind Power was announced.

=== Siemens Wind Power ===
History of Siemens Wind Power A/S started in 1980, when Danish irrigation system manufacturer Danregn diversified into the wind turbine business. Its first wind turbines were machines with rotor diameters of around 10 m (33 ft) with generator powers of 20 to 30 kW (27 to 40 hp). In 1981, the wind activities were separated into newly established company Danregn Vindkraft A/S, established by Peter Stubkjær Sørensen and Egon Kristensen in Brande, Denmark, with a capital of 300,000 kroner; the company's product was a 55 kW (74 hp), 15 m (49 ft) blade diameter turbine.

The company changed its name from Danregn Vindkraft to Bonus Energy in 1983, an easier name for the English speaking North American market.

In 1991, eleven 450 kW Bonus turbines were installed in the Vindeby Offshore Wind Farm, the first offshore wind farm in the world.

The company sourced its first blades from Viborg based company Økær Vind Energi. Later it sourced blades from LM Wind Power. In the late 1990s Bonus began to develop its own blades, beginning production in the early 2000s in Aalborg. (Note: The blade factory in Aalborg was established in part due to local experience in construction with fibreglass, as used at the Danyard Aalborg shipyard in construction of the Flyvefisken class patrol vessel.)

Bonus A/S was sold to Siemens AG in 2004. The sales and project management headquarters moved to Hamburg, Germany in May 2009.

In 2006, Siemens acquired a former LM Glasfiber wind turbine blade factory in Engesvang, Denmark. In 2007, it constructed a blade factory in Fort Madison, Iowa, United States. A hub factory in Ølgod began production in 2008. A nacelle manufacturing plant was opened in Hutchinson, Kansas in December 2010. Additionally Bonus Energy sales and service partner company AN Windenergie GmbH in Bremen (Germany) was acquired in 2005.

In mid-2008 the company began testing of development prototypes of direct drive wind turbines; units based on the geared SWT-3.6–107 were installed in 2008 with a permanent magnet generator directly replacing the gearbox and alternator; (Note: The quantity of permanent magnet material used in the generator has been estimated at around 2 tonnes.) Successful tests led to development of a new production design by 2009. A prototype of the new direct drive design, an IEC 61400 wind class IA, 3 MW machine (SWT 3.0–101 DD) was installed near Brande, Denmark in 2009. The 3 MW design was launched as a product in April 2010 and significantly reduced complexity (half the components) and lower nacelle weight than earlier 2.3 MW designs. A 2.3 MW version for lower wind speeds (SWT-2.3–113) was launched in 2011.

In 2010, Siemens Wind Power acquired 49% of A2SEA (an offshore wind farm installation company) from DONG Energy (now Ørsted A/S). In 2017, A2SEA was sold to GeoSea.

A factory established in Linggang (Siemens Wind Power Blades (Shanghai) Co., Ltd.) near the Yangshan Deep Water Port began production in 2010. Additionally, in December 2010, Siemens announced it would install a blade factory at an existing unused facility in Tillsonburg, Ontario, Canada. In early 2011 Siemens and ABP announced the development of a £210 million turbine assembly plant, and dock development at Alexandra Dock, in Kingston upon Hull, UK.

In May 2011, testing began of a prototype 6 MW direct drive design with a 120 to 154 m (394 to 505 ft) rotor; the design was launched as a product in November 2011. In 2013, Siemens announced a development of its 3.6 MW design, the SWT 4.0–130 which used a rotor of diameter 130m with 4 MW rated power. At the same time the company introduced new product platform codes for its products, with 'G' indicating geared drive, and 'D' indicating direct drive, suffixed by a number indicating an approximate power class. The four initial product ranges were Siemens G2, G4, D3 and D6.

In July 2012, the company agreed to supply DONG Energy with 300 direct drive, 75m blade, 6 MW SWT-6.0–154 turbines for the English offshore market from 2014. Two turbines are to be installed for testing at the Gunfleet Sands offshore wind farm. The value of the contract was estimated at over £2 billion. Prototype 6 MW machines were installed at the Gunfleet Sands 2 wind farm in 2013; with the first full scale commercial installation of 6 MW machines at the 210 MW Westernmost Rough wind farm in 2014. In September 2012 Siemens Wind announced the lay off of 615 of a workforce of around 1650 workers in the United States, citing reduced demand for wind turbines due to uncertainty concerning future tax break incentives in the US for wind power. (see United States Wind Energy Policy.)

In March 2014 Siemens and Associated British Ports (ABP) finalised the 2011 MOU to build a turbine factory in Hull, UK (Green Port Hull), and announced an additional facility near Paull, East Riding of Yorkshire, east of Hull which would manufacture rotor blades for turbines. In 2014 the planned factory at Paull was abandoned, with all production to be concentrated at the Alexandra dock site. Revised plans for the site submitted April 2015 included only a blade manufacturing factory at the site with no nacelle production.

In 2015 Siemens upgraded its 6 MW offshore design to a rated 7 MW power with a larger permanent magnet generator, and further to 8 MW in 2016. The first order for the 7 MW design was awarded in October 2015 for 47 turbines in the Walney 3 offshore.

In early 2015, Siemens announced it had reached agreements to build 2 GW of wind turbines in Egypt, and to construct a blade factory in that country, as part of a larger power generation agreement. The €8 billion, 16.4 GW energy development deal was signed in June 2015, including an approximate 1000 worker blade factory in Ain Soukhna and 12 wind farms (600 turbine, 2 GW) in the Gulf of Suez and west Nile areas of Egypt.

In August 2015, Siemens announced it would construct a new nacelle manufacturing plant at Cuxhaven, Germany, an investment of £200 million. The plant was expected to become operational in mid-2017, and employ 1000 people. A€100 million blade plant to be built in the Tanger Automotive City (near Tanger-Med port) in Morocco was announced in early 2016.

In February 2017, Siemens announced the closure of the Engesvang blade factory (Denmark), with the loss of 430 jobs, citing the plants inability to produce larger size blades.

=== Merger ===
On 17 July 2016 Siemens and Gamesa announced their plan to merge their wind businesses, with the 59% stake of Siemens and the 41% stake of former Gamesa shareholders in the resulting company. Siemens paid €1 billion cash for its stake in Gamesa. The resultant company was headquartered in Spain, with an offshore operations headquartered in Hamburg, Germany and Vejle, Denmark. The combined business was the largest wind turbine manufacturer worldwide by installed capacity (~69 GW). The merger became effective on 3 April 2017.

=== Post-merger ===
In 2018, Siemens Gamesa won the wind turbine supply contract for the largest offshore wind farm in the world. It is a project of the Danish group Ørsted located in English waters, specifically 89 kilometers from the east of the coast, in which it will also carry out maintenance, and will install its SG 8.0-167 DD model turbines, with a total capacity of 1,386 MW. In the company's history, it is the largest project, ahead of Hornsea One (1,218 MW), also developed by Ørsted.

In 2018, Taiwanese manufacturer Swancor began supplying wind turbine resin to Siemens Gamesa.

In 2019, Siemens Gamesa agreed to purchase Senvion's European service fleet for €200 million ($222 million). On 18 May 2021, the CNMV suspended Siemens Gamesa shares from trading due to informations about a possible future delisting. The suspension was lifted a day later.

In 2022, Siemens Gamesa began partnering with Taiwan-based green material producer Swancor Holding Co., and signed an agreement to install 3GW of offshore wind power in Taiwan.

In 2023, the company suffered a quality crisis after a technical review at Gamesa revealed faulty components in 15 to 30% of its turbine models, creating replacement costs of over €1 billion. As a result, the company reported a deficit of €4.4 billion in the 2023 fiscal year, losing investors' and banks' support and prompting the German government to intervene with a €7.5 billion bailout in November 2023. In 2024, the 163 MW Odal Vind onshore wind farm in Norway had to be partially shut down due to manufacturing defects in the blades that Siemens Gamesa had supplied.

In December 2025, it was announced Siemens Gamesa had finalised the sale of its Gamesa Electric power electronics division in Spain to the Swedish-Swiss multinational electrical engineering corporation, ABB, completing a transaction first revealed in December 2024. The divestment included the business’s wind converter, energy storage, and solar inverter product lines. Financial terms were not disclosed.

== Products ==
=== Onshore turbines ===
Product name	Power rating (MW)	Rotor diameter (m)	Notes
SG 2.1-114	2.1	114	Discontinued
SG 2.1-122	2.1	122	Discontinued
SG 2.2-122	2.2	122	Discontinued
SG 2.6-114	2.625	114	Discontinued
SG 2.6-126	2.625	126	Discontinued
SG 2.7-129	2.75	129	Discontinued
SG 2.9-129	2.9	129	Only in North America
SG 3.4-132	3.465	132	Only in France
SG 3.4-145	3.465	145	Discontinued
SWT-DD-120	3.9 - 4.3	120	Only in Japan
SWT-DD-130	3.9 - 4.3	130	Only in Japan
SWT-DD-142	3.5 - 4.1	142	Discontinued
SWT-3.2-113	3.2	113	Discontinued
SWT-3.4-108	3.4	108	Discontinued
SG 4.5-145	4.5	145	Discontinued
SG 5.0-132	5.0	132	
SG 5.0-145	5.0	145	
SG 6.6-155	6.6	155	
SG 6.6-170	6.6	170	

=== Offshore turbines ===
Product name	Power rating (MW)	Rotor diameter (m)	Notes
SWT-4.0-120	4.0	120	Discontinued
SWT-4.0-130	4.0	130	Discontinued
SWT-6.0-154	6.0	154	First prototype installed May 2011
SWT-7.0-154	7.0	154	
SG 8.0-167 DD	8.0	167	
SG 11.0-200 DD	11.0	200	Commercially available as of 2023
SG-14-222 DD	14.0	222	In development, serial production is expected for 2024. It is estimated that the turbine may be able to reach 15MW, using power boost.
SG-14-236 DD	14.0	236	In March 2023 a prototype was producing power. Serial production is expected for 2024. It is estimated that the turbine may be able to reach 15MW, using power boost.
SG-11.0-193 DD	11.0	193	Commercially available as of 2022
SG-10.0-193 DD	10.0	193	
G132-5.0MW	5.0	132	1.5 mps cut-in speed

== Operations ==
Siemens Wind has R&D, and production facilities in Brande, Denmark. Blade production is located in Aveiro (Portugal), Aalborg (Denmark), Tanger Automotive City (Morocco), Linggang (China), Fort Madison, Iowa (USA) and Tillsonburg, Ontario (Canada); with factories under construction or planned (2016) for Kingston upon Hull (UK) and Ain Soukhna (Egypt). By 2018, the hub factory in Ølgod was moved to the production in Brande.

Other established production sites included nacelle manufacture at Hutchinson, Kansas (USA, 1.6 GW). As of 2018 the new offshore nacelle plant has been opened at Cuxhaven (Germany). Another offshore nacelle plant opened in Taiwan in 2021.

Siemens acquired the first of two roll-on/roll-off turbine transport ships in 2016, converted from a container ship, to reduce logistics costs. A telescopic roof also allows lift-on/lift-off with cranes.

== Recognition ==
Siemens Gamesa is listed on the Dow Jones Sustainability Index; the FTSE4Good Index, which is concerned with corporate social responsibility; the KLD Global Climate 100 Index; and the Global 100 Index of the 100 most sustainable companies in the world.

== See also ==
- Wind power in Spain
- Wind power in the United States
- Wind power in the European Union
- Wind power in China
- Wind power in the United Kingdom
- List of renewable energy companies by country
- List of wind turbine manufacturers
- REpower
