= Trianel Windpark Borkum =

Offshore wind farm in Germany

Borkum West II
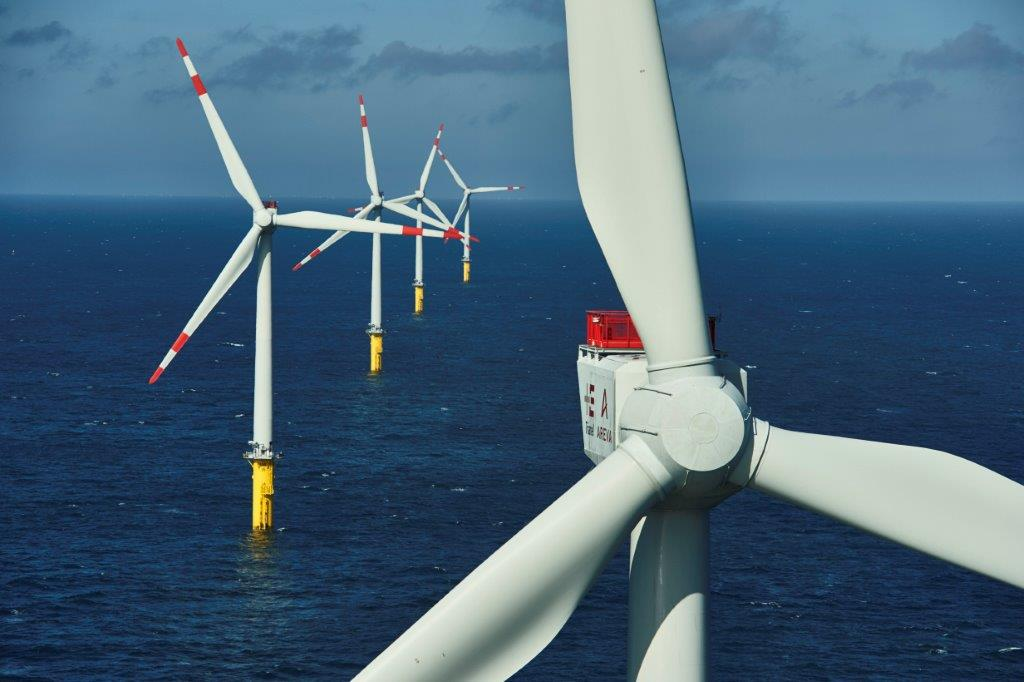
- Country: Germany
- Location: 45 km North of Borkum island
- Coordinates: 54°02′30″N 6°28′00″E
- Status: Operational
- Construction began: September 2011
- Commission date: July 2015
- Construction cost: EUR900m (Phase 1) ? (Phase 2)
- Owner: Trianel + 33 municipal utilities
- Operator: Trianel

Wind farm
- Type: offshore
- Max. water depth: 33 m
- Distance from shore: 45 km (65.6 km for center)
- Rotor diameter: 116 m

Power generation
- Units operational: 40 x 5 MW
- Make and model: Areva Wind M5000-116
- Units planned: 32 x 6.34 MW
- Nameplate capacity: 200 MW

External links
- Website: www.trianel-borkum.de/en/start.html

Wind farm layout

Trianel Windpark Borkum's location in the wind farms of the German Bight

Trianel Windpark Borkum (formerly Borkum West II) is an offshore wind farm near Borkum. Its first phase of 40 turbines rated at a total capacity of 200 MW is operational, with a planned, additional 200 MW in a second phase. The project was approved for construction in 2008 and will cost over €1 billion to construct once fully operational (€900m for phase I alone). Originally known as Borkum West II the name was changed to Trianel Windpark Borkum in early 2013.

Phase 1 of the installation was completed in the 4th quarter of 2014 and consist of 40 Areva M5000-116 turbines (5 MW turbines) on Tripod foundations. It was connected to the grid in August 2015. In the six months before March 2016 the wind farm produced 452.33 GWh, i.e. a capacity factor of 51.6%.

The power is delivered via the offshore converter station HVDC DolWin1 to the German onshore Dörpen West substation near Heede.

In September 2016 Senvion was awarded a conditional contract for the second phase, for 32 upgraded 6.2M152 turbines rated at a total capacity of 203 MW. A final investment decision was made in the first half of 2017 after which construction started in early 2018 for a planned completion in the fall of 2019. The wind farm was fully commissioned in 2020 after delays caused by the bankruptcy of Senvion, at a cost of €184/MWh.
