= Adwen (company) =

German offshore wind service company

Adwen GmbH
- Formerly: Multibrid GmbH; Areva Wind GmbH
- Company type: Subsidiary
- Industry: Engineering
- Founded: 2000
- Founders: Areva; Gamesa
- Defunct: 2017
- Fate: merged into Gamesa
- Successor: Siemens Gamesa
- Headquarters: Bremerhaven, Germany
- Key people: Carsten König (CEO); Michael Krause (CFO); Stephen Deehan (COO)
- Services: Offshore wind services
- Owner: Siemens Energy (via Siemens Gamesa)
- Number of employees: 480 (2018)
- Parent: Siemens Energy
- Website: www.siemensgamesa.com

Adwen GmbH (now Siemens Gamesa Renewable Energy Deutschland GmbH) is an offshore wind service company headquartered in Bremerhaven, Germany. It is a wholly owned subsidiary of Spanish-German company Siemens Gamesa. Previously the company designed, assembled, and installed 5-Megawatt wind turbines for offshore wind farms. It also designed and manufactured rotor blades through its subsidiary Adwen Blades GmbH, headquartered in Stade, Germany.

== History ==
Adwen was established as Multibrid GmbH by Pfleiderer Wind Energy GmbH in 2000, after acquiring Multibrid turbine technology from aerodyn Energiesysteme GmbH. In 2003, Multibrid was bought by Prokon Nord Energiesysteme GmbH. In 2007, Multibrid opened a wind turbine assembly plant in Bremerhaven. At the same year, Prokon Nord established a blade manufacturer PN Rotor GmbH.

The French nuclear corporation Areva invested in Multibrid in 2007, buying 51% of the company's shares for €150 million. In 2009, Areva acquired PN Rotor, which became Areva Blades. Areva bought the remaining 49% of shares of Multibrid in 2010. Correspondingly, the company was renamed Areva Wind GmbH.

The first prototype was installed in 2004. Three additional onshore turbines were installed in 2008 in order to develop expertise with tripods, large hub heights, erection, lifting equipment, logistics and serial manufacturing. In 2009, Multibrid installed six wind turbines at the Alpha Ventus Offshore Wind Farm. In 2009, Areva Wind was selected as a turbine supplier for the Global Tech 1 offshore wind farm, in 2010 for the Borkum West II offshore wind farm and in 2012 for the Wikinger offshore wind farm.

In 2014, Areva and Gamesa Corporación Tecnológica started negotiations to create a joint venture for the offshore wind energy. The equally owned joint venture named Adwen was formed in 2015 and it was created on the basis of Areva Wind, including Areva's M5000-135 turbine and 8 MW turbine platform under development. Gamesa contributed its G132-5.0 MW Offshore turbine technology. In 2017, Areva sold its stake in Adwen to Gamesa, after the merger of Gamesa and Siemens Wind Power was announced.

In 2017, Siemens Gamesa announced a restructuring plan for Adwen, to be completed by September 2020. Manufacturing of wind turbines by Adwen was discontinued and Adwen focused on servicing installed turbines. Plants in Bremen and Emden would be closed and the number of employees in Germany would be reduced from 480 to 211.

== Operations ==
Adwen had plants in Bremerhaven, Bremen and Emden in Germany, and it planned to build manufacturing or assembling plants in other markets, particularly in Le Havre in France. However, due to restructuring the only plant which would remain is the plant in Bremerhaven, which would support the offshore services.

Adwen provided two different 5 MW offshore turbines: AD 5-135 (formerly Areva M5000-135) for the Wikinger Project and AD 5-116 for the North Sea Projects GlobalTech One, Borkum West II and Alpha Ventus. In addition, it has developed 8 MW AD 8-180 turbine prototype, which has the world largest wind turbine gearbox, developed jointly with the wind energy engineering company Winergy. Due to the restructuring, the Adwen's AD 8-180 project was discontinued and Siemens Gamesa replaced it with its SWT 8MW turbine model.

Adwen has provided wind turbines for Alpha Ventus (6 x 5 MW), Trianel (former Borkum West II, 40 x 5 MW), Global Tech I (80 x 5 MW), and Wikinger (80 x 5 MW) offshore wind farms, all located in the German waters.
