= Alpha Ventus Offshore Wind Farm =

German offshore wind farm in the North Sea

Alpha Ventus
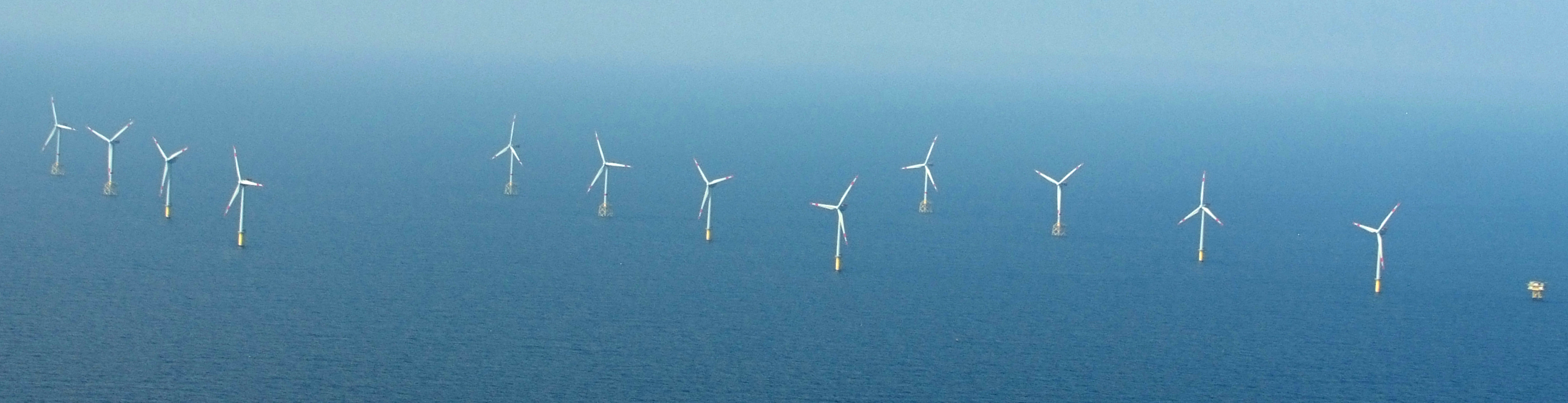
- Aerial view of Alpha Ventus wind park (May 2012)
- Country: Germany
- Coordinates: 54°00′40″N 6°36′28″E
- Status: Operational
- Commission date: 2009
- Owners: EWE AG; RWE AG; Vattenfall

Wind farm
- Type: Offshore
- Rotor diameter: 126 m (413 ft)

Power generation
- Units operational: 12 × 5 MW
- Make and model: Adwen Adwen AD 5-116 (6); Senvion REpower 5M (6)
- Nameplate capacity: 60 MW
- Capacity factor: 50 - 55% (2011 & 2012)

External links
- Website: www.alpha-ventus.de
- Commons: Related media on Commons

Wind farm layout

Alpha Ventus' location in the wind farms of the German Bight

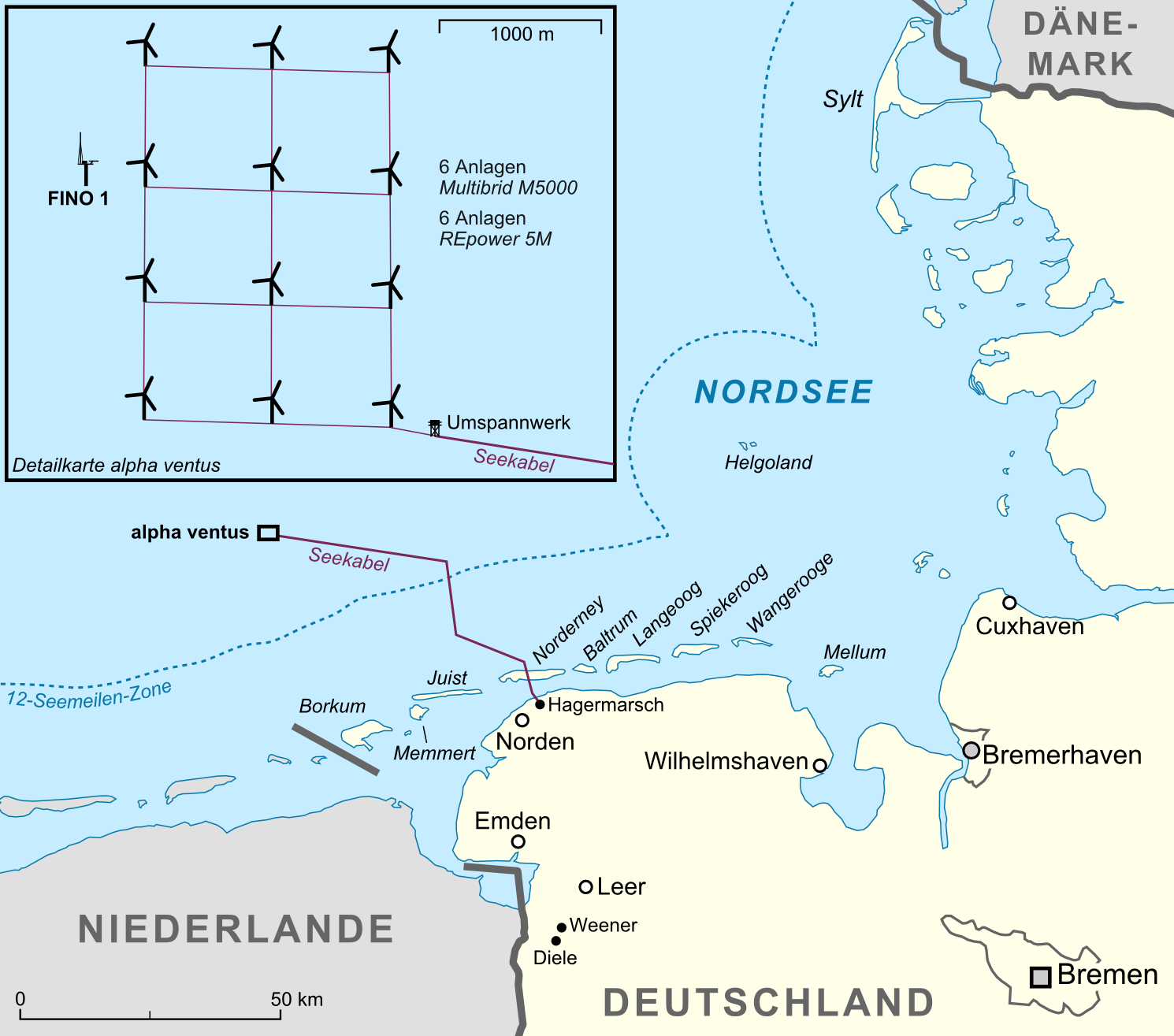
Alternative map of Alpha Ventus' location, with wind park layout included

Alpha Ventus Offshore Wind Park (formerly known as Borkum West Offshore Wind Park) is Germany’s first offshore wind farm. It is situated in the North Sea, 45 kilometres (28 mi) north of the island of Borkum.

== History ==
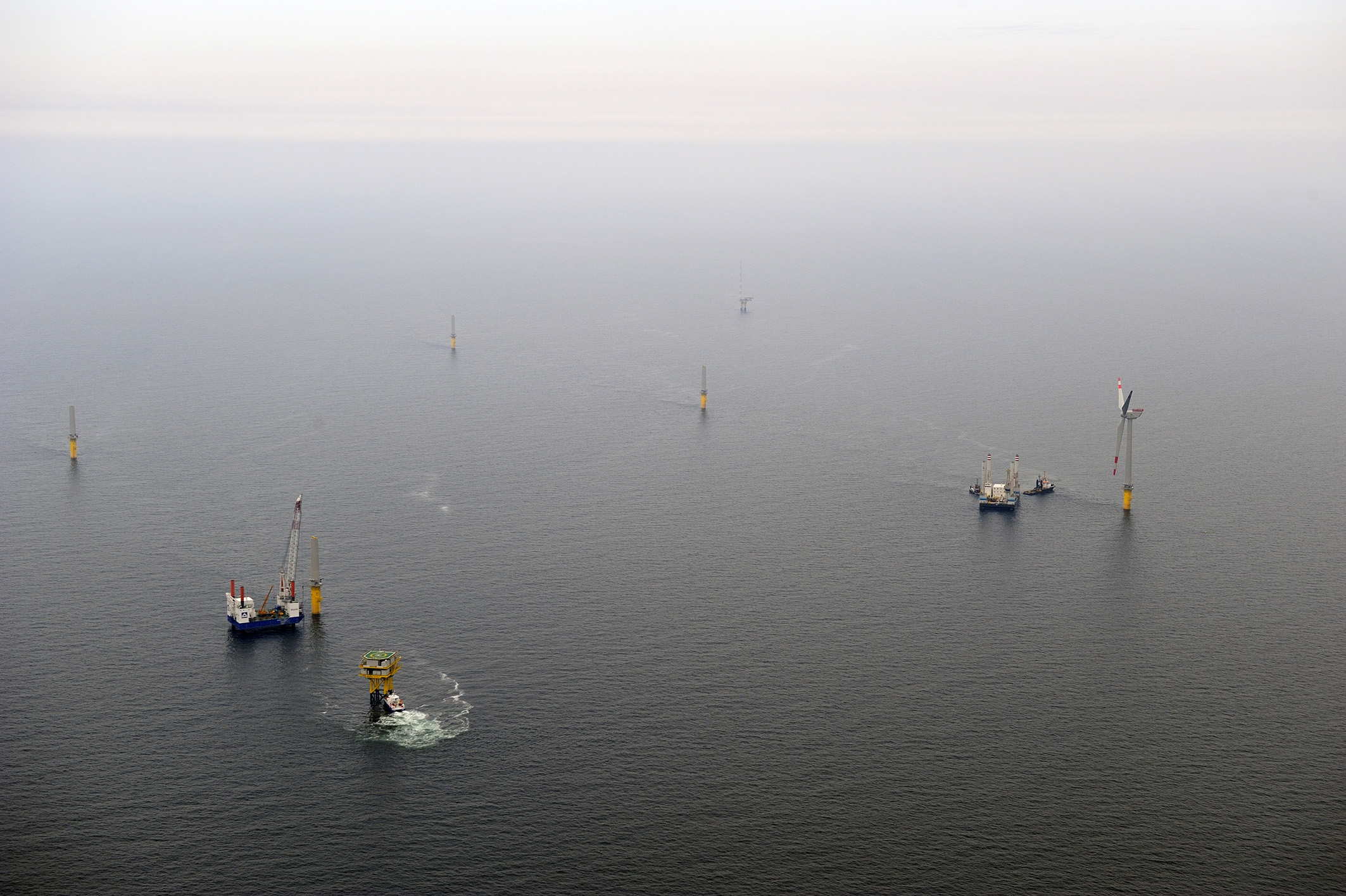
Construction work at Alpha Ventus wind park (July 2009)

The application for construction of the wind farm near Borkum was submitted in 1999. The permit was given by the Federal Maritime and Hydrographic Agency in 2001. In 2007, contracts for supplying wind turbines were signed with REpower and Multibrid (later: Areva Wind and Adwen). That same year, a contract for the construction of a subsea cable connection to the German grid was signed. Construction of the alpha ventus substation started in July 2008. On 15 July 2009 the first wind turbine was installed and the first six turbines delivered by Multibrid went operational in August 2009. Installation of another six turbines delivered by REpower started in September 2009. The foundations for the Multibrid turbines were so called tripods designed by OWT. The foundations for the REpower turbines were developed and designed by OWEC Tower. Construction of the wind farm was completed on 16 November 2009 after a seven-month construction period. On 27 April 2010 the farm was officially opened and set into commercial operation.

== Description ==
The wind farm is owned by Deutsche Offshore-Testfeld und Infrastruktur-GmbH & Co. KG (DOTI), a joint venture of EWE (47.5%), E.ON (26.25%), and Vattenfall (26.25%). It consists of twelve turbines, all with capacity of five megawatts. There are six Adwen AD 5-116 (former Areva Multibrid (M5000)) turbines and six REpower 5M turbines. Turbines stand in 30 m of water and are not visible from land, however they are barely visible from Norderney's lighthouse, and easily from the island of Borkum. The REpower turbines are installed onto jacket foundations (OWEC Jacket Quattropods) by the crane ship Thialf and Adwen turbines are installed onto tripod-style foundations by the jack-up barge Odin. In May 2010, two Multibrid generators went off service due severe overheating in their gearboxes.

Due to delays, the cost of the project grew from 190 million to 250 million euro (US$270 to $357 million), or 4200 €/kW (6000 $/kW).

In 2011, the wind farm had the highest registered capacity factor of 50.8% of most European offshore wind farms. This was exceeded in 2012 with a capacity factor of 55%, a global record. The project team noted that the expected capacity factor of 42% was a considerable underestimation. However, in 2013 the capacity factor was 42.7%. This is likely due to other wind parks nearby being built, since wind turbines slow down the wind slightly. The facility was scheduled for decommissioning around 2028, but operation will continue after DOTI has sold the windfarm to Ocean Breeze Energy.

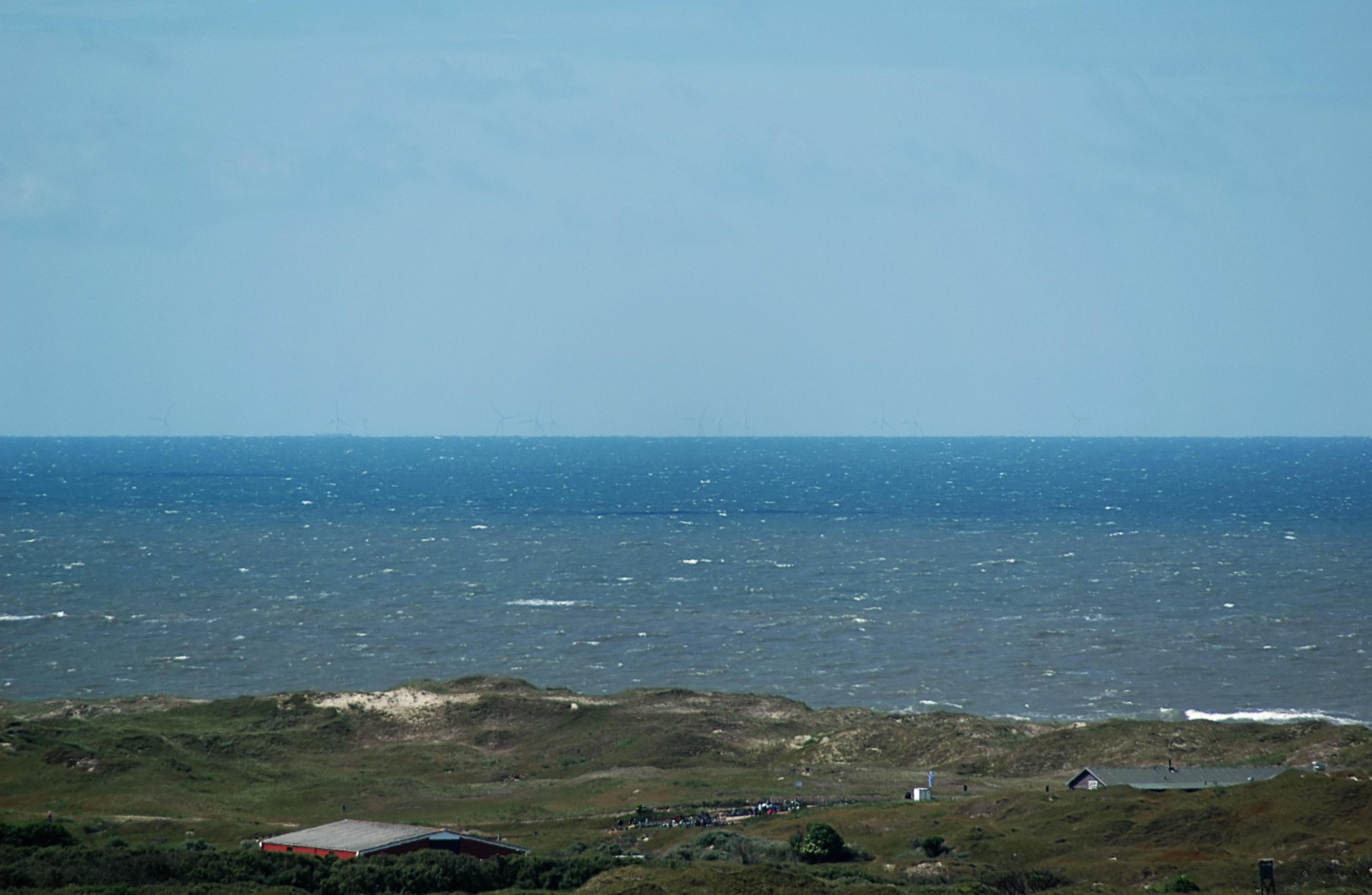
Alpha Ventus Offshore Wind Park as seen from the Norderney lighthouse

== Research ==
Because it is the first offshore wind farm in Germany, Alpha Ventus is accompanied by several research projects sponsored by the Federal Ministry for Environment (BMU). In 2003, the research platform FINO 1 was built approximately 400 m to the west of the wind farm. Research interests include:

- investigation of the flow conditions in the wind farm
- measurement of wind and wave load
- further development and adaptation of wind turbine components to offshore conditions
- accompanying ecological research
- development of new wind farm control systems
- logistic problems and the grid integration of offshore wind farms
- Power curve test methodology
- Investigation of wind turbine wakes
- Assessment of the wind turbine induction zone

== See also ==
- Wind power in Germany
