= List of offshore wind farms in Denmark =

Locations of offshore wind farms in Danish waters

This is a list of operational, offshore wind farms in Denmark (within the national maritime boundaries). Denmark's wind power generation is the highest in the world as a fraction of domestic consumption, reaching 47% in 2019.

Data is primarily from the 4C Offshore's Global Offshore Wind Farm Map and Database. Tariff data is supplied by the Danish Energy Agency. The name of the wind farm is the name used by the energy company when referring to the farm, and is usually related to a shoal or the name of the nearest town on shore. The "wind farm" part of the name is implied and hence omitted for ease of reading.

== Current farms ==
Wind farm	Location	Capacity (MW)	Turbines	Commissioning	Build cost	Cap. fac.	Depth range (m)	km to shore	Owner	Refs.
Kriegers Flak	55°01′00″N 12°56′00″E	604.8	72 x Siemens Gamesa SWT-8.4-167	2021	0.372 DKK/kWh		15-30	25	Vattenfall	
Horns Rev III	55°42′00″N 7°41′20″E	406.7	49 x MHIVestas V164-8.3MW	2019	€1bn		10-20	30	Vattenfall	(Note: Horns Rev III)
Anholt	56°36′00″N 11°12′36″E	400	111 × Siemens SWP 3.6-120	2013	DKK10b	46.7%	15-19	23	Ørsted, others	(Note: Newsletter-May2013)
Vesterhav	56.38°N 8°E	344	41 x Siemens SG 8.4MW	2024	€769m, 0.475 DKK/kWh		16 - 28	4 - 10	Vattenfall	
Horns Rev II	55°36′00″N 7°35′24″E	209	91 × Siemens SWP 2.3-93	2009	€470m	48.4%	9-17	32	Ørsted	(Note: Horns Rev II turbines)
Rødsand II	54°33′36″N 11°33′0″E	207	90 × Siemens SWP 2.3-93	2010	€400m	42.1%	6-12	9	E.ON	
Nysted (Rødsand I)	54°33′0″N 11°42′36″E	166	72 × Siemens SWP 2.3-82	2003	€248m	36.1%	6-9	11	Ørsted 50%, PensionDanmark 50%	(Note: Nysted offshore wind farm)
Horns Rev I	55°31′47″N 7°54′22″E	160	80 × Vestas V80-2MW	2002	€272m	39.9%	10-20	18	Vattenfall 60%, Ørsted 40%	(Note: Horns Rev 1 Horns Rev Offshore Wind Farm Vattenfall Horns Rev 1)
Middelgrunden wind farm	55°41′27″N 12°40′13″E	40	20 × Bonus/Siemens 2MW	2000	€47m	25.7%	3-6	4.7	50% private, 50% Ørsted	(Note: Middelgrunden Wind Turbine Cooperative Current turbine data)
Nissum Bredning Vind	56°40′12″N 8°14′38″E	28	4 x Siemens Gamesa SWT-7.0-154	2018	€40m	~35-40%	1-6	1.1	Jysk Energy A/S, Nissum Brednings Vindmøllelaug I/S	
Samsø	55°43′12″N 10°34′48″E	23	10 × Bonus/Siemens 2.3-82	2003	€30m	38.9%	10-13	4	Municipal, private	(Note: Samsø Sea Wind)
Sprogø	55°20′24″N 10°57′36″E	21	7 × Vestas V90-3MW	2009		36.5%	6-16	10	Great Belt Link	
Rønland 1	56°39′46″N 8°13′10″E	17.2	4 × Vestas V80-2MW, 4 × Bonus/Siemens 2.3-93	2003		44.1%	0-2	0.1	THV (Vestas), Dansk Vindenergi ApS (Bonus)	(Note: Rønland 1)
Avedøre Holme	55°36′0″N 12°27′30″E	10.8	3 × Siemens SWP3.6-120 VS	2009	€25m	29.2%	0-2	0.1	50% Ørsted, 50% private	(Note: DONG's Avedøre Holme Co-op)
Frederikshavn	57°26′40″N 10°33′40″E	7.6	Nordex N90 2.3 MW, Vestas V90-3MW, Bonus(Siemens) 82.4 2.3 MW	2003		29.3%	1-4	0.3	Ørsted	
Tunø Knob	55°58′10″N 10°21′20″E	5	10 × Vestas V39 500 kW	1995	£10m	29.7%	3-7	6	Ørsted	

Capacity factors are averaged over each wind farm's life.

== Future sites ==
The list is sorted by capacity, but it can be sorted in any way by clicking once or twice on the triangle symbols ( ^{Δ} ) at the top in each column.

Wind farm	Location	Capacity (MW)	Turbines	Commissioning	Build cost	Cap. fac.	Depth range (m)	km to shore	Owner	Refs.
Thor	56.33°N 8°E	1000		2027	DKK 15.5 B			20	RWE	

== Past sites ==
Wind farm	Location	Capacity (MW)	Turbines	Commissioning	Build cost	Cap. fac.	Depth range (m)	km to shore	Owner	Refs.
Vindeby	54°58′12″N 11°7′48″E	4.95	11 × Bonus 450 kW offshore	1991 (decommissioned 2017)	€10m	23.8%	2-4	1.8	Ørsted	

== Gallery ==
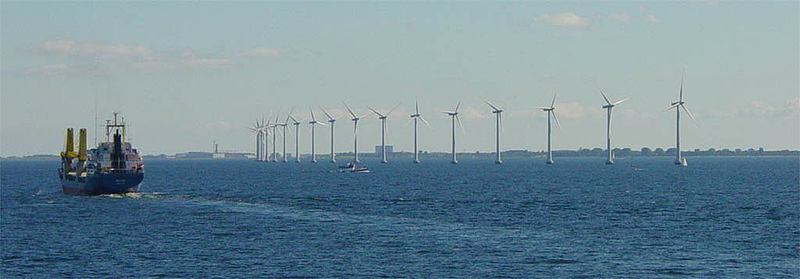
Middelgrunden turbines in Øresund

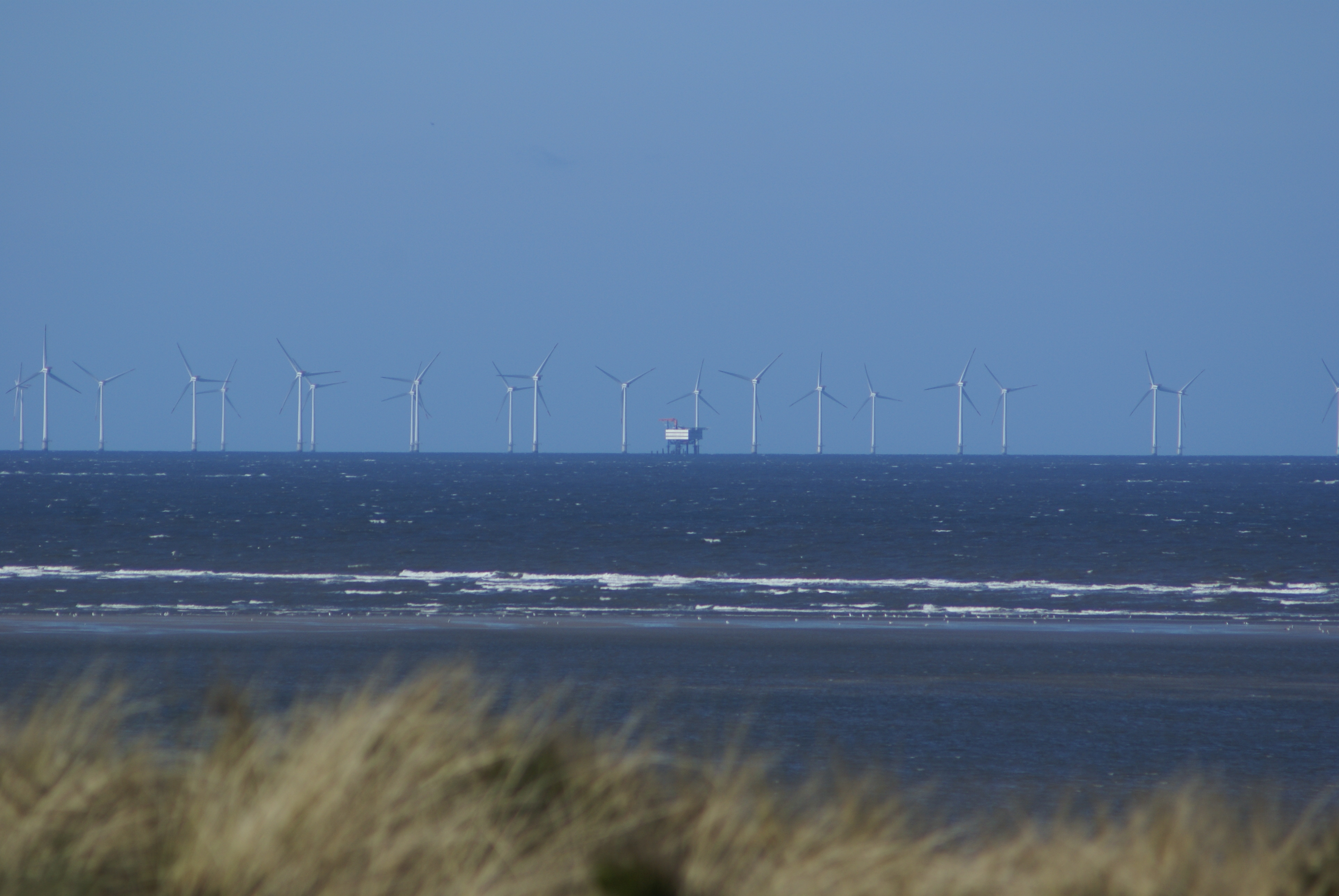
Horns Rev

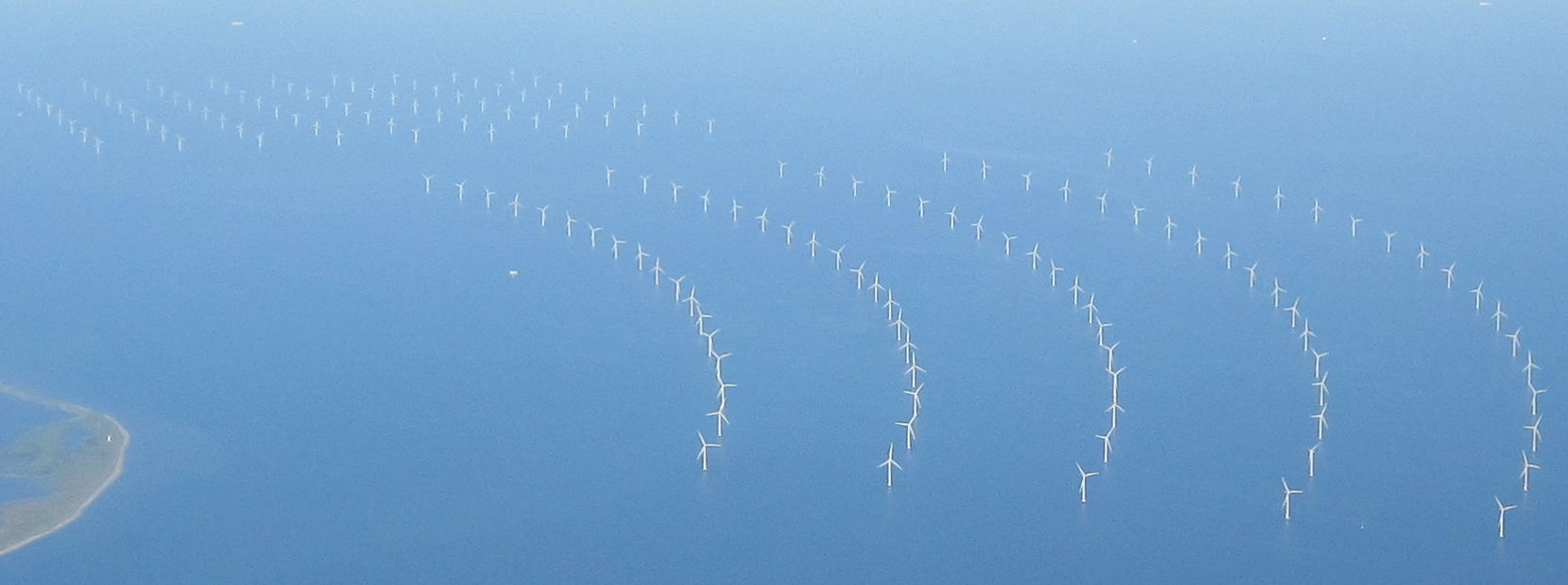
Rødsand

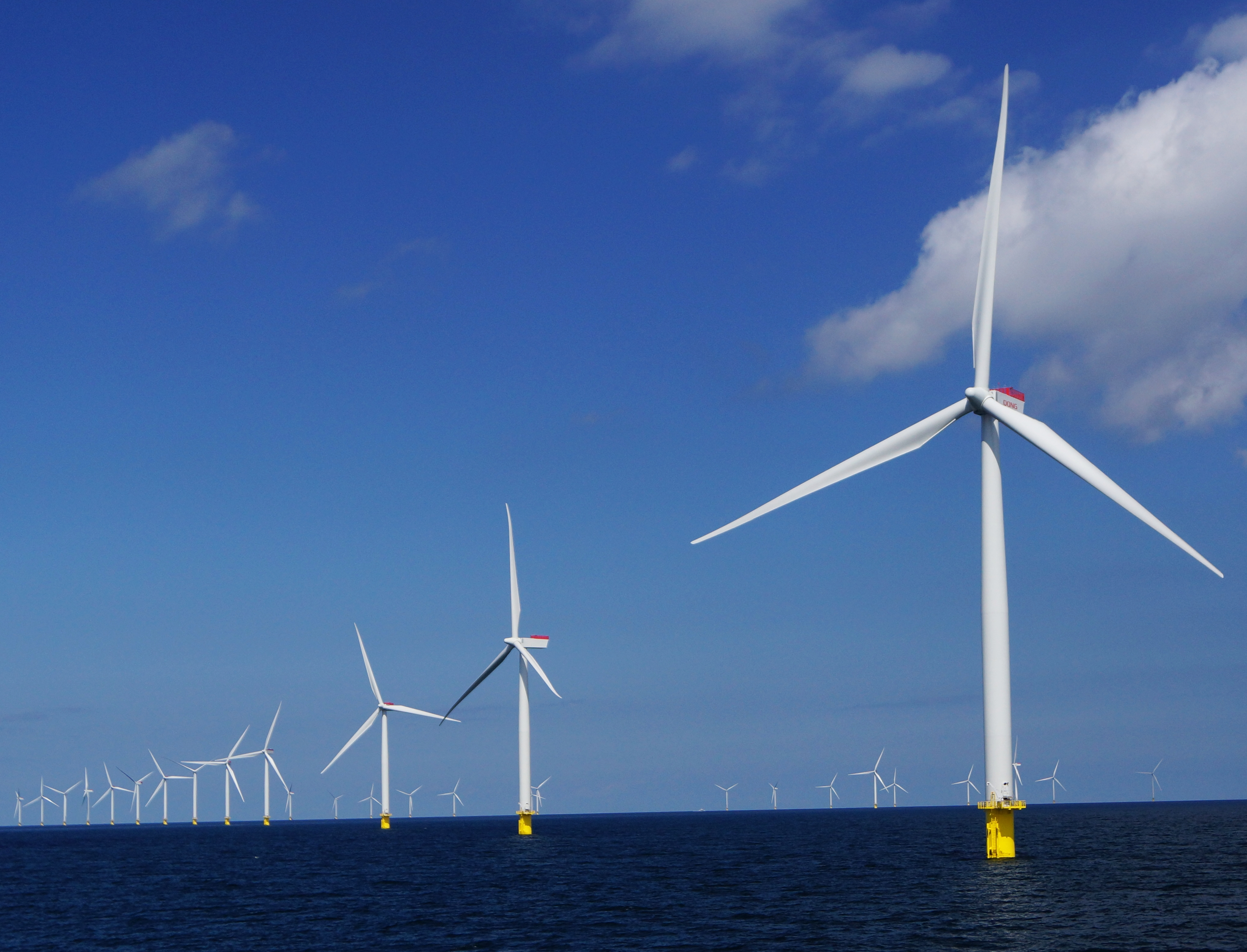
Anholt

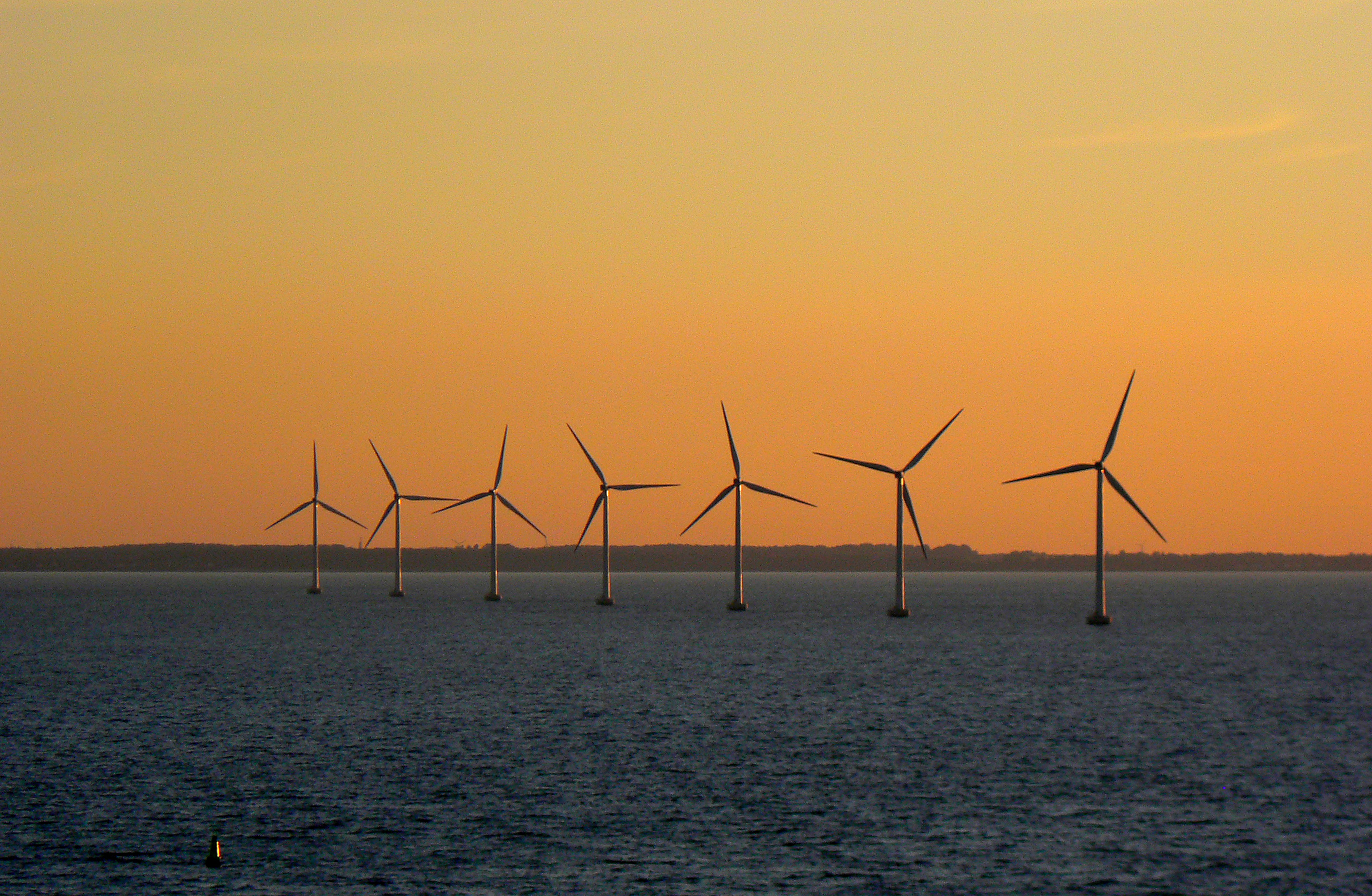
Sprogø

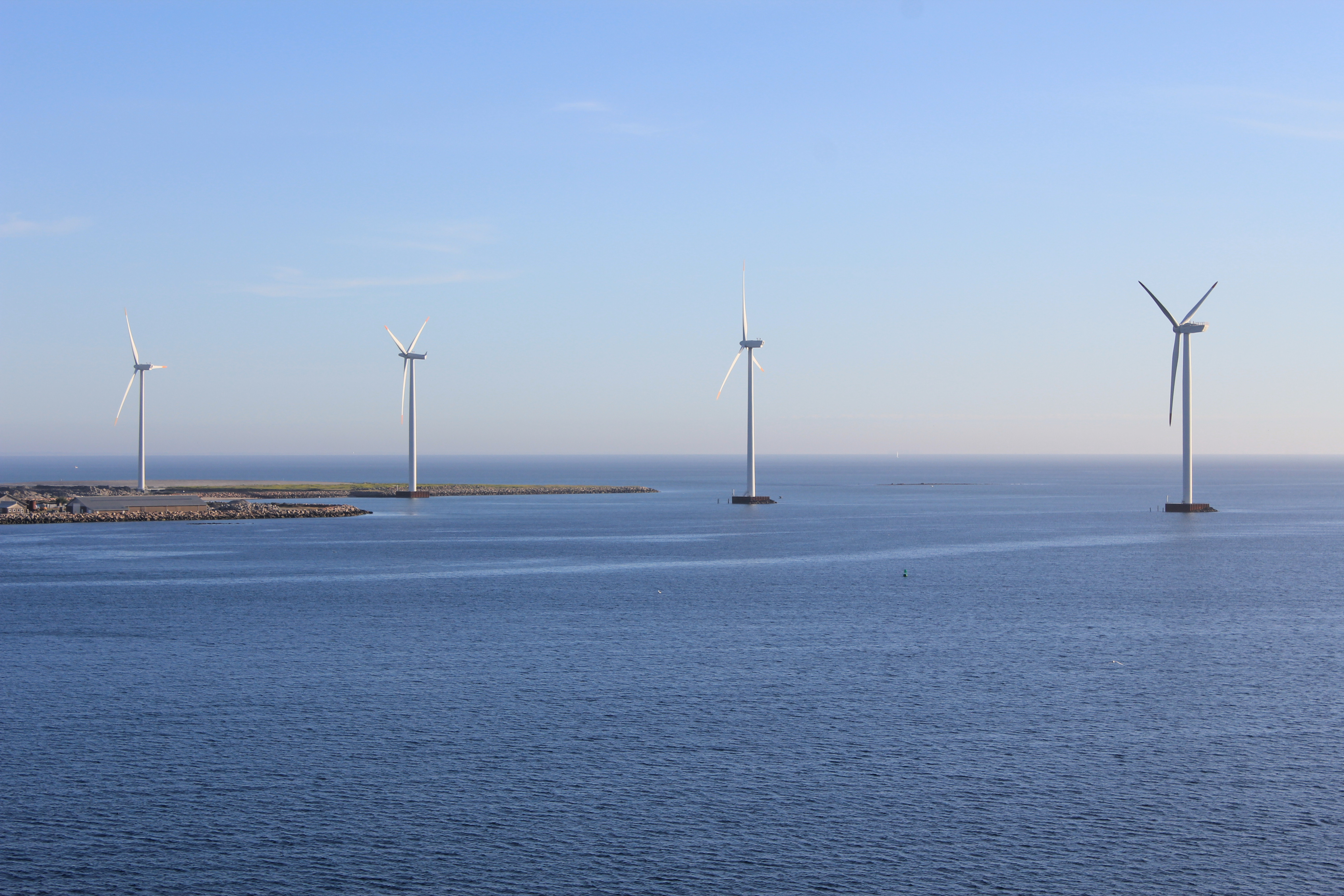
Frederikshavn

== See also ==
- Electricity sector in Denmark
- List of wind farms
- List of offshore wind farms
- Lists of offshore wind farms by country
- List of offshore wind farms in the North Sea
- List of offshore wind farms in the Baltic Sea
