= List of offshore wind farms in Sweden =

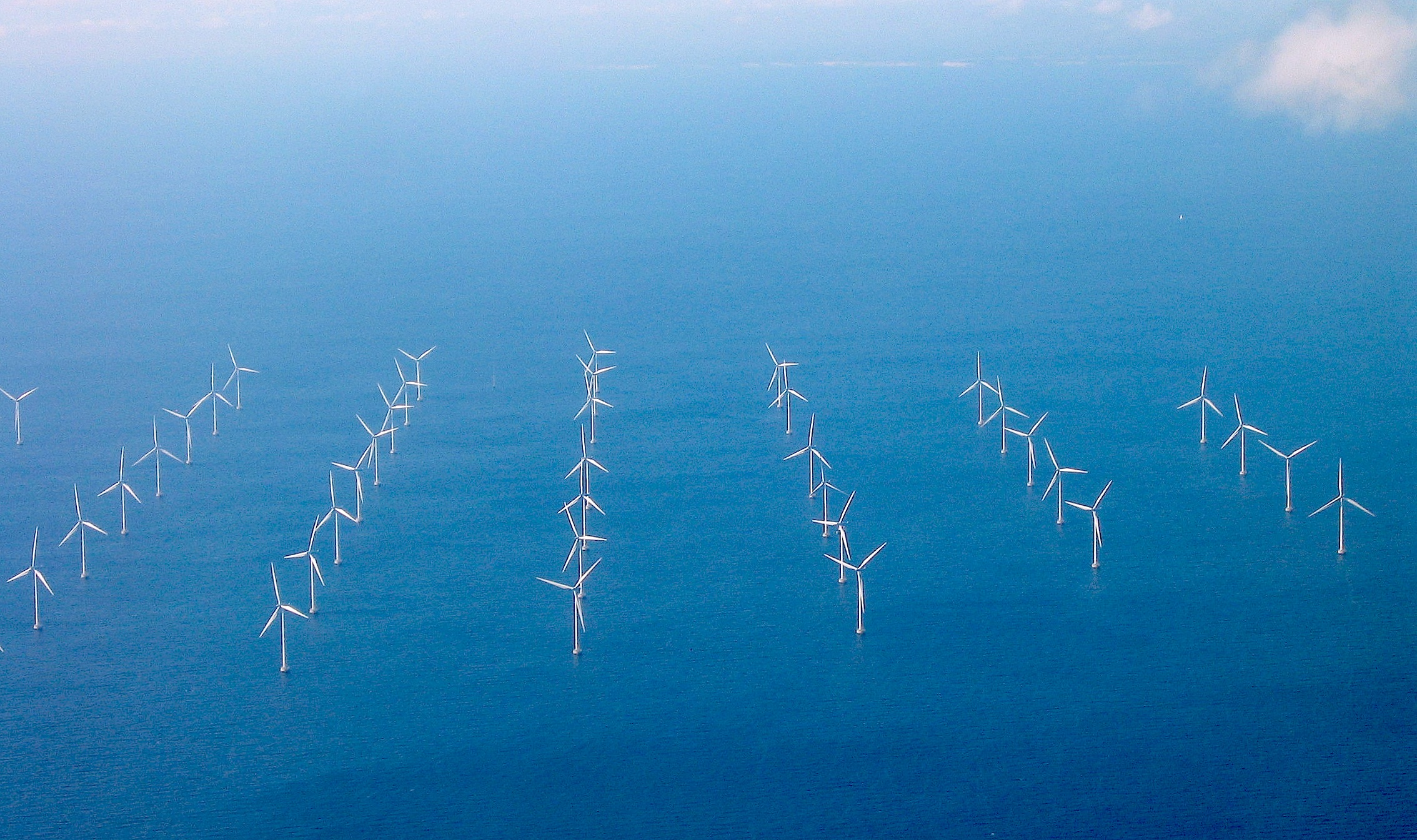
Aerial view of Lillgrund Wind Farm

Offshore wind farm locations (interactive map)

This is a list of operational, offshore wind farms in Sweden (within the national maritime boundaries).

This information is gathered from multiple Internet sources, and commercial sources. The name of the wind farm is the name used by the energy company when referring to the farm and is usually related to a shoal or the name of the nearest town on shore. The "wind farm" part is implied and hence removed for clarity.

== List of current farms ==
The list is sorted by capacity, but it can be sorted in any way by clicking the symbol >< at the top in each column.

Wind farm	Location	Capacity (MW)	Turbines	Commissioning	Build Cost	Depth range (m)	km to shore	Owner	Refs.
Bockstigen	57°2′N 18°9′E	2.75	5x WinWorld 550 kW	1998	€4m	5-6	4-6	Vattenfall	
Lillgrund	55°31′N 12°47′E	110	48x Siemens SWT-2.3-93	2008	€197m	4-13	9	Vattenfall	(Note: Lillgrund)
Vänern	59°15′40″N 13°23′10″E	30	10x WinWind 3MW Dynawind	2010		1-22	10	InnoVent GmbH; Pettersson Vind AB	
Karehamn	56°58′48″N 17°01′12″E	48	16 × Vestas V112-3.0MW	2013	€120m	21	5	E.ON	

== List of past farms ==
Wind farm	Location	Capacity (MW)	Turbines	Commissioning	Build Cost	Depth range (m)	km to shore	Owner	Refs.
Svante 1	56°0′0″N 14°44′0″E	0.22	one 3-bladed Danish W25 0.22 MW	1990–2004		6	0.25	E.ON	
Yttre Stengrund	56°10′0″N 16°1′16″E	10	5x NEG Micon 2MW	2001–2015	€13m	6-8	2-4	Vattenfall	
Utgrunden	56°20′38″N 16°16′48″E	10.5	7x Enron Wind 70 / 1.5MW	2000–2018	£12m	6-15	4-7	Vattenfall	

== See also ==
- List of wind farms in Sweden
- Wind power in Sweden
- List of wind farms
- List of offshore wind farms
- Lists of offshore wind farms by country
- Lists of offshore wind farms by water area
- List of offshore wind farms in the Baltic Sea
