= Horns Rev =

Horns Rev

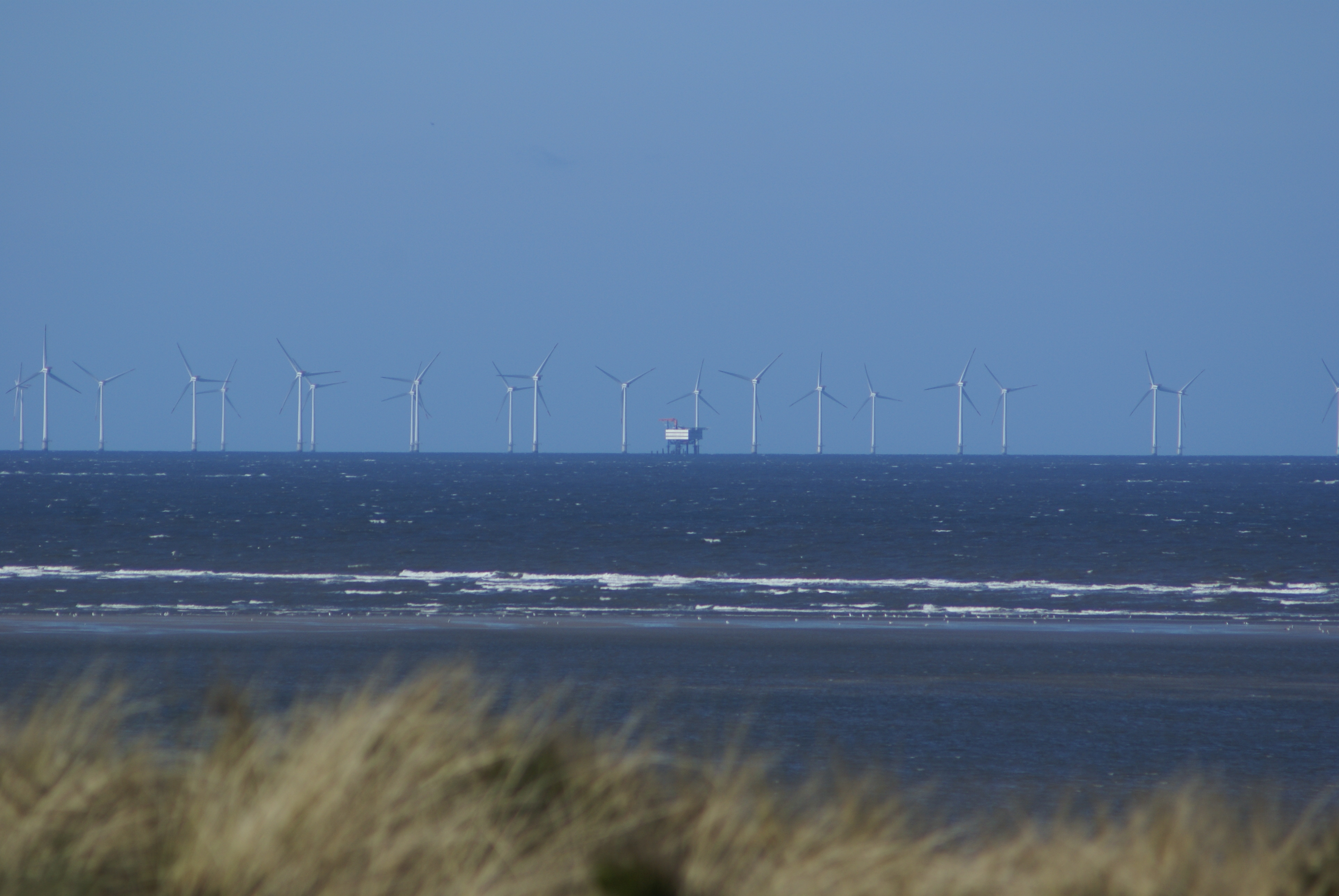
The Danish Horns Rev 1 offshore wind farm with Horns Rev A substation platform (centre), seen from base of the Blåvandshuk lighthouse.

Horns Rev is a shallow sandy reef of glacial deposits in the eastern North Sea, about 15 km (9.3 mi) off the westernmost point of Denmark, Blåvands Huk. For many years Horns Rev was marked by a lightship, though that has now been replaced by light buoys. The reef is the site of the Horns Rev Offshore Wind Farm.

== Horns Rev offshore wind farm ==
At Horns Rev the Danish Energy company Elsam (now Ørsted) built the first offshore wind farm in the North Sea. When the first phase was inaugurated in 2002, Horns Rev wind farm was the first large scale offshore wind farm in the world at 160 MW, four times larger than the previous largest offshore wind farm in the world, the Middelgrunden at 40MW.

A total of 80 Vestas V80-2.0 MW units, capable of producing 160 MW, were installed by the Danish offshore wind farms services provider A2SEA in 2002 with the last turbine coming into operation on 11 December 2002. It receives a guaranteed price of 0.453 DKK/kWh for the first 42,000 hours, paid by electricity consumers. Since 2005, the wind farm has been owned and operated by Vattenfall. It cost DKK2bn. A radar has shown details of the wind patterns, improving local short-term forecasting.

Turbines are laid out as an oblique rectangle of 5 km x 3.8 km (8 horizontal and 10 vertical rows). The distance between turbines is 560 m in both directions.

The main method of transport to the first wind park is an adapted Eurocopter EC-135 helicopter when winds are less than 19 m/s. Hoisting the workers to and from a small platform on each turbine allows access to the park regardless of sea conditions which would otherwise prevent sailing in the area for a large part of the year.

Vattenfall can change a gearbox in a day, and the farm has an availability of 96-97%. Two turbines are burnt out, and are uneconomic to replace with less than 10 years left.

In April 2012, most of the Danish Folketing (parliament) agreed to send out tenders in 2013 for a 400 MW wind farm at Horns Rev called Horns Rev 3, and a 600 MW at Kriegers Flak in the Baltic Sea, both likely receiving 90 øre/kWh for the first 50,000 hours. This was expected to raise wind power in Denmark above the current 39% of annual electricity production, which includes the 400 MW Anholt Offshore Wind Farm. Some of the area is an old minefield from World War Two. Four bidders were qualified for the tender.

Vattenfall won the tender in February 2015, at a price of 77 øre/kWh, well below the 105 øre at Anholt. Vattenfall states that they bid unaggressively against strong competition without sacrificing margins. The price reduction contributes to a smaller "green subsidy" (PSO) over the next years. A total of 49 Vestas V164-8.3 MW units, capable of producing 406.7 MW, will be installed. Three transformers were installed in July 2016.

Findings released from an eight-year study about offshore wind farms in Denmark show that the projects "operate in harmony with the surrounding environment". The 2006 report confirms that both the Horns Rev and Nysted offshore wind farms will double in size in the coming years.
