= Middelgrunden =

Middelgrunden may refer to:

- Middelgrunden (Øresund), a shoal in the Øresund, Denmark
- Middelgrunden wind farm, an offshore wind park on the shoal Middelgrunden
- Middelgrundsfortet, a fort on the shoal Middelgrunden
