= List of offshore wind farms in the Baltic Sea =

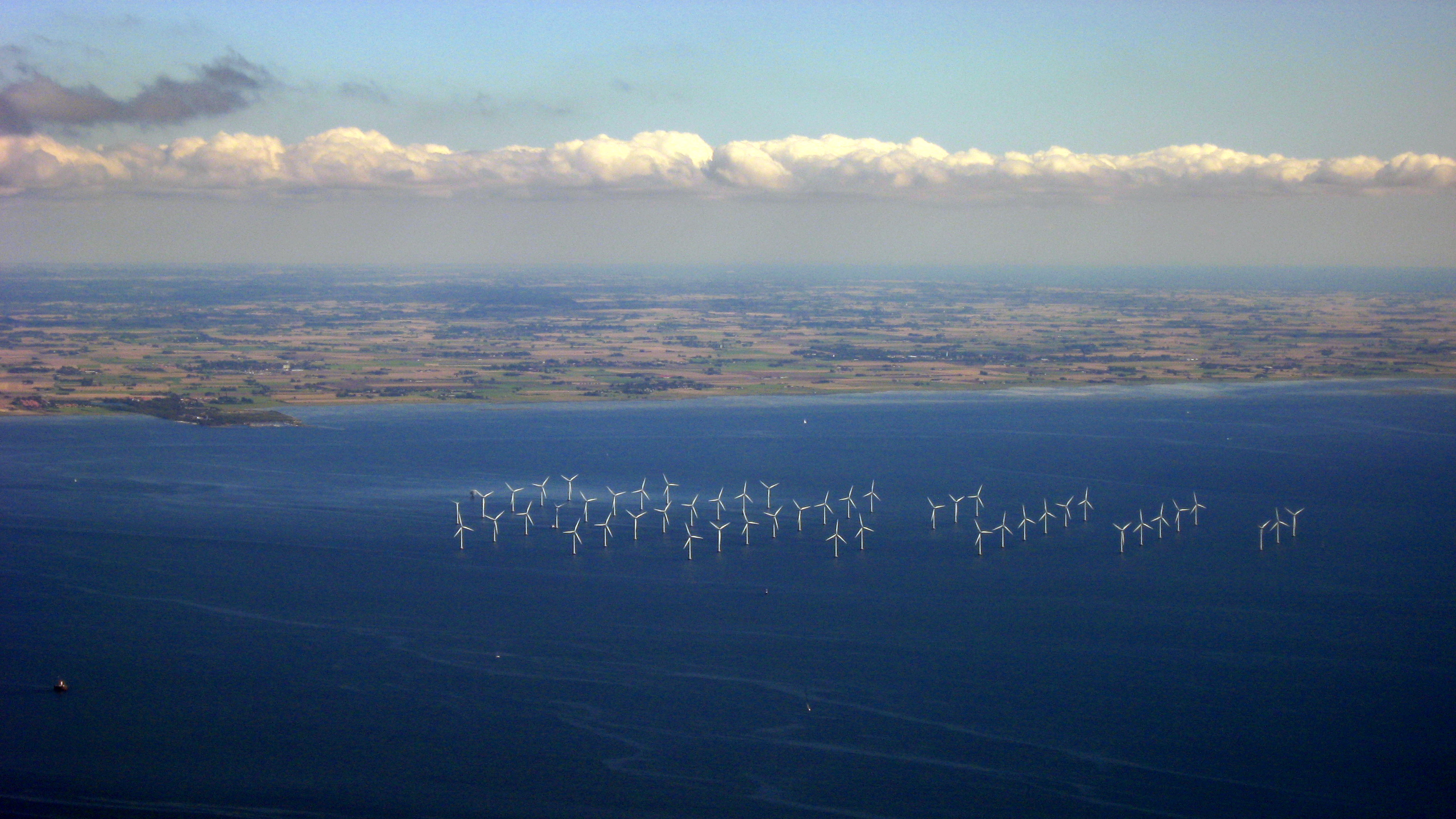
Lillgrund Wind Farm in Sweden

This is a complete list of operational, offshore wind farms in the Baltic Sea and connected areas such as Kattegat and Danish Straits.

This information is gathered from multiple Internet sources, and primarily the 4C Offshore's Global Offshore Wind Farm Map and Database and is current up to February 2015. The name of the Wind Farm is the name used by the Energy Company when referring to the Farm and is usually related to a shoal or the name of the nearest town on shore. The Wind Farm part is implied and hence removed for clarity.

The list is sorted by capacity, but it can be sorted in any way by clicking the symbol >< at the top in each column.

Wind farm	Country	Location	Nameplate capacity (MW)	Turbines	Commissioned	Build cost	Capacity factor	Depth range (m)	km to shore	Owner	References
Kriegers Flak	Denmark	55°01′00″N 12°56′00″E	604.8	72 x Siemens Gamesa SWT-8.4-167	2021	0.372 DKK/kWh		15-30	25	Vattenfall	
Anholt	Denmark	56°36′00″N 11°12′36″E	400	111 × Siemens SWT-3.6-120	2013	€1350m		15	20	Ørsted	(Note: Anholt offshore wind farm)
EnBW Baltic 2	Germany	55°00′00″N 13°12′00″E	288	80 × Siemens SWT 3.6-120	2015	€1250m		23-44	32	EnBW	(Note: EnBW Baltic 2)
Rødsand II	Denmark	54°33′36″N 11°33′0″E	207	90 × Siemens SWP 2.3-93	2010	€400m		6-12	9	E.ON	
Nysted (Rødsand I)	Denmark	54°33′0″N 11°42′36″E	166	72 × Siemens SWP 2.3-82	2003	€248m	36%	6-9	11	Ørsted 50%, PensionDanmark 50%	(Note: Nysted offshore wind farm)
Lillgrund	Sweden	55°31′0″N 12°47′0″E	110	48 × Siemens SWP 2.3-93	2008	€197m		4-13	9	Vattenfall	(Note: Lillgrund)
EnBW Baltic 1	Germany	54°36′36″N 12°39′0″E	48.3	21 × Siemens SWT 2.3-93	2011	€200m		16-19	16	EnBW	(Note: Baltic 1)
Karehamn	Sweden	56°58′48″N 17°01′12″E	48	16 × Vestas V112-3.0MW	2013	€120m		21	5	E.ON	
Offshore Pori Tahkoluoto	Finland	61°37′34″N 21°21′29″E	44	1 × Siemens 2.3MW; 10 × Siemens 4.2MW	2017	€120m		8-15	1	Suomen Hyötytuuli	
Middelgrunden	Denmark	55°41′27″N 12°40′13″E	40	20 × Bonus/Siemens 2MW	2000	€47m	26%	3-6	4.7	50% private, 50% Ørsted	(Note: Middelgrunden Wind Turbine Cooperative Current turbine data)
Kemi Ajos	Finland	65°39′18″N 24°30′47″E	38	5 × Siemens 2.3MW; 8 × Siemens 3.3MW	2016			1-7	3	IKEA	
Samsø	Denmark	55°43′12″N 10°34′48″E	23	10 × Bonus/Siemens 2.3-82	2003	€30m	39%	10-13	4	Municipal, private	(Note: Samsø Sea Wind)
Sprogø	Denmark	55°20′24″N 10°57′36″E	21	7 × Vestas V90-3MW	2009		34%	6-16	10	Great Belt Link	
Utgrunden	Sweden	56°20′38″N 16°16′48″E	11	7 × Enron Wind (GE) 70 / 1.5MW	2000	£12m		6-15	4-7	Vattenfall	
Yttre Stengrund (dismantled)	Sweden	56°10′0″N 16°1′16″E	10	5 × NEG Micon 2MW (Vestas)	2001-2015	€13m		6-8	2-4	Vattenfall	
Frederikshavn	Denmark	57°26′40″N 10°33′40″E	7.6	Nordex N90 2.3 MW, Vestas V90-3MW, Bonus(Siemens) 82.4 2.3 MW	2003		29%	1-4	0.3	Ørsted	
Avedøre Holme	Denmark	55°36′00″N 12°27′36″E	11	3 × Siemens SWT-3.6-120	2009		30%	2	0.5	Ørsted	(Note: Avedøre offshore wind farm)
Tunø Knob	Denmark	55°58′10″N 10°21′20″E	5	10 × Vestas V39 500kW	1995	£10m	30%	3-7	6	Ørsted	
Vindeby (dismantled)	Denmark	54°58′12″N 11°7′48″E	4.95	11 × Bonus 450kW offshore	1991-2017	€10m	24%	2-4	1.8	SEAS/Bonus Energy	
Bockstigen	Sweden	57°2′0″N 18°9′0″E	2.75	5 × WinWorld 550kW	1998	€4m		5-6	4-6	Vattenfall	
"Cap." is the rated nameplate capacity of the wind farm; "When" is the year when the windfarm was or will be commissioned and put into service.; "Cost" is the total capital cost of the project up to commissioning.; "Cap. Fac." is the average capacity factor, i.e. the average power generated by the windfarm, as a percentage of its nameplate capacity.; "km to shore" is the average distance of the windfarm to shore, or (where available) the distance from the in-farm transformer/substation to the shore; "Depth range (m)" is the range of minimum to maximum depths of water that the windfarm is sited in; "Refs" cite the source references for the information. The [w ...] footnotes link to each windfarm's own home page

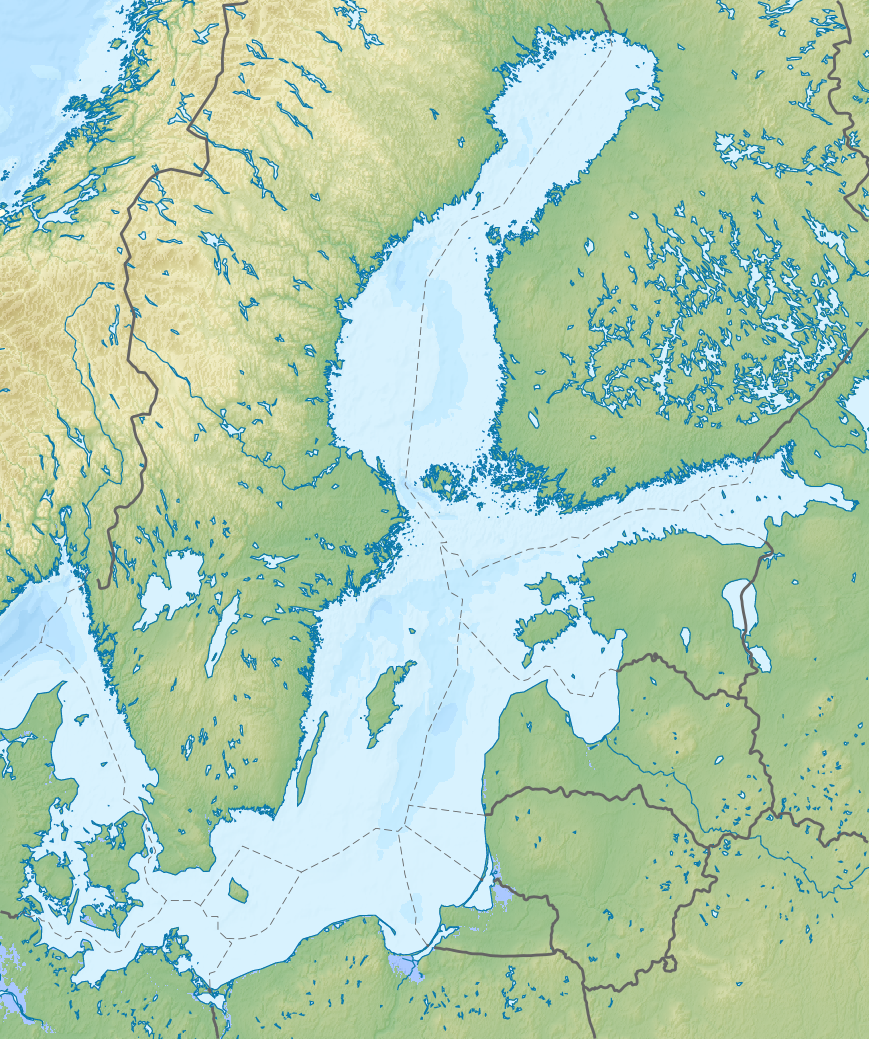
Locations of offshore wind farms in the Baltic Sea

== Planned development ==
Further development of wind farms in the Baltic Seas are planned. In 2023, it was announced that Ignitis and Copenhagen Infrastructure Partners had won the tenders to develop wind farms in both the Liivi 1 and Liivi 2 in the Gulf of Riga areas auctioned by Estonia. The farms are expected to become operational around 2035 and have a theoretical projected capacity of 2.3 gigawatts. The areas located northwest of Ruhnu.

== Wind farm home pages ==
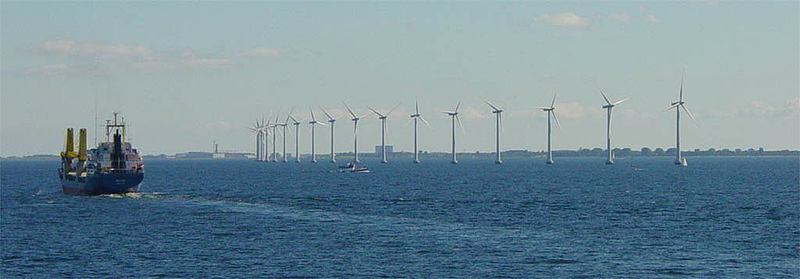
Middelgrunden turbines in Øresund

== See also ==
- Wind power in Europe
- List of wind farms
- List of offshore wind farms
- Lists of offshore wind farms by country
- Lists of offshore wind farms by water area
- List of offshore wind farms in the North Sea
- Wind power in Denmark
- Wind power in Sweden
- Wind power in Finland
- Wind power in Germany
