= Rønland Offshore Wind Farm =

Nearshore wind farm in Denmark

Rønland
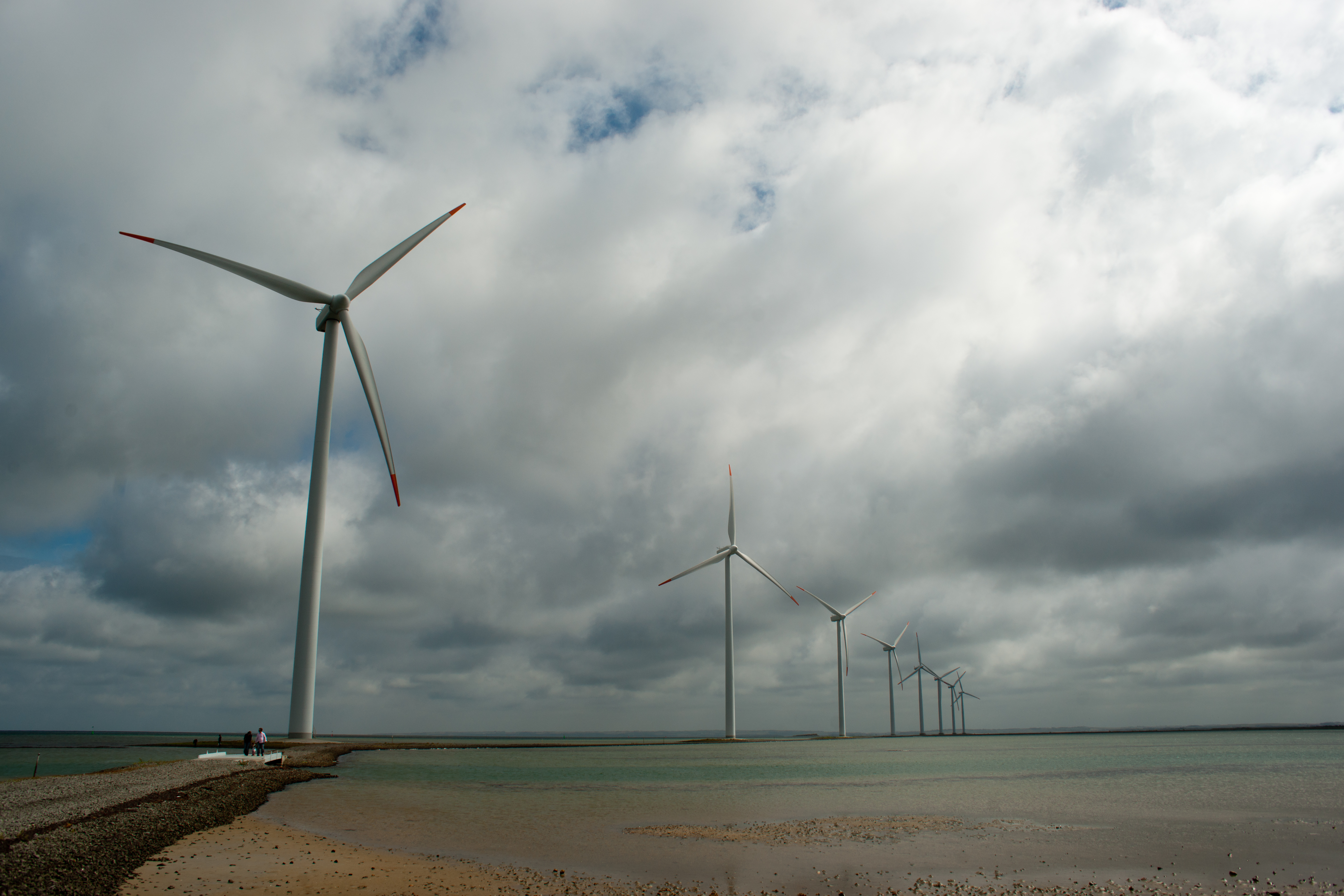
- Rønland Offshore Wind Farm seen from land
- Official name: Rønland Offshore Wind Farm
- Country: Denmark
- Coordinates: 56°39′46″N 8°13′10″E
- Status: Operational
- Commission date: 2003
- Owners: THV (Vestas), Dansk Vindenergi ApS (Bonus)

Wind farm
- Type: Nearshore
- Max. water depth: 2 m (7 ft)
- Distance from shore: 100 m (330 ft)

Power generation
- Units operational: 4 × 2 MW; 4 × 2.3 MW
- Make and model: Vestas V80-2MW, Bonus/Siemens 2.3-93
- Nameplate capacity: 17.2 MW
- Capacity factor: 44.1%

External links
- Website: www.roenland.dk
- Commons: Related media on Commons

Rønland Offshore Wind Farm is a nearshore wind farm in the westmost part of Limfjorden, Denmark. It was commissioned in 2003 and consists of four 2 MW Vestas wind turbines and four 2.3 MW ones from Bonus/Siemens.

Wind turbine locations

== See also ==
- Wind power in Denmark
- List of offshore wind farms in Denmark
