= Wind power in Sweden =

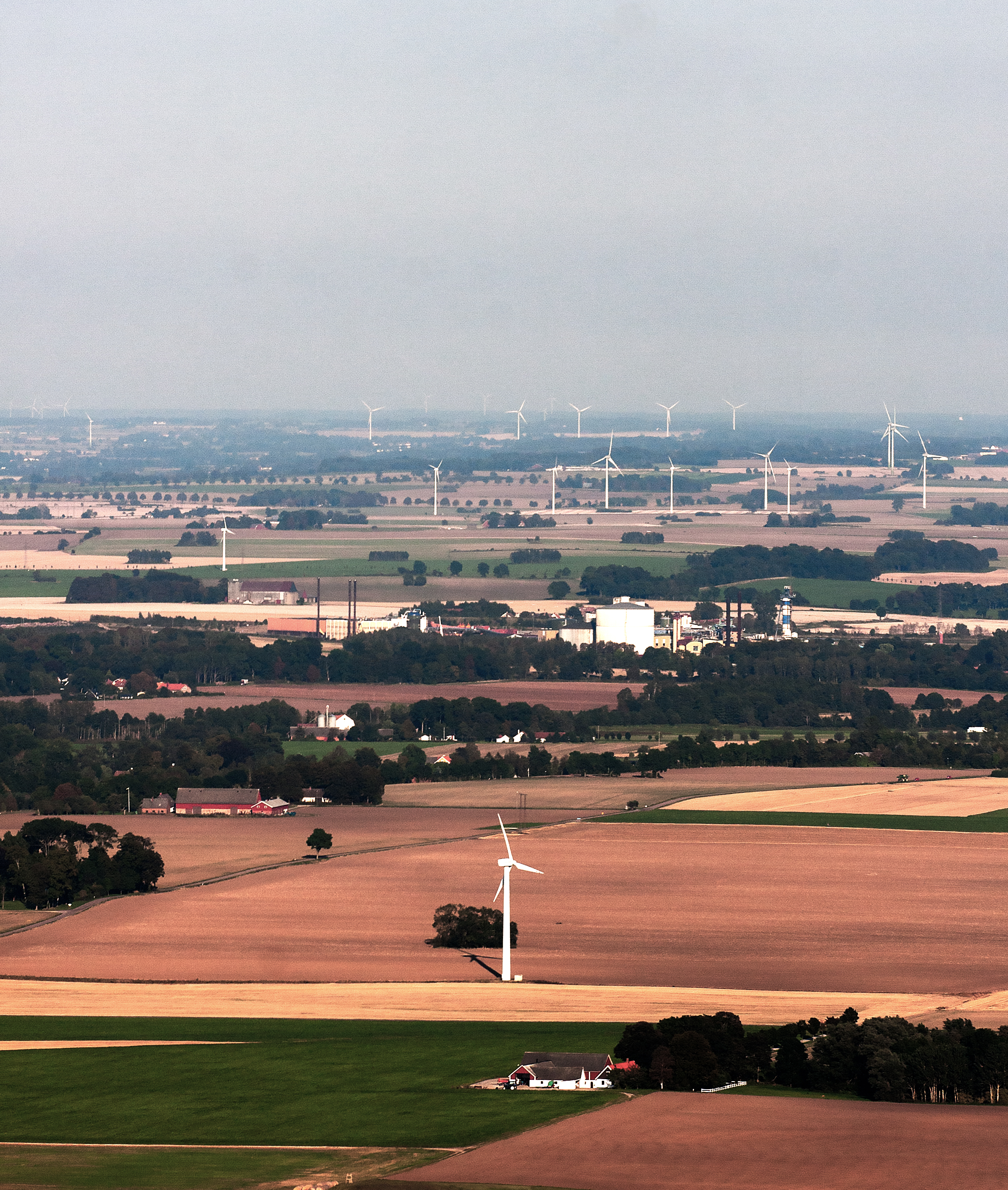
Wind power in Scania, Sweden

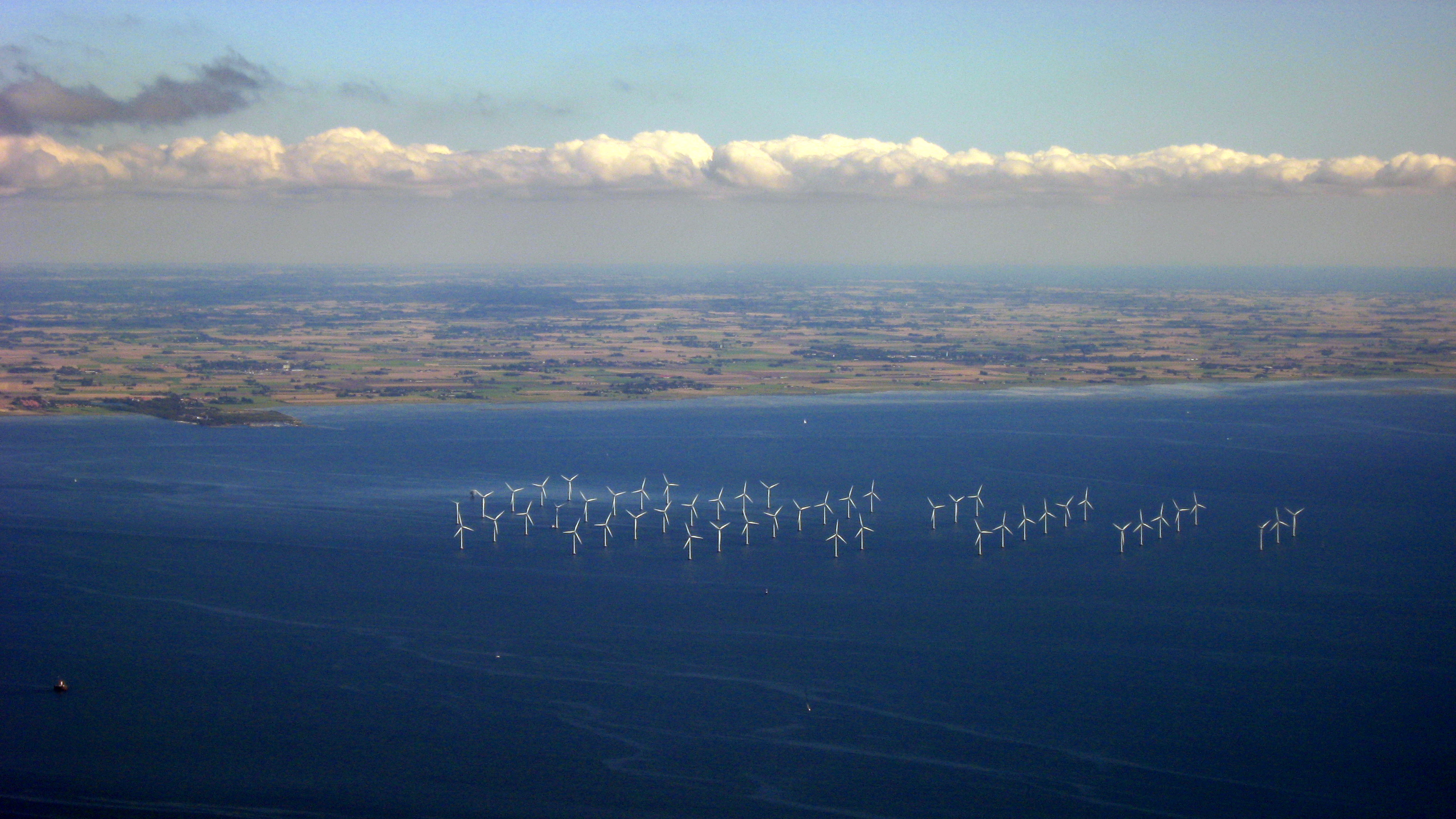
Lillgrund Wind Farm in Sweden

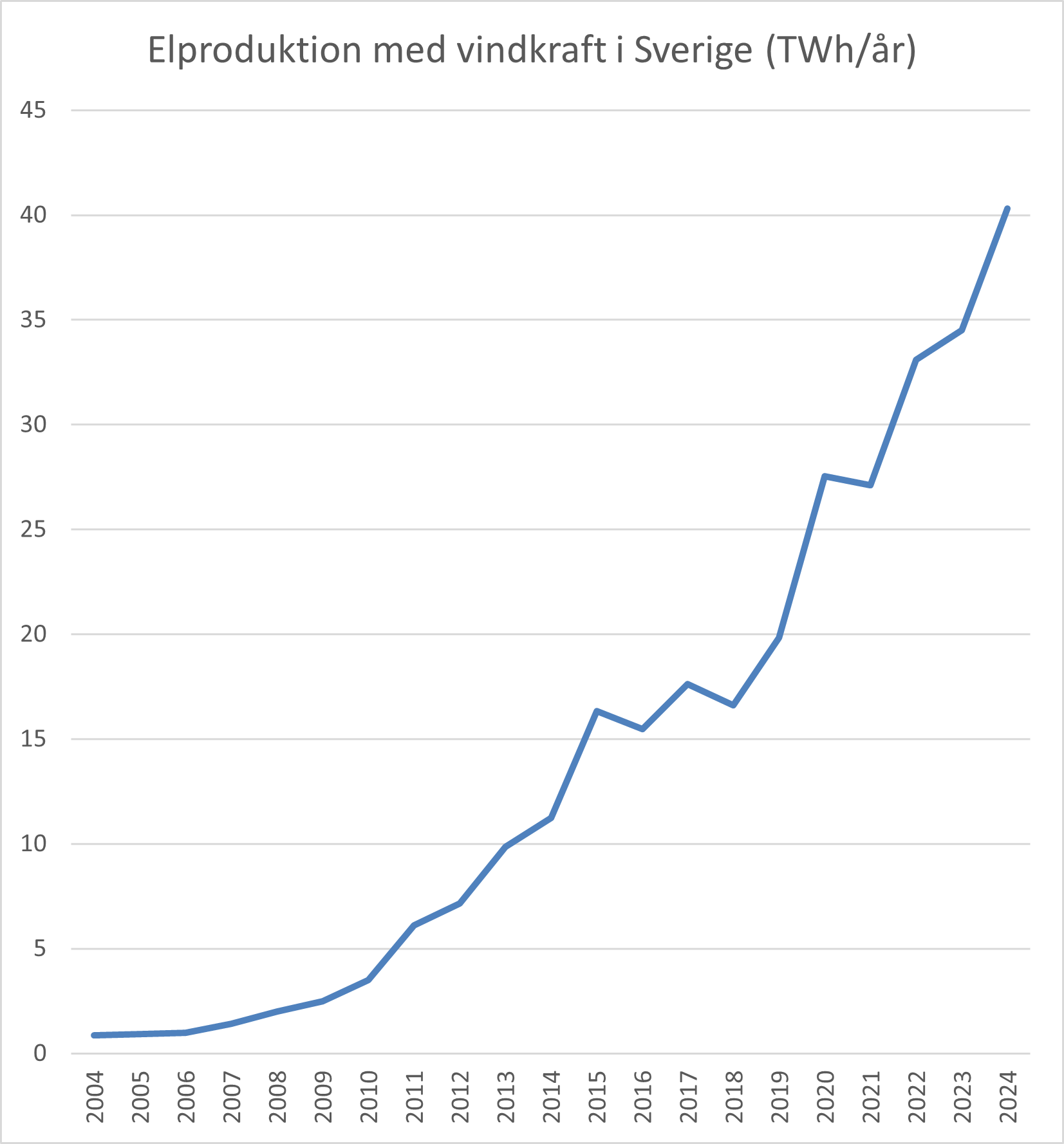
Electriciy produktion in Sweden with windpower 2004-2024 (TWh/year)

Sweden has a total of 16.4 GW of wind power capacity at the end of 2023, the 5th highest in Europe and most per capita. Wind power produced 20.9% of national electricity generation in 2023, up from 0.3% in 2000.

In July 2024, the Swedish Wind Energy Association (SWEA) projected that cumulative wind power capacity in the country will rise to 19.5 GW by the end of 2026.

Longer-term projections from other market analysts estimate 30 GW of wind power capacity by 2030.

== Statistics ==
Wind power in Sweden
Year	Capacity (MW)	Generation (GWh)	Electricity Generation %
2000	241	447	0.3%
2001	295	482	0.3%
2002	345	608	0.4%
2003	404	679	0.5%
2004	452	850	0.6%
2005	493	949	0.6%
2006	583	988	0.7%
2007	832	1,432	1.0%
2008	1,085	1,996	1.3%
2009	1,444	2,485	1.8%
2010	2,004	3,502	2.4%
2011	2,769	6,101	4.1%
2012	3,582	7,165	4.3%
2013	4,469	9,842	6.4%
2014	5,519	11,234	7.3%
2015	6,025	16,268	10.1%
2016	6,519	15,479	9.9%
2017	6,691	17,609	10.7%
2018	7,407	16,623	10.2%
2019	8,985	19,847	11.8%
2020	9,992	27,526	16.8%
2021	12,116	27,108	15.9%
2022	14,278	33,087	19.4%

== Future developments ==
The International Energy Agency's (IEA) Wind Technology Collaboration Programme 2021 report outlines Sweden's progress in wind energy. By 2021, Sweden had achieved a total wind power capacity of 12.116 MW from 4,679 turbines. This aligns with Sweden's environmental goals of reducing greenhouse gas emissions (GHG) by 40% by 2030 and aiming for net-zero emissions by 2045. Additionally, Sweden targets 100% renewable electricity production by 2040. Wind power generation in Sweden is expected to reach about 47 TWh by 2024, supported by growth in both onshore and offshore wind farm developments.

In 2021, the Swedish government ordered new transmission to be planned for offshore wind connections.

Sweden's wind power generation is set for a substantial increase, expected to rise by about 70% from 27.4 terawatt hours (TWh) in 2021 to 46.9 TWh by 2024, according to forecasts by the Swedish Energy Agency. This growth is supported by the addition of 2.1 gigawatts (GW) of wind power capacity in 2021, marking a significant increase to the country's renewable energy capabilities. This initiative is part of Sweden's plan to enhance its total net electricity production, which is expected to grow from 165.7 terawatt hours (TWh) to 183.5 TWh in the same period.

In 2022, Sweden's offshore wind sector had 15 gigawatts (GW) of projects in the permit application stage, expected to commence operations before 2030. The total project pipeline comprises 90 GW, with the majority not projected to be operational until after 2032. Notably, Vattenfall's Swedish Kriegers Flak offshore wind farm, with a capacity of 640 MW, has obtained a permit and awaits the final investment decision.

== Controversy ==
The Association for Swedish Landscape Protection is in opposition to wind power. Their chairman says:

It is beginning to get through, I think, that with the existing nuclear and hydro power available in Sweden, the role for intermittent wind power is marginal and primarily as an exercise in the following of ”fashion”. It has little to contribute to either generation capacity or transmission security. And it is expensive.

— Elisabeth von Brömsen, Public radio SR, March 2011

At the time of making the statement in 2011, wind power accounted for 4.3% of the electricity in Sweden as listed above. As of 2017 it accounted for 12.4%. Comparing the levelized cost of energy, as of November 2019 wind power was estimated at 28 to 54 USD per MWh, compared to 118 to 192 USD per MWh for nuclear power. Whereas according to the 2020 edition of Projected Costs of Generating Electricity, the levelized cost of energy of nuclear energy in Sweden is 28 to 32 USD per MWh.

== See also ==
- List of wind farms in Sweden
- List of offshore wind farms in Sweden
- List of offshore wind farms in the Baltic Sea
- Renewable energy in Sweden
- Biofuel in Sweden
- Energy in Sweden
- Renewable energy by country
