= Horns Rev Offshore Wind Farm =

Group of Danish offshore wind farms in the North Sea

Horns Rev
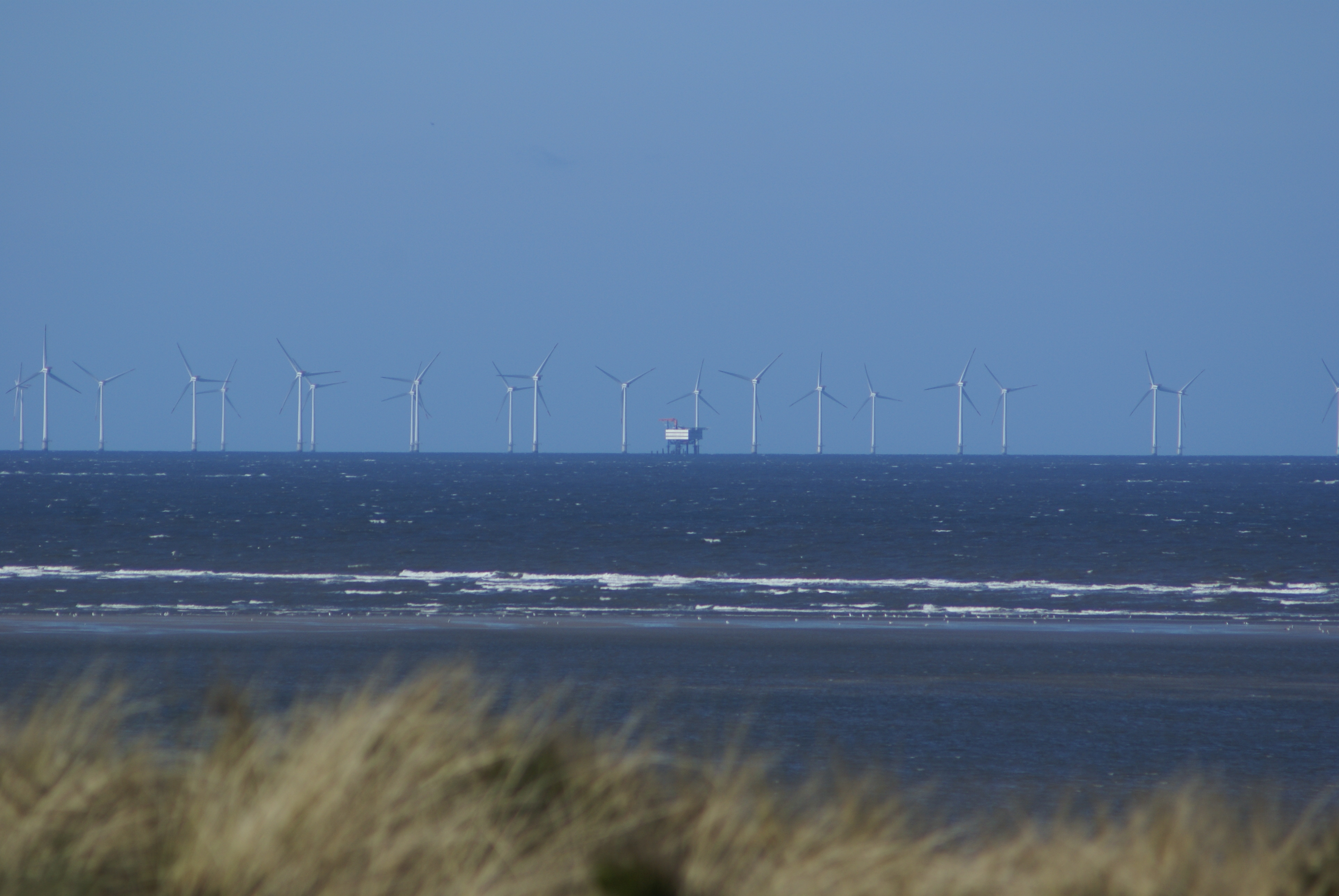
- Horns Rev 1 wind farm with Horns Rev A substation platform
- Country: Denmark
- Location: Horns Rev, East North Sea
- Coordinates: 55°31′47″N 7°54′22″E
- Status: Operational
- Construction began: March 2002 (I); May 2008 (II); 2016 (III)
- Commission date: December 2002 (I); November 2009 (II); 2019 (III)
- Construction cost: €448 million (II) €1 billion (III)
- Owners: Vattenfall (60%),Ørsted (40%) (I); Ørsted (II); Vattenfall (III)
- Operators: Vattenfall (I); Ørsted (II); Vattenfall (III)

Wind farm
- Type: Offshore
- Max. water depth: 6–14 m (20–46 ft) (I); 9–17 m (30–56 ft) (II); 11–19 m (36–62 ft) (III)
- Distance from shore: 14–20 km (9–12 mi) (I); 30 km (19 mi) (II); 29–44 km (18–27 mi) (III)
- Hub height: 70 m (230 ft) (I); 68 m (223 ft) (II); 105 m (344 ft) (III)
- Rotor diameter: 80 m (262 ft) (I); 93 m (305 ft) (II); 164 m (538 ft) (III)
- Rated wind speed: 9.7 m/s (32 ft/s) (I); 10 m/s (33 ft/s) (II); 14 m/s (46 ft/s) (III)

Power generation
- Units operational: 80 × 2 MW (I); 91 × 2.3 MW (II); 49 × 8.3 MW (III)
- Make and model: Vestas: V80-2.0 (I); Siemens: SWT 2.3-93 (II); MHI Vestas: V164 (III)
- Nameplate capacity: 160 MW (I); 209 MW (II); 406.7 MW (III)
- Capacity factor: 47.7% (II)
- Annual net output: 600 GW·h (I)

External links
- Website: www.hornsrev.dk www.dongenergy.com corporate.vattenfall.com
- Commons: Related media on Commons

Wind farm layout

Horns Rev is an offshore wind farm in Danish waters in the North Sea.

The wind farm was built in three phases, the first coming online in 2002, the second in 2009 and the third in 2019. Horns Rev 1, the first phase, was the first large-scale offshore wind farm in the world, with a capacity of 160 MW.

== Horns Rev 1 ==
Horns Rev's location in relation to the wind farms of the German Bight

Horns Rev 1, built by Danish energy company Elsam (later DONG, now Ørsted) was the first large-scale offshore wind farm in the world. Its capacity of 160 MW was four times that of the previous largest, the Middelgrunden at 40 MW. It was the first offshore wind farm in the North Sea, the first to use the monopile foundation type and the first to have its transformer on an adjacent platform rather than onshore. Technologies used for the first time at Horns Rev 1 have since become industry standard.

The farm has 80 Vestas V80 wind turbines, each generating 2.0 MW. They were installed by the Danish offshore wind farm services provider A2SEA in 2002, the last turbine coming into operation on 11 December 2002. A guaranteed price of 0.453 DKK/kWh was agreed for the first 42,000 hours of generation.

In 2005, 60% of the wind farm was sold to Vattenfall, also the operator of the park, for DKK2bn.

The turbines are laid out in an oblique 8 by 10 grid over an area of 5 km × 3.8 km, with 560 m between turbines in both directions. A radar measures details of the wind patterns, improving local short-term forecasting.

The main method of transport to the first wind park is an adapted Eurocopter EC-135 helicopter, used to hoist workers to and from a small platform on each turbine. Sea conditions render the area inaccessible to boats for large parts of the year.

The farm has an availability of 96–97%. Two turbines are burnt out, and uneconomic to replace with less than 10 years left. Grout between monopile and tower was damaged by vibrations, requiring a costly fix.

In 2008, scientists discovered that the rotating blades were mixing the layers of air and forming fog, producing white trails behind its turbines.

== Horns Rev 2 ==
In May 2008, Dong Energy began construction of the second wind farm in the Horns Rev area, Horns Rev 2. Construction was completed in September 2009 and was inaugurated on September 17, 2009 by Prince Frederik on the Poseidon accommodation platform. When inaugurated, Horns Rev 2 was the largest offshore wind farm in the world until Thanet Wind Farm opened on 23 September 2010.

For the year of 2012, HR2 reached a capacity factor of 52.0%. It receives 51.8 øre/kWh for the first 50,000 hours, paid by electricity consumers. The farm has had some cable outages, and blades are being renovated.

The Horns Rev 2 consists of 91 Siemens Wind Power SWT 2.3-93 wind turbines with a total generating capacity of 209 MW. The foundations are monopiles like on Horns Rev 1.

It has the first offshore wind farm accommodation platform in the world, named Poseidon. It is connected by walkway to the transformer platform, and is 750 square metres (8,100 sq ft) large with 3 decks and weighs 422 tons. On-site accommodation is cheaper and more efficient than transporting service personnel by boat 2 hours from Esbjerg harbour 60 kilometres (37 mi) away. A turbine is visited 10 times a year on average, mostly for routine service, and 1-2 times for fixing faults. Flying people by helicopter to turbines like on Horns Rev 1 is not possible on Horns Rev 2 as the turbines there are not built for it, although the transformer platform has a helipad. Poseidon has 24 rooms of 12 square meters each fitted with TV and internet. There is a gym, kitchen, dining room, laundry room, and a study room. Inspired by Poseidon, a similar platform is being built at the DanTysk wind farm.

== Horns Rev 3 ==
In April 2012, most of the Danish Folketing (parliament) agreed to send out tenders in 2013 for a 400 MW wind farm at Horns Rev called Horns Rev 3, and a 600 MW at Kriegers Flak in the Baltic Sea, both likely receiving 90 øre/kWh for the first 50,000 hours. This is expected to raise wind power in Denmark above the 39% of annual electricity production (as of 2014), which includes the 400 MW Anholt Offshore Wind Farm. The Danish Energy Agency expects construction candidates for Horns Rev 3 to have experience with installing and operating a large offshore wind farm. Some of the area is an old minefield from World War Two. Four bidders were qualified for the tender.

Vattenfall won the tender in February 2015, at a price of 77 øre/kWh, well below the 105 øre at Anholt. Vattenfall states that they bid unaggressively against strong competition without sacrificing margins. The price reduction contributes to a smaller "green subsidy" (PSO) over the next years. Horns Rev 3 consists of a total of 49 MHI Vestas V164-8.3 MW units, capable of producing 406.7 MW. Three transformers were installed in July 2016. The first turbines started to produce electricity for the grid in December 2018, and the last turbine was installed in January 2019. The official inauguration of Horns Rev 3 was on 22 August 2019.

== See also ==
- Wind power in Denmark
- List of offshore wind farms in Denmark
- List of offshore wind farms in the North Sea
- List of offshore wind farms
