= Anholt Offshore Wind Farm =

Danish offshore wind power wind farm

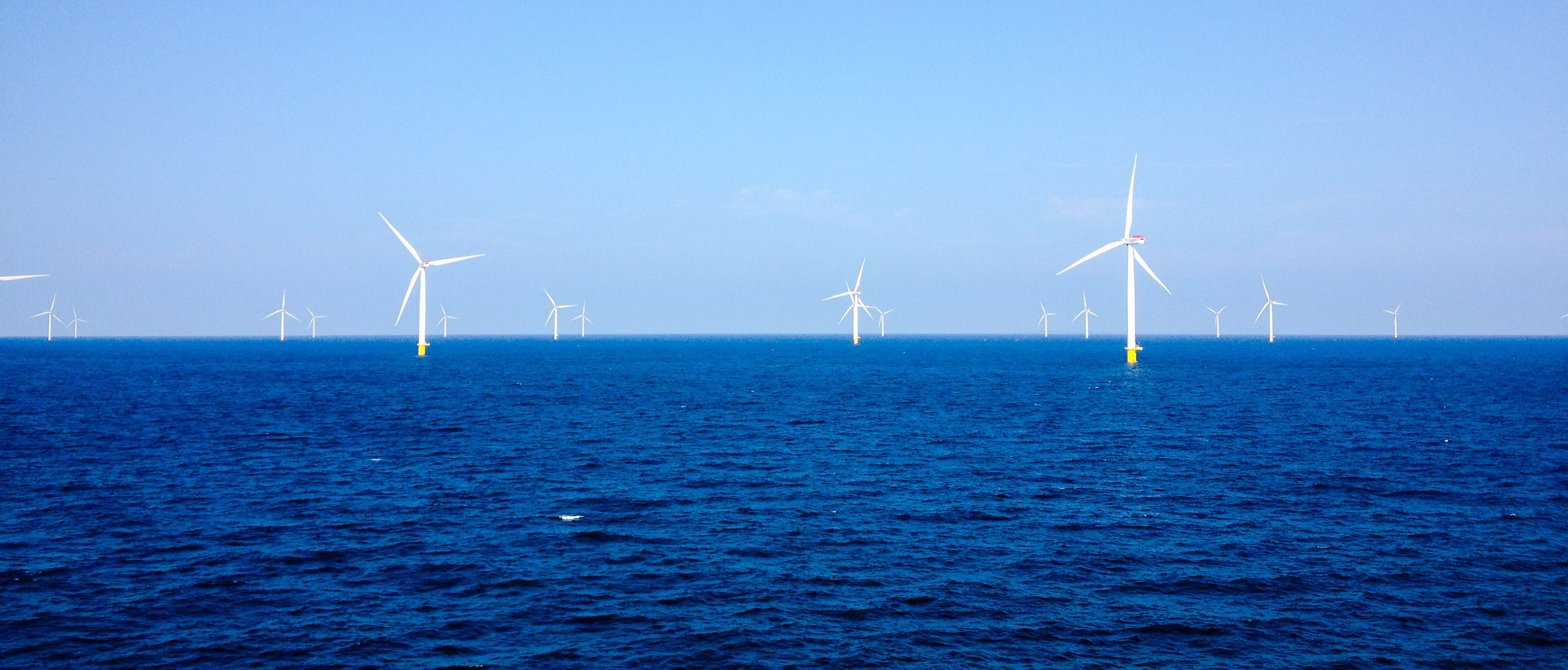
- Official name: Anholt Havmøllepark
- Country: Denmark
- Location: Kattegat near Norddjurs
- Coordinates: 56°36′N 11°13′E
- Status: Operational
- Construction began: 2012
- Commission date: 4 September 2013
- Construction cost: 10 billion Danish kroner
- Owners: PKA; PensionDanmark; Ørsted
- Operator: Ørsted

Wind farm
- Type: Offshore
- Max. water depth: 14–17 m (46–56 ft)
- Distance from shore: 21 km (13 mi)
- Rotor diameter: 120 m (390 ft)
- Site area: 88 km^{2} (34 sq mi)

Power generation
- Units operational: 111 × 3.6 MW
- Make and model: Siemens Gamesa SWT-3.6-120 (111)
- Nameplate capacity: 400 MW
- Capacity factor: 48.7 %

External links
- Website: www.anholt-windfarm.com
- Commons: Related media on Commons

Wind farm layout

Anholt Offshore Wind Farm is a Danish offshore wind power wind farm in the Kattegat, between Djursland and Anholt island. With a nameplate capacity of 400 megawatts (MW), it is one of the largest offshore wind farm in the world (along with BARD Offshore 1) and was the largest in Denmark from 2013 to 2019 (when Horns Rev 3 was inaugurated). A cable from the wind farm to Anholt replaces most of the diesel-powered electricity on the island.

== Project ==
=== Economy ===
The project was conceived in February 2008, as part of the Danish government's Energy Policy Agreement. The wind farm cost an estimated 10 billion Danish kroner (€1.35 bn, US$1.65 bn). During operation, DONG receives a feed-in tariff of 1.051 DKK/kW·h (17 US¢/kW·h) for the first 20 TW·h (about 12–13 years of production), whereas the 207 MW Rødsand 2 receives 0.629 DKK/kW·h for 10 TW·h.

DONG Energy was the only bidder for the project, and received the license to build it in 2010. Newsmedia and politicians suggest a tight schedule with tough sanctions as reasons for the single bid and higher price, and the subsequent Horns Rev 3 offshore wind farm had 4 bidders in 2015 and costs 0.77 DKK/kW·h, well below the 105 øre at Anholt.

=== Technology ===
DONG contracted Siemens Wind Power to supply 111 3.6 MW wind turbines for the project, placed in 14 metres (46 ft) water depth.

A platform holds 3 transformers which increase voltage from 33 to 220 kV for transporting the alternating current power 25 kilometres (16 mi) to land through a single 3-conductor cable (diameter 26 cm or 10 in) and a further 56 km (35 mi) to Trige (near Aarhus) where a 400 kV main power hub can distribute the power. There are switchyard reactors along the cable to provide reactive power to compensate for line capacitance.

The agreement required first power to be produced before the end of 2012, and be fully commissioned before the end of 2013. In March 2011, DONG Energy sold 50% of the Anholt wind farm to a consortium consisting of PensionDanmark (30%) and PKA (Pensionskassernes Administration, 20%) for DKK 6 billion (US$1.14 billion) payable in 4 rates between 2011 and 2013.

Usually, turbines are placed in a grid pattern of lines and rows. But the turbines of AOWF are placed in an unusual pattern, governed by two principles: put most of them along the edges, and put most in undisturbed airflow from the main direction, which is West-southwest. This would increase production by 1.5%, a lifetime value of more than 100m DKK.

== Construction ==
On 31 December 2011, the heavy lift vessel (HLV) Svanen placed the first foundation monopile.

Official construction of the wind farm started on 13 January 2012.

The first turbine was installed on 3 September and connected to the Danish power grid on 21 September.

In May 2013, AOWF became Denmark's largest wind farm when 59 turbines were grid connected, totalling 212MW and surpassing Horns Rev 2. The vessel Sea Installer erected a complete tower, and installed a wind turbine in 7 hours.

On 19 May 2013, the installation vessel Sea Power erected the last of the 111 turbines at Anholt Offshore Wind Farm.

The wind farm achieved full power in June 2013, and was inaugurated and commissioned on 4 September 2013.

== Operation ==
The connection cable has been out of service twice; first the land cable failed for a week in 2014 costing Energinet.dk 9 million DKK in compensation to DONG. In February 2015 the sea cable failed, and Anholt island reverted to its diesel engines.

As of 2015, the farm has produced 4,427 GWh.

== See also ==
- Wind power in Denmark
- List of offshore wind farms in Denmark
- List of offshore wind farms
