= Avedøre Holme Offshore Wind Farm =

Nearshore wind farm in Denmark

Avedøre Holme
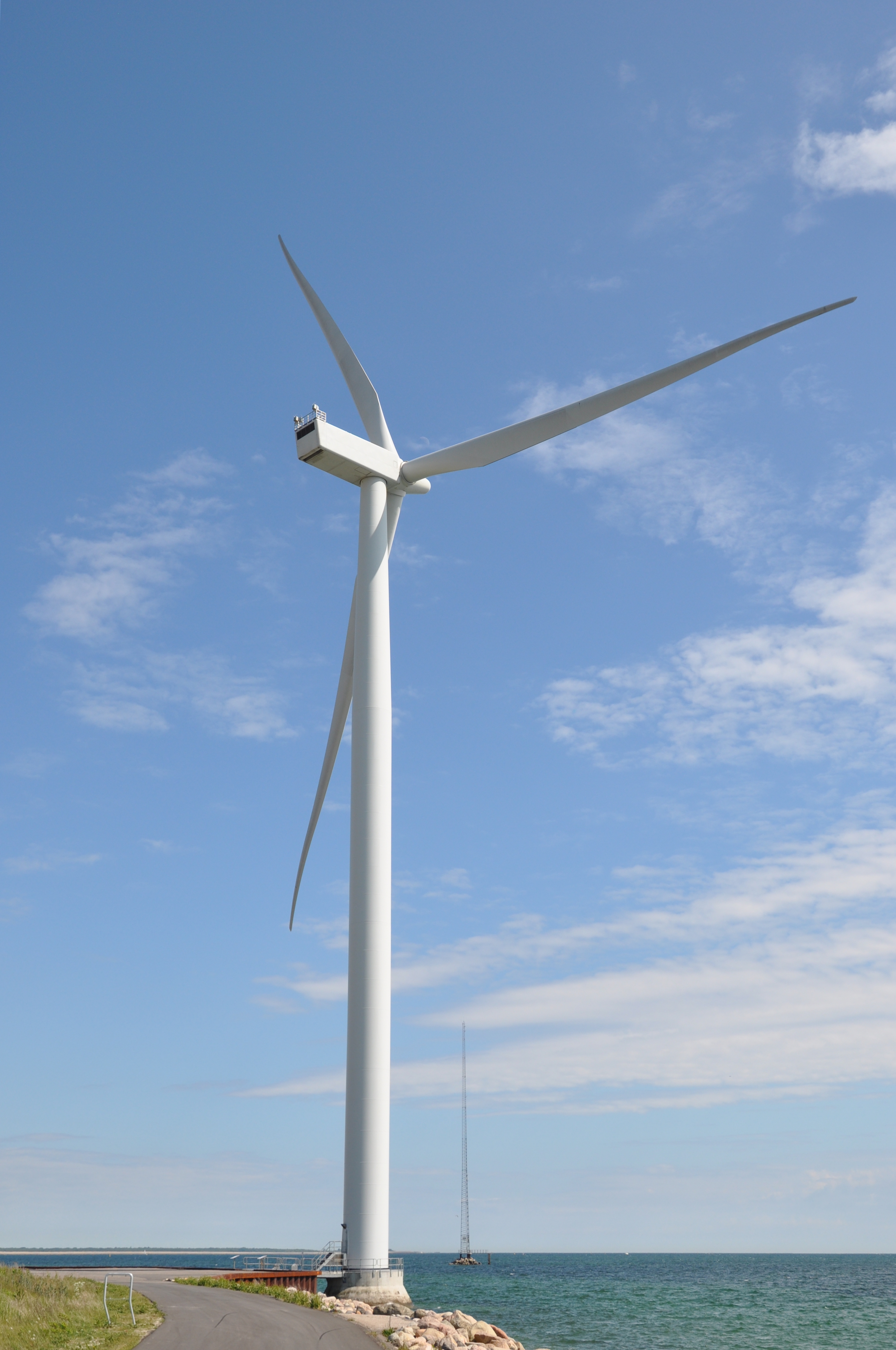
- One of the Siemens turbines of Avedøre Holme
- Official name: Avedøre Holme Offshore Wind Farm
- Country: Denmark
- Coordinates: 55°36′0″N 12°27′30″E
- Status: Operational
- Commission date: 2009
- Construction cost: €25m
- Owners: 2/3 DONG Energy, 1/3 private
- Operator: Ørsted

Wind farm
- Type: Nearshore
- Max. water depth: 2 m (7 ft)
- Distance from shore: 10 m (33 ft)
- Hub height: 93 m
- Rotor diameter: 120 m

Power generation
- Units operational: 3 x 3.6 MW
- Make and model: Siemens SWP3.6-120 VS
- Nameplate capacity: 10.8 MW
- Capacity factor: 38%

Avedøre Holme Offshore Wind Farm is a nearshore wind farm right off the coast of Avedøre, Copenhagen. It was commissioned in 2009 with three 3.6 MW Siemens turbines as a demonstrator project for future offshore wind turbines. Ørsted owns two turbines, and a private collective owns the third. Ørsted and partners build a 2MW hydrogen electrolysis station at Avedøre Power Station supplied by Ørsted's two turbines.

== See also ==
- Wind power in Denmark
- List of offshore wind farms in Denmark
- Avedøre Power Station
