= Lillgrund Wind Farm =

Wind farm off the coast of southern Sweden

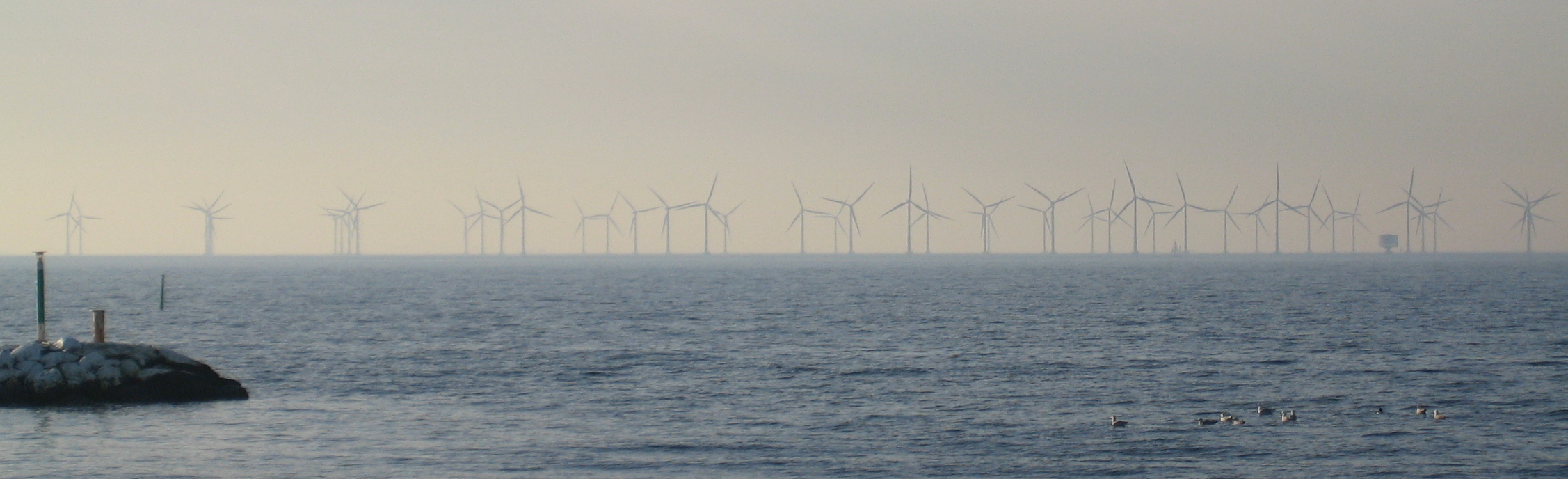
- Lillgrund Wind Farm seen from Klagshamns point
- Lillgrund Wind Farm within the Skåne region, Sweden
- Country: Sweden
- Location: Øresund
- Coordinates: 55°31′N 12°47′E
- Status: Operational
- Construction began: August 2006
- Commission date: June 2008
- Owner: Vattenfall

Wind farm
- Type: Offshore
- Max. water depth: 4–8 m (13–26 ft)
- Distance from shore: 7 km (4.3 mi)
- Hub height: 65 m (213 ft)
- Rotor diameter: 93 m (305 ft)

Power generation
- Units operational: 48 × 2.3 MW
- Make and model: Siemens Gamesa SWT-2.3-93 (48)
- Nameplate capacity: 110.4 MW
- Annual net output: 330 GWh

External links
- Commons: Related media on Commons

Wind farm layout

Lillgrund Wind Farm is located about 10 km off the coast of southern Sweden, just south of the Öresund Bridge, where average wind speeds are 8 to 10 metres per second (26 to 33 ft/s). With 48 wind turbines (Siemens SWT-2.3-93) and a capacity of 110 megawatts (MW), Lillgrund is Sweden's largest offshore wind farm. It was designed to meet the domestic electricity demand of more than 60,000 homes. The farm's turbines have a rotor diameter of 93 metres and a total height of 115 metres.

A 2016 study found no significant effect on marine life.

The music video for "Peroxide", a song by British-Swedish singer Ecco2k included on his studio album E (2019), was filmed at the Lillgrund Wind Farm.

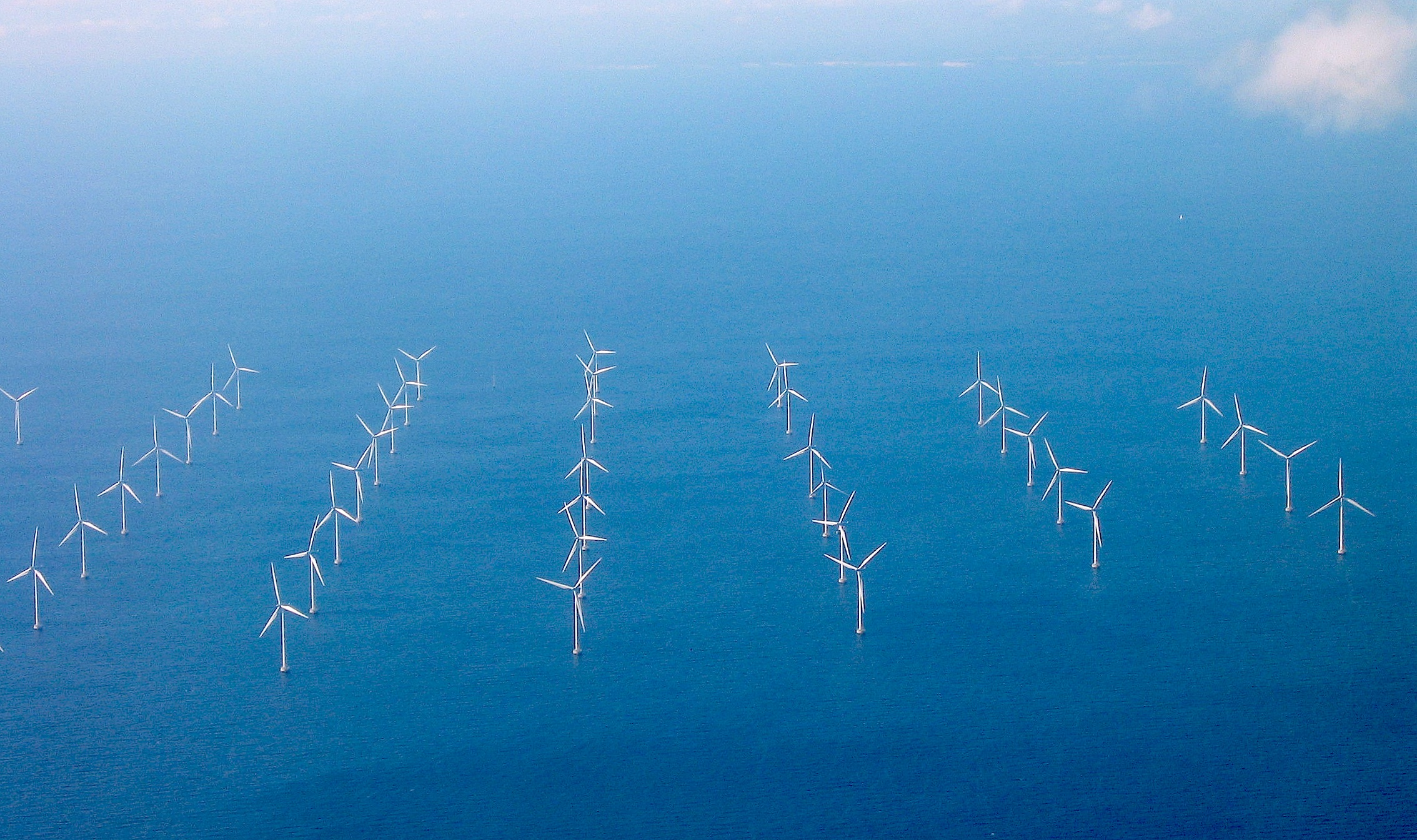
Aerial view of Lillgrund

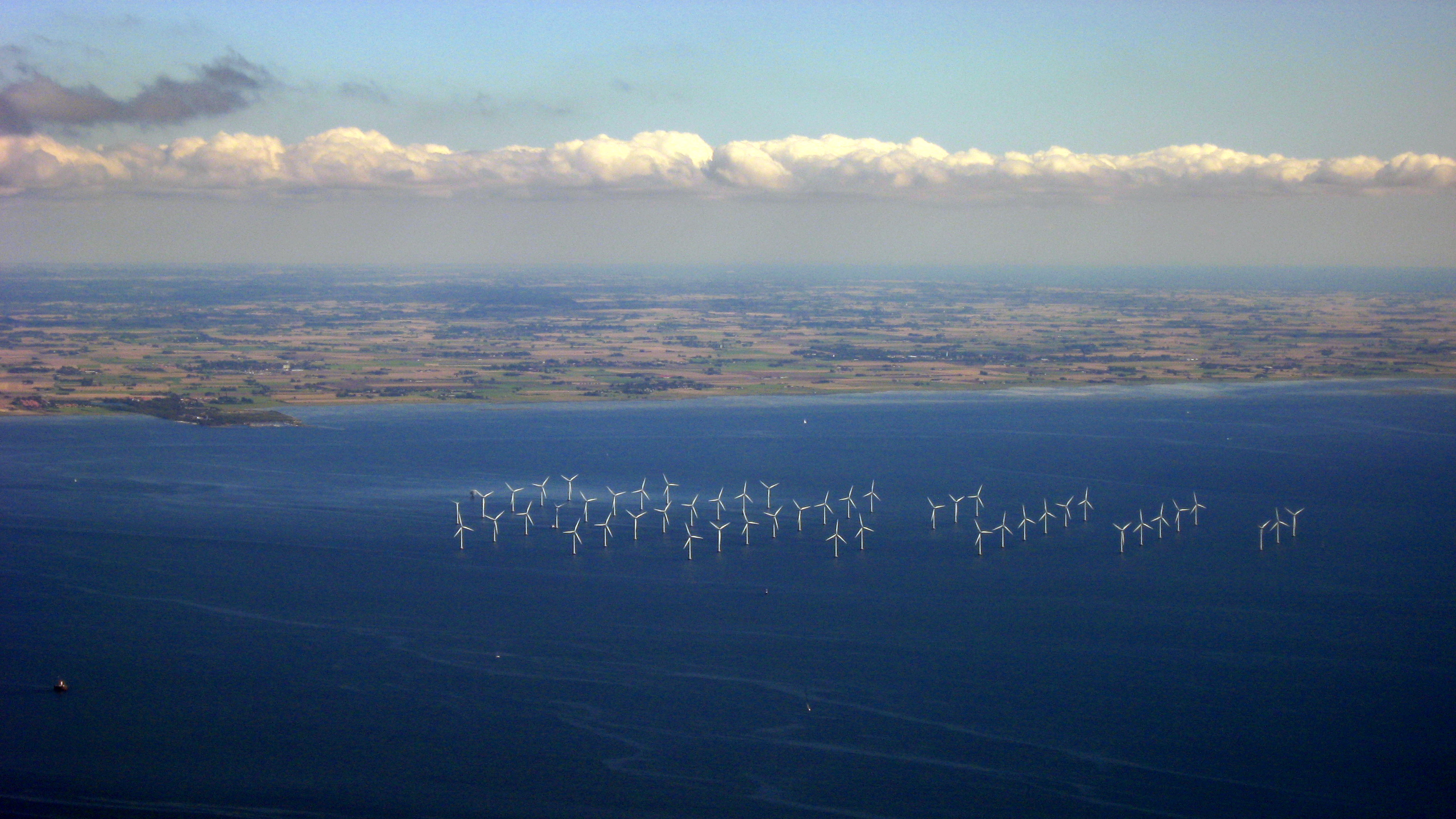
Aerial view of Lillgrund

== See also ==
- List of offshore wind farms in Sweden
- List of offshore wind farms in the Baltic Sea
- List of large wind farms
- List of wind farms in Sweden
- List of offshore wind farms
