= Avedøre Power Station =

Power station in Denmark

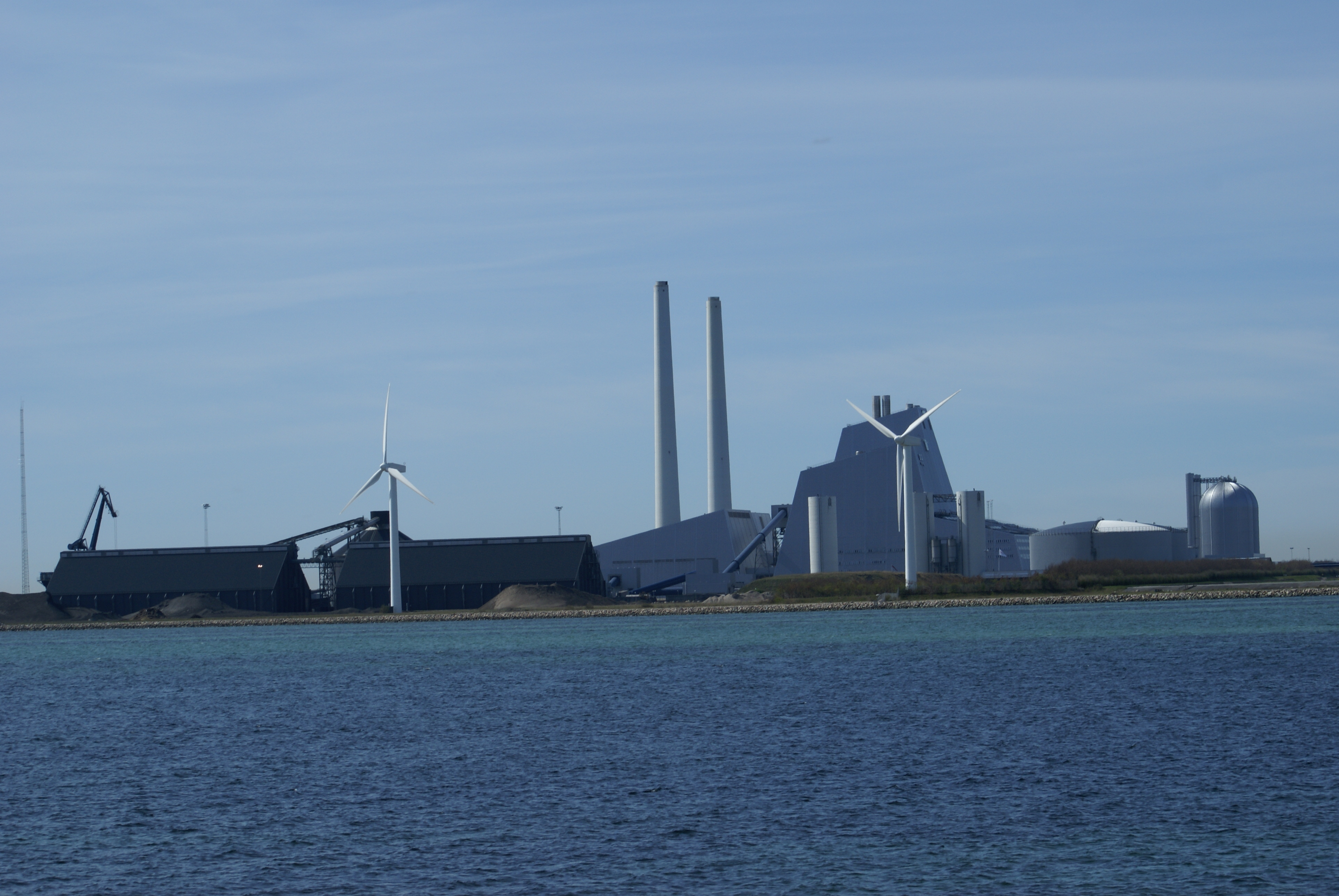
- Avedøre Power Station seen from the waterside.
- Official name: Avedøreværket
- Country: Denmark
- Location: Avedøre
- Coordinates: 55.602761°N 12.47925°E
- Status: Operational
- Commission date: 1990 (unit 1); 2001 (unit 2)
- Owner: Ørsted
- Operator: Ørsted

Thermal power station
- Primary fuel: Biomass (unit 1) biomass (straw and wood pellets) (unit 2)
- Secondary fuel: Natural gas and oil
- Cogeneration?: Yes

Power generation
- Units operational: 1 x 250 MW; 1 x 543 MW
- Nameplate capacity: 793 MW

External links
- Commons: Related media on Commons

The Avedøre Power Station (Danish: Avedøreværket) is a combined heat and power station, located in Avedøre, Denmark, just south of Copenhagen, and is owned by Ørsted A/S. Avedøre Power Plant is a high-technology facility and one of the world's most efficient of its kind, being able to utilize as much as 94% of the energy in the fuel and convert 49% of the fuel energy into electricity. Apart from using petroleum (oil) and natural gas, the plant runs on a wide variety of biomass fuels such as straw and wood pellets. The plant consists of two units with a total capacity of 793 MW of electricity and 918 MW of heat. The combination of producing electricity (combined heat and power) and heat for district heating at the same time is widely used in Denmark and the rest of Scandinavia, due to the need of domestic (and industrial) heating together with the Danish energy companies putting a big effort into optimising the energy plants.

The Avedøre Power Station was designed by the architects Claus Bjarrum and Jørgen Hauxner.

== Avedøre unit 1 ==
Having been built in 1990 this is the oldest unit. Coal was the primary fuel used in this unit, but oil can also be used. By utilising the excess heat from the power production for district heating, Avedøre unit 1 attained an energy conversion efficiency of up to 91%. This made Avedøre 1 one of the world's most efficient coal-fired power plants. As of 2015, it is being converted from coal to wood pellets at a price of DKK 740 million. It will burn 1.2 million tonnes of wood pellets per year, reducing CO_{2} emissions by about a million tonnes.

== Avedøre unit 2 ==
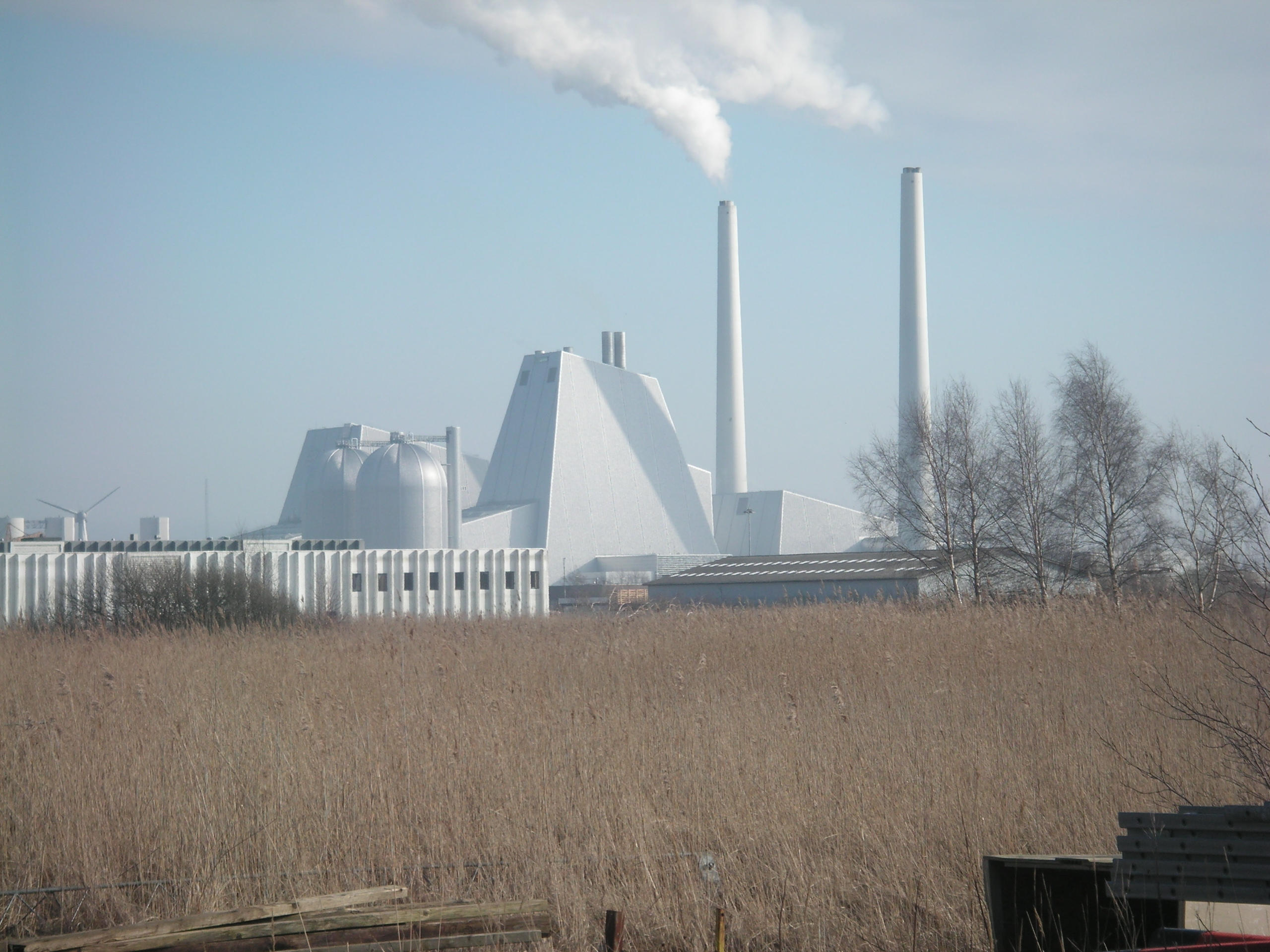
Avedøre Power Station seen from landward

Having been built in 2001 this is the newest and most efficient unit at Avedøre Power Station. It is able to burn a wide variety of fuels like natural gas, heavy fuel oil, straw and wood pellets in the same burners. It has a super critical boiler, built by the Danish company Burmeister & Wain Energy. The Avedøre unit 2 has a production capacity of 585 MW of electricity and 570 MW of heat and is the most efficient of the two units.

The Avedøre unit 2 also consists of multiple sub-units. The main sub-unit, the 80 metres (260 ft) super critical boiler is linked to a steam turbine and an electrical generator. One of the world's biggest biomass boilers also is connected to this in parallel to the turbine. Furthermore, unit 2 comprises two separate gas turbines with a capacity of 110 MW each.

Avedøre unit 2 has an electrical efficiency of 49%, which makes it one of the world's most efficient. This record high efficiency is obtained when the unit is only producing electricity. When also producing heat for district heating the electrical efficiency decreases, as the heat exchange is carried out at a higher temperature. If the export of heat energy to district heating is taken into account the energy conversion efficiency reaches 94-96%, making it one of the world's most efficient combined heat and power (CHP) stations. In preparation for conversion to 100% biomass in 2027, the plant has received a 360 tonne crane capable of transferring 800 tonnes of wood pellets per hour from ship to shore, although some environmentalists question the benefits of biomass.

As a by-product, high quality plaster is made when cleaning the flue gas.

== See also ==
Avedøre Holme Offshore Wind Farm
