= Yttre Stengrund offshore wind farm =

Offshore wind farm in Sweden

Yttre Stengrund
- Location of Yttre Stengrund
- Official name: Yttre Stengrund offshore wind farm
- Country: Sweden
- Coordinates: 56.166423°N 16.017246°E
- Status: Decommissioned
- Commission date: 2001
- Decommission date: November 2015
- Operator: Vattenfall

Wind farm
- Type: Offshore

Power generation
- Make and model: NEG Micon 2 MW
- Units decommissioned: 5 x 2 MW
- Nameplate capacity: 10 MW

Yttre Stengrund was an offshore wind farm in Sweden, operated by Vattenfall. The wind farm was commissioned in 2001, using five 2 MW NEG Micon turbines. All turbines in Yttre Stengrund were decommissioned by November 2015, becoming the first offshore wind farm to be decommissioned in the world.

== Decommissioning ==
Maria Hassel, project manager of the dismantling operation for Vattenfall, commented:

The turbines that were installed at Yttre Stengrund were an early model and only about 50 of them in total were actually produced. The difficulty of getting hold of spare parts and the huge cost involved in upgrading the turbines and gearboxes meant that it wasn’t financially viable to replace the turbines.
