= Middelgrunden (Øresund) =

Coordinates: 55°41′52″N 12°40′07″E

Middelgrunden is a shoal in the Øresund, the strait that separates Denmark from Sweden. It is the site of the Middelgrunden wind farm and the Middelgrundsfortet.

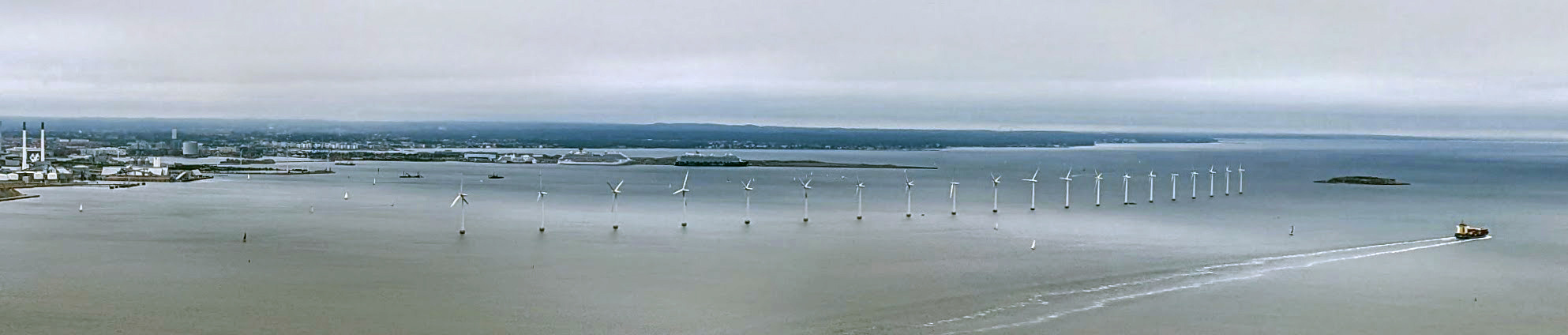
Aerial view with the wind farm and the fort, and Copenhagen in the background
