= Nysted Wind Farm =

Danish offshore wind farm

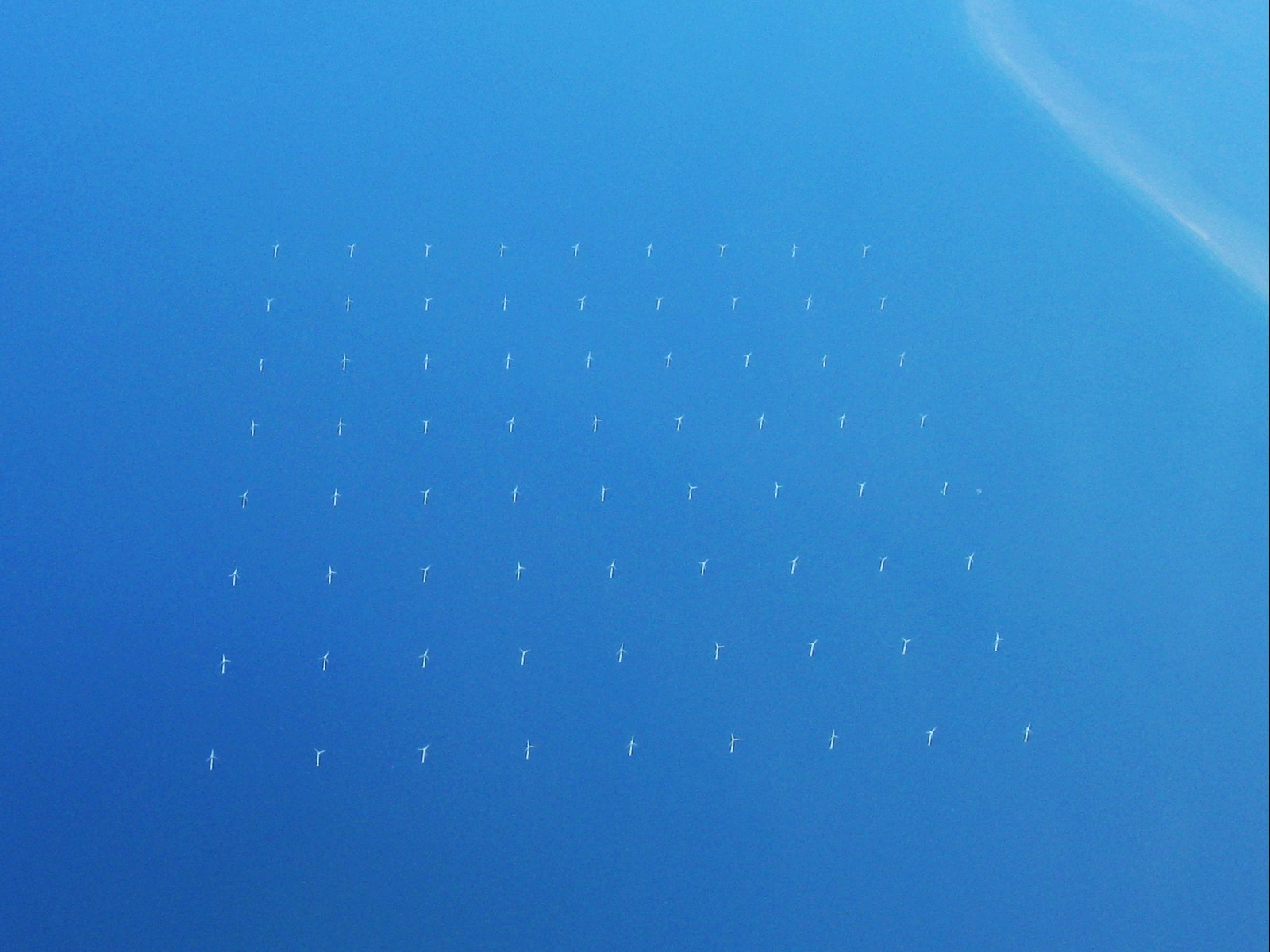
- Country: Denmark
- Location: South of Lolland
- Coordinates: 54°33′0″N 11°42′36″E
- Status: Operational
- Commission date: 2003
- Construction cost: about EUR 600 million
- Owners: Ørsted, PensionDanmark

Wind farm
- Type: Offshore

Power generation
- Units operational: 162 × 2.3 MW (Siemens)
- Make and model: Siemens Wind Power
- Nameplate capacity: 166 MW (Rødsand I); 207 MW (Rødsand II); 383MW total
- Annual net output: 1,370 GW·h

External links
- Commons: Related media on Commons

Wind farm layout

Offshore turbine, used in Nysted Wind Farm

The Nysted Wind Farm (also known as Rødsand) is a Danish offshore wind farm close to the Rødsand sand bank near Lolland. Gravity base foundations are used rather than piles due to ice conditions.

== Rødsand I ==
Rødsand I was built in 2003, with 72 turbines and a total capacity of 166 MW, and was the largest in the world until 2007. Annual production is some 570 GW·h, the equivalent to the electricity consumption of 140,000 Danish homes, which could save 500,000 tonnes of CO_{2} emissions. Turbines were installed by A2SEA. It receives 45 øre per kW·h for the first 42,000 full-load hours, which is about 11 years.

Rødsand I was out for 4 1/2 months in 2007 when the main transformer suffered a malfunction, causing a production loss of 23 million DKK per month.

In September 2010, DONG bought E.ON's 20% share and sold half of the entire project to pension fund PensionDanmark for 700 million kroner (€94 million / US$120 million) — almost half the DKK1,600 million cost. Stadtwerke Lübeck also owns a share.

As of 2013 it has an availability of 97 percent.

== Rødsand II ==
In 2010, a 207 MW extension of the existing wind farm was installed by E.ON at a stated cost of EUR450m and a power purchase agreement at DKK 0.629 per kW·h (US$0.12/kW·h). It was originally scheduled to be completed in 2011, but installation happened faster than projected, and on 15 July 2010, E.ON reported that all turbines had been installed and the majority were supplying power to the Danish grid. On 3 August, E.ON reported that the wind farm was ready and went into operation, three months ahead of schedule. Rødsand 2 was inaugurated on 12 October.

In November 2013, local power company SEAS-NVE bought 80% of Rødsand 2 for a price of DKK 2.8 billion and thus valuating the wind farm at DKK 3.5 billion.

== See also ==
- Wind power in Denmark
- List of offshore wind farms in Denmark
- List of wind farms
- List of offshore wind farms
- List of offshore wind farms in the Baltic Sea
