= Lists of wind farms =

Lists of wind farms include:

- List of onshore wind farms
- List of offshore wind farms

== Wind farms by country ==
- List of wind farms in Australia
- List of wind farms in Canada
- List of wind farms in China
- List of wind farms in Denmark
- List of wind farms in India
- List of wind farms in Iran
- List of wind farms in Japan
- List of wind farms in Jordan
- List of wind farms in Kosovo
- List of wind farms in Latvia
- List of wind farms in Lithuania
- List of wind farms in Morocco
- List of wind farms in the Republic of Ireland
- List of wind farms in Romania
- List of wind farms in South Africa
- List of wind farms in Sri Lanka
- List of wind farms in Sweden
- List of wind farms in Turkey
- List of wind farms in the United Kingdom
- List of wind farms in the United States
- List of wind farms in Uruguay

== Offshore wind farms by country ==
- List of offshore wind farms in China
- List of offshore wind farms in Denmark
- List of offshore wind farms in Germany
- List of offshore wind farms in Japan
- List of offshore wind farms in the Netherlands
- List of offshore wind farms in Sweden
- List of offshore wind farms in the United Kingdom
- List of offshore wind farms in the United States

== Offshore wind farms by body of water ==
- List of offshore wind farms in the Baltic Sea
- List of offshore wind farms in the Irish Sea
- List of offshore wind farms in the North Sea

== See also ==
- Category:Lists of wind farms
