= Middelgrunden wind farm =

Danish offshore wind farm

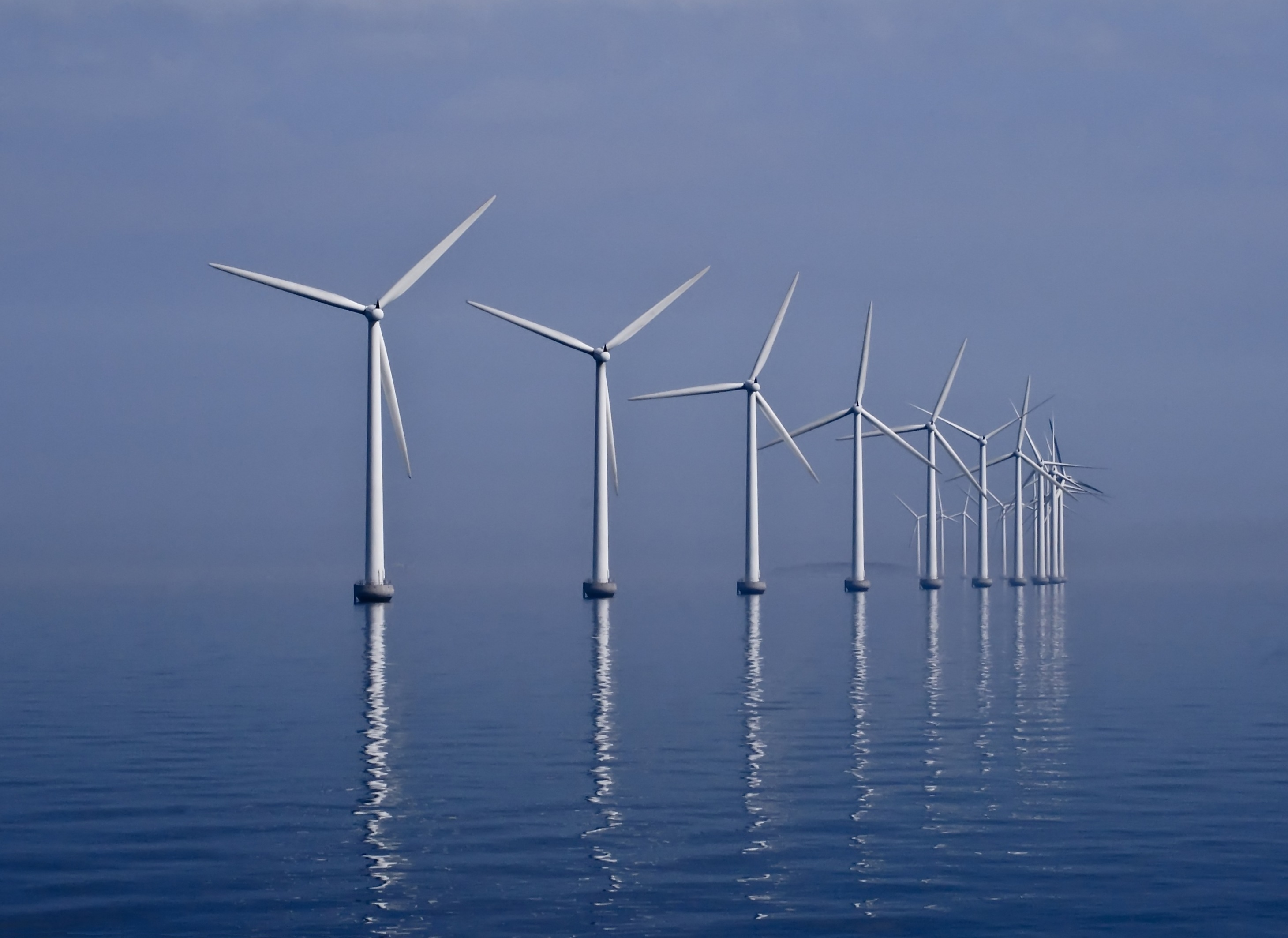
- Official name: Middelgrundens Vindmøllepark
- Country: Denmark
- Coordinates: 55°41′27″N 12°40′13″E
- Status: Operational
- Commission date: 2001

Wind farm
- Type: Offshore
- Rotor diameter: 76

Power generation
- Units operational: 20
- Make and model: Bonus B76/2000 kW
- Nameplate capacity: 40 MW

External links
- Website: www.middelgrunden.dk
- Commons: Related media on Commons

Wind turbine locations

The Middelgrunden wind farm stands on the shoal Middelgrunden, between shipping lanes in the Øresund, 3.5 km outside Copenhagen, Denmark. When it was built in 2000, it was the world's largest offshore farm, with 20 turbines (2 MW Bonus each) and a capacity of 40 MW. The farm delivers about 4% of the power for Copenhagen.

In 1996, the project was initiated by the Copenhagen Environment and Energy Office (CEEO) after Middelgrunden had been listed as a potential site in the Danish Action Plan for Offshore Wind. Together with the CEEO a group of local people formed the Middelgrunden Wind Turbine Cooperative and established a cooperation with Copenhagen Energy, the local electric utility. The proposed location was initially opposed by the Danish Society for Nature Conservation, but this decision was later changed. Concrete gravity base foundations were chosen as the cheapest option.

This project is an example for community wind energy. It is 50% owned by the 10,000 investors in the Middelgrunden Wind Turbine Cooperative, and 50% by the municipal utility company. It is clearly visible from the capital of Denmark.

== Gallery ==
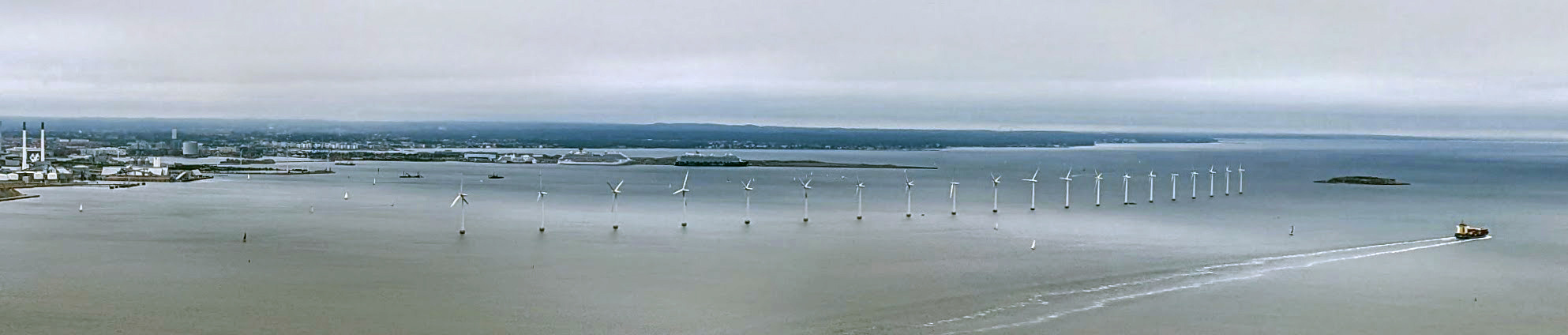
Aerial view on landing at Copenhagen Airport on an overcast day.

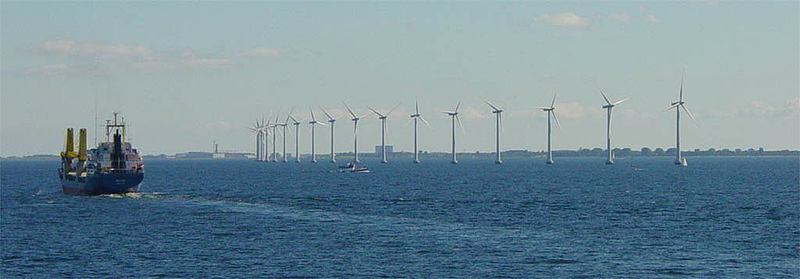
Wind often flows briskly and smoothly over water since there are no obstructions, which is why the location was chosen. The large and slow turning turbines of this offshore wind farm near Copenhagen take advantage of the moderate yet constant breezes at this location. While the wind at this location is not strong it is very consistent, with the turbines generating substantial power over 97 percent of the time.

== See also ==
- List of offshore wind farms in Denmark
- List of offshore wind farms in the Baltic Sea
