= Watt =

SI derived unit of power

watt
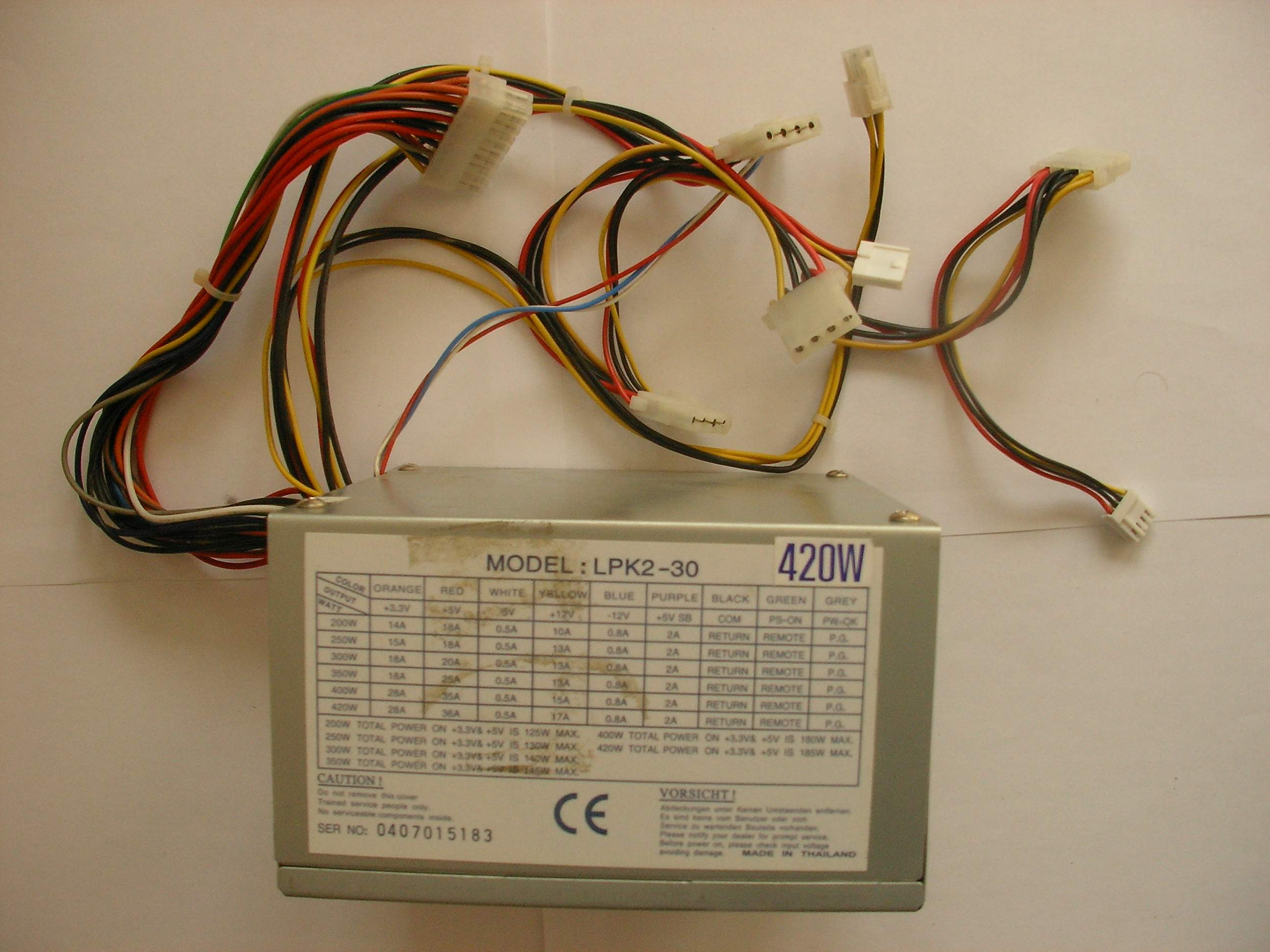
- A 420-watt power supply

General information
- Unit system: SI
- Unit of: power
- Symbol: W
- Named after: James Watt

Conversions
1 W in ...	... is equal to ...
- SI base units: 1 kg⋅m^{2}⋅s^{−3}
- CGS units: 10^{7} erg⋅s^{−1}
- English Engineering Units: 0.7375621 ft⋅lbf/s = 0.001341022 hp

The watt (symbol: W) is the unit of power or radiant flux in the International System of Units (SI), equal to 1 joule per second or 1 kg⋅m^{2}⋅s^{−3}. It is used to quantify the rate of energy transfer. The watt is named in honor of James Watt (1736–1819), an 18th-century Scottish inventor, mechanical engineer, and chemist who in 1776 improved the Newcomen engine with his own steam engine, which became fundamental for the Industrial Revolution.

== Overview ==
When an object's velocity is held constant at one meter per second against a constant opposing force of one newton, the rate at which work is done is one watt.
$$\mathrm{1 ~ W = 1 ~ J {/} s = 1 ~ N {\cdot} m {/} s = 1 ~ kg {\cdot} m^2 {\cdot} s^{-3}}.$$

In terms of electromagnetism, one watt is the rate at which electrical work is performed when a current of one ampere (A) flows across an electrical potential difference of one volt (V), meaning the watt is equivalent to the volt-ampere (the latter unit, however, is used for a different quantity from the real power of an electrical circuit).
$$\mathrm{1 ~ W = 1 ~ V {\cdot} A}.$$

Two additional unit conversions for watt can be found using the above equation and Ohm's law.
$$\mathrm{1 ~ W = 1 ~ V^2 / \Omega = 1 ~ A^2 {\cdot} \Omega},$$
where ohm ($\Omega$) is the SI derived unit of electrical resistance.

=== Examples ===
- A person having a mass of 100 kg who climbs a 3-meter-high ladder in 5 seconds is doing work at a rate of about 600 watts. Mass times acceleration due to gravity times height divided by the time it takes to lift the object to the given height gives the rate of doing work or power. (Note: The energy in climbing the stairs is given by mgh. Setting m = 100 kg, g = 9.8 m/s^{2} and h = 3 m gives 2940 J. Dividing this by the time taken (5 s) gives a power of 588 W.)
- A laborer over the course of an eight-hour day can sustain an average output of about 75 watts; higher power levels can be achieved for short intervals and by athletes.

== History ==
The watt is named after the Scottish inventor James Watt. The unit name was proposed by C. William Siemens in August 1882 in his President's Address to the Fifty-Second Congress of the British Association for the Advancement of Science. Noting that units in the practical system of units were named after leading physicists, Siemens proposed that watt might be an appropriate name for a unit of power. Siemens defined the unit within the existing system of practical units as "the power conveyed by a current of an Ampère through the difference of potential of a Volt".

In October 1908, at the International Conference on Electric Units and Standards in London, so-called international definitions were established for practical electrical units. Siemens' definition was adopted as the international watt. (Also used: 1 A^{2} × 1 Ω.) The watt was defined as equal to 10^{7} units of power in the practical system of units. The "international units" were dominant from 1909 until 1948. After the 9th General Conference on Weights and Measures in 1948, the international watt was redefined from practical units to absolute units (i.e., using only length, mass, and time). Concretely, this meant that 1 watt was defined as the quantity of energy transferred in a unit of time, namely 1 J/s. In this new definition, 1 absolute watt = 1.00019 international watts. Texts written before 1948 are likely to be using the international watt, which implies caution when comparing numerical values from this period with the post-1948 watt. In 1960, the 11th General Conference on Weights and Measures adopted the absolute watt into the International System of Units (SI) as the unit of power.

== Multiples ==
SI multiples of watt (W)
Submultiples			Multiples		
Value	SI symbol	Name	Value	SI symbol	Name
10^{−1} W	dW	deciwatt	10^{1} W	daW	decawatt
10^{−2} W	cW	centiwatt	10^{2} W	hW	hectowatt
10^{−3} W	**mW**	**milliwatt**	10^{3} W	**kW**	**kilowatt**
10^{−6} W	**μW**	**microwatt**	10^{6} W	**MW**	**megawatt**
10^{−9} W	**nW**	**nanowatt**	10^{9} W	**GW**	**gigawatt**
10^{−12} W	**pW**	**picowatt**	10^{12} W	**TW**	**terawatt**
10^{−15} W	**fW**	**femtowatt**	10^{15} W	**PW**	**petawatt**
10^{−18} W	aW	attowatt	10^{18} W	EW	exawatt
10^{−21} W	zW	zeptowatt	10^{21} W	ZW	zettawatt
10^{−24} W	yW	yoctowatt	10^{24} W	YW	yottawatt
10^{−27} W	rW	rontowatt	10^{27} W	RW	ronnawatt
10^{−30} W	qW	quectowatt	10^{30} W	QW	quettawatt
Common multiples are in **bold** face

Attowatt
The sound intensity in water corresponding to the international standard reference sound pressure of 1 μPa is approximately 0.65 aW/m^{2}.
Femtowatt
Powers measured in femtowatts are typically found in references to radio and radar receivers. For example, meaningful FM tuner performance figures for sensitivity, quieting and signal-to-noise require that the RF energy applied to the antenna input be specified. These input levels are often stated in dBf (decibels referenced to 1 femtowatt). This is 0.2739 microvolts across a 75-ohm load or 0.5477 microvolt across a 300-ohm load; the specification takes into account the RF input impedance of the tuner.
Picowatt
Powers measured in picowatts are typically used in reference to radio and radar receivers, acoustics and in the science of radio astronomy. One picowatt is the international standard reference value of sound power when this quantity is expressed in decibels.
Nanowatt
Powers measured in nanowatts are also typically used in reference to radio and radar receivers.
Microwatt
Powers measured in microwatts are typically stated in medical instrumentation systems such as the electroencephalograph (EEG) and the electrocardiograph (ECG), in a wide variety of scientific and engineering instruments, and in reference to radio and radar receivers. Compact solar cells for devices such as calculators and watches are typically measured in microwatts.
Milliwatt
A typical laser pointer outputs about five milliwatts of light power, whereas a typical hearing aid uses less than one milliwatt. Audio signals and other electronic signal levels are often measured in dBm, referenced to one milliwatt.
Watt
PC power supply units are typically specified in watts; modern graphics cards usually have TDPs of a few hundred watts.
Kilowatt

The kilowatt is typically used to express the output power of engines and the power of electric motors, tools, machines, and heaters. It is also a common unit used to express the electromagnetic power output of broadcast radio and television transmitters.
One kilowatt is approximately equal to 1.34 horsepower. A small electric heater with one heating element can use 1 kilowatt. The average electric power consumption of a household in the United States is about 1 kilowatt. (Note: Average household electric power consumption is 1.19 kW in the US, 0.53 kW in the UK. In India it is 0.13 kW (urban) and 0.03 kW (rural) – computed from GJ figures quoted by Nakagami, Murakoshi and Iwafune.)
A surface area of 1 square meter on Earth receives typically about one kilowatt of sunlight from the Sun (the solar irradiance) (on a clear day at midday, close to the equator).
Megawatt
Many events or machines produce or sustain the conversion of energy on this scale, including large electric motors; large warships, aircraft carriers, cruisers, and submarines; large server farms or data centers; and some scientific research equipment, such as supercolliders, and the output pulses of very large lasers. A large residential or commercial building may use several megawatts in electric power. On railways, modern high-powered electric locomotives typically have a peak power output of 5 or 6 MW, while some produce much more. The Eurostar e300, for example, uses more than 12 MW, while heavy diesel–electric locomotives typically produce and use 3 and 5 MW. U.S. nuclear power plants have net summer capacities between about 500 and 1300 MW.
The earliest citing of the megawatt in the Oxford English Dictionary (OED) is a reference in the 1900 Webster's International Dictionary of the English Language. The OED also states that megawatt appeared in a November 28, 1947, article in the journal Science (506:2).

A United States Department of Energy video explaining gigawatts

Gigawatt
A gigawatt is typical the annually averaged power consumption for a city of 1.8 million inhabitants, and is the output of a large power station. The gigawatt is thus used for large power plants, power grids, and, increasingly, large data centers. For example, by the end of 2010, power shortages in China's Shanxi province were expected to increase to 5–6 GW and the installation capacity of wind power in Germany was 25.8 GW. The largest unit (out of four) of the Belgian Doel Nuclear Power Station has a peak output of 1.04 GW. HVDC converters have been built with power ratings of up to 2 GW.
Terawatt
The primary energy used by humans worldwide was about 160,000 terawatt-hours in 2019, corresponding to an average continuous power consumption of 18 TW that year. Earth itself emits 47±2 TW, far less than the energy received from solar radiation. The most powerful lasers from the mid-1960s to the mid-1990s produced power in terawatts, but only for nanosecond intervals. The average lightning strike peaks at 1 TW, but these strikes only last for 30 microseconds.
Petawatt
A petawatt can be produced by the current generation of lasers for time scales on the order of picoseconds. One such laser is Lawrence Livermore's Nova laser, which achieved a power output of 1.25 PW by a process called chirped pulse amplification. The duration of the pulse was roughly 0.5 ps, giving a total energy of 600 J. Another example is the Laser for Fast Ignition Experiments (LFEX) at the Institute of Laser Engineering (ILE), Osaka University, which achieved a power output of 2 PW for a duration of approximately 1 ps.
Based on the average total solar irradiance of 1.361 kW/m^{2}, the total power of sunlight striking Earth's atmosphere is estimated at 174 PW. The planet's average rate of global warming, measured as Earth's energy imbalance, reached about 0.5 PW (0.3% of incident solar power) by 2019.
Yottawatt
The power output of the Sun is 382.8 YW, about 2 billion times the power estimated to reach Earth's atmosphere.

== Conventions in the electric power industry ==
In the electric power industry, megawatt electrical (MWe or MW_{e}) refers by convention to the electric power produced by a generator, while megawatt thermal or thermal megawatt (MWt, MW_{t}, or MWth, MW_{th}) refers to thermal power produced by the plant and megawatt mechanical (MW_{m}) to mechanical power. For example, the Embalse nuclear power plant in Argentina uses a fission reactor to generate 2,109 MW_{t} (i.e. heat), which creates steam to drive a turbine, which generates 648 MW_{e} (i.e. electricity). Other SI prefixes are sometimes used, for example gigawatt electrical (GW_{e}). The International Bureau of Weights and Measures, which maintains the SI-standard, states that further information about a quantity should not be attached to the unit symbol but instead to the quantity symbol (e.g., P_{th} = 270 W rather than P = 270 W_{th}) and so these unit symbols are non-SI. In compliance with SI, the energy company Ørsted A/S uses the unit megawatt for produced electrical power and the equivalent unit megajoule per second for delivered heating power in a combined heat and power station such as Avedøre Power Station.

When describing alternating current (AC) electricity, another distinction is made between the watt and the volt-ampere. While these units are equivalent for simple resistive circuits, they differ when loads exhibit electrical reactance.

== Radio transmission ==
Radio stations usually report the power of their transmitters in units of watts, referring to the effective radiated power. This refers to the power that a half-wave dipole antenna would need to radiate to match the intensity of the transmitter's main lobe.

== Distinction between watts and watt-hours ==
The terms power and energy are closely related but distinct physical quantities. Power is the rate at which energy is generated or consumed and hence is measured in units (e.g. watts) that represent energy per unit time.

For example, when a light bulb with a power rating of 100W is turned on for one hour, the energy used is 100 watt hours (W·h), 0.1 kilowatt hour, or 360 kJ. This same amount of energy would light a 40-watt bulb for 2.5 hours, or a 50-watt bulb for 2 hours.

Power stations are rated using units of power, typically megawatts or gigawatts (for example, the Three Gorges Dam in China is rated at approximately 22 gigawatts). This reflects the maximum power output it can achieve at any point in time. A power station's annual energy output, however, would be recorded using units of energy (not power), typically gigawatt hours. Major energy production or consumption is often expressed as terawatt hours for a given period; often a calendar year or financial year. One terawatt hour of energy is equal to a sustained power delivery of one terawatt for one hour, or approximately 114 megawatts for a period of one year:

Power output = energy / time

1 terawatt hour per year = 1×10^{12} W·h / (365 days × 24 hours per day) ≈ 114 million watts,

equivalent to approximately 114 megawatts of constant power output.

The watt-second is a unit of energy, equal to the joule. One kilowatt hour is 3,600,000 watt seconds.

While a watt per hour is a unit of rate of change of power with time, (Note: Watts per hour refers to the rate of change of power being used (or generated). For example, a power plant that changes its power output from 100 MW to 200 MW in 15 minutes would have a ramp-up rate of 400 MW/h. Gigawatts per hour are used to characterize the ramp-up required of the power plants on an electric grid to compensate for loss of output from other sources, such as when solar power generation drops to zero as the sun sets. See duck curve.) it is not correct to refer to a watt (or watt-hour) as a watt per hour.

== See also ==
- Kibble balance (formerly known as a watt balance)
- Nominal power (photovoltaic)
- One Watt Initiative
- Power factor
- Solar constant
- Wattage conversion factors
- Wattmeter
