= Geothermal power in Denmark =

Denmark has two active geothermal district heating plants, one in Thisted which started in 1988, and one in Aarhus, started in 2025.

Two others have stopped working. A facility in Sønderborg failed in 2018 due to silting. One in Copenhagen started in 2005, and stopped in 2019.

The underground temperature is under 100 °C (212 °F), reducing thermodynamic efficiency so electricity production is not feasible. Their geothermal heating is used as heat input to electric heat pumps (consuming grid electricity) to heat buildings.

== See also ==
- Renewable energy in Denmark
- Wind power in Denmark
- Solar Power in Denmark
- Biofuel in Denmark
- Renewable energy by country
