= Wind power in Denmark =

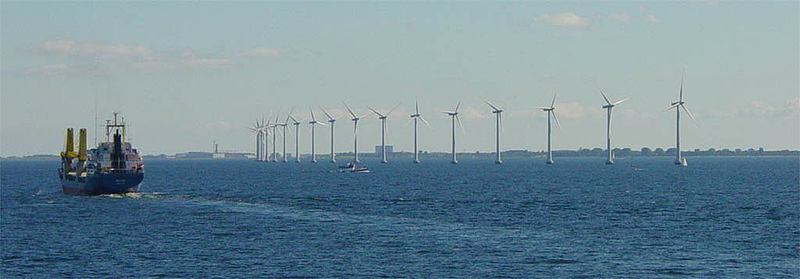
Middelgrunden offshore wind park, 3.5 km outside Copenhagen. When built in 2000, it was the world's largest.

Denmark was a pioneer in developing commercial wind power during the 1970s, and today a substantial share of the wind turbines around the world are produced by Danish manufacturers such as Vestas—the world's largest wind-turbine manufacturer—along with many component suppliers. Furthermore, Denmark has—as of 2022—the world's 2nd highest amount of wind power generation capacity installed per capita, behind only neighboring Sweden.

In 2024, wind power made up 59.3% of total electricity generation in Denmark, up from 56% in 2020, 20% in 2010 and 11% in 2000. This contributes to the government's target of 100% renewable power generation by 2030.

Denmark had the 4th best energy architecture performance in the world in 2017 according to the World Economic Forum, and the second best energy security in the world in 2019 according to the World Energy Council.

== History ==
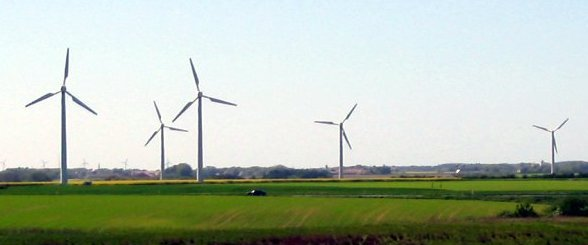
Wind turbines in Vendsyssel, 2004

Danish inventor Poul la Cour experimented, taught and constructed wind power projects around the year 1900.

As concerns over global warming grew in the 1980s, Denmark found itself with relatively high carbon dioxide emissions per capita, primarily due to the coal-fired electrical power plants that had become the norm after the 1973 and 1979 energy crises. Renewable energy became the natural choice for Denmark, decreasing both dependence on other countries for energy and global warming pollution.

Many countries tried to subsidise green technology such as wind power, and most failed to make it a viable industry. The Danish system was an exception, providing 30% of initial capital cost in the early years which was gradually reduced to zero, but still maintaining a feed-in tariff. The capital cost subsidy was reduced to 20% in June 1985, when wind turbines received DKK 50 million per year. Other renewable energy forms received 37 million. The research institution Teknologisk Institut identified many specific improvement needs, pushing development from ad hoc to systemised solutions.

On 29 March 1985, one year before the Chernobyl disaster, the Danes passed a law forbidding the construction of nuclear power plants. In the process, the Danish grassroots movement had a substantial role. The Danish Anti-nuclear Movement's (OOA) smiling-sun logo "Atomkraft, Nej Tak" ("Nuclear Power, No Thanks") spread worldwide, and the renewable alternatives were promoted by the Danish Organisation for Renewable Energy (OVE).

Denmark adopted a target of cutting carbon emissions by 22% from 1988 levels by 2005. Planning of wind power was deliberately streamlined by authorities to minimise hurdles.

=== Policy measures ===
In June 2005, the Danish government published Energy Strategy 2025, which replaced the previous strategy from 1996. The strategy formulates policy projects that are intended to accelerate the expansion of wind power and restructure the electricity market.

The Danish government also succeeded in drawing up energy agreements from 2008 to 2011 with broad-based support, which included the most far-reaching and effective programs for the expansion of wind energy to date. The parties agreed that the share of renewable energies in Danish energy consumption should be 20% in 2011. The price for wind energy was also increased in the agreement. The parties also agreed to construct new offshore wind turbines with a capacity of 400 MW by 2012. The agreement introduced a compensation scheme for residents living near wind turbines, a scheme for purchase rights and a guarantee fund.

After the government expressed the long-term vision of a Denmark 100% independent of reliance on fossil fuels during the current agreement, in independent commission on climate change policy proposed detailed recommendations in September 2010 on how this vision can be achieved. This led to Energy Strategy 2050 a year later. The strategy consists of three tracks, as one of them focusses on more renewable energy with onshore and offshore wind power. It included tenders for over 1000 MW in offshore including Kriegers Flak in the Baltic Sea. Kriegers Flak is also used to connect Denmark and Germany with a 400MW cable, through the German Baltic 2 Offshore Wind Farm, and it is the wind farm with the lowest guaranteed price (øre/kWh) for large offshore wind farms in Denmark. In addition, the distance requirements for wind turbines were evaluated and revised. Such subsidies as compensation schemes for residents living near onshore windmills lost relevance and the offshore area was taken into focus.

Ever since the first energy agreement with outstanding consensus in parliament in 2008, Denmark grew their wind power share in domestic electricity production from 19% to 55% in 2019.

For the policy approach, one may note the adoption of incrementalism that helps this to be developed ahead of other more rational approaches such as those adopted by USA and UK. See the use of Wind Power development in the example section of Incrementalism.

== Wind resources ==
External images
- Wind map of Denmark Archive
- Today's wind power production
- Tomorrow's wind power prognosis, by Nord Pool Spot.
- Current power system data, provided by Energinet.dk
- Current power system data, provided by EMD
- Last 2 weeks of power system data

Denmark has relatively modest average wind speeds in the range of 4.9–5.6 m/s measured at 10 m height. Onshore wind resources are highest in the western part of the country, and on the eastern islands with coastlines facing south or west. Wind is higher in autumn and winter and lower in summer, and Denmark also has about 2.3 GW of solar power. The country has very large offshore wind resources, and large areas of sea territory with a shallow water depth of 5–15 m, where siting is most feasible. These sites offer higher wind speeds, in the range of roughly 8.5–9.0 m/s at 50 m height. There have been no major problems from wind variability, although there is a temporary problem resulting from the connection of a large bloc of wind power from offshore wind farms to a single point on a weak section of the transmission network. The wind resource over Denmark was mapped in 1999 by EMD International A/S and Risø National Laboratory. The mapping was made using a 200 m grid resolution using the models in WindPRO and WAsP. The results were validated on more than 1200 wind turbines nationwide.

Denmark is connected by transmission line to other European countries (e.g. Cross-Skagerrak) at an electricity interconnection level (transmission capacity relative to production capacity) of 44% in 2015, and increased since then. Denmark has also retained 6 GW of its traditional power plants, therefore it does not need to install additional peak-load plants to balance its wind power. Instead, it purchases additional power from its neighbours when necessary. With some strengthening of the grid, Denmark plans to increase wind's share even further. In 2010 the plan was to reach 50% of consumption in 2020 (which was almost met), and up to 84% in 2035.

Analysts expect the cost of wind power to be 30 øre/kWh and its handling cost to be 15 øre/kWh, being lower than coal and natural gas at 55 øre/kWh minimum. Due to their inability to follow load wind power gets a lower price.

== Consumption related to wind power ==
Danish district heating plants use 100 petajoule/year, but little of this consumption is from 180 MW of electrode boilers installed in powerplants or 374 MW of large heat pumps. The boilers are only used to soak up the powerplant's own electricity when prices are negative, to avoid paying tax. Expansion of wind powered district heating is calculated to be economically efficient without taxes.

The number of household heat pumps has stalled at 70,000 in 2015 due to tax-free wood pellets, and the goal of 300,000 small heat pumps in 2035 is unlikely to be reached, reducing the value of more wind power unless electricity tax is reduced.

== Installed capacities and production ==
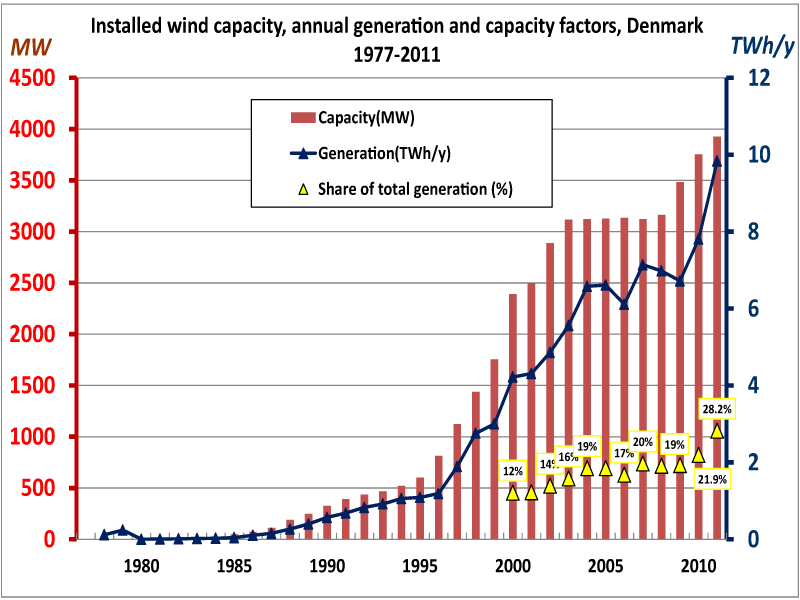
Wind power in Denmark

Wind power installed capacity and generation in Denmark

As of 2023, the total installed wind power capacity in Denmark was 7,510 MW, of which 4,860 MW were onshore and 2,650 MW were offshore.

At the end of 2015, Denmark's total installed capacity for wind power stood at 5,070 MW.

Denmark has the highest proportion of wind power in the world. In 2015, Denmark produced 42% of electricity from wind, up from the 2014 record of 39% of total power consumption. For the month of January 2014, that share was over 61%. The month of lowest wind power share was July at 23%. Denmark also had 548 MW of solar power (790 MW in late 2015). A peak generation period occurred on 21 December 2013 when the wind share was 102%, and for 1 hour the share was 135%.

In 2005, Denmark had an installed wind power capacity of 3,127 MW, which produced 23,810 TJ (6.6 TW·h) of energy, giving an actual average production of 755 MW at a capacity factor of 24%. In 2009, Denmark's wind capacity grew to 3,482 MW; most of the increase came from the 209 MW Horns Rev 2 offshore wind farm, which was inaugurated on 17 September 2009 by Crown Prince Frederik. In 2010, capacity grew to 3,752 MW, and most of the year's increase came from the Rødsand II off-shore wind farm.

On 22 March 2012, a coalition of parties representing 95% of all members of the Danish parliament agreed that the Danish state would increase the country's offshore wind capacity by 1,500 MW. The 1,500 MW extra capacity was achieved by constructing several offshore wind farms; the 400 MW Anholt wind farm in 2014, the 407 MW Horns Rev 3 in the North Sea at 77 øre/kWh in 2019, and the Kriegers Flak at 37.2 øre/kWh with a capacity of 600 MW in the Baltic Sea close to the borders of Germany and Sweden in 2021. Kriegers Flak is also used to connect Denmark and Germany with a 400MW cable, through the German Baltic 2 Offshore Wind Farm, and Energinet ordered electrical equipment in early 2016. Eight groups applied for pre-qualification for Kriegers Flak, of which 7 were approved – 3 more than the 4 companies approved to compete for Horns Rev 3, both having more bidders than the single bidder for Anholt. By 2018, Danish offshore wind farms had average 40% capacity factor. Newer farms had higher CF than older.

Offshore operators are required to secure a decommissioning fee.

Wind power output reduces spot market prices in general via the Merit Order effect; in 2008 this caused a net reduction of pre-tax electricity prices (balancing the increase from the feed-in law).

=== Statistics ===
Wind power net electricity generation (GWh) 2007–2019
Wind power net electricity generation 2007–2014

External image
- Grid stability and wind share

Installed wind capacity, production, share in Denmark by year
Year	1970	1971	1972	1973	1974	1975	1976	1977	1978	1979
Installed wind capacity (kW)								52	813	1,090
Electricity generated (MW·h)									120	240
Average capacity factor (%)								—N/a	1.7	2.5
Year	1980	1981	1982	1983	1984	1985	1986	1987	1988	1989
Installed wind capacity (MW)	2.7	6.3	10.6	14.3	19.8	47.0	72.4	111.9	190.3	246.7
Electricity generated (GW·h)	2	5	12	19	26	44	104	154	266	398
Average capacity factor (%)	8.5	9.1	12.9	15.2	15.0	10.7	16.4	15.7	16.0	18.4
Year	1990	1991	1992	1993	1994	1995	1996	1997	1998	1999
Installed wind capacity (MW)	326	393	436	468	521	600	814	1,123	1,438	1,753
Electricity generated (TW·h)	0.57	0.68	0.83	0.92	1.06	1.09	1.19	1.89	2.76	3.00
Average capacity factor (%)	20.0	19.8	21.7	22.4	23.2	20.7	16.7	19.2	21.9	19.5
Year	2000	2001	2002	2003	2004	2005	2006	2007	2008	2009
Installed wind capacity (MW)	2,390	2,497	2,890	3,116	3,123	3,127	3,135	3,124	3,163	3,482
Electricity generated (TW·h)	4.22	4.31	4.86	5.56	6.58	6.61	6.11	7.14	6.98	6.72
Average capacity factor (%)	20.2	19.7	19.2	20.4	24.1	24.1	22.2	26.1	25.2	22.0
Wind power share in the electricity supply (%)	12.1	12.2	13.9	15.8	18.5	18.5	16.8	19.7	19.1	19.3
Year	2010	2011	2012	2013	2014	2015	2016	2017	2018	2019
Installed wind capacity (MW)	3,752	3,927	4,162	4,792	4,855	5,070	5,229	5,475	6,131	6,128
Electricity generated (TW·h)	7.81	9.77	10.27	11.12	13.08	14.13	12.78	14.78	13.90	16.15
Average capacity factor (%)	23.8	28.4	28.2	26.5	30.8	31.8	27.9	30.8	25.9	30.1
Wind power share in domestic electricity production (%)	20.2	28.0	33.7	32.2	41.0	49.2	42.5	48.6	46.1	55.2
Year	2020	2021	2022	2023	2024					
Installed wind capacity (MW)	6,260	7,000	7,080	7,280	7,620					
Electricity generated (TW·h)	16.33	16.05	19.03	19.51	20.53					
Average capacity factor (%)	29.7	26.2	30.7	30.6	30.7					
Wind power share in domestic electricity production (%)	57.14	48.75	54.39	57.88	57.91					

Guaranteed prices (øre/kWh) for large offshore wind farms in Denmark

Horns Rev 1 (2002)	45.3
Rødsand I (2003)	45
Horns Rev 2 (2009)	51.8
Rødsand II (2010)	62.9
Anholt (2013)	105
Horns Rev 3 (2019)	77
Kriegers Flak (2021)	37.2
Vesterhav (2022)	47.5
Thor	0

_{52.41}

Current

Future

Average

The chart shows the minimum (guaranteed) price a plant receives during the FLH period in øre/kWh. Subsidy = guaranteed price minus market price. FLH=Full Load Hours; the amount of production the plant receives support for. After that, the plant usually receives market price. Transmission is included in the nearshore "Vesterhav", but not the other plants. The levels are usually below levels in Germany and UK.

=== Peak records ===
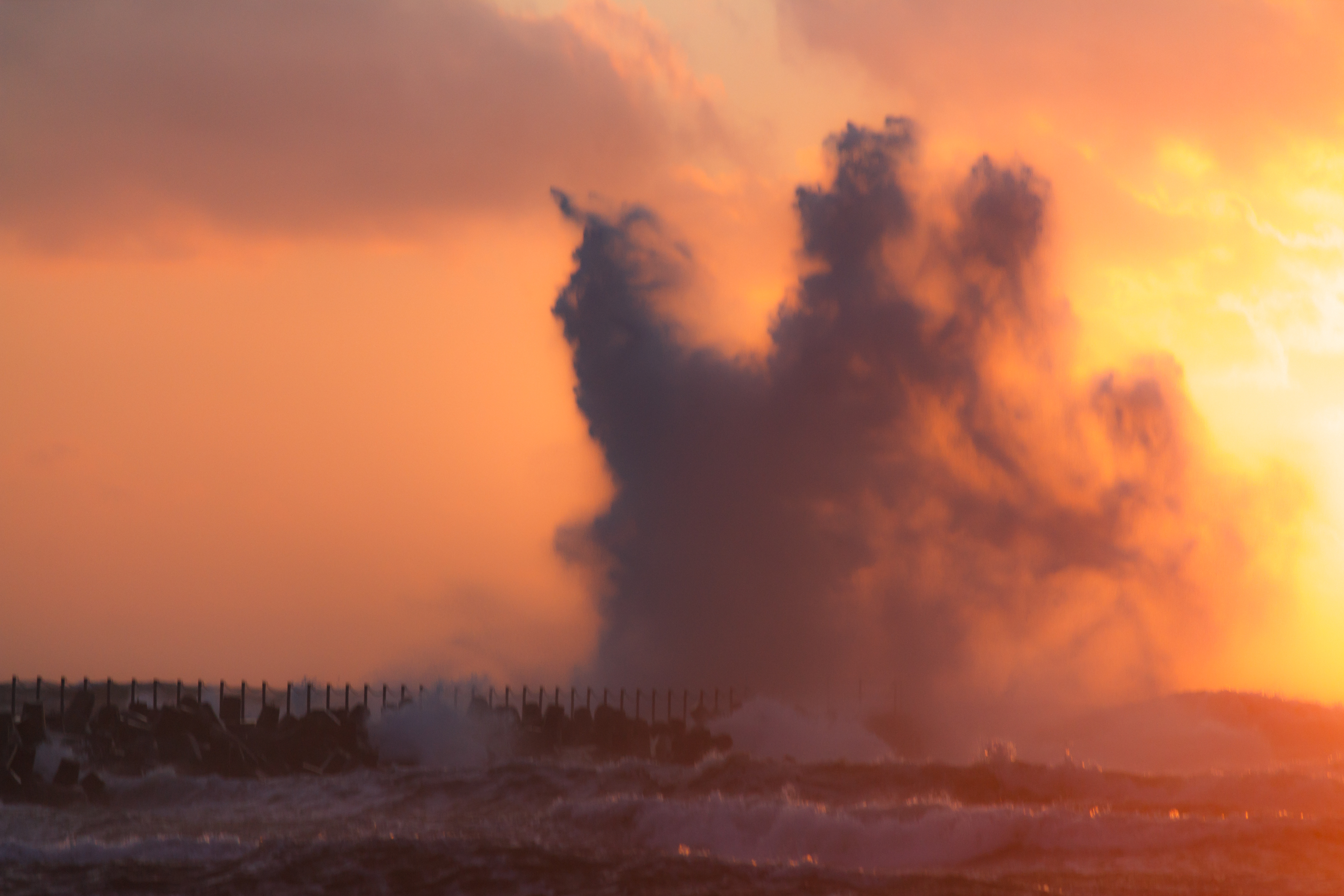
Breaking waves at the north sea coast of Denmark in the evening of 9 July 2015 as the new record in peak generation was reached.

As Denmark continues to install additional capacity, they continue to set new production records. This is a natural consequence of capacity growth. On 9 July 2015, in the evening, unusually strong wind conditions resulted in 116% of national electricity consumption being produced by wind farms and at 3 am the next morning at low demand, wind production exceeded 140% of current demand.

=== Future parks in Denmark ===
==== Offshore ====
The 1,000 MW Thor offshore wind (a $2.5 billion project scheduled for 2027 in the North Sea) was agreed in December 2021. 5 of 6 bidders bid the same price of 0.01 øre/kWh, and drew lots to find the winner (RWE) for a Contract for difference, which included connection costs and a potential DKK 2.8 billion (€377m) payment to the state. The similar bids raised questions about the suitability of the auction. Three days after the auction, the Parliament agreed on a further 2 GW offshore wind by 2031 due to the success of the Thor auction.

In early June 2023, an agreement was made by Germany and Denmark to link the Danish island of Bornholm's wind energy producing capacity to the mainland by the early 2030s, with a minimum capacity of 3 gigawatts.

==== Nearshore ====
External image
- Visualization of North Sea nearshore turbines, near Hvide Sande

In addition 6 nearshore wind farms with a total capacity of up to 450 MW are scheduled along with 50 MW of experimental offshore wind farms. The nearshore differ from conventional offshore in having the being close enough to the coast to have the transformer on land, decreasing cost. The first 350 MW were called for tenders in 2015, with a maximum price of 70 øre/kWh. Vattenfall bid the lowest price for the 350 MW nearshore farms at 47,5 øre/kWh in September 2016, but the political situation was unclear.

==== Onshore ====
In addition to the offshore projects, a further 500 MW additional net capacity of onshore windfarms is expected to be constructed until 2020. The 500 MW of additional net capacity is the expected result of the scrapping of 1,300 MW capacity from obsolete wind turbines combined with the simultaneous building of 1,800 MW capacity of modern wind turbines – a process also known as repowering.

=== Electricity exports from Denmark ===
In 2020, Denmark produced 16.3 TWh of wind power, of which 15 TWh (91.8%) were consumed in Denmark, measured hourly. A further 0.8 TWh of wind power were imported.

In 2017, annual wind power production corresponded to about 43% of electricity consumed in Denmark. The proportion of this that is actually consumed in Denmark has been disputed, as the larger hydropower resources of Norway (and to some extent, Sweden) is used as grid storage with low loss. Hydropower can rapidly reduce generation whenever wind farms are generating power, saving water for later, and can export electricity to Denmark when wind power output drops. Short term, Denmark imports electricity from Norway during daytime and exports in nighttime. Long term, Denmark imports electricity in summer and exports in winter. Wind is higher in autumn and winter, when consumption is also high. This service of timeshifting production and consumption is also found around the world in pumped-storage hydroelectricity balancing coal and nuclear plants.

For timeshifting trade with Norway, Denmark exports at DKK 157/MWh and imports at DKK 212/MWh. The correlation is low between wind power in Norway and Denmark. Market price sometimes falls to near or below zero, particularly in high winds and low consumption. In 2014, there were 46 hours with negative prices, costing DKK 37.7 million. In 2015, negative prices occurred in 65 hours in West Denmark and 36 hours in East Denmark – less than 1% of the time. Danish prices are mainly negative when German prices are even more negative; 90% of curtailment happens as a request from German power producers, and represents 2% (or DKK 80 million in 2018) of wind power production. In most years, curtailment mainly happened at thermal power plants, but became mostly by wind turbines in 2020. In 2019, Germany paid for curtailment of 420 GWh of Danish wind power, and the number increased to 1,463 GWh in 2020 (plus 1,066 GWh for thermal power), earning DKK 522 million.

The 24-hour period of 2 September 2015 was the first occasion when most electricity came from wind, and no central power plants were running in West Denmark, while grid stability was maintained by compensators.

Denmark is generally a transit country for electricity trade between the much larger markets in Norway, Sweden, Germany and Netherlands (COBRAcable), and plans to add cables to England (Viking Link) as well, further increasing the function of being a crossroads for electricity.

From 2005 to 2010, claims of up to 40% of wind power being exported have been made, countered by claims that only 1% was exported.

According to the first argument, power in excess of immediate demand is exported to neighbouring countries at lower prices. Part of the benefit of this goes to Denmark's northern neighbours: when Denmark exports power, it is sold at the spot market price which must be lower than at the importing market to be transmitted.

According to the second argument, the correlation between exports and wind power is weak, and a similar correlation exists with conventional thermal plants running partly for district heating; meanwhile, causal analysis shows that export from Denmark typically occurs as a consequence of the merit order effect, when large thermal plants have reserve capacities at times the spot market price of electricity is high.

In any case, the export price is the intermediate between the prices of the two areas, so the exporting TSO (Energinet) uses the profit to relieve tariffs at around DKK 500 million per year. Wind power organisations state that Denmark exports power at a higher price than it imports at.

== Economic conditions ==
=== Wind turbine industry ===
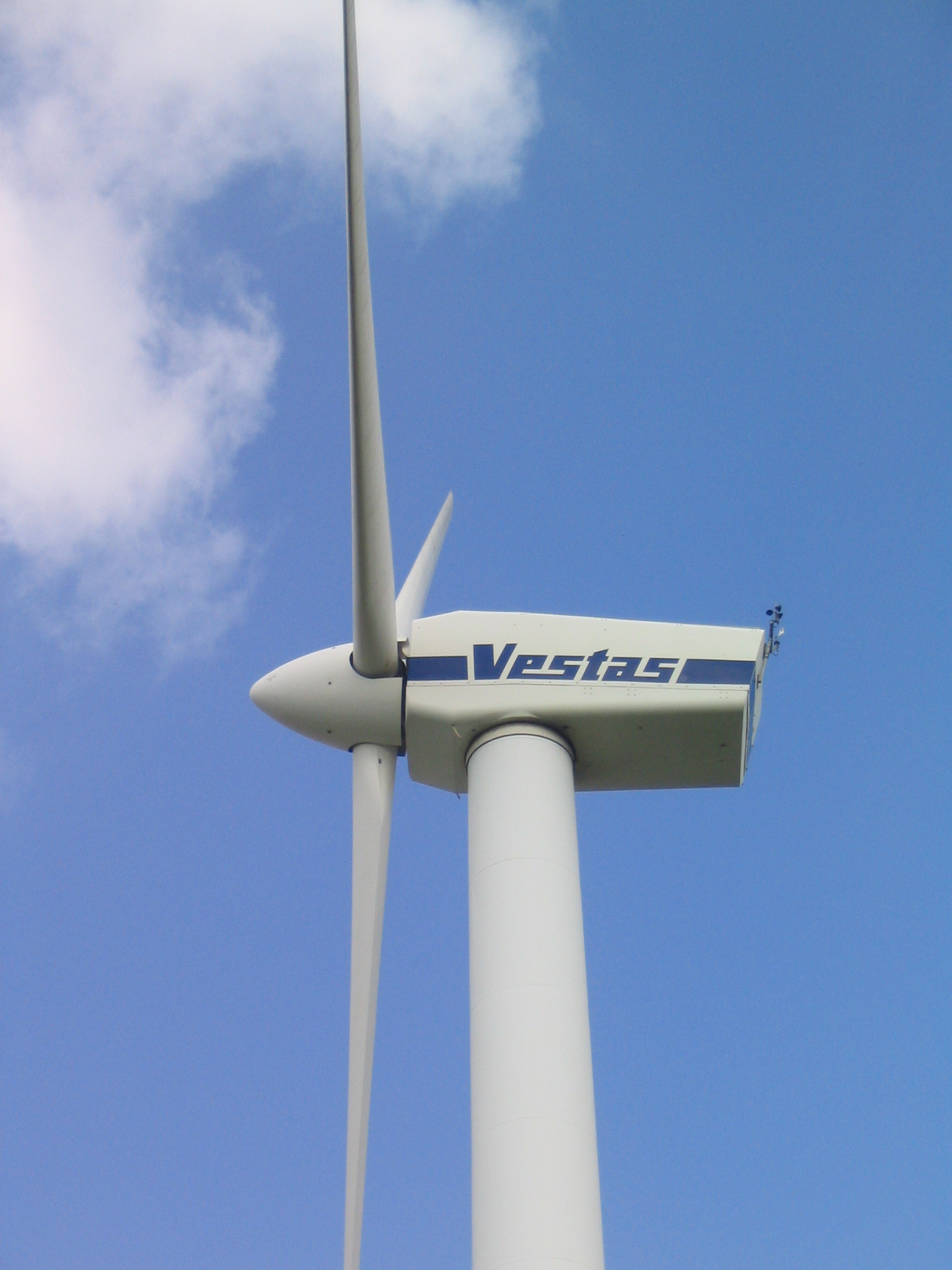
A Vestas wind turbine

The Danish wind turbine industry is the world's largest. Around 90% of the national output is exported, and Danish companies accounted for 38% of the world turbine market in 2003, when the industry employed some 20,000 people and had a turnover of around 3 billion euro. The return on investment dropped from near 20% before the 2008 financial crisis, to 10% some years later. The Danish wind turbine industry had a turnover of DKK 84 billion in 2014.

The biggest wind turbine manufacturers with production facilities in Denmark are Vestas and Siemens Wind Power.

The development of wind power in Denmark has been characterised by a close collaboration between publicly financed research and industry in key areas such as research and development, certification, testing, and the preparation of standards. For example, in the 1980s, a large number of small Danish companies were developing wind turbines to sell to California, and the Danish Risø laboratory provided test facilities and certification procedures. These resulted in reliable products and the rapid expansion of the Danish turbine manufacturing industry. Components are tested at LORC in Odense, and new large prototype turbines between 4–8 MW (including some non-Danish ones) are being tested at Østerild. Limited production turbines (four Siemens 7MW with 66kV cabling) are to be supported at Nissum Bredning at a cost of DKK 300m, partially financed by local people.

=== Danish wind economics ===
External images
- EU industry electricity prices
- EU household electricity prices

How price of consumer electricity is composed
1. Cost (32.0%)
2. PSO (9.00%)
3. Tolls and VAT (59.0%)

Denmark's electricity costs (including PSO; costs for cleaner energy) are average in the EU, but taxes increase the price to the highest in Europe. The tax money is a considerable income for the state, and changing the composition of the taxes towards a "greener" mix is difficult. According to a government official, the majority of taxes are not based on environment concerns, in contrast to the DKK 5 billion per year in PSO-money for cleaner energy, paid by electricity consumers to producers of clean electricity. These tolls are not available for government consumption.

Actual consumer-paid incentives (PSO) to new wind turbines depend on year of commission, but is generally around 25 øre (3.4 eurocent) per kWh for a limited number of hours, although support is discounted if combined price exceeds 58 øre/kWh. PSO is also used for biomass, solar, and district heating; total PSO was DKK 5.8 billion in 2013, of which DKK 3.2 billion went to wind power. In 2015, the cost of power was only 32% of the price, while PSO was 9%, and tolls and VAT the remaining 59%. In 2021, the Thor offshore contract was the first time a developer had to pay connection costs in Denmark, and also pay the state.

Wind power displaces coal, oil and gas to some degree, reducing running cost for fossil fuels. Consumption of coal was more than halved from 1990 to 2020. Wind power reduces price variability slightly.

Criticism

In 2009, the think tank Institute for Energy Research (IER) commissioned the Danish think-tank CEPOS (Centre for Political Studies) to report on electricity exports from Denmark and the economic impact of the Danish wind industry. The resulting report states that Danes pay the highest residential electricity rates in the European Union (mostly for government revenue, but partly to subsidise wind power), and that the cost of saving a ton of carbon dioxide between 2001 and 2008 has averaged 647 DKK (€87, US$124). It also estimated that 90% of wind industry jobs were transferred from other technology industries, and states that as a result Danish GDP is 1.8 billion DKK (US$270 million) lower than it would have been without wind industry subsidies of 1.7–2.6 billion DKK (roughly $320M – $480M) yearly in 2001–2005. The report was later heavily criticised. The Danish engineering magazine Ingeniøren claimed that the report was ordered and paid for by the American oil and coal lobby through IER. Later, several Danish researchers and professors from all technical universities in Denmark wrote a joint response to the report, refuting it. The report from CEPOS was even brought to government level, where minister of Climate and Energy Lykke Friis discredited the work done by CEPOS and the report. The World Nuclear Association estimates that the report was IER's response to US president Obama's 2009 Earth Day speech in Newton, Iowa, claiming that the United States could generate 20% of its electricity from wind by 2030, as Denmark already was.

=== Wind turbine cooperatives ===
To encourage investment in wind power, families were offered a tax exemption for generating their own electricity within their own or an adjoining municipality. While this could involve purchasing a turbine outright, more often families purchased shares in wind turbine cooperatives which in turn invested in community wind turbines. By 1996 there were around 2,100 such cooperatives in the country. Opinion polls show that this direct involvement has helped the popularity of wind turbines, with some 86% of Danes supporting wind energy when compared with existing fuel sources.

The role of wind turbine cooperatives is not limited to single turbines. The Middelgrunden offshore wind farm – with 20 turbines the world's largest offshore farm at the time it was built in 2000 – is 50% owned by the 10,000 investors in the Middelgrunden Wind Turbine Cooperative, and 50% by the municipal utility company, as is the Avedøre near-shore turbines.

By 2001 over 100,000 families belonged to wind turbine cooperatives, which had installed 86% of all the wind turbines in Denmark. By 2004 over 150,000 were either members or owned turbines, and about 5,500 turbines had been installed, although with greater private sector involvement the proportion owned by cooperatives had fallen to 75%. The cooperative model has also spread to Germany and the Netherlands.

==== Samsø Island ====
The island of Samsø erected 11 one-megawatt, land-based wind turbines in 2000, followed by ten offshore 2.3 MW wind turbines completed in 2003. Together with other renewable energy measures, this community of 4,200 achieved fame, claiming that it is the largest carbon neutral settlement on the planet. This claim exploits the general understanding that one can neglect carbon-dioxide and other pollution from fossil fuel consumption (cars, imported electricity, heating for houses, etc.), If the yearly average electricity production from sustained sources is higher than the total energy consumed. However, the government of Samsø is addressing the fossil fuel consumption issue in motoring – they've decided that all traffic on Samsø is to go electric.

== See also ==
- List of offshore wind farms in Denmark
- List of offshore wind farms in the North Sea
- List of offshore wind farms in the Baltic Sea
- Vestas V164
- Renewable energy in Denmark
- Energy in Denmark
- Electricity sector in Denmark
- Solar power in Denmark
- Biofuel in Denmark
- Hydrogen energy plant in Denmark
- Danish Organisation for Renewable Energy (OVE)
- Nordic energy market

== Bibliography ==
- Petersen, Flemming (2018). Da Danmark fik vinger: vindmøllehistorien 1978–2018 ISBN 8789270053, ISBN 9788789270050
- Boyle, Godfrey (2004). Renewable energy: Power for a sustainable future, Oxford University Press, ISBN 0-19-926178-4
