= Maurice Stanley Friedman =

American philosopher

Maurice Stanley Friedman (December 29, 1921 – September 25, 2012) was an interdisciplinary, interreligious philosopher of dialogue. His intellectual career spanned fifty years of study, teaching, writing, translating, traveling, and mentoring. He co-founded the Institute for Dialogical Psychotherapy. He is known for applying Martin Buber’s philosophy of dialogue to the human sciences. After receiving his Ph.D. in religion and history from the University of Chicago in 1950, Friedman had a long career of teaching and publishing.

== Early life ==
Friedman was born in Tulsa, Oklahoma. His father, Samuel Friedman, was a life-insurance salesman. His mother, Fannie, a Rabbi’s daughter, was a social activist and voracious reader who loved ideas and profoundly influenced her son. As a young man, he practiced Hindu-inspired meditation and was declared a conscientious objector during World War II. He served with the Forest Service as a firefighter. At the end of the war, Friedman attended and graduated from Harvard University. As he began his academic career, he married Eugenia and they adopted two children, Dvora and David. After they divorced, Friedman moved to the west coast and married Aileen.

== Writing career ==
One of Friedman's main contributions has been to articulate how dimensions (religious, literary, existentialist, sociological, and psychological) of Buber’s thought have reshaped the Human Sciences. Friedman was also a constructive philosopher and comparative religionist.

In 1956, Friedman wrote a broad survey of Buber’s work available at that time, Martin Buber: The Life of Dialogue, which was the first introduction of Buber’s concepts in the English-speaking world. Of it, Buber wrote: “To systematize a wild-grown thought as mine is, without impairing its elementary character seems to me a remarkable achievement.” He became friends with Elie Wiesel, a well-known Jewish author, and Abraham Joshua Heschel, a well-known Jewish religious philosopher. Throughout the rest of the 1950s and into the 1960s, Friedman’s English translations of Buber’s essays from the original German made them available in the United States for the first time.

Two of Friedman’s main contributions to comparative religious and philosophical studies are inevitably linked by dialogue – the "human image" and "touchstones of reality." The “human image” is described as an underlying dialogical attitude that calls us into being by pointing us towards meaningful choices between conflicting acts of values and as an ever-recurring unique response of our whole person to particular demand placed upon us. The metaphor “touchstones of reality” emerged from his dialogues with different great world religions. Touchstones represent unique meetings between ourselves and people or texts which drill deeply into our sense of humanness.

In 1984, along with Richard Hycner, Maurice Friedman co-founded the Institute for Dialogical Psychotherapy in San Diego. The Institute presented an approach to psychotherapy, which is not a “school” of psychotherapy as such. This approach may apply irrespective of the particular orientation toward therapy, or techniques utilized. It rests upon the belief that at the core of human existence, is interconnectedness with others – the interhuman dimension.

== Teaching career ==
Friedman was a Professor Emeritus of Religious Studies, Philosophy and Comparative Literature at San Diego State University, where he taught from 1973 to 1991, and was the Co-director of the Institute for Dialogical Psychotherapy in San Diego, where he taught in the two-year training program. From 1967 to 1973 he was Professor of Religion at Temple University, Philadelphia, where he was the Director of the Ph.D. Programs in Religion and Literature and in Religion and Psychology. From 1954 to 1966 he was on the Faculty of Philosophy and Literature at the New School for Social Research, New York City. From 1951 to 1964 he was Professor of Philosophy, Religion, and Literature at Sarah Lawrence College. He has also taught at the University of Chicago, Washington Hebrew Union College – Jewish Institute of Religion – Cincinnati, Pendle Hill (the Quaker Study Center at Wallingford, Pa.), Union Theological Seminary (New York City), the Washington (D.C.) School of Psychoanalysis, the William Alanson White Institute of Psychiatry, Psychoanalysis, and Psychology (New York City), Manhattanville College of the Sacred Heart, Vassar College, the California School of Professional Psychology, San Diego, the University of Hawaii, International College, Los Angeles, William Lyon University and American Commonwealth University, San Diego.

== Awards and recognition ==
Maurice Friedman held an S.B. magna cum laude in Economics from Harvard University (1943), an M.A. in English from Ohio State (1947), a Ph.D. in the History of Culture from the University of Chicago (1950), an honorary LL.D. from the University of Vermont (1961), and a Doctor of Humane Letters from the Professional School of Psychological Studies, San Diego (1986). In 1983 he received an M.A. in Psychology from International College. In 1984-85 he was San Diego State University’s first University Research Lecturer. In 1985 Professor Friedman received the Jewish National Book Award for biography for his Martin Buber’s Life and Work. He was Senior Fulbright Lecturer, the Hebrew University of Jerusalem, 1987–88, and in January–February 1992 he gave seminars and lectures at the Indira Gandhi National Centre for the Arts in New Delhi. On August 9, 2015 Maurice Friedman posthumously received a Memorial Award for Lifetime Achievement in recognition of distinguished lifetime contributions to humanistic psychology by the Society for Humanistic Psychology at the 123rd annual convention of the American Psychological Association in Toronto, Ontario. The award was accepted by his daughter, Dvora Friedman Dawson.

== Books ==
- Abraham Joshua Heschel : toward a philosophy of Judaism. Philadelphia : Press of M. Jacobs, 1955.
- Martin Buber: The Life of Dialogue. London, Routledge & Kegan Paul, Chicago: The University of Chicago Press, 1959; New York: Harper Torchbooks, 1960 at Internet Archive. Chicago: University of Chicago Press, Midway Books, 1976. Routledge, 4th ed.revised and expanded w/new preface, 2002, hbk.: ISBN 0415284740. pbk.: ISBN 0415284759.
- The covenant of peace : a personal witness. Wallingford, Pa : Pendle Hill, 1960.
- Problematic Rebel: an Image of Modern Man. New York: Random House, 1963. Republished in a revised edition as Problematic rebel: Melville, Dostoievsky, Kafka, Camus, Chicago : University of Chicago Press, 1970.
- The Worlds of Existentialism: A Critical Reader. New York: Random House, 1964; Chicago: The University of Chicago Press, 1973; Atlantic Highlands, NJ: 1991. The last edition includes a long new Preface updating the book.
- Martin Buber, The Knowledge of Man: A Philosophy of the Interhuman, ed. With an Introductory Essay (Chap. 1) by Maurice Friedman, trans. by Maurice Friedman and Ronald Gregor Smith: New York: Harper & Row, London: George Allen & Unwin, 1965. Harper Torchbooks, 1966. Reprinted in 1988 by Humanities Press International, Atlantic Highlands, NJ.
- To Deny Our Nothingness: Contemporary Images of Man. New York: Delacorte Press, 1967, Delta Books [paperback], 1968. 3rd ed. with new Preface and new Appendices Chicago: The University of Chicago Press, Phoenix Books, 1978, Reprinted as a Midway Book.
- Martin Buber and the Theater, ed. & trans. with three essays by Maurice Friedman. New York: Funk & Wagnalls, 1969.
- Touchstones of Reality: Existential Trust and the Community of Peace. New York: E. P. Dutton, 1972; Dutton paperback, 1973.
- The Hidden Human Image. New York: Delacorte Press, Delta Books, 1974.
- The Human Way: A Dialogue Approach to Religion and Human Experience. Chambersburg, PA: Anima Books, 1982.
- The Confirmation of Otherness: In Family, Community, and Society. New York: Pilgrim Press, 1983.
- Contemporary Psychology: Revealing and Obscuring the Human. Pittsburg: Duquesne University Press, 1984.
- Martin Buber’s Life and Work: The Early Years, 1878-1923. New York: E. P. Dutton, 1981. Paperback Edition – Detroit: Wayne State University Press, 1988.
- Martin Buber’s Life and Work: The Middle Years, 1923-1945. New York: E. P. Dutton, 1983. Paperback Edition – Detroit: Wayne State University Press, 1988.
- Martin Buber’s Life and Work: The Later Years, 1945-1965. New York: E. P. Dutton, 1984. Paperback Edition – Detroit: Wayne State University Press, 1988.
- The Healing Dialogue in Psychotherapy. New York: Jason Aronson, 1985. Paperback Edition – Northvale, NJ: Jason Aronson, 1994. Published in German translation as Der Heilended Dialog in der Psychotherapie, ubersetzt von Brigitte Stein. Koln: Moll & Eckhardt, Edition Humanistische Psychologie im Internationale Institut zur Forderung der Humanistische Psychologie, 1987.
- Martin Buber and the Eternal. New York: Human Sciences Press, 1986.
- Abraham Joshua Heschel & Elie Wiesel: “You Are My Witness”. New York: Farrar, Straus, & Giroux, 1987.
- A Dialogue with Hasidic Tales: Hallowing the Everyday. New York: Human Sciences Press, 1988.
- Encounter on the Narrow Ridge: A Life of Martin Buber. New York: Paragon House, 1991. Paperback Edition – New York, Paragon House, 1993. Published in Spanish translation as Encuentro el Desfiladero: La Vida de Martin Buber, translation Daniel Zadunaisky. Buenos Aires, Argentina: Planeta, Espeja del Mundo, 1993.
- Dialogue and the Human Image: Beyond Humanistic Psychology. Newbury Park, California, London, and New Delhi: Sage Publications, 1992.
- Religion and Psychology: A Dialogical Approach. New York: Paragon House, 1992.
- A Heart of Wisdom: Religion and Human Wholeness. Albany, NY: State University of New York Press, 1992. (hardcover and paperback)
- Intercultural Dialogue and the Human Image: Maurice Friedman at the Indira Gandhi National Centre for the Arts. New Delhi, India: 1995.
- Martin Buber and the Human Sciences. Maurice Friedman – Editor-in-Chief, Pat Boni – Executive Editor, Lawrence Baron, Seymour Cain, Virginia Shabatay, and John Stewart – Associate Editors. Albany, NY: SUNY Press, 1996.
- The Affirming Flame: A Poetics of Meaning (Amherst, New York: Prometheus Books, 1999).
- Genuine Dialogue and Real Partnership: Foundations of True Community. Trafford, 2011.
- Abraham Joshua Heschel: Philosopher of Wonder. Wipf & Stock Publishers, 2012.
- My Friendship with Martin Buber. Syracuse, New York: Syracuse University Press, 2013.
