= Lolland Hydrogen Community =

Coordinates: 54°50′N 11°09′E

Denmark's first full-scale wind-Hydrogen energy plant and testing facility, the Lolland Hydrogen Community, began operation in May 2007. It is also the European Union's first full-scale Hydrogen Community Demonstration facility for residential Fuel Cell Combined Heat and Power (CHP).

Phase 3 of the project that ran until 2012 and was the installing of fuel cell micro combined heat and power plants.

Located in the city of Nakskov on the island of Lolland, where wind power is abundant, the hydrogen energy plant was received with funding from the Danish Energy Authority, which is a joint partnership between the Municipality of Lolland, IRD Fuel Cells, and Baltic Sea Solutions.

The island of Lolland is producing 50% more energy from renewable energy sources than it consumes, and the hydrogen project was seeking to locally store excess wind power in the form of hydrogen, for use in residential and industrial facilities.

Hydrogen is produced by using excess wind power to electrolyze water to produce hydrogen and oxygen. The oxygen is used in the municipal water treatment plant nearby to speed up the biological process. The hydrogen is stored in low-pressure storage tanks at six bars and fuels two PEM Fuel Cell Micro Combined Heat and Power (CHP) stations of 2 kilowatts (kW) and 6.5 kW, respectively.

== See also ==
- Hydrogen economy
- Renewable energy in Iceland
- Wind-hydrogen hybrid power system
- Wind power in Denmark
