= Renewable energy in Denmark =

Renewable energy (RE)
- RE as % of gross energy consumption: 32.9% (Note: Number found using Calculator.net.) (2018)

Renewable electricity
- Domestic electricity supply generated by RE: 71.9% (2021)
- RE generated / Net electricity generation: 21,043 / 29,453 GWh (2017)
- Record % RE covered electricity consumption: 138.7% (26/7/15 wind only)

Installed capacity
- Wind turbines: 6.1 GW
- Bio energy (2014): 1 GW (excluding waste; 2014)
- Solar power: 1 GW (2018)
- Hydro power: <0.01 GW (2018)

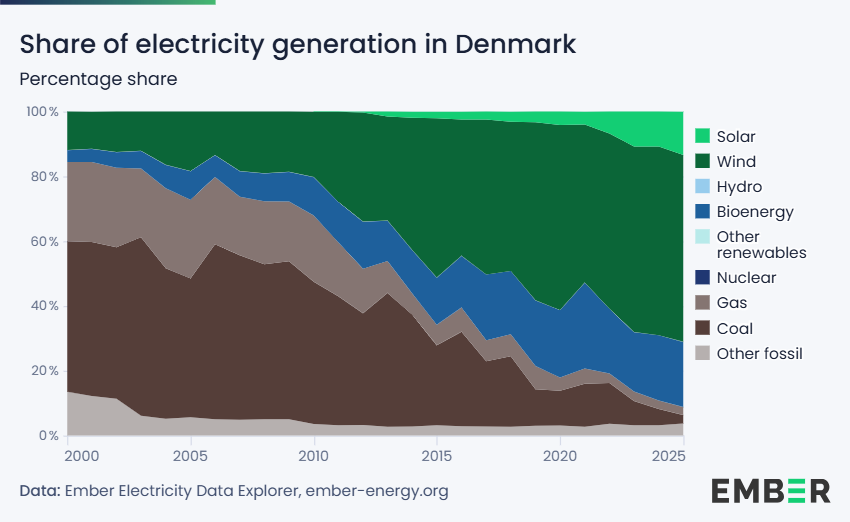
Share of electricity generation in Denmark - percentage share

Denmark is a leading country in renewable energy production and usage. Renewable energy sources collectively produced 81% of Denmark's electricity generation in 2022, and are expected to provide 100% of national electric power production from 2030. Including energy use in the heating/cooling and transport sectors, Denmark is expected to reach 100% renewable energy in 2050, up from the 34% recorded in 2021.

In the heating sector the country has long used and continues to develop district heating (DH) networks. Hot water or steam is produced centrally and then distributed through a network of insulated pipes to high population areas. Houses within a district heating area have heat exchangers installed instead of boilers for their heating and hot water requirements. The heat exchanger keeps the two water systems separate and means that heat can be adjusted as with a familiar domestic boiler. One simple but important innovation in the district heating network was the development of internally insulated pipes. The two pipes taking and receiving the return of water are placed inside a much larger pipe and insulating material is set so as to fill the figure eight shaped void between the two smaller and the large pipe. In 2013 district heating supplied over 60% of all households in Denmark with heating and hot water. The development of district heating technology has led Denmark to become a world leader in industrial pump and thermostat designs and its products are used in many industries worldwide.

Cogeneration is also widely used. This is a process that extracts the waste heat produced when generating electricity. Power stations designed to do this are known as Combined Heat and Power (CHP) stations. CHP stations in Denmark are often sized to provide the heat required for the local district heating system. Thus CHP stations produce both electricity for the grid and heat for district heating systems. Heat can be stored in large industrial hot water tanks for several days allowing electricity and heat supply to be provided time independently from each other. By 2013 the use of CHP stations had reduced the overall energy consumption in Denmark by 11%.

Danish electricity generation has become increasingly decentralised with a move away from production in the large central power stations to many smaller locally based and mostly CHP stations. Many of these smaller stations use locally sourced bio energy sources including straw and wood pellets.

== Energy consumption and objectives ==
Gross energy consumption in Denmark (PJ), 1980–2018
Unit: petajoules (PJ)	1980	1990	2000	2005	2010	2012	2013	2014	2015	2016	2017	2018	2019	_{2020}	_{2021*}	_{2022*}
Total	814	819	839	850	814	782	763	755	760	770	772	781	749	706	729	709
Oil	546	355	376	352	312	289	278	276	284	280	286	288	281	238	245	256
Natural gas	0	82	192	192	176	149	138	127	133	131	125	121	113	96	91	65
Coal (Note: Including coke for 1980 and 2015–2018.)	241	327	175	166	147	146	143	137	108	116	92	98	70	69	63	53
Waste, non-renewable	5	8	14	17	16	17	17	18	18	18	18	18	19	20	19	18
Renewable energy	22	48	81	123	163	180	186	196	219	225	252	257	266	283	311	317

*Provisional data for 2021, 2022, some data for earlier years may also be provisional.

Renewable-energy consumption increased more than elevenfold from 22 petajoules (6.1 TWh) in 1980 to 257 PJ (71 TWh) in 2018. Whilst renewable-energy consumption was rising between 1990 and 2013, gross energy consumption fell by 7%. Most of the fall can be attributed to a great increase in combined power and heat generation (CHP) and the growth in wind power. This has increased energy conversion efficiency, reducing conversion losses by 28% or 7% relative to gross energy consumption. Put simply smaller and decentralised CHP plants use fuels far more efficiently than older centralised power plants, and wind power has no fossil fuel to waste. Thus the growth of these two sources (10% during the period) has displaced fossil fuels by more than a one-to-one ratio. The use of Biofuels in local CHP plants has further displaced fossil fuel consumption. The figures in the table above show that whilst the reduction in fossil fuel use has been most pronounced in coal use, there has also been a significant reduction in oil and natural gas usage since 2000. Oil has fared better than the other fuels because it still dominates usage in the transport sector and alternative fuels and transport solutions are not yet widely deployed. On 22 March 2012, the then–government of Denmark announced the Energy Agreement, which had the following goals:

- Eliminating coal from power production by 2030;
- having completely fossil-fuel-free electricity and heating production by 2035;
- Providing 100% of Denmark's energy requirements from renewable sources by 2050.

In 2018, an energy agreement was signed by the then–government of Denmark with support from all the parties in the Danish parliament at the time. This agreement had the goal of providing 50% of Denmark's energy from renewable energy in 2030, fully covering the Danish people's electricity consumption.

In 2020, the (as of May 2020) current government of Denmark revealed a plan to build two energy islands, one on Bornholm and one on "an artificial island in the North Sea". When built both would have a capacity of at least 2 gigawatts; the North Sea island could eventually have a capacity of 10 gigawatt.

== Energy consumption by sector ==
Projected total gross final energy consumption by sector in 2020.
1. Heating and cooling (46.6%)
2. Electricity (19.8%)
3. Transport (33.6%)

All EU countries as well as Iceland and Norway submitted National Renewable Energy Action Plans (NREAPs) to outline the steps taken, and projected progress by each country between 2010 and 2020 to meet the Renewable Energy Directive. Each plan contains a detailed breakdown of each country's current renewable energy usage and plans for future developments. According to projections by the Danish submission in 2020 the gross final energy consumption in Denmark by sector breaks down as follows:

Projected energy use by sector in 2020	Mtoe	TWh	RE 2020 target
Heating and cooling	7.7	90	39.8%
Electricity	3.2	37	51.9%
Transport	5.5	64	10.1%
Gross final energy consumption*	16.4	191	30.0%

Almost half of energy consumption (46.6%) is used in the heating and cooling sector. The heating and cooling sector (also known as the thermal sector) includes domestic heating and air conditioning, industrial processes such as furnaces and any use of heat generally. The next largest share is the transport sector at 33.6%, followed by the electricity sector at 19.8%. Total annual energy consumption is projected to be 16.4 megatonnes of oil equivalent (191 TWh) by 2020. Denmark's binding 2020 target under the EU Renewable Energy Directive was a 30% share of renewable energy in gross final energy consumption, up from 17% in 2005. The share of renewable energy in Denmark more than doubled between 2005 and 2020 on the back of continued investment in wind power and bioenergy, reaching 31.7% in 2020 and thereby meeting the target, although large statistical transfers to Belgium, Ireland and the Netherlands in 2020 and 2021 temporarily reduced the renewable energy share recorded within Denmark. Renewable energy use is expected to be 39.8% in the heating and cooling sector, 51.9% in the electricity sector and 10.1% in the transport sector.

The energy measures above are gross final energy consumption. Another broader measure, primary energy consumption also includes energy used in the extraction of fuels (the energy sector) and energy lost in transformation (the transformation sector, i.e. converting heat to electricity in power plants or fuel energy to heat in heating plants) as well as gross final energy consumption for end users. In 2013 Denmark's total final energy consumption was 607 petajoules (169 TWh) whilst its primary energy consumption was 763 petajoules (212 TWh). Most of the approximately 25% difference is accounted for in losses in the transformation sector. These losses are likely to be most prevalent in thermal electricity sectors, thus the use of renewable electricity will reduce CO_{2} emissions and fuels lost in the energy and transformation sectors as well as those in final consumption. Denmark is one of the world's most fuel efficient countries and the difference between the two measures is smaller than many other countries.

== Electricity sector ==
=== Production by source ===
Percentage of electricity generation in Denmark by source in 2017
1. Wind (50.2%)
2. Wood (12.2%)
3. Solar (2.70%)
4. Waste (2.50%)
5. Straw (1.90%)
6. Biogas (1.90%)
7. Hydro (0.10%)
8. Non Renewable (28.6%)

In 2017 wind was the major source of Denmark's net electricity generation, with 50.2 percent of the total yearly production. Biofuels (wood, straw and biogas) and the biodegradable part of waste provided the second-largest RE source at 18.5% of national generation. Solar power has grown significantly in recent years from a low base and provides a further 2.7% share. Hydroelectricity provided just 0.1% of net national generation, but the country maintains strong links to its neighboring countries large hydroelectric reserves. In 2017 fossil fuels and other non renewable sources accounted for just 28.6% of Denmark's total net generation and continues to decline against a total of 71.4% generated from renewable sources.

=== Growth from renewables ===
Electricity generation in Denmark (GWh) from renewable energy sources, 2007–2017
	Total electricity generation*	Land based wind turbines	Offshore wind turbines	Photovoltaics	Hydropower**	Biofuels	Waste	Thermal generation from RE fuels***	Total renewable generation	% of National generation
2007	37,024	5,800	1,370		30	1,936	1,570	3,192	10,392	28.1%
2008	34,649	5,453	1,524		27	1,920	1,672	3,257	10,261	29.6%
2009	34,290	5,046	1,664		20	2,117	1,551	3,029	9,759	28.5%
2010	36,618	5,122	2,686		21	3,313	1,467	4,176	12,005	32.8%
2011	33,210	6,360	3,405		18	3,025	1,502	3,851	13,634	41.1%
2012	29,025	6,796	3,472	104	18	3,143	1,440	3,935	14,325	49.4%
2013	32,956	6,772	4,351	518	15	3,220	1,411	3,996	15,652	47.5%
2014	30,615	7,913	5,165	597	16	3,078	1,441	3,871	17,562	57.4%
2015	27,704	9,300	4,833	605	19	2,998	1,438	3,789	18,545	66.9%
2016	28,930	8,132	4,650	744	19	3,508	1,377	4,266	17,811	61.6%
2017	29,453	9,597	5,180	789	18	4,711	1,360	5,455	21,043	71.4%

* excludes internal consumption by plant. ** figures in italics include photovoltaics. *** includes biofuels and biodegrable fraction of waste.

RE terminology
In other countries

See: Renewable energy by country

Installed capacity:

The maximum power that can be generated under ideal

conditions when a plant is supplied with wind, sun or fuel.

1 kW = App. power of a 1 bar electric fire.

1 MW = 1000 kW

1 GW = 1000 MW

1 TW = 1000 GW

W_{e} is watt of electricity, W_{th} is watt of thermal (heat).

Electricity used / produced:

10 kWh = 1 kW x 10 hours

or 2 kW x 5 hours

100 GWh = 100GW x 1 hour

or 25GW x 4 hours

How many households does 1MW of

wind / solar provide electricity for?

1 Onshore wind turbine rated 2.2 MW

1,202 households (EU)*

App. 546 households per 1 MW, (546,000 per GW)

1 Offshore wind turbine rated 3.6 MW

3,312 households (EU) *

App. 920 households per 1MW, (920,000 per GW)

5MW Solar PV power

1515 households (UK)**

App. 303 households per 1MW, (303,000 per GW)

Sources: *Emea.org **Solar Trade Organisation

Percentage of Danish electricity supply provided by renewable sources 1990-2021.
Share of total domestic electricity supply, 1990-2021.

The table above shows the proportion of total Danish electricity generated by renewables rose between 2007 and 2017 from 28.1% to 71.4%. Total renewable electricity generation grew from 10.4 TWh in 2007 to 21.0 TWh by 2017. Between 2007 and 2014 most of the growth in RE electricity generation was the result of growing wind power generation (accounting for +56.9% of total generation growth), thermal generation from RE fuels added an additional 6.5%, Solar power has also made an impact as a new power source of an additional 597 GWh (5.7%) since 2012.

=== Fossil fuel reduction ===
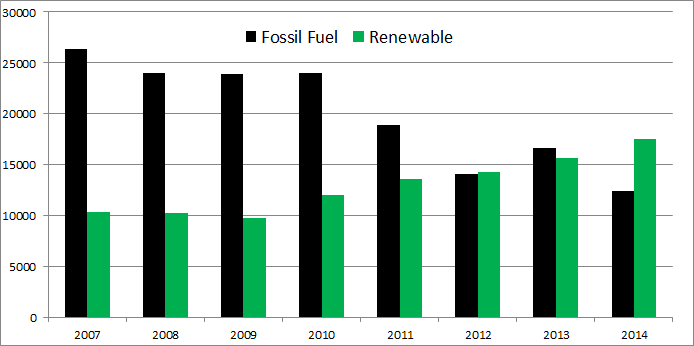
Net electricity generation from renewable and fossil fuel sources in Denmark

Renewable energy generation in Denmark increased from 10.4 TWh to 17.6 TWh between 2007 and 2014. Fossil fuel generation fell from 26.3 TWh in 2007 to 12.4 TWh in 2014. Electricity generated from renewables first exceeded electricity from fossil fuels in 2012 and again in 2014.

Coal power, for example, has fallen from 90% of Danish electricity generation in 1990 to 42% in 2005 and 10% in 2020. Current (2023) plans anticipate a complete phase out of coal from the electricity and heat sectors by 2030.

=== Forecasts ===
The International Energy Agency's (IEA) Renewables 2022 forecast indicates that Denmark's renewable electricity capacity could nearly double, reaching 7 gigawatts (GW) by 2027, mainly driven by utility-scale solar photovoltaic (PV) projects financed via merchant revenues and bilateral contracts, alongside onshore wind expansion through repowering facilitated by auctions or corporate Power Purchase Agreements (PPAs). The report highlights the possibility of a 25% increase to nearly 10 GW with additional investment in subsidy-free PV projects and active market participation. Streamlining the permitting process and accelerating project commissioning are expected to contribute an extra 2 GW from solar and wind sources.

== Heating and cooling sector ==
Renewable energy use in the heating sector, 2014
Source	Tj/year	Estimated share of total sector (all sources)
Biomass	99,082	35.33%
— solid biomass	96,075	-34.26%
— biogas	2,320	-2.15%
— bio liquids	686	-0.24%
RE from heat pumps	7,294	2.60%
Solar	1,224	0.44%
Geothermal	83	0.03%
Total	107,683	38.40%

Renewable Share of heating and cooling sector
	2009	2010	2011	2012	2013	2014	2015	2016	2017	2018	2019	2020
Share of sector	29.4%	30.4%	31.9%	33.2%	34.7%	38.0%	39.5%	41.1%	44.1%	45.0%	47.3%	51.1%

According to the energy Progress Reports submitted by EU member states (as well as Norway and Iceland) to the European Commission, by 2014 renewable energy provided 38.4% of the energy consumed in the heating sector. RE in the heating sector is overwhelmingly provided by biomass, including straw, wood, bio-oil and biodegradable waste producing about 35% of the sector's total consumption. The next largest share was provided by heat pumps at around 2.6% of the total. Solar thermal produced just under a half percentage share whilst geothermal heat produced a trace contribution. Renewable energy in the heating sector consists of sources consumed independently as well as their contribution to district heating networks. In 2008 about 40% of households gross final energy consumption for domestic heating came from district heating and 65% of consumption for the heating of commercial and public sector buildings. By 2013 the figure for households using district heating had grown to 60%.

In 2014 combined heat and power plants produced 68.7% of the heat for district heating networks in Denmark (as well as 61% of electricity power produced by thermal plants). In the same year biomass, waste and biogas provided the fuel for 18.3%, 20.8% and 0.9% of heat produced in CHP plants, in heat only plants the figures were 13.1%, 2% and 0.3% respectively whilst bio oil provided 0.6% of heat. Solar thermal, heat pumps and electric boilers also provided heat only plants with 0.6% and 0.4% of their production.

The 2009 NREAP report identified new and ongoing ways to promote the use of renewable energy in the heating and cooling sector and amongst these included the following. Tax exemption for RE heating and cooling producers. Building regulations and information initiatives were identified to increase energy efficiency across targeted at both the building sector and consumers both public and private. Regulations governing the energy efficient cooling of buildings under local authority control has been in place since 2008. A scrappage scheme for those using oil fired boilers to run central heating was planned for March 2010 to reduce CO_{2} output and increase the take up of district heating and RE installations. Building regulations were in force to promote energy savings.

== Transport sector ==
Renewable energy use in the Transport sector, 2014
Source	Tj/year	Estimated share of total sector (all sources).
Biodiesel	7,063	4.17%
Bioethanol	1,872	1.10%
Renewable electricity	673	0.40%
Hydrogen	0	0.00%
Total	9,608	5.67%

Renewable energy share of transport sector
	2009	2010	2011	2012	2013	2014	2015	2016	2017	2018	2019	2020
Share of sector	0.7%	1.1%	3.6%	6.3%	6.5%	6.6%	6.4%	6.7%	6.9%	6.9%	7.1%	9.6%

In 2014 renewable energy provided 5.67% of total final energy consumption in the transport sector. The largest source was from biodiesel followed some by bioethanol. Renewable electricity also made a contribution to the sector but this was smaller in 2014 than those from biofuels. In 2008 the government's “Green Transport” proposal announced that the upward trend in CO_{2} emissions from transport must be halted. The political agreement “A Green Transport Policy” proposed measures to reduce emissions including the strengthening of public transport and encouraging greater utilisation and efficiency of existing vehicles. Preparations were made for a greener approach to vehicle taxation, including tax exemption for electric vehicles up to 2015. The Ministry for Transport also established the “Centre for Green Transport” to carry out research into energy efficient transport solutions. The EDTTP act was also cited as having established the Energy Technology Development and Demonstration Programme to research into solutions including biofuels and intelligent electricity.

According to the 2009 NREAP report biofuels were expected to provide the main source of RE in the transport sector rising from 1.3 petajoules (0.36 TWh) in 2010 to 10.9 petajoules (3.0 TWh) in 2020. Renewable electricity was expected to make up the minor share rising from 0.5 to 1.2 PJ (0.14 to 0.33 TWh) over the period for use in electric vehicles and trains.

Total electric vehicle sales in Denmark in 2015 were 4,762 units representing 2.29% of total car sales, with the TESLA model S having a surge of sales at 2,736 units in a rush to beat tax exemptions.

The Agreement on Green Road Transport, enacted on 4 December 2020, reflects Denmark's strategy to increase eco-friendly vehicle adoption, with a goal of 775,000 zero and low-emission vehicles by 2030. This policy is expected to reduce carbon emissions by 1 million tonnes by 2025 and 2.1 million tonnes by 2030, aiming to shift a third of the nation's vehicle fleet to greener options. In 2021, Denmark supported enhancements in transport infrastructure, specifically expanding electric vehicle (EV) charging and renewable fuel stations. The 2022 green tax reform is designed to align non-road transport energy taxes with CO_{2} emissions, effective from 2025. Furthermore, the Coalition Agreement of 2022 reaffirms Denmark's commitment to green transport, focusing on revised electric vehicle rollout plans, promoting zero-emission vehicle adoption, establishing a fossil-free domestic flight route by 2025, aiming for complete domestic aviation decarbonization by 2030 with the support of a passenger tax, and accelerating the green transition in the heavy-duty transport, maritime transport, and aviation sectors.

== Sources ==
=== Wind ===
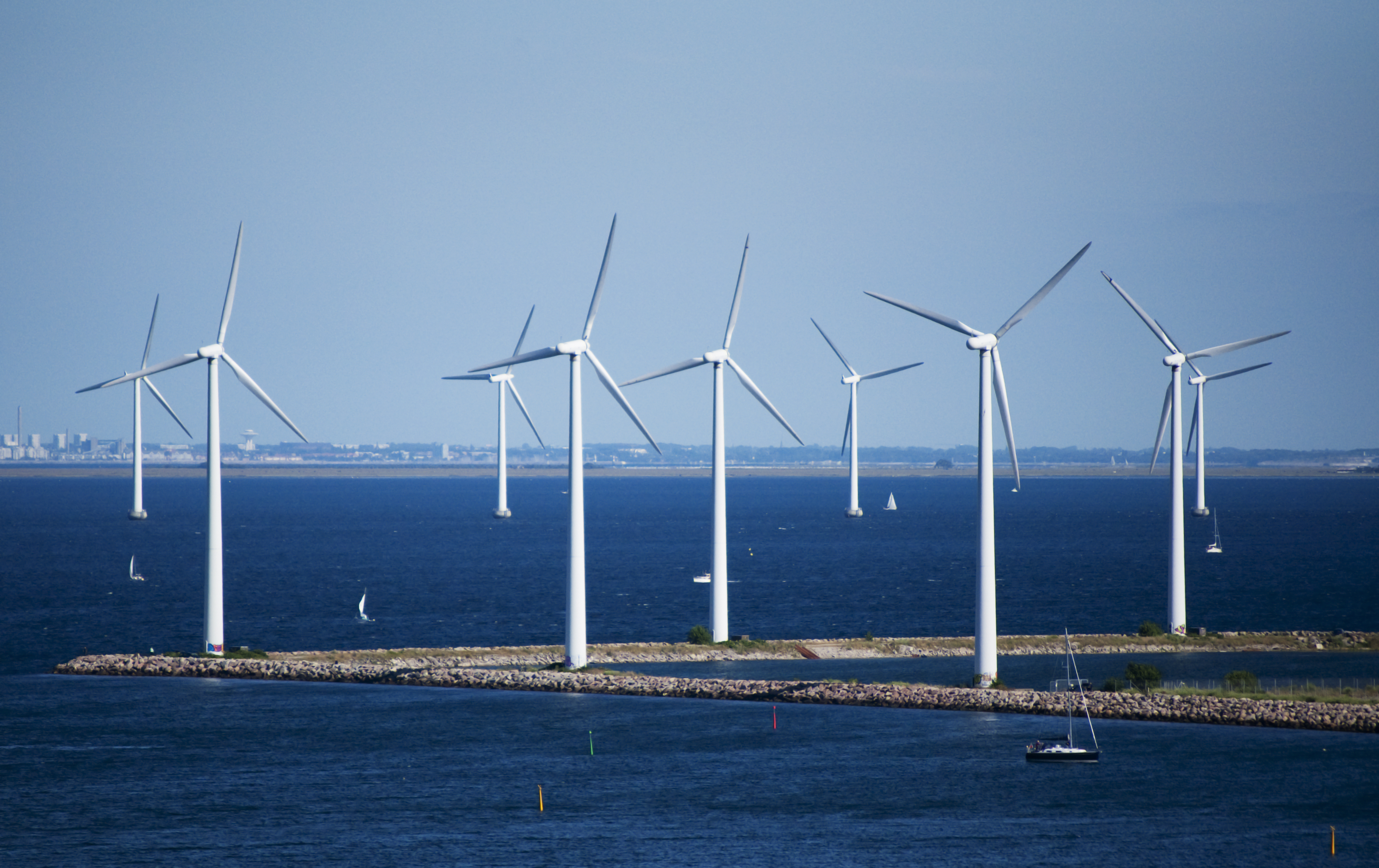

Wind power net electricity generation 2007-2017 (GWh)
	Land based wind turbines	Offshore wind turbines	Total wind power
2007	5,800	1,370	7,170
2008	5,453	1,524	6,977
2009	5,046	1,664	6,710
2010	5,122	2,686	7,808
2011	6,360	3,405	9,765
2012	6,796	3,472	10,268
2013	6,772	4,351	11,123
2014	7,913	5,165	13,078
2015	9,300	4,833	14,133
2016	8,132	4,650	12,782
2017	9,597	5,180	14,777

Wind power net electricity generation (GWh) 2007-2017
Wind power net electricity generation 2007-2017

Electricity generated by wind power in Denmark rose from 7.2 TWh in 2007 to 13.1 GwH in 2014. Offshore wind power has been growing in importance, rising from 19.1% of total wind production in 2007 to 34.5% of production by 2014. Denmark was the world's leading windpower country in 2014 by percentage of demand coverage at 39% of Danish electricity consumption.

Ambitious plans for future development include increasing production from the 13.1 TWh produced in 2014 to 23.3 TWh by 2024, which would raise demand coverage from 39% to 61% over the period. Offshore and nearshore windpower is expected to grow quicker than land based wind power to reach almost parity with land based production by 2024 (49%).

Denmark often produces more electricity from windpower than the entire country requires and will export it for sale or for storage in hydroelectric dams in Norway and Sweden. Occasionally electricity prices turn negative for producers when there is a glut of electricity production and lack of demand abroad as well. One result of this has been the growth of electric boilers being installed in district heating plants. When there is an excess of electricity the plants can use cheap electricity to heat the hot water instead of finite bio or fossil fuels. As wind production rises the problem of too much electricity being generated will also give rise to new challenges and solutions. Electric heating and cooling can also be used in the form of more efficient heat pumps to mop up excess electricity supply. The electricity sector will in effect expand into the heating and cooling sector to displace current energy sources.

By 2022, Denmark had achieved an installed offshore wind energy capacity of 2.3 GW and plans to raise this to a minimum of 9 GW, with a possibility of reaching up to 14 GW by 2030. A 2023 IEA report identifies Denmark as the global leader in installing offshore wind parks and energy islands.

=== Renewable thermal ===
Renewable thermal net electricity generation (GWh) 2007-2014.
Renewable thermal net electricity generation 2007-2014.

RE thermal generation includes electricity generated from biofuels and electricity generated from the fraction of waste that is biodegradable. Since 2010 RE thermal generation in Denmark has accounted for approximately 4 TWh per year.

Biofuels also play an increasingly important part in district heating. The proportion of heat generated by biofuels has been rising since the 1980s and by 2013 close to 45% of district heat was produced by renewables. A rough calculation of the 60% of households provided with district heat would imply that renewable fuels provide just over a quarter of Denmark's heating and hot water needs in that year.

Renewable thermal generation by source 2009-2014 (GWh)
	2009	2010	2011	2012	2013	2014
RE generation from waste	912	863	825	792	776	792
Biogas	340	355	350	373	408	447
Biomass	1,777	2,958	2,680	2,771	2,812	2,631
Total renewable thermal	3,029	4,176	3,855	3,936	3,996	3,870

RE generation from waste

RE generation from waste reduced a little over the period to 792 GWh in 2014, the reduction being due to less availability of waste and the reduced proportion of waste being classified as renewable energy in 2011. Overall about 2.6% of national electricity was generated by RE generation from waste. Denmark incinerates close to 3 million tonnes of waste each year to produce electricity and heat, most of it is produced domestically with a smaller share imported from abroad. There are 28 waste incineration plants in the country. The waste powered CHP plants may also co burn additional fossil fuels, including oil and natural gas, but increasingly biomass is used to improve the performance of waste energy production. Only the carbon neutral biodegradable part of waste is classified as renewable energy generation which was defined as 55 percent of total waste from 2011 (in 2009 it was 58.8 percent). Total waste provided 20 percent of district heating generation and between 4 and 5 percent of electricity generation in the country. Energy production from waste over the next ten years is expected to remain at similar levels, new pre treatments of waste may however be developed.

Biogas

Biogas generation has been rising steadily from a low base and reached 447 GWh of electricity production in 2014 contributing about 1.5% of Denmark's electricity. Approximately 75% of biogas generating plants are 3 MW or smaller in size which numbered approximately 120 plants in 2015. A further 15 larger CHP plants account for the remaining approximately 25% of biogas consumption and co-fire biogas, mostly with natural gas. The largest source of Biogas is from manure, other sources include water treatment plants and landfill sites. Many of the smaller plants are located on farms and or other sources of biogas. Smaller biogas plants tend not to contribute heat to district heating networks. Denmark intends to increase production and use of biogas from 4 petajoules (1.1 TWh) consumption in 2015 to 17 petajoules (4.7 TWh) by 2020 with the goal of using 50% of manure in the country. Most of the new biogas is likely to be injected directly into the gas system and used for industry and transport. From 2019 to 2021, biogas contribution of gas consumption increased from 10% to 20%. In December 2024 the European Union announced a state aid scheme of €1.7 billion (DKK 13 billion) to support expanded production of upgraded biogas and e-methane, which is expected to reduce GHG emissions by approximately 450,000 tonnes of CO_{2} annually from 2033.

Biomass

Biomass provides the largest share of renewable energy in Denmark when considering the electricity sector, heating and cooling sector and transport sector combined. The fuel contributed to approximately 8.6% of total electricity generation in Denmark generating 2.6 TWh of electricity in 2014. Total consumption of biomass amounted to 107 petajoules (30 TWh) in 2013. There were 39 CHP plants using biomass as a fuel in 2014 consuming approximately 2.7 million tonnes to produce heat and power, corresponding to 40.9 petajoules (11.4 TWh) consumption in that year. Biomass is sometimes co-fired with other fuels including a small percentage that is co-fired with waste. Around 40% of the biomass used in Denmark is imported including the majority of wood pellets.

Solar power net electricity generation (GwH) 2012-2014.
Solar power net electricity generation (GwH) 2012-2014.

Biomass by Source, 2013
Biomass Source	Percentage share
Wood pellets	33%
Firewood	21%
Straw	20%
Wood chips	17%
Wood waste	9%

Electricity generated from biomass increased dramatically in 2010 following in increased share in its use in a number of power plants. Between 2009 and 2014 production of power increased by around 50%. By 2024 biomass is expected to double the percentage of renewable energy share from 15% to 30% of renewable electricity production in Denmark. Total consumption of Biomass is expected to rise to 115 petajoules (32 TWh) by 2024. A number of power stations are being converted from using coal to using wood pellets as a fuel. Some smaller CHP plants are converting from using natural gas to biomass.

=== Solar ===
Solar power is 2,339 MW grid connected by mid-2022, a relatively recent arrival in Denmark. Significant generation first occurred in 2012 with 104 GWh of electricity generation. By 2014 this had risen to 597 GWh. The large increase in solar deployment in 2012 was aided by incentives including tax credits and net settlement for produced power. In response to a dramatic rise in solar installations during that year the incentives were revised downwards for 2013 and a smaller rise occurred during that year. Smaller solar installations predominate with 73% of PV cell capacity being less than 6 kW by the end of 2014, a sign that incentives have largely benefitted households. Installed capacity of Solar PV was predicted to rise to 1,140 MW by 2024 and provide an estimated 3% of electricity consumption in Denmark, but the rapid decrease in cost resulted in passing that number several years earlier. By 2022, several large solar parks were being built without subsidy.

== Targets and progress ==
=== Targets ===
Renewable energy targets and projected consumption (PJ) 2005–2020, NREAP.
	2005	2010	2011	2012	2013	2014	2015	2016	2017	2018	2019	2020
Heating and cooling renewable sources.	78	104	107	108	118	118	120	121	121	122	126	127
Heating and cooling total sector.	338	337	336	336	335	335	332	329	326	324	322	320
Heating and cooling (%) renewable.	23.2%	30.8%	31.8%	32.1%	35.2%	35.3%	36.0%	36.7%	37.2%	37.7%	39.3%	39.8%
Electricity renewable sources.	36	45	49	50	62	61	62	64	66	67	70	71
Electricity total sector.	133	130	131	132	133	135	135	136	135	135	136	136
Electricity (%) renewable.	26.8%	34.3%	37.1%	38.0%	46.2%	45.5%	45.7%	47.2%	48.6%	49.7%	51.8%	51.9%
Total transport (excl. electricity) renewable sources.	0	2	6	5	11	11	11	11	11	12	12	12
Total transport (excl. electricity) all sources.	219	217	221	226	226	227	227	229	229	230	231	231
Transport consumption adjusted.*	174	175	179	183	182	182	182	182	182	182	182	181
Transport (%) renewable.	0.2%	1.0%	3.5%	5.9%	6.0%	6.0%	6.7%	7.3%	7.9%	8.6%	9.4%	10.1%
Expected total renewable energy consumption.	114	150	161	168	190	189	192	195	198	200	207	209
Overall renewable energy share (all sectors).	16.5%	21.9%	19.2%	19.2%	20.5%	20.5%	22.6%	22.6%	25.3%	25.3%	30.1%	30.0%

*Transport consumption as defined in Article 3 (4) (a) of Directive 2009/28/EC, renewable electricity in motor transport counts 2.5 x value.

The table above shows the expected trajectory for shares of renewable energy in the three sectors as well as the overall target trajectory. Overall between 2005 and 2020 renewable energy sources are expected to rise from 16.5% to 30% of total energy use.

=== Progress ===
Renewable energy results and consumption (PJ) 2005–2020, Progress Report.
	2013	2014	2015	2016	2017	2018
Heating and cooling renewable sources.	109	108	122	132	149	155
Heating and cooling (%) renewable.	35.5%	38.4%	40.1%	41.7%	46.7%	48.6%
Electricity renewable sources.	55.6	61.1	63.8	68.0	76.5	79.8
Electricity (%) renewable.	43.1%	48.5%	51.3%	53.7%	60.3%	62.8%
Total transport (excl. electricity) renewable sources.	9.3	9.6	10.3	10.6	9.9	9.9
Transport (%) renewable.	5.6%	5.7%	6.7%	6.8%	6.6%	6.6%
Gross total renewable energy consumption.	174	178	196	210	235	245
Overall renewable energy share (all sectors).	26.7%	28.4%	31.0%	32.2%	35.4%	36.7%

The above table shows the actual overall and by sector renewable energy consumption achieved (PJ) in the years 2013-2016 as outlined in Denmark's NREAP progress report. Overall Denmark is running well ahead of its predicted trajectory, having achieved its 2020 total goal in 2015. For 2016, while heating and cooling and electricity sectors met the expected trajectory targets, the transport sector fell short of its target.

== See also ==
- Wind power in Denmark
- Electricity sector in Denmark
- Solar power in Denmark
- Biofuel in Denmark
- Geothermal power in Denmark
- Energy in Denmark
- Energy policy of the European Union
- Renewable energy in Norway
- Renewable energy in Sweden
- Renewable energy in Finland
- Renewable energy in Iceland
- Renewable energy in the European Union
- Renewable energy by country
- Renewable energy commercialisation
- List of countries by renewable electricity production
