= Robert L. Bradley Jr. =

American economist and energy analyst

Robert L. Bradley Jr. (born June 17, 1955) is CEO and founder of the Institute for Energy Research, a think tank that supports fossil fuels. and that has been described as a front group for the fossil fuel industry. Bradley is a senior fellow at the American Institute for Economic Research (AIER), as well as Energy and Climate Change fellow of the Institute of Economic Affairs in London.

== Biography ==
Bradley grew up in Houston, Texas. He graduated from the Kinkaid School in 1973. He received a B.A. in economics from Rollins College. He attended Rollins on a full athletic scholarship and was captain and MVP of the men's tennis team in 1977. He went on to receive a master's degree in economics from the University of Houston in 1980 (thesis: "Interpretations of the Wicksellian Idea") and in 1985 a Ph.D. in political economy from International College, Los Angeles, where the chairman of his dissertation committee was Murray Rothbard. He spent the summer of 1977 in residence at the Institute for Humane Studies in Menlo Park, California, studying with Austrian-school economists, including Rothbard and Nobel Laureate F. A. Hayek.

== Career ==
Bradley spent nearly 20 years in the business world, including 16 years at Enron, where for the last seven years he was corporate director for public policy analysis and speechwriter for Kenneth L. Lay. His opposition to the company's so-called "green" energy policy is recounted on his web site PoliticalCapitalism.org.

He has been a senior research fellow at the University of Houston and at the Center for Energy Economics at the University of Texas at Austin. He received the Julian L. Simon Memorial Award in 2002 for his work on free market approaches to energy sustainability.

He is the author of eight books on energy history and policy, including The Mirage of Oil Protection (1989); Oil, Gas, and Government: The U.S. Experience (2 vols.: 1996). Julian Simon and the Triumph of Energy Sustainability (2000); Climate Alarmism Reconsidered (2003); and (with Richard Fulmer) Energy: The Master Resource (2004), which Milton Friedman described as a "splendid" book that "effectively debunks the widespread predictions of energy doom."

Bradley has edited two autobiographies: Done In Oil by J. Howard Marshall II (Texas A&M University Press, 1994) and Everyone Wins! A Life in Free Enterprise by Gordon Cain (Chemical Heritage Foundation, 1997).

Bradley wrote Political Capitalism: A Tetralogy, a business history and business best-practices book which documents the rise and fall of Enron. His first book, Capitalism at Work: Business, Government, and Energy (2009), was followed by Edison to Enron: Energy Markets and Political Strategies (2011) and Enron Ascending: The Forgotten Years, 1984–1996 (2018). The final volume, Contra-Capitalism: Enron and Beyond, is planned for publication in 2026, the twenty-fifth anniversary of the company's fall.

In late 2008, Bradley founded the free-market and pro-fossil fuel energy blog MasterResource. It has supported greater fossil fuel use and pushed climate denial talking points. In January 2014, it was ranked a top twenty-five 'green blog' by Technorati.
