= International College, Los Angeles =

Private college in Los Angeles, California, United States

International College

Location
- Los Angeles, California; United States
- 34°3′40″N 118°26′52″W

Information
- Motto: In Vestigiis Institutorum Antiquorum ("In the wake of ancient institutes")
- Established: 1970
- Founder: Linden G. Leavitt
- Closed: 1986

International College was a small, private, non-traditional and unaccredited college founded in Los Angeles in the early 1970s by Linden G. Leavitt. It was licensed to issue degrees by the California State Department of Education and its degrees were accepted by several dozen other schools, reportedly including Harvard and Johns Hopkins, but its attempts to attain accreditation never came to fruition. The college was reported to have 174 students in 1978 and 350 students in 1980. It had no classrooms, libraries or laboratories, but its administrative offices were located at 1019 Gayley Avenue in Los Angeles. It ceased operations in 1986 and its students were transferred to another unaccredited college, William Lyon University.

As its motto, In Vestigiis Institutorum Antiquorum indicated, the college followed the methods of the first universities, where students were paired with outstanding tutors. Students could earn credit studying at different universities before completing their dissertation. Many of the works of its students were published by the College under the imprint Guild of Tutors Press.

In the area of economics, the late Dr. Hans F. Sennholz was one of the tutors who participated over many years, graduating students of renown in the field of economic education and public policy. One example is Alejandro Chafuen, president and CEO of Atlas Economic Research Foundation since 1991 and president and founder of the Hispanic American Center of Economic Research. Another is Juan Carlos Cachanosky, a renowned professor in Argentina and Guatemala.

Also in the field of economics, Robert L. Bradley, Jr., founder of the Institute for Energy Research received his degree from leading libertarian theorist Murray N. Rothbard.

The college had a worldwide faculty of tutors in other areas as well, such as: Leonard Bernstein in music; Anaïs Nin in writing; Buckminster Fuller in Design Science; Yehudi Menuhin in Music; Kenneth Rexroth in Poetry; Sulvain Auroux in the Philosophy of Science; Linguistics, and Philosophy; Dr. Arthur Lerner in Poetry Therapy; Lehman Engel in Musical Theory; Dr. Norman Feingold in Counseling Psychology; Dr. Anne de Vore in Transpersonal Psychology; Dr. Nick Warren in Physics; Dr. Melinda Lorenz in Art History; Dr. Bruce Weber in Biochemistry; Dr. Peter Warshall in Natural History; Dr. Edward de Bono in Education and Psychology; Dr. John Seeley in Behavioral Science; Dr. Russell Lockhart in The Analytical and Archetypal Psychology of C.G.Jung; Dr. Hal Stone in Clinical Psychology; and Dr. Frederick Burwick in Literature and the Natural Sciences.
