= Solar power in Denmark =

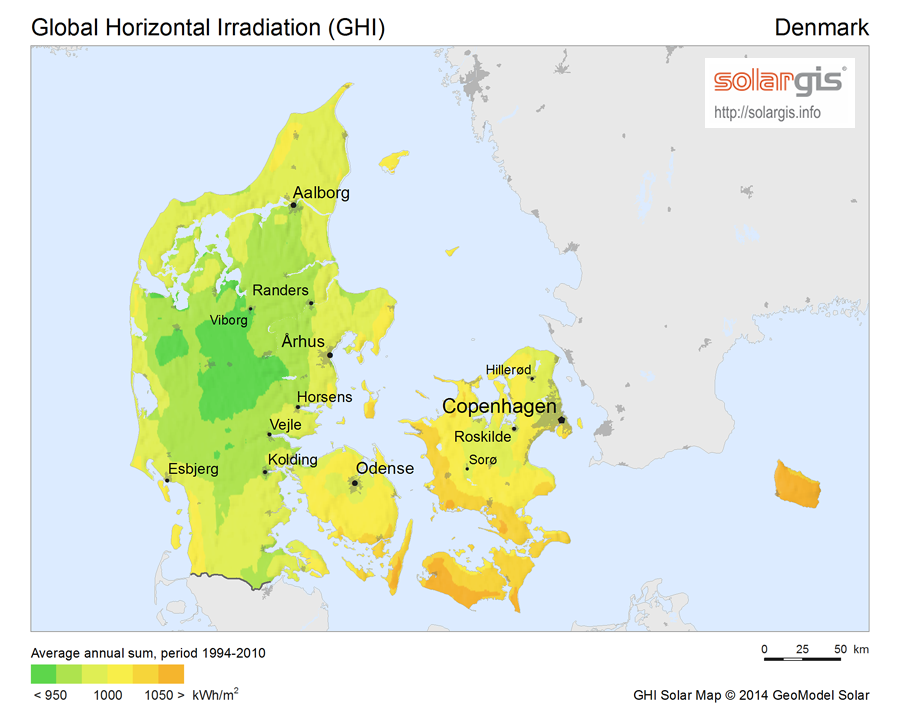
- Solar irradiation map of Denmark
- Installed capacity: 4 GW (2024) (38)
- Annual generation: 4 TWh (2024)
- Capacity per capita: 660 W (2024)
- Share of electricity: 11% (2024)

Solar power in Denmark amounts to 4,832 MW of grid-connected PV capacity at the end of September 2025, and contributes to a government target to use 100% renewable electricity by 2030 and 100% renewable energy by 2050. Solar power produced 11.2% of Danish electricity generation in 2024, the highest share in the Nordic countries.

The goal of 200 MW of photovoltaics by 2020 was reached eight years early, in 2012. Projections of future capacity have continued to increase; a total of 9,000 MW (9 GW) is expected to be installed by 2030.

Many solar-thermal district heating plants exist and are planned in Denmark.

== Installed capacity ==
Cumulated PV capacity in megawatt (MW) in Denmark since 1992

Danish solar power development
Year	Capacity (MW)	Watts per capita	Electricity generation %
2000	<1	<1	<0.1%
2010	7	1.2	<0.1%
2020	1,624	278	4.1%
2024	3,945	658	11.2%

== Timeline ==
Solar power provided 1.4 TWh, or the equivalent of 4.3% or 3.6% of Danish electricity consumption in 2021. In 2018, the number was 2.8 percent.

Denmark has lower solar insolation than many countries closer to Equator, but lower temperatures increase production. Modern solar cells decrease production by 0.25% per year.

2020

In 2020 The Danish Energy Agency announced 400 MW PV projects in the Nissum Fjord location.

2015

In 2015 only 6.3 MW was applied for out of a funding pool of 41 MW. The funding is valued at 1.02 DKK/kWh for 2015, and 0.88 for 2016. In 2016, a German solar power auction was won by a set of projects with a combined capacity of 50 MW at a price of 5.38 eurocent/kWh, which is unusually low for Northern Europe. The projects are located in Denmark due to EU rules.

2013

In 2013 PV deployment reached 216 MW of new installations, down 32 percent from the previous year.

2012

In 2012, new photovoltaic installations had surged to unprecedented levels in Denmark. This twentyfold increase in photovoltaic capacity in only one year urged the Danish government to cut back its net-metering scheme. In December 2012, Danish parliament reduced the compensation period of net-metering from a yearly to an hourly bases and increased in turn the granted feed-in tariffs. This change in policy intended to reduce the overall attractiveness of further PV deployment while keeping up some incentives for small developments. It also reduced the loss of tax revenues for the government by shifting the costs directly to the electricity consumers.

== Solar parks ==
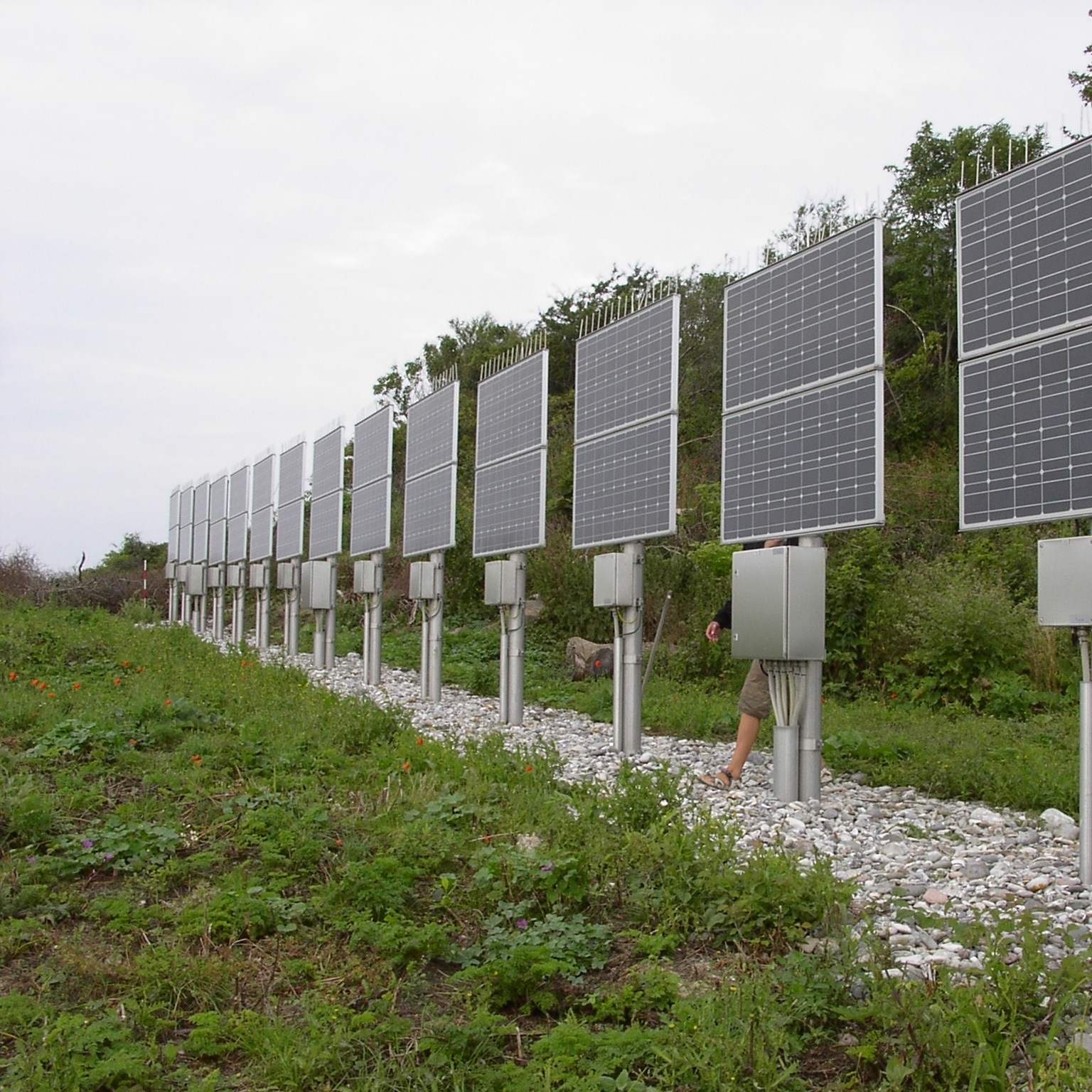
Solar panels on Hjelm island

After years of decreasing costs and subsidies, large companies paid to install new grid-scale photovoltaic power stations with several megawatt capacity without subsidies in rural areas, partially to supply data centers. Some use sheep to tend the land, a case of agrivoltaics.

A 37 MW facility with solar trackers opened in 2020.

=== List of solar parks ===
Solar park	Location	Capacity DC/AC MW	Annual production (GWh)	Area size (hectares)	Build Cost	Commissioning	Owner	Refs.
Vandel 1–3	55.7°N 9.2°E		262	330	PPA	2015–2021	BeGreen	
Kassø	55.02°N 9.26°E	300				2022 July	European Energy	
Bur/Gedmose	56.38°N 8.49°E	207		222	PPA/DKK 500m	2021 October	Bestseller	

Location map

== Solar heating ==
Solar heat plants are widespread in Denmark, with a combined heating capacity of 1.1 GW in 2019.

A large solar-thermal district heating plant 55% of the year-round heating needs of the town of Marstal. This is after an expansion of the original plant which supplied one-third of the heating needs, The plant uses seasonal thermal energy storage (STES) in the form of a large lined pits that is filled with gravel and water as the heat storage medium. The storage, which is covered with a layer of insulation, enables solar heat collected primarily in summer to be used year-round. The system includes 75,000 m^{3} of heat storage pits, 33,000 m^{2} of solar-thermal collector area, and a 1.5 MW heat pump. It also includes a biomass CHP plant for generating electricity and additional heat; however a spokesman said "If I were to calculate the economics for a project today, I would opt for a heat pump," because the cost of wood pellets has greatly increased. "At least, we can always count on solar energy to be free of charge." The expansion of the Marstal facility, completed in 2013, was part of the European Union's SunStore4 project, and can serve as a basic model for such heating plants elsewhere in Europe if local conditions are also taken into account.

In Braedstrup, the community's solar district heating system stores heat in a borehole STES (BTES) facility that uses 19,000 cubic metres of underground strata as a heat battery. It can hold 500 MWh of heat at a temperature of 65 °C. Two water tanks provide additional heat storage. When extracting heat, a 1.5 MW heat pump boosts the temperature to 80 °C, for circulation in the district heating loop. The present system is the first expansion of an original smaller system, and now provides 20% of the community's heat on an annual basis, from a solar collector area of 10,600 square metres. A second expansion is planned, to provide 50% of the heat demand from a total solar collector area of 50,000 square metres and using an enlarged BTES store. The remainder of the demand is provided by electric and gas-fired boilers.

The Braedstrup system is designed to integrate with the national electric grid. The heat pump and electric boiler are used when there is surplus wind power available on the grid, contributing to the stability of the system and maximal use of the wind power. The natural gas boiler is used when this renewable electricity is not available.

== See also ==
- Solar power by country
- Renewable energy in Denmark
- Wind power in Denmark
- Biofuel in Denmark
- Energy in Denmark
- List of renewable energy topics by country
