= William Lyon University =

William Lyon University was a former non-traditional school based in San Diego, California.

The school was named after Maj. General William Lyon (USAF), a decorated officer who served during the World War II, Korea, and Vietnam eras. Originally from Los Angeles, he founded and grew a homebuilding business in California called William Lyon Homes.

== History ==
The school was reported to have been founded as Gaylor Institute, but later became Lyon University and then William Lyon University. By 1983–84, the school received the assets and records of the former Beacon College of Washington, D. C. In the late 1980s the school changed its name to become American Commonwealth University and later, in the early 90s, was known as Huron International University. Huron International University continues to issue diplomas in Japan, but all operations of William Lyon University, and its various aliases in the U.S., have been terminated.

Another school, International College, Los Angeles, is also associated with William Lyon University. When International College, Los Angeles went out of business in the mid-1980s, its students were transferred to William Lyon University.

== Professors ==
Among the faculty of William Lyon University was Thomas R. Haines, PhD. A graduate of USIU and a distinguished professor at several Oregon and California universities, Dr. Haines developed a novel "Participatory, on-line educational program" at William Lyon University and served as its vice president from 1985 until 1990. Additional noted professors included Jack R. Gibb, PhD. A pioneer in humanistic psychology and the originator of Trust Level theory, Jack Gibb's distinguished career as a psychologist and consultant spanned five decades. Gibb held a doctorate in psychology from Stanford and previously taught at Brigham Young, Michigan State, and the University of Colorado and International College.

== Accreditation status ==
William Lyon University was not accredited by one of the U.S. regional accreditation bodies recognized by traditional universities and colleges in the United States. It was reportedly granted California State approval to operate. Later, American Commonwealth University was accredited by the National Accreditation body the Accrediting Council for Independent Colleges and Schools—ACICS. ACICS is a non-profit that provides national accreditation to non-degree programs, associate's, bachelor's, and master's degrees, but not doctoral degrees (i.e. Ph.D.).

=== Custodian of records ===
The California Department of Consumer Affairs Bureau of Private Postsecondary Education lists San Diego University for Integrative Studies as the custodian of records for William Lyon University, American Commonwealth University, and Huron International University. San Diego University of Integrative Studies is not accredited by a Regional accreditation body.
