= Biofuel in Denmark =

Biofuels play a major part in the renewable energy strategy of Denmark. Denmark is using biofuel to achieve its target of using 100% renewable energy for all energy uses by 2050. Biofuels provide a large share of energy sources in Denmark when considering all sectors of energy demand. In conjunction with Denmark's highly developed renewable energy resources in other areas, biofuels are helping Denmark meet its ambitious renewable energy targets.

The main sources of biofuels in Denmark include wood and wood products, energy from waste, straw, biogas, biodiesel and bioethanol. Biofuels have the potential to provide environmental and economic benefits but they must be carefully managed to ensure that they are truly sustainable resources. There is the potential for economic and environmental damage if biofuels are not used responsibly. Biofuel use in Europe must be certified by the EU commission before biofuels can be recorded as sustainable resources and used for national renewable energy targets.

== History ==
The oil shocks of the 1970s severely impacted Denmark, as about 90% of its energy use then came from oil, a majority of which was imported. The government was thus compelled to rethink its energy portfolio and shift the focus of its energy plans. As a result, biomass for bioenergy started being incentivized and promoted as a renewable energy source and an alternative to fossil fuels. Denmark's aim was to reduce the oil dependency and to secure energy supplies, an objective that has remained relevant in the progression of the country's energy policy agreements. The prospect of the creation of new jobs and the utilization of waste products also factored into Denmark's decision to start using biomass. Consequently, the use of biomass in the Danish energy system has continuously grown. In the last decade, bioenergy consumption in Denmark has nearly doubled, increasing by more than a factor of twelve between 1970 and present day. Over this period, biomass has been predominantly in the form of waste, straw and wood.

Currently, Denmark is striving to create an energy system by 2050 that is free of all fossil energy, and bioenergy will likely play a key role. In order to achieve this goal, Denmark has, since 1993, been increasing its development of large-scale combined heat and power plants (CHP) that combust biomass, where continuous technological improvements have been achieved over the past 20 years. The Danish strategy to reduce emissions has also included retrofitting older coal-fired plants to biomass and investing heavily into Research, Development and Demonstration (RD&D) for converting agricultural residues into second-generation (2G) bioethanol, which is then blended with gasoline for the transportation sector. RD&D activities are also in place for biodiesel for shipping and road transport.

In agreement with the European Environment Agency Scientific Committee, Denmark considers environmental sustainability as a key component of its strategy to incorporate a greater share of biofuels into its national energy portfolio. As such, it does not consider biomass produced from existent forests as carbon neutral and it counts waste biomass as double towards its Renewable Energy Target, thus favoring biomass grown on marginal land or sourced from residues. This way, the country is able to ensure that it benefits from incorporating a larger share of biomass into its energy system, as biomass sourced from plantations that have been converted from natural forest land then generate a net carbon benefit over fossil fuels. Denmark's guidelines for utilizing biomass for energy and transportation strive to ensure both environmental sustainability and efficiency aspects.

As a member state of the European Union (EU), Denmark is under commitments from its directives, which set targets for the amount of renewable energy within the national profiles, including biofuels. Following EU legislation, for example, its renewable energy use should reach 100% by 2020. However, Denmark has been highly proactive and ambitious in the targets it has set for its renewable energy and greenhouse gas emissions reduction, such as aiming for 100% renewable energy by 2050. Danish environmental legislation has been important in the process to achieving this goal as taxes on CO_{2} emissions have been in place since the 1990s, and since 2005, biofuels have been exempt from fuel taxes. Its strategy continues to support research and innovation to improve production processes and lower costs. Furthermore, the country's long tradition of promoting renewable energy as something that also contributes to environmental issues has created strong links between its environmental and energy policies. Looking ahead, the challenges for Denmark include uncertainty in future energy demand and securing a reliable supply of biomass that is sustainably produced.

== Government strategies and policy targets ==
Under the Renewable Energy Act from 2009, the Danish government plans to achieve a 20% share of biomass to its energy production by 2020. Biomass will also allow Denmark to have a spare energy capacity to guarantee a stable energy system. The Danish government set market incentives, such as feed-in tariffs and premiums for bio mass, biofuels and other renewables, in order to reach their ambitious target of being independent from fossil fuels by 2050.

In late 2016 the government decided on the 0.9% blending mandate for use of advanced biofuels. It requires all suppliers of transport fuels to blend an additional 0.9% share of advanced biofuels (i.e. straw) to the already required five percent conventional bioethanols share in gasoline.

The country has a target of quadrupling energy from biogas by 2020 with the target of using 50% of manure in the country, with the gas produced being injected directly into the national gas supply or used for electricity generation.

Denmark has been highly innovative in its energy strategy and has greatly increased energy efficiency by using combined heat and power plants (CHP plants). These plants generate electricity whilst the waste heat is simultaneously extracted. This provides energy to district heating networks, and several such plants are operating at world record levels of energy efficiency. CHP plants in Denmark are being converted to biofuel power sources, providing not only energy efficiency but also local markets and sources of income to local communities. Farmers are able to sell waste straw and biogas produced from manure, while municipal authorities can provide waste products to heat and power generators.

The small country of Denmark with just 5.7 million people is now being asked to lend its expertise to China to advise it on how to develop fuel flexibility, CHP power and heat generation. The two countries have associated initiatives which seek to improve China's vast energy requirements as the workshop of the world.

== Contribution to national energy supply by sector ==
=== Heating and cooling sector ===
Biofuel use in the heating sector, 2014
Source	GJ/year	Estimated share of total sector
Biomass	960,750,000	34.36%
Biogas	2,320,000	2.15%
Bioliquids	686,000	0.24%
Total	9,908,200	35.33%

*Estimated percentage based on proportion of total data submitted in the progress report.

*Original data converted to GJ.

Biofuels combined to provide 9,908,200 GJ of energy for Denmark's heating and cooling sector, and accounted for approximately 35.33% of the sector in 2014.

=== Electricity sector ===
Biofuel contribution to Danish electricity generation 2015
Source	Share of total generation
Wood	7.1%
Waste	2.9%
Straw	2.0%
Biogas	1.7%
Total	13.7%

*Estimated percentage based on proportion of total data submitted in the progress report.

Biofuels combined to provide 3,789 GWh in 2015. Using the IEA unit converter this equates to 13,640,000 GJ of energy, and accounted for 12.7% of electricity generated.

=== Transport Sector ===
Biofuel use in the Transport sector, 2014
Source	GJ/year	Estimated share of total sector
Biodiesel	7,063,000	4.17%
Bioethanol	1,872,000	1.10%
Hydrogen	0	0.00%
Total	9,608,000	5.27%

*Estimated percentage based on proportion of total data submitted in the progress report.

*Original data converted to GJ.

Biodiesel and Bioethanol provided the transport sector with 9,608,000 GJ of energy, and accounted for approximately 5.27% of the sector in 2014.

== Total national supply, production and use by detailed biofuel source, 2015 ==
=== Total Supply ===
Denmark's total supply of energy via biofuels, 2015
Source	Amount (GJ)
Straw	19,576.450
Wood Chips	17,366,463
Wood Pellets	40,729,731
Wood Waste	7,734,737
Biogas	6,347,791
Bio Oil	11,052,904
Firewood	24,290,000
Renewable Waste	21,624,387
Total:	148,722,463

Denmark's total supply of energy overall in 2015 was 2,523,048,939 GJ. Therefore, biofuels made up approximately 5.9% of the total supply in 2015.

=== Production ===
Denmark's total energy production via biofuels, 2015
Source	Amount (GJ)
Straw	19,576,450
Wood Chips	14,032,691
Wood Pellets	7,187,551
Wood Waste	7,734,737
Biogas	6,347,791
Bio Oil	6,018,556
Firewood	21,943,040
Renewable Waste	19,365,287
Total:	82,629,653

Denmark's total energy production in 2015 was 1,422,701,209 GJ. Therefore, biofuels made up approximately 5.8% of Denmark's total energy production in 2015.

=== Total Use ===
Denmark's total use of energy via biofuels, 2015
Source	Amount (GJ)
Straw	19,576,450
Wood Chips	17,366,463
Wood Pellets	40,729,731
Wood Waste	7,734,737
Biogas	6,347,791
Bio Oil	11,052,904
Firewood	24,490,000
Renewable Waste	21,624,387
Total:	148,922,463

Denmark's total energy use in 2015 was 2,523,048,939 GJ. Therefore, biofuels made up approximately 5.9% of Denmark's total energy use in 2015.

=== Industry and Household Use ===
Denmark's industrial and household use of energy via biofuels, 2015
Source	Amount (GJ)
Straw	19,187,179
Wood Chips	17,366,463
Wood Pellets	36,185,035
Wood Waste	7,734,737
Biogas	6,347,791
Bio Oil	6,347,791
Firewood	24,490,000
Renewable Waste	21,624,387
Total:	142,547,446

Denmark's total industrial and household energy use in 2015 was 1,837,851,411 GJ. Therefore, biofuels made up approximately 7.8% of Denmark's industrial and household energy use in 2015.

== Overview of biofuel sources ==
Renewable thermal net electricity generation (GWh) 2007-2014.
Renewable thermal net electricity generation 2007-2014.

Renewable energy (RE) thermal generation includes both electricity generated from biofuels and electricity generated from the fraction of waste that is biodegradable. Since 2010, RE thermal generation in Denmark has accounted for approximately 4000 GWh per year.

Biofuels also play an increasingly important part in Denmark's district heating. The proportion of heat generated by biofuels has been rising since the 1980s, and by 2013 close to 45% of district heat was produced by renewables. A rough calculation of the 60% of households provided with district heat would imply that through this means alone renewable fuels provided just over a quarter of Denmark's heating and hot water needs in that year.

Renewable thermal generation by source 2009-2014 (GWh)
	2009	2010	2011	2012	2013	2014
RE generation from waste	912	863	825	792	776	792
Biogas	340	355	350	373	408	447
Biomass	1,777	2,958	2,680	2,771	2,812	2,631
Total renewable thermal	3,029	4,176	3,855	3,936	3,996	3,870

=== Waste to energy ===
RE generation from waste reduced slightly over the period from 2009 to 2014 by 792 GWh. This reduction was due to less availability of waste and the reduced proportion of waste being classified as renewable energy in 2011. Overall about 2.6% of national electricity was generated by RE generation from waste. Denmark incinerates close to 3 million tonnes of waste each year to produce electricity and heat; most of this heat is produced domestically with a smaller share imported from abroad. There are 28 waste incineration plants in the country. The waste powered CHP plants may also co-burn additional fossil fuels, including oil and natural gas, but biomass is increasingly used to improve the performance of waste energy production. Only the carbon neutral biodegradable part of waste is classified as renewable energy generation, which was defined as 55% of total waste from 2011 (in 2009 it was 58.8%). Total waste provided 20% of district heating generation and between 4% and 5% of electricity generation in the country. Energy production from waste over the next ten years is expected to remain at similar levels, however, new pre-treatments of waste may be developed.

=== Biogas ===
Biogas generation has been rising steadily and reached 447 GWh of electricity production in 2014, contributing about 1.5% of Denmark's electricity. Approximately 75% of Denmark's 120 biogas-generating plants are 3 MW or smaller in size. A further 15 larger CHP plants account for the remaining approximately 25% of biogas consumption and co-fire biogas, mostly with natural gas. The largest source of Biogas is from manure, other sources include water treatment plants and landfill sites. Many of the smaller plants are located on farms and or other sources of biogas. Smaller biogas plants tend not to contribute heat to district heating networks. Denmark intends to increase production and use of biogas from 4 PJ consumption in 2015 to 17 PJ by 2020 with the goal of using 50% of manure in the country. Most of the new biogas is likely to be injected directly into the gas system and used for industry and transport.

=== Biomass ===
Biomass provides the largest share of renewable energy in Denmark when considering the electricity sector, heating and cooling sector and transport sector combined. The fuel contributed to approximately 8.6% of total electricity generation in Denmark generating 2,631 GWh of electricity in 2014. Total consumption of biomass amounted to 107 PJ in 2013. There were 39 CHP plants using biomass as a fuel in 2014, consuming approximately 2.7 million tonnes to produce heat and power, and corresponding to 40.94 PJ consumption in that year. Biomass is sometimes co-fired with other fuels including a small percentage that is co-fired with waste. Around 40% of the biomass used in Denmark is imported, including the majority of wood pellets.

Biomass by source 2013
Biomass Source	Percentage share
Wood pellets	33%
Firewood	21%
Straw	20%
Wood chips	17%
Wood waste	9%

Electricity generated from biomass increased dramatically in 2010 following in increased share in its use in a number of power plants. Between 2009 and 2014 production of power increased by around 50%. By 2024 biomass is expected to double the percentage of renewable energy share from 15% to 30% of renewable electricity production in Denmark. Total consumption of Biomass is expected to rise to 115PJ by 2024. A number of power stations are being converted from using coal to using wood pellets as fuel. Some smaller CHP plants are converting from using natural gas to biomass.

== See also ==
- Renewable energy in Denmark
- Wind power in Denmark
- Solar power in Denmark
