= SustainableEnergy =

Danish non-profit organization

- Founded: 1975
- Founder: individuals
- Type: National association
- Purpose: renewable energy, sustainable energy, environmentalism
- Location: Denmark
- Region served: Denmark
- Method: newsletter, advice, education, lobbying
- Members: 2,500
- Website: www.sustainableenergy.dk

SustainableEnergy (VedvarendeEnergi), which was called Danish Organisation for Renewable Energy (OVE) until 2010, is a non-governmental, non-profit, membership based association. SustainableEnergy was founded in 1975 based on a popular movement for renewable energy in Denmark with close relationship to the anti-nuclear movement (OOA).

== Aim ==
SustainableEnergy's aim is to work for a resource- and environment-conscious energy policy through grassroots initiatives to reach 100% renewable energy supply in Denmark by 2030.

== Objectives ==
SustainableEnergy's job is to:

- to influence the development of the Danish energy policy to be more resource- and environment-conscious especially by facilitating the use of renewable energy.
- to get the people informed of their possibilities to make their own action by installing renewable-energy systems in their own homes or institutions in Denmark.

== Structure ==
Members: Danish individuals who are users of renewable energy, as well as of groups, high schools, and companies working for renewable energy in Denmark. A special category of the members are the local Energy and Environment Offices, local popular information centers. In total, SustainableEnergy has about 2500 members.

Decisions: SustainableEnergy's main decisions are made at the yearly General Assembly of the members and the bimonthly Board Meetings. The Members of the Board is elected at the General Assembly. The Chairman is elected by the Board.

Information: The members are informed through a bimonthly magazine, in several subject-specific meetings, and a web site.

== Activities in Denmark ==
Political Lobbying

- Seeking to be represented in the energy related law and regulation formulating processes through hearings and committees.
- Evaluating and producing policy and campaign papers on renewable energy issues.

Information Dissemination

- Publishing a Danish bi-monthly magazine "Renewable Energy and Environment" (In Danish: Vedvarende Energi & Miljø for the members).
- Offering a homepage with keys to literature, demonstration plants, companies and other relevant sites on the internet in Danish.
- Promoting information campaigns and giving advice in a close co-operation with the offices of "Energy Services" and "Local Energy and Environmental Offices (SEK)" e.g., the "Campaign for converting houses from electric heating systems into more environmental friendly energy sources like renewable energy" or Energy efficient windows".
- Involved in the Schools Energy Forum (SEF) aiming to implement more and better education on energy and environmental matters. Through SEF, SustainableEnergy is partner to the Climate Caravan, which is offering educational possibilities in the schools in 98 municipalities of Denmark.
- Organising seminars, meetings at which technicians and users share knowledge and experiences. The main topics discussed are wind power, solar energy, biogas, energy efficiency, and renewable energy in green cities, along with integration of renewable energy into energy systems such as those for local cogeneration of heat and power.

== Cooperation in Denmark ==
SustainableEnergy has gone into co-operation with many other organisations interested in energy in Denmark. Among others:

- SustainableEnergy's bi-monthly magazine is published in cooperation with National Association for Organic Building and the Association of Energy Offices (SEK).
- SustainableEnergy is one of the 20 members of the Danish 92-Group (In Danish: 92-gruppen) where Danish environment and development organisations are cooperating since the UNCED Conference preparations in 1992. E.g., OVE was made a Climate Campaign in 2002 in cooperation with Greenpeace-Danmark, WWF-Denmark, Nature and Youth (in Danish: Natur og Ungdom), The Ecological Council (in Danish: Økologisk Råd), and FEU.

== Cooperation internationally ==
- SustainableEnergy is active in projects in Europe, Asia and Africa to defend environment and decrease poverty. SustainableEnergy has or has had projects in Thailand, Vietnam, Mozambique, Mongolia and in South Africa in co-operation with local NGOs.

SustainableEnergy plays a significant role in international networking among NGOs. SustainableEnergy is member of:

- INFORSE-Europe, International Network for Sustainable Energy, a NGO network with its International Secretariat based in Denmark, and with seven Regional Co-ordinators in different continents. SustainableEnergy is one of the founders of INFORSE in 1992.
- CAN-Europe, Climate Action Network - Europe, a NGO Network with a Secretariat based in Brussels, Belgium.
- European ECO-forum Pan-European network of NGOs on environment.

== See also ==
- Anti-nuclear movement
- Renewable energy
- Sustainable energy
- Danish Forest and Nature Agency
- Danish Society for Nature Conservation
