= Institute for Energy Research =

Energy policy organization

- Formation: 1989; 37 years ago
- Founder: Robert L. Bradley Jr.
- Founded at: Houston, Texas, U.S.
- Type: Nonprofit public policy research
- Tax ID no.: 76-0149778
- Location: Washington, D.C., U.S.
- Board of directors: Steven F. Hayward
- Revenue: $2.26 million (2024)
- Expenses: $2.18 million (2024)
- Staff: 10 (2024)
- Volunteers: 5 (2024)
- Website: instituteforenergyresearch.org

The Institute for Energy Research (IER) is a Washington, D.C.–based free market non-profit organization that "conducts intensive research and analysis on the functions, operations, and government regulation of global energy markets." IER supports the use of fossil fuels.

== History ==
The IER is the successor organization to the Institute for Humane Studies—Texas, a foundation established in 1984 by classical-liberalism advocate Greg Rehmke of the Institute for Humane Studies in Menlo Park, California, of which billionaire businessman and political donor Charles Koch was a director. After failing to pay the Texas state franchise tax, IHST lost its charter in 1989, and was later rebranded as the Institute for Energy Research, or IER, under the presidency of Robert L. Bradley Jr., the former director of public policy analysis for Enron.

IER began by distributing quarterly reports to a small but growing list of donors in the early 1990s and eventually expanded its publishing capabilities to include highly publicized studies. It was not until 2001 when Bradley secured funding to make IER a full-time organization. In 2007, IER was moved to Washington, D.C. where it transformed itself into an energy think tank producing research and analysis on global energy markets.

In 2009, an article in Mother Jones magazine said IER was among the most prominent organizations questioning the existence and extent of anthropogenic climate change.

In 2016, Thomas Pyle, president of IER and AEA, was appointed to the US Department of Energy's transition team after the 2016 United States elections. On 15 November, he delivered a memo entitled "What to Expect from the Trump Administration" which has been described as a "fossil fuel industry wish list". It called for withdrawing from the 2015 Paris Agreement, overturning the Clean Power Plan, opening federal lands to exploitation for coal and oil development, and rolling back CAFE fuel economy standards.

IER is a member of the advisory board of Project 2025, a collection of conservative and right-wing policy proposals from the Heritage Foundation to reshape the United States federal government and consolidate executive power should the Republican nominee win the 2024 presidential election.

== Leadership ==
The Institute's CEO and founder, Robert L. Bradley Jr., is a senior fellow at the American Institute for Economic Research and Energy & Climate Change Fellow at the Institute of Economic Affairs in London. He has written eight books, including Energy: The Master Resource; Climate Alarmism Reconsidered; and Edison to Enron.

== Funding ==
IER is a nonprofit 501(c)(3) organization and is funded by tax deductible contributions from individuals, foundations and corporations. IER says that it has not sought for or accepted financial support from the government. IER has been described as a front group for the fossil fuel industry, since it has accepted financial donations from firms in that sector.

== American Energy Alliance ==
The Institute for Energy Research has a political arm, the American Energy Alliance (AEA). According to its website, "AEA’s mission is to enlist and empower energy consumers to encourage policymakers to support free market policies. […] Energy consumers, not bureaucrats, should decide the mix between various sources of energy. The tax code should not be used to pick energy winners and losers."

In 2009, AEA ran television advertisements in opposition to the American Clean Energy and Security Act, also known as the Waxman-Markey Bill, that proposed an emissions trading plan to reduce greenhouse gas emissions in order to address climate change.

In 2013, AEA provided an online petition to U.S. Secretary of State John Kerry regarding the U.S. federal government administration's approval of the Keystone XL pipeline extension. AEA supports approval of the pipeline.

The AEA opposes a Wind Production Tax Credit.

== See also ==
- Robert P. Murphy
