= List of wind farms in Lithuania =

As of 2016, there were over 160 operational wind farms in Lithuania, but the majority of them consisted of small farms generating less than 2 MW.

== Wind farms ==
Only farms with bigger than 3 MW capacity are listed.

Largest wind farms in Lithuania
Name	Capacity (MW)	Comments
Akmenėliai Wind Park	6	
Benaičiai-1 Wind Park	34	
Berlainiai Wind Park	4	
Čiūteliai Wind Park	39.1	
IKEA Group Wind Park	45	
Didšiliai Wind Park	16	
Didšiliai-474 Wind Park	5.4	
Dolomitas Wind Park	6	
Kreivėnai Wind Park	20	
Kreivėnai-II Wind Park	10	
Kreivėnai-III Wind Park	14.9	
Kunigiškiai Wind Park	7.5	
Laukžemė Wind Park	16	
Lendimai Wind Park	6	
Liepynė Wind Park	9.13	
Mockiai Wind Park	12	
Pagėgiai 13	73.5	Biggest wind farm in Baltic States
Pakertai Wind Park	6	
Relit Wind Park	4.9	
Renerga–1 Wind Park	7.5	
Rotuliai-II Wind Park	24	
Seirijai Wind Park	6	
Sūdėnai Wind Park	14	
Šilalė Wind Park	13.8	
Vydmantai Wind Park	30	
4Energia Wind Park	60	

== See also ==
- Energy in Lithuania
