= Trtar-Krtolin Wind Farm =

Croatian wind farm

Trtar-Krtolin wind farm
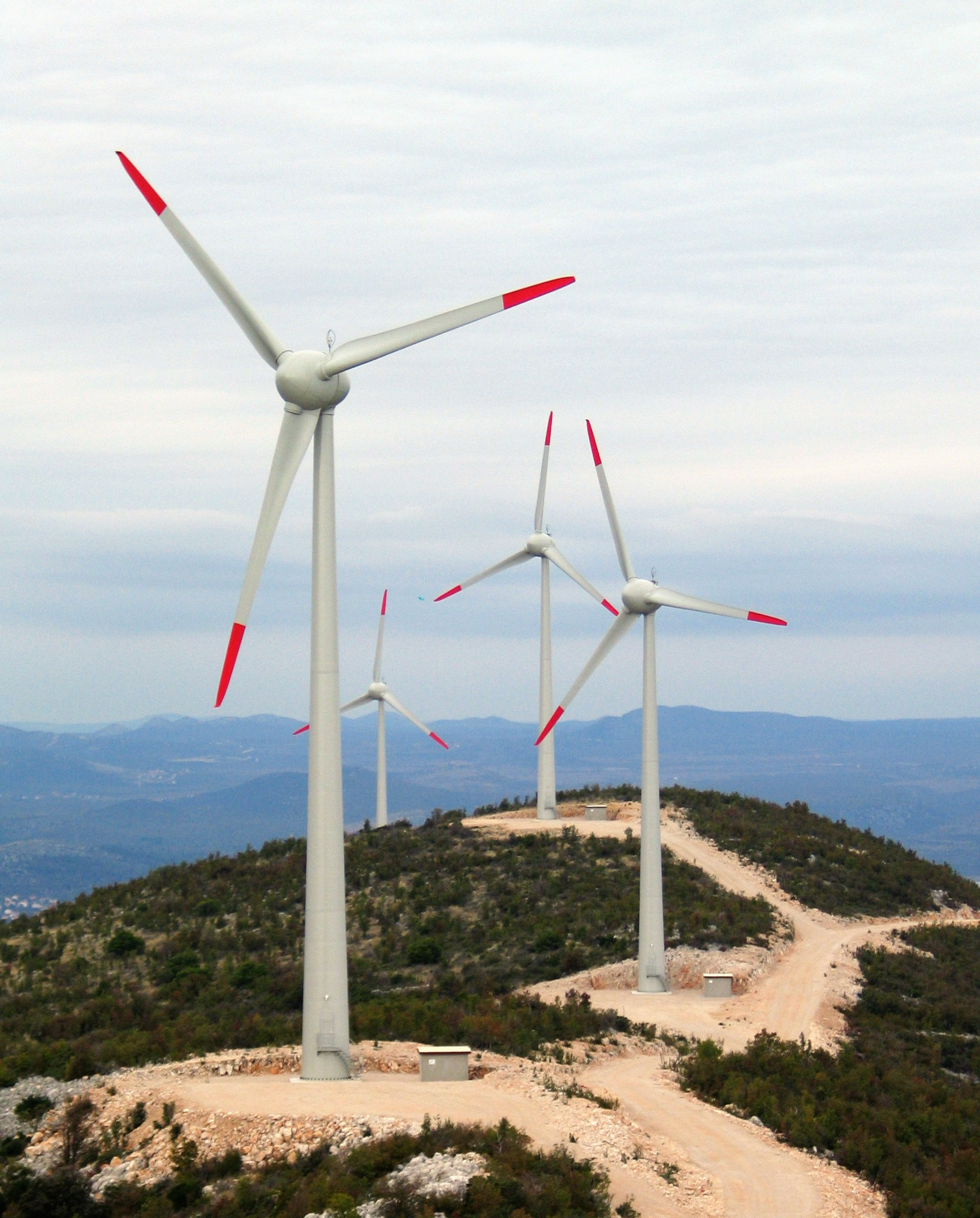
- Four of the fourteen turbines of Trtar-Krtolin
- Country: Croatia
- Location: Trtar
- Coordinates: 43°45′09″N 15°58′04″E
- Status: Under construction
- Construction began: November 2005
- Commission date: 2006
- Construction cost: 12.5 million €
- Owner: WPD
- Operator: WPD
- Site elevation: 450 m (1,480 ft)

Power generation
- Units operational: 14 x 800 kW
- Make and model: Enercon E48/800
- Nameplate capacity: 11.2 MW
- Annual net output: 28 GWh

External links
- Commons: Related media on Commons

The Trtar-Krtolin wind farm is a wind farm located in Croatia. With a capacity of 11.2 MW, it was constructed in 2006. It is composed of 14 Enercon E48/800 turbines, with a capacity of 800 kW each.
