= Wiard Siebels =

German politician (born 1978)

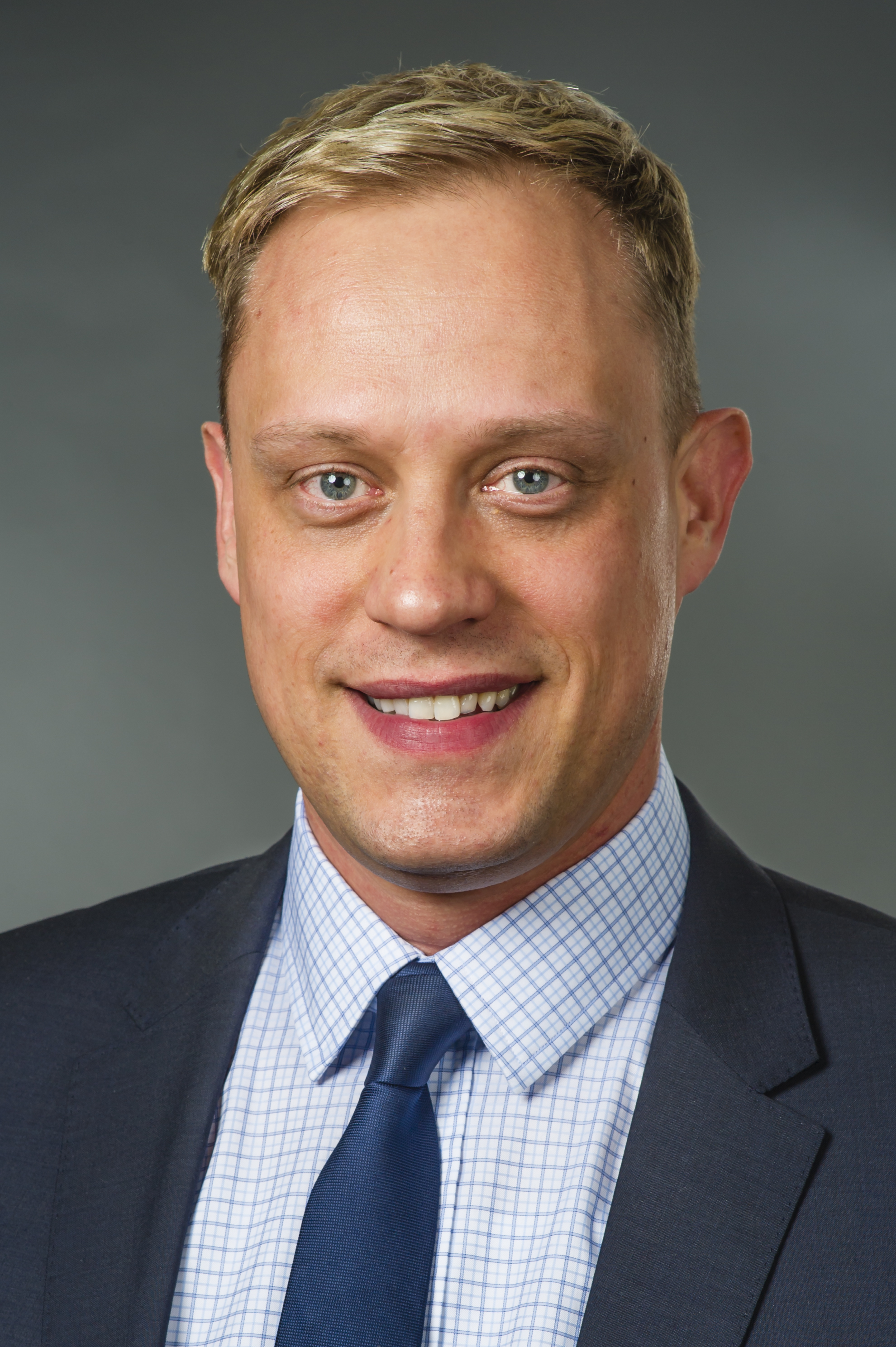
- Siebels in 2018

Member of the Landtag of Lower Saxony
- Incumbent
- Assumed office 26 February 2008
- Preceded by: Wolfgang Ontijd
- Constituency: Aurich

Personal details
- Born: 16 March 1978 (age 48) Aurich
- Party: Social Democratic Party (since 1993)

Wiard Friedrich Siebels (born 16 March 1978 in Aurich) is a German politician serving as a member of the Landtag of Lower Saxony since 2022. He has served as chief whip of the Social Democratic Party since 2017.
