= Pagėgiai 13 =

Wind farm in Lithuania

- Country: Lithuania
- Location: Pagėgiai eldership, Pagėgiai Municipality
- Coordinates: 55°9′57″N 22°1′27″E
- Status: Operational
- Commission date: 2016
- Construction cost: 110 million euros
- Owner: Amberwind
- Operator: Amberwind

Wind farm
- Type: Onshore
- Hub height: 73–134 m (240–440 ft)

Power generation
- Units operational: 30
- Make and model: Enercon GmbH
- Nameplate capacity: 73.5 MW
- Annual net output: 200 GW·h

External links
- Website: www.vejovatas.lt/amberwind/

Pagėgiai 13 is the largest wind park in Lithuania and the Baltic States. The park started operating in 2016.
