= Luise Dornemann =

- Born: Luise Fremy; 23 February 1901; Aurich, East Frisia, Province of Hanover, Prussia, Germany
- Died: 17 January 1992 (aged 90); Berlin, Germany
- Occupations: teacher women's rights activist politician
- Political party: KPD; SED
- Spouse: Hans Dornemann (1898-1933)

Luise Dornemann (born Luise Fremy: 23 February 1901 - 17 January 1992) was a women's rights activist-politician and, in her later years, a writer.

== Life ==
Luise Fremy was born in Aurich, a midsized town in East Frisia, in the northwestern corner of Germany. Her father was a legal official. She completed her schooling locally in 1917, but by 1920 had moved away to Aachen where, in 1920, she undertook a university entrance exam at the higher grammar school ("Oberlyzeum"), and where just a year later she emerged, qualified, from the city's teachers' training college. After a period of unpaid volunteer work as an assistant with the "Aachener Post" (newspaper) during 1921/22, she embarked on her teaching career in the Ruhr region. That lasted only till 1924, however, at which point she took charge of a Sex Advice Clinic in Düsseldorf, which she would continue to head up till 1933.

The postwar decade was a time of social and political unrest underpinned by austerity and acute economic hardship. Luise Dornemann became increasingly radicalized, and in 1928 became a member of the Communist Party ("Kommunistische Partei Deutschlands" / KPD). Two years later, in 1930, she started to work at the national head office of the "National Association of proletarian free thinkers" (" Zentral-Verband der Proletarischen Freidenker Deutschlands"), an organisation for which her husband served in a leadership capacity as "secretary". In 1932 she was a co-founder, in Düsseldorf, of the "United Association for Proletarian Sexual Reform and Mothers' Protection" ("Einheitsverbandes für proletarische Sexualreform und Mutterschutz").

After several years of intensifying political polarisation, everything changed at the start of 1933 when the Nazis took power and lost no time in transforming Germany into a one-party dictatorship. Luise's husband, Hans Dornemann, was murdered in Düsseldorf by Nazi paramilitaries in March 1933. The Nazi government quickly put an end to the sexual reform movement which she had championed, with abortion laws becoming more restrictive than before. Fairly soon after her husband's murder Luise Dornemann moved to Berlin where she lived "underground" (i.e. failing to register her domicile with the town hall), supporting herself with sewing and household work. She was also undertaking "illegal political work", in contact with the resistance activist Rudolf Scheffel among others.

During the middle 1930s the authorities became increasingly adept at locating political opponents. Those with a documented Communist past were at particular risk of arrest, detention, torture and worse. In 1936 Dornemann succeeded in leaving Berlin and finding her way to London. Relatively little is known of her activities during the decade that followed. She was a leading member of a refugee organisation founded in 1939, the "Free German League of Culture" ("Freier Deutscher Kulturbund"), associated with that organisation's "Social Advisory Centre". She later also served as political secretary to the British Council for German Democracy.

She was able to return to Berlin only in 1947, settling in the eastern part of the city, which since May 1945 had been administered as part of the Soviet occupation zone. Very soon she joined the Socialist Unity Party ("Sozialistische Einheitspartei Deutschlands," / SED), which had been formed in April of the previous year through a contentious merger (for most purposes effective only in the Soviet zone) between the former communist party and the Social Democratic Party. The party merger had been intended to ensure that a right wing populist party would never again come to power because of divisions on the political left, but by the later 1940s the SED itself was well on the way to becoming the ruling party in a new kind of one-party dictatorship. Along with the SED she also joined the Democratic Women's League ("Demokratischer Frauenbund Deutschlands" / DFD), a state backed mass organisation which now provided a base for Luise Dornemann's political career progression.

Between 1948 and 1951 she served in the secretariat of the national executive of the DFD, in a senior post which according to one source made her the organisation's de facto chief executive. She held specific responsibility for schools, the arts, training and education. Later she took responsibility within the DFD for international relations and became the DFD representative with the Women's International Democratic Federation (WIDF). Founded in 1945, the WIDF was originally headquartered in Paris, but it was increasingly seen as a Soviet front organisation: after it was expelled from Paris in 1951 it moved its headquarters to East Berlin. Dornemann retired from her positions with the DFD and the WIDF in 1953. She nevertheless remained a member of the DFD national executive till 1989.

She was still only 52 when she withdrew from her high-profile political positions, and for the next ten years, till 1963, she worked at the Party Central Committee's Institute for Marxism–Leninism. In addition, between 1960 and 1962 she served on the politburo Women's Commission. After 1963 she supported herself as a fee-lance author.

Her years at the institute were not unproductive. Dornemann's most notable works were two biographies, both of politically important women. Her biography of Jenny Marx was first published in 1953 and had reached its tenth edition by 1984. It was translated into the languages of all the principal socialist states. In addition, a Japanese language version appeared in 1956. Her biography of Clara Zetkin first appeared in 1957 and had reached nine editions by 1989. She was also involved in putting together various compilations. From an Anglo-American perspective her published contributions are "ideologically orthodox", which no doubt accounts for their commercial success before 1989.

== Personal ==
Luise Fremy married Hans Dornemann (1898–1933) in 1923.

== Awards and honours ==
- 1956 Clara Zetkin Medal
- 1958 Medal for antifascist resistance ("Medaille für Kämpfer der Widerstandsbewegung 1933-1945")
- 1959 Patriotic Order of Merit in silver
- 1961 East German medal for merit ("Verdienstmedaille der DDR")
- 1968 DFD literature prize
- 1976 Patriotic Order of Merit in gold
- 1981 Patriotic Order of Merit gold clasp
- 1986 Order of Karl Marx
