= Georg von Eucken-Addenhausen =

German jurist, politician and mayor

Georg Udo Victor von Eucken-Addenhausen (29 July 1855 – 1 May 1942) was a German jurist, politician, and mayor of Jena.

== Life ==
Georg Eucken was born Aurich in 1855, the son of the Hanoverian Rittmeister Carl Eucken (22 July 1825 – 6 November 1893) and Caroline von Frese (9 October 1831 – 30 March 1916). The additional name of Addenhausen was conferred by George V of Hanover after the name of their family estate in East Frisia.

He studied law and legal science at the universities of Marburg, Munich, Tübingen, and Strasbourg, and from 1877 to 1881 he was a legal counsel in Aurich, Isenhagen, Göttingen, Wiesbaden, Hanover, and Merseburg. During his period of legal traineeship (Referendarzei), he was promoted in Jena in 1879 to Doctor of Law. In 1884 he completed his Accessorexamen.

Georg von Eucken-Addenhausen married Marianne Charlotte Emma Mathilde Oppermann (8 July 1860 – 13 May 1942), with whom he had four children.

== Career ==
Eucken entered municipal politics for the first time as First Mayor (Oberburgermeister) of Jena in 1881. On 1 April 1885, he was appointed mayor of Eisenach, also in Thuringia, a position which he held being appointed in May 1893 to administrator for the administrative district of Eisenach. From 1894 to 1902 he served as a representative in, and was briefly vice-president of, the state parliament of Saxe-Weimar-Eisenach. In 1902, he was appointed as a senior advisor to the Reichsamt of the Interior, where he worked on the revision of the Health Insurance Act and took over the supervision of the Kiel Canal and the Reichspostdampfer line (mail service by steamboat). At the request of Frederick Augustus II, Grand Duke of Oldenburg, whom he met in Travemünde in 1905, Eucken transferred to the service of the Grand Duchy of Oldenburg and was appointed ambassador to Prussia and permanent representative in Berlin on 25 October 1905, while also being entrusted with representing the duchy of Anhalt and the principalities of Lippe-Detmold and Schaumburg-Lippe. In 1906 he was elevated to the nobility. Eucken served in the First World War from 1914 to 1916 and received several awards, after which he resumed his office as a federal counsellor, an office which he resigned on 12 November 1918 following the resignation of the Grand Duke of Oldenburg. In 1919 he briefly acted as a representative of the Oldenburg and Lippe regional governments at the Constitutional Assembly in Weimar, and then moved to his estate Sielhof in Neuharlingersiel.

In 1932 he became president of the Stände of East Frisia, and from 1934 to 1942 was president of the East Frisian Landschaft. He was also a member of the Central Committee for the Inner Mission of the German Evangelical Church, a patron of the East Frisian Agricultural College and, from 1908, a knight of East Frisia. He was also a member of the board of the Deutscher Kriegerbund, a member of the executive committee of the German Association for Insurance Science and a member of the board of several commercial enterprises. In addition, he was also a proponent of the expansion of adult education, a cause which he supported since 1906. In 1924 he was involved in the founding of the first agricultural college in Jever and Aurich, following the Danish model.

== Literature ==
- Eucken-Addenhausen, Georg (von) In: Hans Friedl, Wolfgang Günther, Hilke Günther-Arndt, Heinrich Schmidt (Hrsg.): Biographisches Handbuch zur Geschichte des Landes Oldenburg. Oldenburg 1992, ISBN 3-89442-135-5. p. 181. (online).
- Eucken-Addenhausen, Georg, in: Dirk Hainbuch; Florian Tennstedt (Bearb.): Biographisches Lexikon zur Geschichte der deutschen Sozialpolitik 1871 bis 1945. Band 1: Sozialpolitiker im Deutschen Kaiserreich 1871 bis 1918. Kassel University Press, Kassel, 2010, p. 43 f. ISBN 978-3-86219-038-6 (print), ISBN 978-3-86219-039-3 (scanned) (Volltext, PDF; 2,2 MB)

Preceded by ??	Mayor of Jena; 1881–1885	Succeeded by Georg Thieler
