= Benaičiai-1 Wind Park =

Wind farm in Lithuania

- Official name: Benaičiai-1 vėjo jėgainių parkas
- Country: Lithuania
- Location: Benaičiai, Kretinga District Municipality
- Coordinates: 56°5′43″N 21°13′44″E
- Status: Operational
- Commission date: 2010
- Construction cost: 212 million litas
- Owner: Renerga
- Operator: Renerga

Wind farm
- Type: Onshore
- Hub height: 97 m (318 ft)

Power generation
- Units operational: 30
- Make and model: Enercon GmbH: E-82
- Nameplate capacity: 34 MW

External links
- Website: www.renerga.lt

Benaičiai-1 Wind Park (Lithuanian: Benaičiai-1 vėjo jėgainių parkas) is one of the largest wind parks in Lithuania and the Baltic States. It is located next to the Laukžemė Wind Park.
