= Čiūteliai Wind Park =

Wind farm in Lithuania

- Official name: Čiūtelių vėjo jėgainių parkas
- Country: Lithuania
- Location: Čiūteliai, Šilutė District Municipality
- Coordinates: 55°29′26″N 21°23′14″E
- Status: Operational
- Construction began: 2010
- Commission date: 2012
- Construction cost: 200 million litas
- Owner: Naujoji energija
- Operator: Naujoji energija

Wind farm
- Type: Onshore
- Hub height: 108 m (354 ft)

Power generation
- Units operational: 17
- Make and model: Enercon GmbH: E82 E2
- Nameplate capacity: 39.1 MW
- Annual net output: 100 GW·h

External links
- Website: www.neg.lt

Čiūteliai Wind Park (Lithuanian: Čiūtelių vėjo jėgainių parkas) is one of the largest wind park in Lithuania and the Baltic States. In 2014, the park generated more than 98 GWh.
