= Liefmann Calmer =

French noble

Liefmann Calmer, lord of Picquigny and vidame (avoué) of Amiens (1711 in Aurich, Hanover – December 17, 1784 in Paris) was an important personage in French Jewry of the 18th century. His full synagogal name was Moses Eliezer Lipmann ben Kalonymus — in German, "Kallmann," whence the family name "Calmer" is said to have been derived. From "Lipmann" undoubtedly came "Liefmann." Calmer first moved to The Hague, and later left the Dutch Republic for France, where he made a fortune in commerce and became official purveyor to King Louis XV. In 1769 he obtained French letters of naturalization. He exerted considerable influence in public affairs and became administrator of the "German" Jews in Paris.

On April 27, 1774, Pierre Briet, lord of Benapré, as front man for Calmer, bought from the creditors of the duke of Chaulnes the lordship of the barony of Picquigny and the function of vidame of Amiens in the Somme for 1,500,000 francs. A little later it was declared that the purchase was made in the name of Liefmann Calmer, full citizen of The Hague and naturalized Frenchman. Because he was not a nobleman, he cannot use the title of baron of Picquigny but only the title of lord of the barony of Picquigny. Only the king of France can created a baron, the fact to buy a barony does not transform the owner into a baron. He thus vidame of Amiens, and the first French Jewish man with ecclesiastic feudal functions. The titles included feudal privileges, among which was the appointment of priests. This led to the fierce opposition of the Catholic Church to the sale. He was first a merchant, so he sold quickly those lordship with profits.

Calmer had three sons, two of whom were guillotined during the Reign of Terror in the French Revolution. The third died without issue in 1824.
