= Aloys Wobben =

German billionaire businessman (1952–2021)

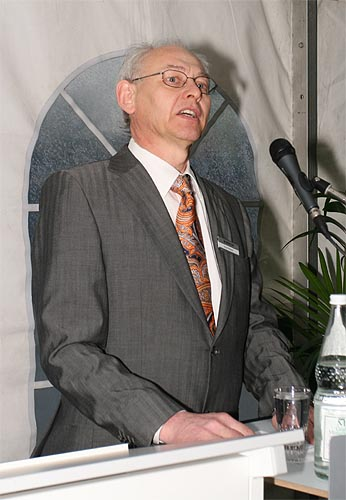
- Wobben in 2008
- Born: 22 January 1952; Rastdorf, West Germany
- Died: 31 July 2021 (aged 69)
- Education: University of Oldenburg
- Occupation: Businessman
- Title: Founder and owner of Enercon
- Children: 1

Aloys Wobben (22 January 1952 – 31 July 2021) was a German billionaire businessman, engineer, and the founder and owner of the wind turbine company Enercon. He was one of the 50 richest people in Germany, with a fortune estimated at €4.78 billion, as of November 2020. As of August 2021, Forbes estimated his net worth to be US$7.1 billion.

== Early life ==
Aloys Wobben was born in West Germany. He studied electrical engineering and earned a german Diplom Engineer degree (equivalent to a Master's degree) from the University of Oldenburg.

== Career ==
In 1984 he founded the wind turbine manufacturer Enercon in Aurich. He began developing and producing wind turbines with three employees. In the following years, Enercon developed into one of the most successful companies in the German wind energy industry. In 1993, Wobben switched production to the gearless wind turbine with full converter that he had developed. The Enercon E-40 turbine met expectations and ensured the company's worldwide success.

For health reasons, Wobben withdrew from the operational business in 2012 and transferred his company shares to the Aloys-Wobben Foundation with effect from 1 October 2012. The foundation thus became the sole shareholder of the Enercon Group.

According to Forbes, Wobben had a net worth of $7.1 billion as of August 2021.

== Personal life ==
Wobben was married, with one child and lived in Aurich.

He died in August 2021, after a long illness.

== Recognition ==
- Order of Merit of the Federal Republic of Germany
- 2000 German Environmental Prize of the German Federal Environmental Foundation
- 2004 European Solar Prize from Eurosolar in the category "Special Prize for Special Personal Commitment"
- 2006 Honorary doctorate from the University of Kassel
- 2006 Indigenat, a kind of "honorary citizenship", from the Ostfriesische Landschaft for services to the East Frisian economy
- 2008 Rudolf Diesel Medal in Gold from the German Institute for Invention (DIE)
- 2009 Lower Saxony State Prize
