= Georg Thieler =

German jurist and mayor

Georg Thieler (31 December 1854 – 10 February 1945) was a German jurist and mayor of Jena from 1885 to 1889.

== Life and career ==
Born in Osnabrück, Thieler was the son of a building inspector. After finishing his Abitur he studied legal science at the University of Göttingen. While there in 1874, he joined the Studentenverbindung Holzminda. In the summer of 1878 he completed his studies with a Promotion.

In 1885, he succeeded Georg von Eucken-Addenhausen as mayor of Jena, an office he held until 31 August 1889. Afterwards he moved to Koberwitz. In 1902 he became director of the Herkules-Brauerei in Kassel, in 1909 executive director (Geschäftsführer) of the Hergenrather Tonwerk GmbH in Hergenrath, then of a factory in Aachen. From 1923 to 1926 he worked at the Federal Equalization Office (Reichsausgleichsamt) in Düsseldorf. He died in Bad Sooden in February 1945.

He was a member of the Union for Thuringian History and Archaeology (Verein für Thüringische Geschichte und Altertumskunde).

== Publications ==
- Bericht über öffentliche Armenpflege und Wohltätigkeit in der Großherzoglichen Residenz- und Universitäts-Stadt Jena für das Jahr 1885 und 1886. Jena 1887. (in German)
- Bericht über die Verwaltung und die Betriebs-Ergebnisse der Brauerei der Stadt Jena i.J. 1887/88. Jena 1888. (in German)

== Literature ==
- Helge Dvorak: Biographisches Lexikon der Deutschen Burschenschaft. Image. 1, Part. 8, Supplement L–Z. Winter, Heidelberg 2014, ISBN 978-3-8253-6051-1, pp. 412–413.
- Mitgliederverzeichnisse der Verbindung und der Burschenschaft Holzminda, Göttingen, 1888 ff.

Preceded by Georg von Eucken-Addenhausen	Mayor of Jena; 1885 – 1889	Succeeded by Gottlieb Heinrich Singer
