= Aurich =

- Town
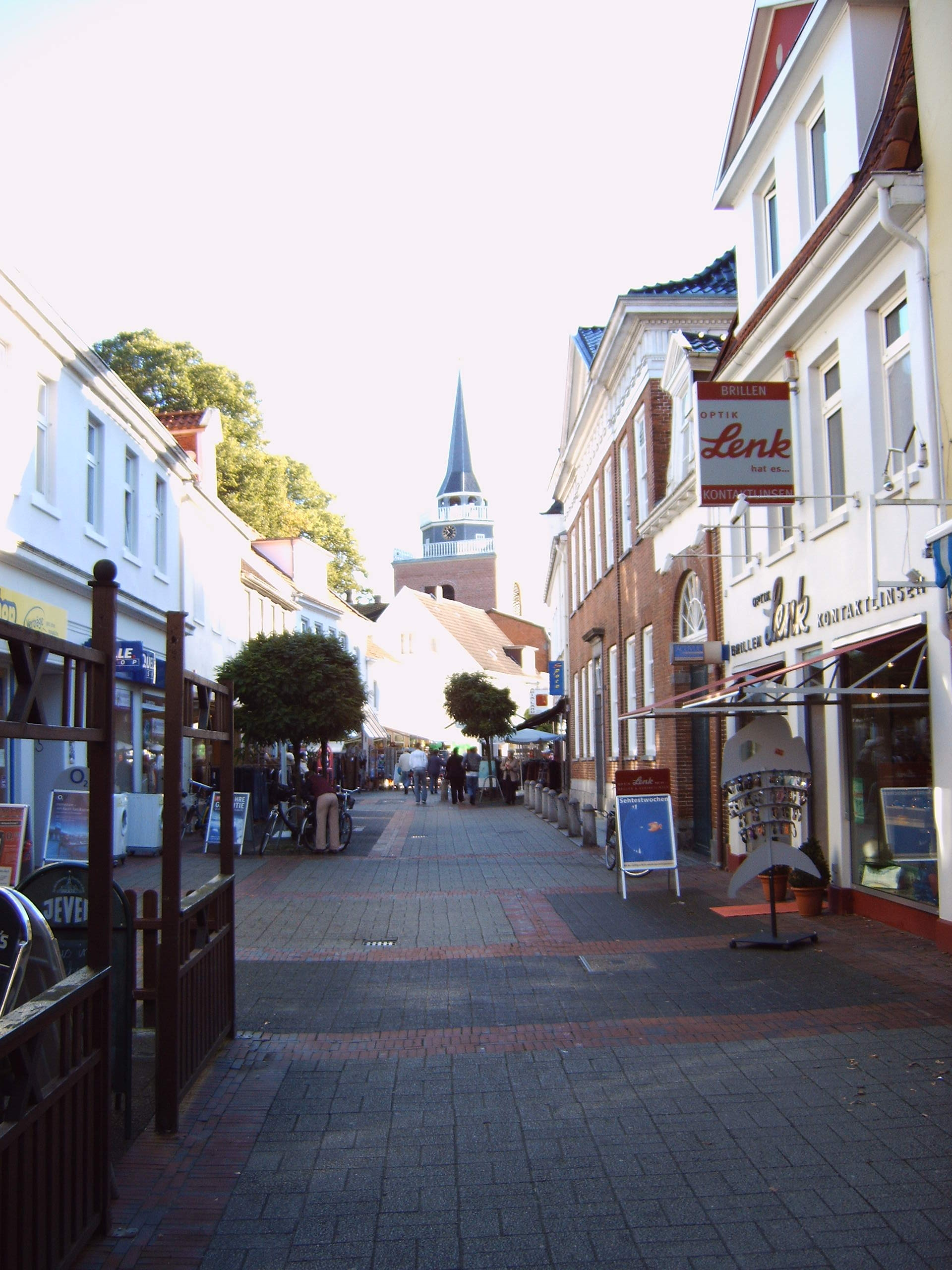
- Pedestrian zone in Aurich

- Flag Coat of arms

- Location of Aurich within Aurich district
- Interactive map of Aurich
- Location within Germany Location within Lower Saxony
- Coordinates: 53°28′17″N 07°29′01″E
- Country: Germany
- State: Lower Saxony
- District: Aurich

Government
  - Mayor (2019–24): Horst Feddermann (Ind.)

Area
  - Total: 197.29 km^{2} (76.17 sq mi)
- Elevation: 4 m (13 ft)

Population (2025-12-31)
  - Total: 42,575
  - Density: 215.80/km^{2} (558.92/sq mi)
- Time zone: UTC+01:00 (CET)
  - Summer (DST): UTC+02:00 (CEST)
- Postal codes: 26603–26607
- Dialling codes: 04941
- Vehicle registration: AUR
- Website: www.aurich.de

Aurich (German pronunciation: [ˈaʊʁɪç]; East Frisian Low Saxon: Auerk; Saterland Frisian: Aurk [ˈau̯ɐk]) is a town in the East Frisian region of Lower Saxony, Germany. It is the capital of the district of Aurich and is the second largest City in East Frisia, both in population, after Emden, and in area, after Wittmund.

== History ==
Historical affiliations

County of East Frisia 1464–1744
Kingdom of Prussia 1744–1808
(Netherlands) Kingdom of Holland 1808–1810
First French Empire 1810–1813
Kingdom of Prussia 1813–1815
Kingdom of Hanover 1815–1866
Kingdom of Prussia 1866–1871
German Empire 1871–1918
Weimar Republic 1918–1933
Nazi Germany 1933–1945
Allied-occupied Germany 1945–1949
West Germany 1949–1990
Germany 1990–present

The history of Aurich dates to the 13th century, when the settlement of Aurechove was mentioned in a Frisian document called the Brokmerbrief in 1276. There are various hypotheses about the interpretation of the city name. It either refers to a person (Affo, East Frisian first name) and his property (Reich) or it refers to waterworks on the fertile, water-rich lowland of the Aa (or Ehe) river, upon which the city was built; medieval realizations were Aurichove, Aurike, Aurikehove, Auerk, Auryke, Auwerckhove, Auwerick, Auwerck, Auwreke, Awerck, Awreke, Awrik, Auwerich and Aurickeshove.

In 1517, Count Edzard from the House of Cirksena began rebuilding the town after an attack. In 1539, the land authorities were brought together in Aurich, making it the county capital and, later, East Frisia, remaining the seat of the land authorities when East Frisia was inherited by the Kingdom of Prussia in 1744. After the Prussian Army was defeated in the Battle of Jena in 1807, Aurich became part of the Kingdom of Holland in 1808. In 1810, the Kingdom of Holland was annexed by France and Aurich was made the capital of the department Ems-Oriental of the First French Empire. After Napoleon was defeated in 1814, it passed to the Kingdom of Hanover in 1815, and then was annexed by Prussia in 1866 and made part of the Province of Hanover.

From 21 October 1944, until 23 December 1944, a Nazi concentration camp was established in Aurich. The camp was a subcamp to the Neuengamme concentration camp.

After World War II, Aurich became part of the new state of Lower Saxony.

== Local council ==
The local council has 40 members The elections in September 2016 showed the following results

- SPD: 13 seats
- CDU: 11 seats
- AWG 4 seats
- Gemeinsam für Aurich (GfA), 4 seats
- Alliance 90/The Greens 3 seats
- The Left 2 seats
- Grün-Alternative Politik (GAP)(Green alternative politics) 2 seats
- FDP, 1 seat

== Coat of arms ==
Aurich's coat of arms is drawn by the blazon: "Arms: Landscape with chief two-thirds sky and base third earth, a shield Gules emblazoned with letter 'A' Or, an open-topped crown Or above, two growing trees Vert at sides. Crown: A battlement Gules with three merlons and two embrasures. Supporters: Two branches of mistletoe with leaves and berries Or.".

The coat of arms of the district with the same name is different.

== Transport ==
Aurich train station

Aurich is located on the Abelitz - Aurich railway although there currently is no regular passenger transport. Aurich is connected to the local bus network and located in the area of the transport association Verkehrsverbund Ems-Jade (VEJ).

== Twin towns – sister cities ==
Aurich is twinned with:

- Appingedam, Netherlands

== Notable people ==
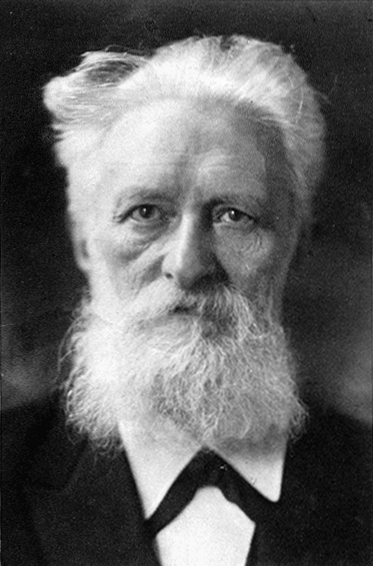
Rudolf Eucken

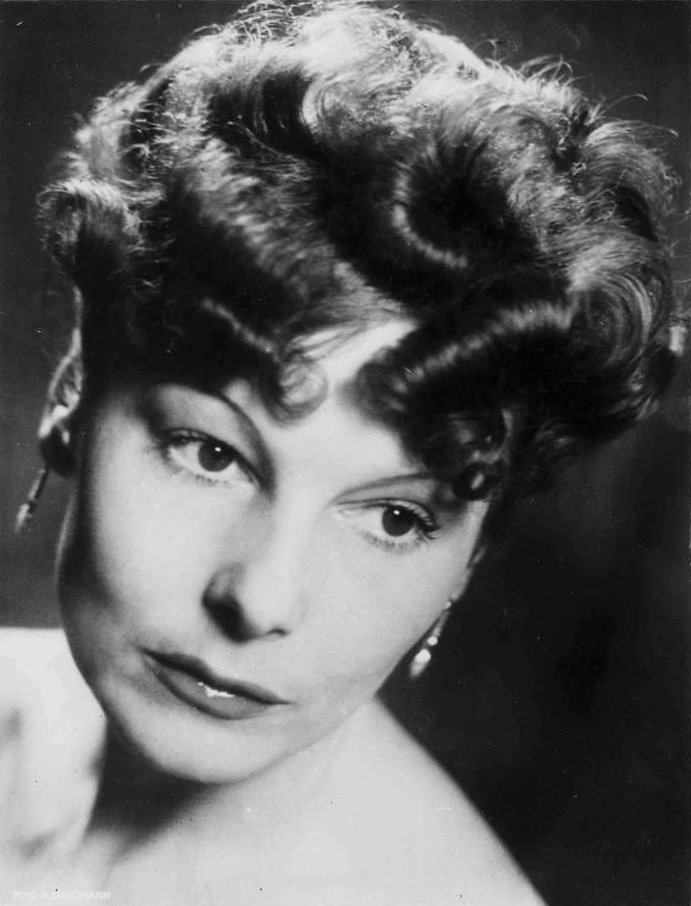
Ellen Frank, 1938

- Johan II of East Frisia (1538–1591), co-regent of the County of East Frisia.
- Enno III, Count of East Frisia (1563–1625), Count of Ostfriesland from 1599 to 1625
- Liefmann Calmer (1711–1784), important personage in French Jewry of the eighteenth century
- Johan Heinrich Becker (1715–1761), physician and chemist who settled in Norway.
- Friedrich August Peter von Colomb (1775–1854), Prussian general
- Rudolf von Jhering (1818–1892), jurist.
- Friedrich Theodor von Frerichs (1819–1885), a pathologist
- Karl Heinrich Ulrichs (1825–1895), lawyer, jurist, journalist, and writer
- Hin Bredendieck (1904–1995), designer
- Ellen Frank (1904–1999), a film and TV actress.
- Laura Hillman (1923–2020), American writer and memoirist, and Holocaust survivor
- Rudolf Eucken (1846–1926), philosopher, winner of the 1908 Nobel Prize for Literature.
- Georg von Eucken-Addenhausen (1855–1942), jurist, politician and mayor of Jena.
- Luise Dornemann (1901–1992), a women's rights activist-politician and later, a writer.
- Karl Deichgräber (1903–1984), classical philologist
- Yitzhak Raveh (1906–1989), Israeli judge
- Aloys Wobben (1952–2021), engineer
- Jan-Christian Dreesen (born 1967), chief financial officer of FC Bayern.
- Uwe Rosenberg (born 1970), board game designer
- Stefan Lampadius (born 1976), actor and filmmaker.
- Wiard Siebels (born 1978), German politician
- Frank Löning (born 1981), footballer who played 418 games
- Paul Ronzheimer (born 1985), journalist and war correspondent

== See also ==
- List of subcamps of Neuengamme
