= Enercon =

Wind turbine manufacturer in Aurich, Germany

Enercon GmbH
- Type: Private
- Industry: Wind power industry
- Founded: 1984; 42 years ago
- Founder: Aloys Wobben
- Headquarters: Aurich, Germany
- Key people: Udo Bauer
- Products: Wind turbines
- Owner: Aloys Wobben Foundation
- Number of employees: ~18,000
- Website: www.enercon.de

Enercon GmbH is a wind turbine manufacturer based in Aurich, Lower Saxony, Germany. It has been the market leader in Germany since the mid-1990s. Enercon has production facilities in Germany (Aurich, Emden and Magdeburg), Brazil, India, Canada, Turkey and Portugal. In June 2010, Enercon announced that they would be setting up Irish headquarters in Tralee.

The Aloys-Wobben-foundation of founder Aloys Wobben owns the UEE Holding, which owns the Enercon GmbH. Aloys Wobben, Simon Wobben and Hans-Dieter Kettwich control the company.

As of December 2017, Enercon had installed more than 26,300 wind turbines, with a power generating capacity exceeding 43 GW. The most-often installed model is the E-40, which pioneered the gearbox-less design in 1993. As of July 2011, Enercon has a market share of 7.2% worldwide (fifth-highest) and 59.2% in Germany.

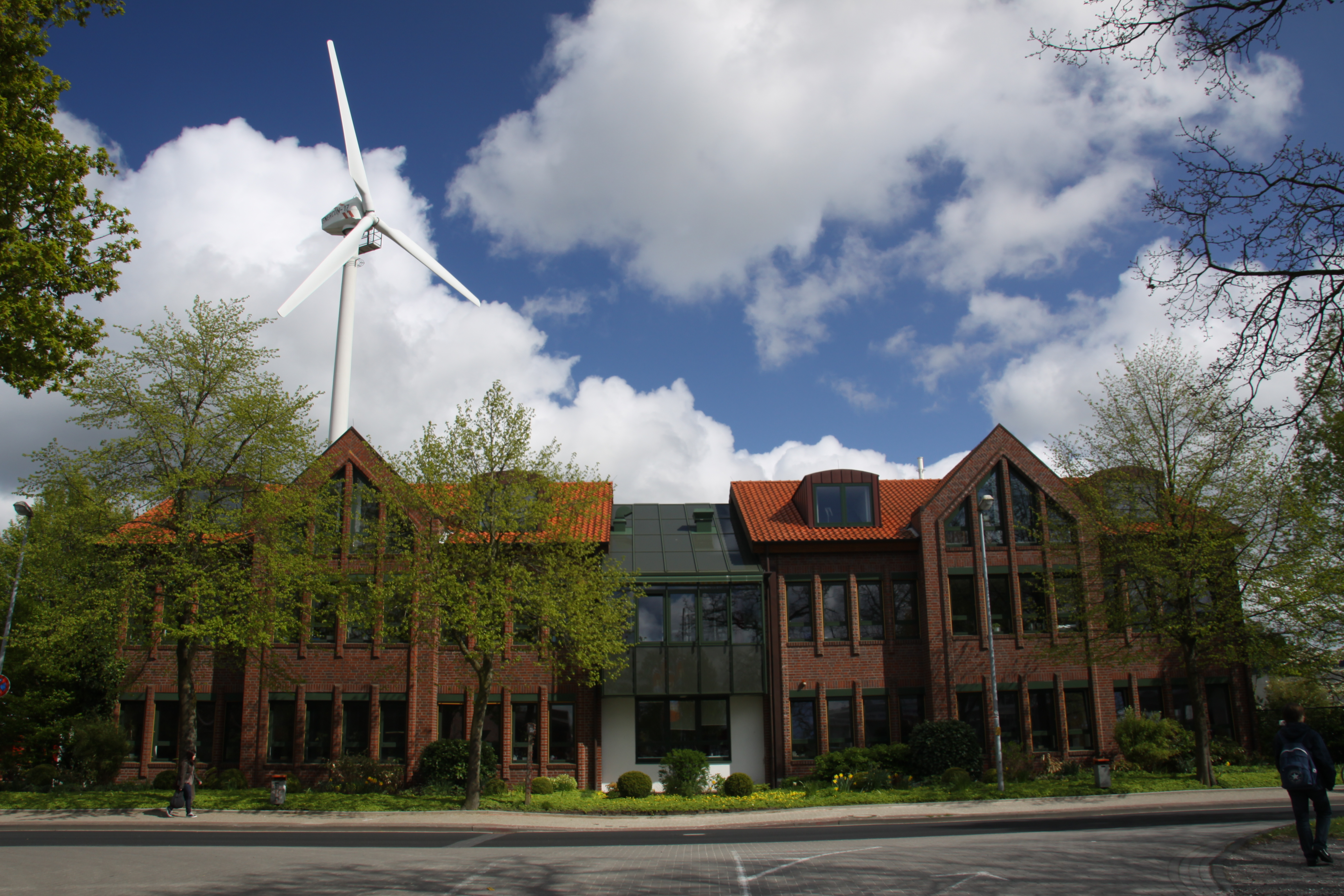
Enercon Headquarters in Aurich

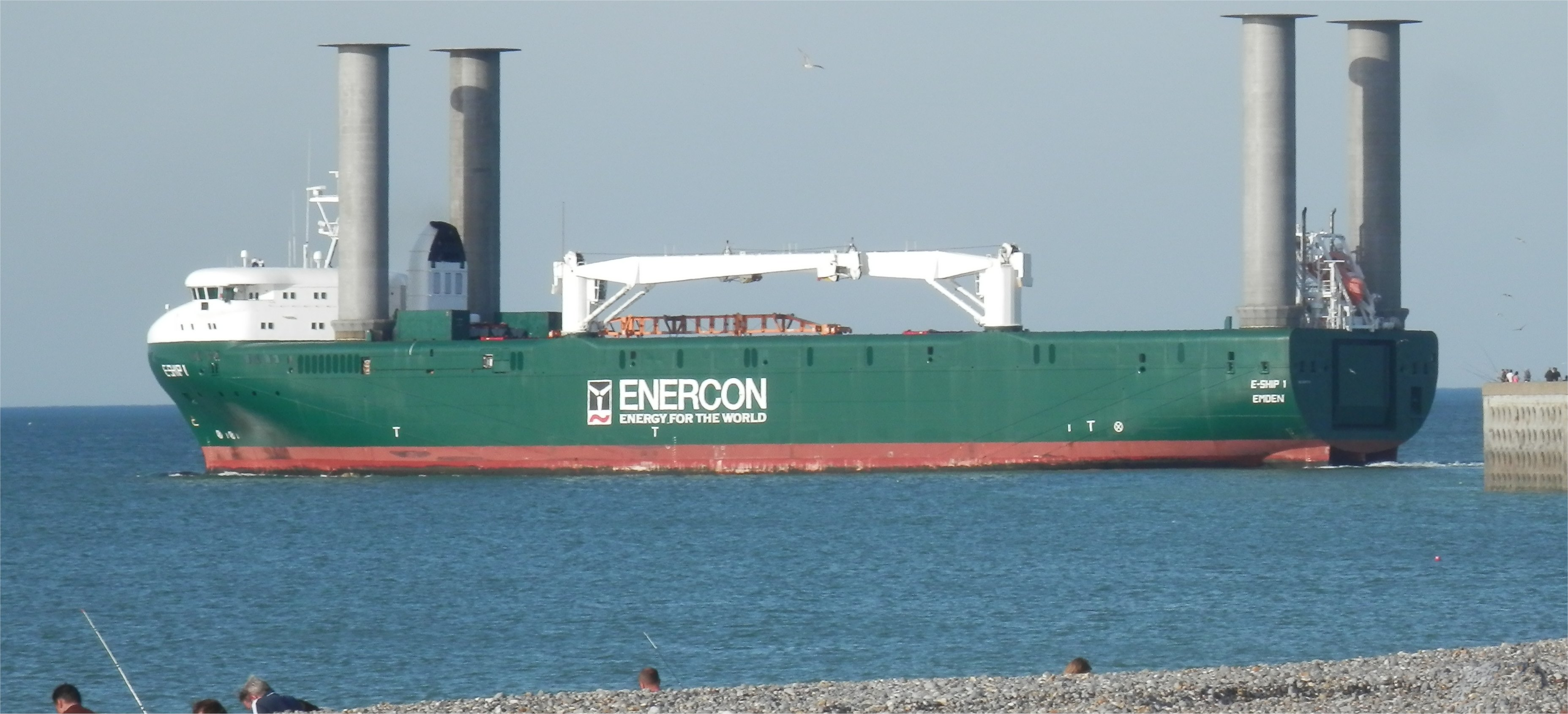
E-Ship 1 leaving Dieppe

== Company structure ==
Aloys Wobben founded the Aloys-Wobbe-Stiftung. The foundation owns the UEE Holding, which Enercon belongs to.

Over 30 supply companies exclusively work for Enercon. In 2018 some of them, including WEC Turmbau Emden, WEC Turmbau Magdeburg and Aero Ems GmbH, announced that they would fire a total of 800 employees. Enercon declared that these companies would be completely independent.

In fact, the companies belong to the Grp Aloys B A Wobben Breeze Trust based in Luxembourg and the British Virgin Islands through nested ownership structures. At the time, the NDR assumed that the structure was set up so that Aloys Wobben could skim off his profits but not have to make any social obligations to his employees.

== History ==
In 1984, Wobben founded a wind turbine manufacturer called Enercon in Aurich by developing and producing wind turbines with three employees. In 1993, Wobben switched production to the gearless wind turbine with a full converter, a technology that he had developed. The Enercon E-40 turbine met expectations and was gained worldwide success.

Wobben withdrew from the operational business in 2012 and transferred his company shares to the Aloys-Wobben Foundation with effect from 1 October 2012. Since 2016 his nephew Simon Wobben is part of the managing team.

On 24 February 2022, the day of the Russian full scale invasion of Ukraine, the remote maintenance units of 5,800 Enercon wind turbines were affected by a suspected Russian cyber-attack on the satellite system operator Viasat and had to be replaced.

According to Forbes, Aloys Wobben had a net worth of $7.1 billion as of August 2021.

== Technologies ==
Enercon wind turbines have some special technical features compared to turbines of most other manufacturers. One is the gearless propulsion concept, which Enercon pioneered since 1993. The first generation of gearless turbines was the E-40/500 kW series. (Earlier Enercon designs had a transmission train.) The hub with the rotor blades connects directly to the rotor of the ring generator (direct drive). The rotor unit rotates on a front and rear main bearing about a fixed axis. The speed of the rotor is transmitted directly to the high-pole synchronous generator, where the rotor rotates in the stator, differently. The Enercon generator has no permanent magnets, allowing the company to not rely on rare-earth metals. However, the direct connection also causes grid losses. Rotation speed and the mechanical load changes over the service life are lower than geared systems. Rotation speed varies from 18 to 45 revolutions per minute (RPM) for the E-33 and 5-11.7 RPM for the E-126 depending on wind speed, while a geared generator has a speed of about 1500 RPM at rated power. Thus the large Enercon generators lead to high tower head masses, and construction and logistical challenges. In 2022, the first integrated box-shaped nacelles with inverter and transformer reduced logistics - all previous Enercon turbines had power systems in the tower base.

Most Enercon systems are visually distinct from systems of other manufacturers. Their nacelles have been drop-shaped since 1995/1996. This unique design was developed by British architect Norman Foster, who also designed the dome of the Berlin Reichstag. In Germany and many other countries, the tower has coloured green rings above the foundation, which get brighter from bottom to top. On islands such as Borkum, the gradation is blue. The NCS grading is intended to better integrate the plant towers into the horizon. The rotor blades were the only ones on the market with blade tips similar to the winglets on aircraft.

In 2008, the first E-126 turbines (successor of the E-112) were installed at sites throughout Germany and Belgium, including the Estinnes wind farm (consisting of eleven E-126 turbines) in Belgium. Although the E-126 turbine was initially developed with a power rating of 6 MW, it has since been upgraded to 7.5 MW. The E-82 turbine was also upgraded and is available in 2, 2.3, and 3 MW versions.

Currently Enercon does not offer or supply wind turbines to offshore projects and has at times expressed skepticism about offshore wind parks. Enercon was rumored to have been ready to supply turbines to Germany's Alpha Ventus offshore wind farm and to a near-shore park near Wilhelmshaven but did not do so.

== Turbines ==
Note: wind turbine designations with a "*" mean the turbine is either temporarily unavailable, or has been taken off sale permanently.

Model number	Rated power output (based on variant)	Variants	Rotor diameter (meters)	Hub height (meters)	Notes	Source(s)	Number installed
E-10/E-12*	30 kW	0.3.10, 0.3.12	10		Developed in 2007, but unknown whether it is still being produced		3
E-15/16*	55 kW	0.55.15, 0.55.16	15/16		Developed 1984, no longer available		46
E-17/E-18*	80 kW	0.8.17, 0.8.18	17/18		Developed and installed 1988, no longer available		158
E-30*	300-330 kW	3.30	30, 33	50	Gearless direct-drive, discontinued due to "low demand"		660, 576 (original), 84 (revised)
E-32/33*	100-300 kW	1.32, 3.32, 1.33, 3.33	32, 33.4	34, 35, 41, 47	Geared turbines, replaced by E-30 DD model 1st generation E-33		?
E-40	500 kW, 600 kW	5.40, 6.44	40, 44.5		First gearless drive, no longer available		5879 total (1887 original, 3992 revised)
E-44	900 kW	9.44	45	45, 55			563
E-48	800 kW	8.48	48	50, 55, 56, 60, 65, 76			1878
E-53	800 kW	8.53	52.9	60, 73	Prototype developed 2006		1240
E-58*	1 MW	10.58	58		Prototype installed in 1998 - replaced by E-48, henceforth no longer available		225
E-66*	1.5 MW, 1.8 MW, 2.0 MW	15.66, 15.70, 18.66, 18.70, 20.70	66 & 70		Prototype developed 1995, no longer available - replaced by E-70, E-82 and E-92		2486
E-70	2.0 MW, 2.3	20.71, 23.71	71	57, 58, 64, 70, 74.5, 84, 98, 113	Direct drive		4360
E-82	2 MW, 2.3 MW, 3MW	20.82, 23.82, 30.82	82	78, 84, 98, 108	Direct drive		3146
E-92	2.35 MW	24.92	92	84, 98, 108, 138	Direct drive		~250
E-101	3 MW	101		99, 124, 135, 149	Direct drive Prototype installed June 2011		~1500
E-103 EP2	2.35 MW	24.103 (EP2)	103	98 or 138	Direct drive - two prototypes installed in France in 2017		2
E-112*	4.5 MW, 6 MW	60.114, 45.114	112 & 114	108, 124	Replaced by E-126, no longer available		9
E-115	2.5 MW, 3.0 MW	25.115, 30.115	115	92.5-149	Direct drive		?
E-126	6.0 MW, 7.58 MW	60.126, 76.126	126	135	Prototype developed October 2007		95 as of autumn 2016
E-126 EP3	3.5 MW, 4.0	35.126 EP3, 40.126 EP3	126	86, 116, or 135	Based on a different platform to other Enercon turbines		1 near Kirch Muslow
E-136 EP5	4.65MW	47.136 (EP5)	136	109, 120, 132	Based on Lagerwey's turbine platform		13 installed in Eemshaven port in the Netherlands
E-138 EP3	3.5MW, 4.0MW 4.2MW	35.138 (EP3), 40.138 (EP3)	138	81, 111, 131, or 160	Based on a different platform to other Enercon turbines		300+ (estimated)
E-126 EP4 4.2MW	4.2 MW	42.126 (EP4)	126	135	Designed for low-wind sites		
E-141 EP4 4.2MW	4.2 MW	42.141 (EP4)	141	129 or 159	Prototype installed, Number unknown		TBA
E-147 EP5	5MW	50.147 (EP5)	147	126, 132, 143, 155	Based on Lagerwey's turbine platform		2
E-160 EP5	4.6MW	46.160	160	120, 166	Based on Lagerwey's platform		2 (3 more to be built in Germany)

== Issues ==
=== Patent dispute ===
Enercon was prohibited from exporting their wind turbines to the US until 2010 due to alleged infringement of U.S. patent 5,083,039. In a dispute before the United States International Trade Commission, Enercon did not challenge the validity of the US patent but argued that their technology was not affected. The ITC decided that the patent covered the technology in question and banned Enercon turbines from the US market until 2010. Later, a cross patent agreement was made with the competitor General Electric, the successor of Kenetech, after similar claims of Enercon against GE. According to a NSA employee detailed information concerning Enercon was passed on to Kenetech via ECHELON. The aim of the alleged industrial espionage against Enercon was the forwarding of details of Wobben's generator technology to a US firm.

== Other ventures ==
From 2008 to 2020, Enercon was part owner of a railway company, which among other things owns the Abelitz–Aurich railway, (via de:Eisenbahninfrastrukturgesellschaft Aurich-Emden) which is used to deliver wind turbine blades made by Enercon via rail to customers. During the time Enercon part-owned the rail line, the company undertook large scale investments in its infrastructure. In 2020 Enercon sold its rail ventures To Hermann Bettels GmbH.

== Gallery ==
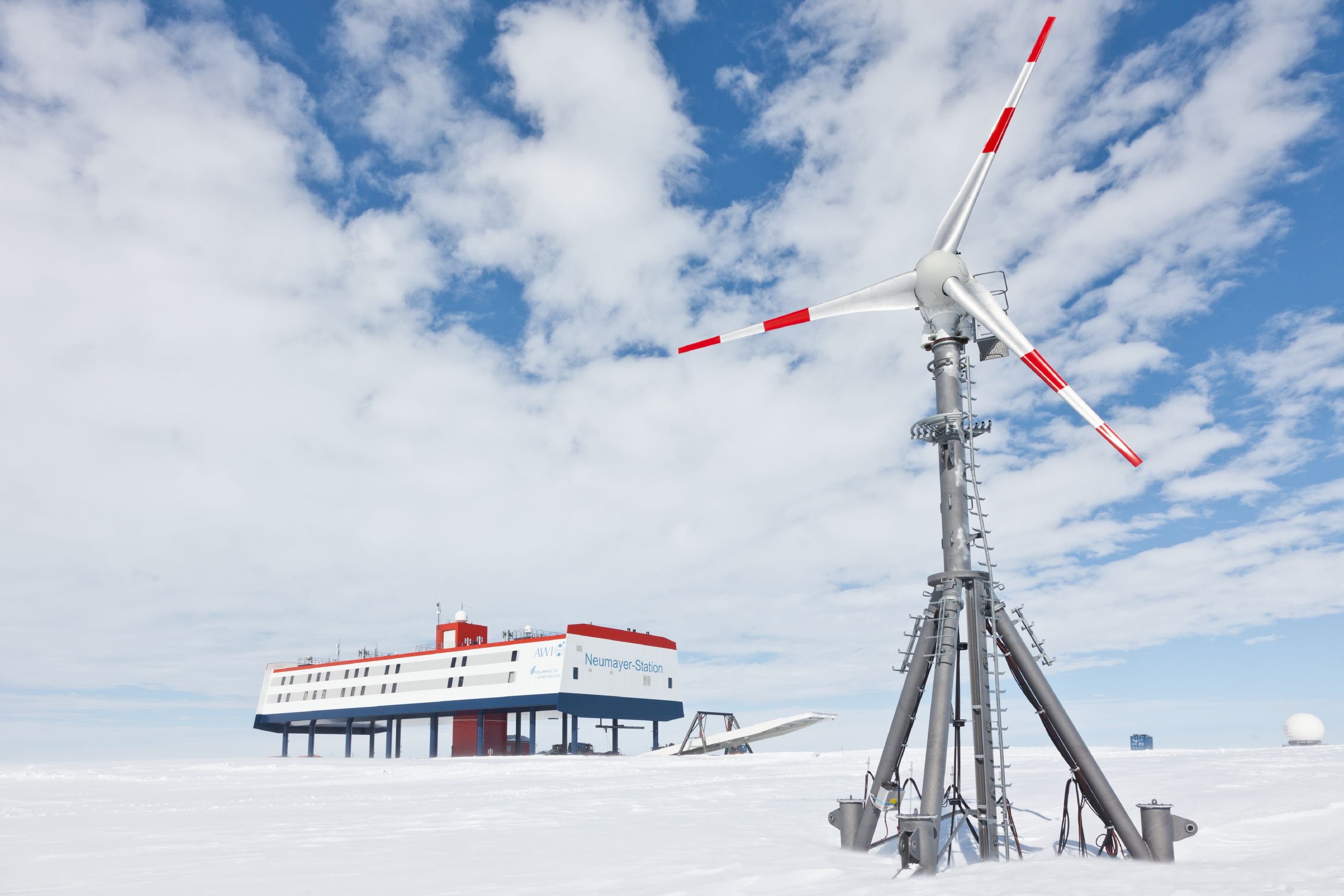
E-10 at Neumayer Station III

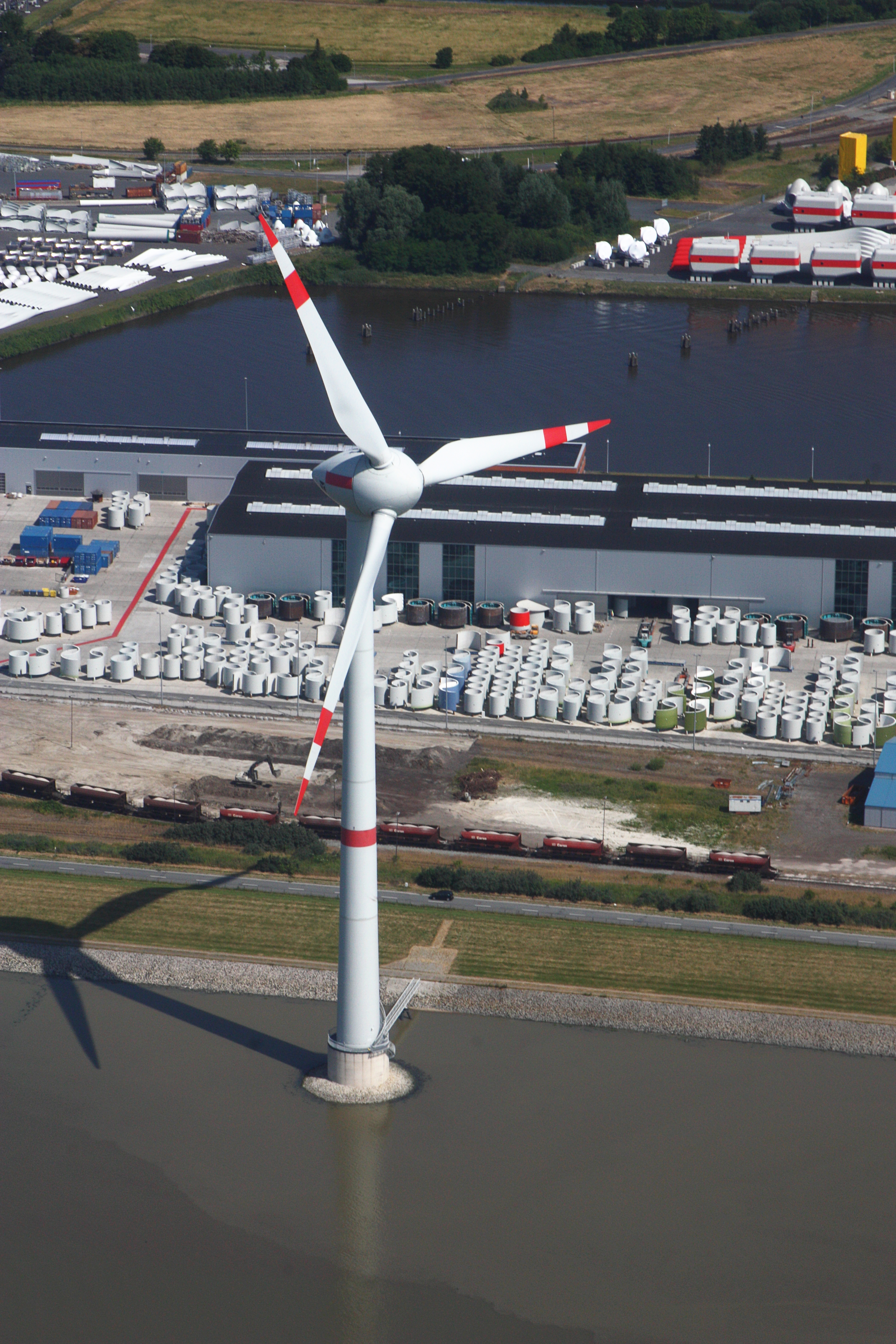
E-112 at Ems Emden, Enercon's only offshore wind turbine installed to date

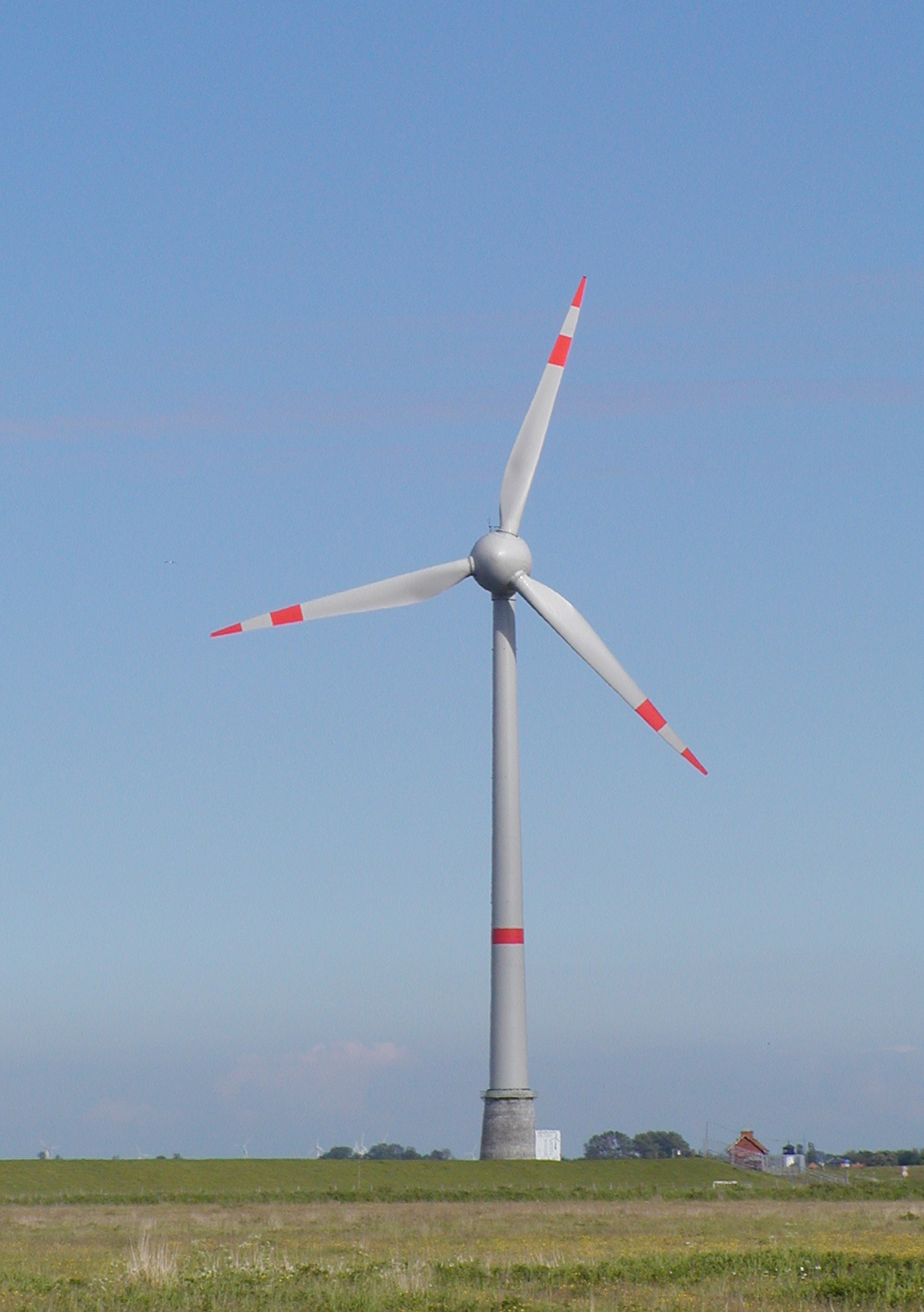
Second E-112 at Cuxhaven

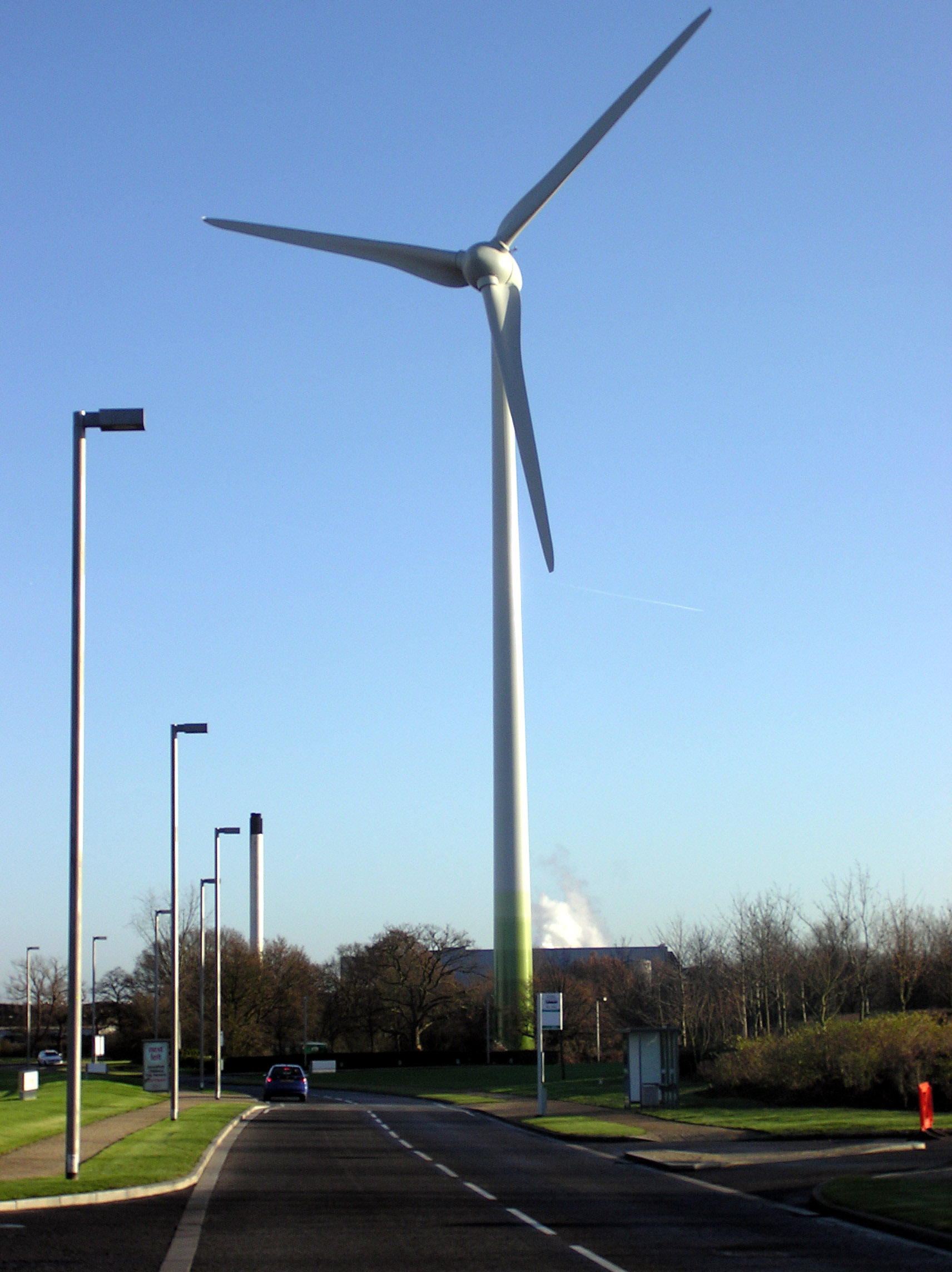
E-70 at Green Park Business Park

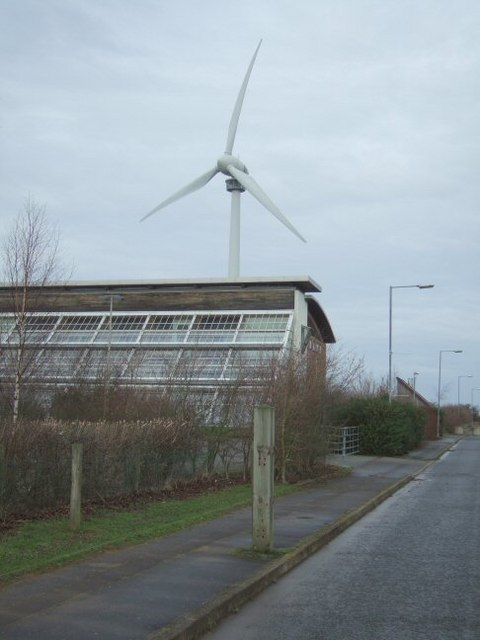
E-66 at Swaffham's Ecotech centre, with observation deck below the nacelle

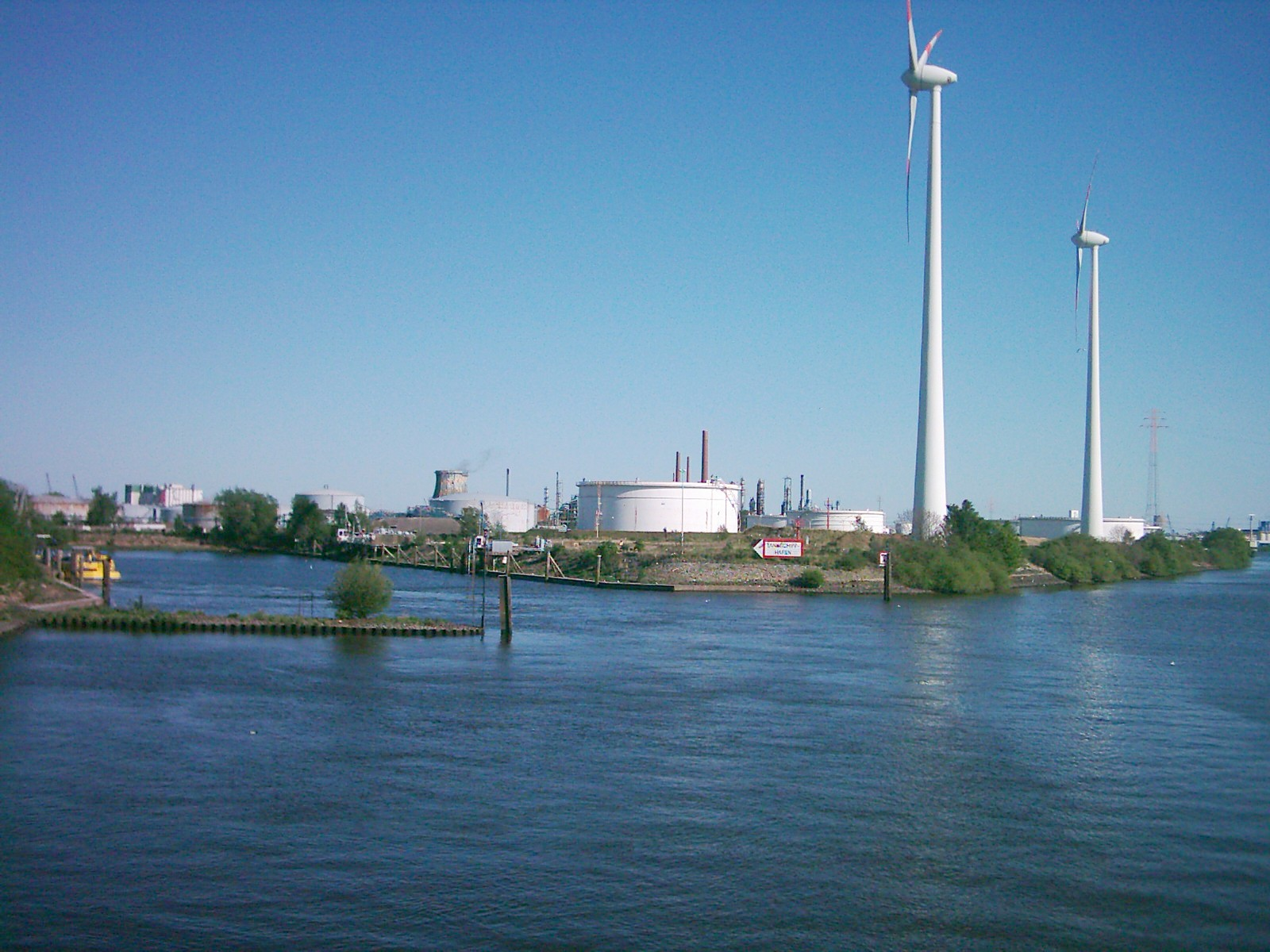
Brown meets green: Enercon wind turbines at oil refinery

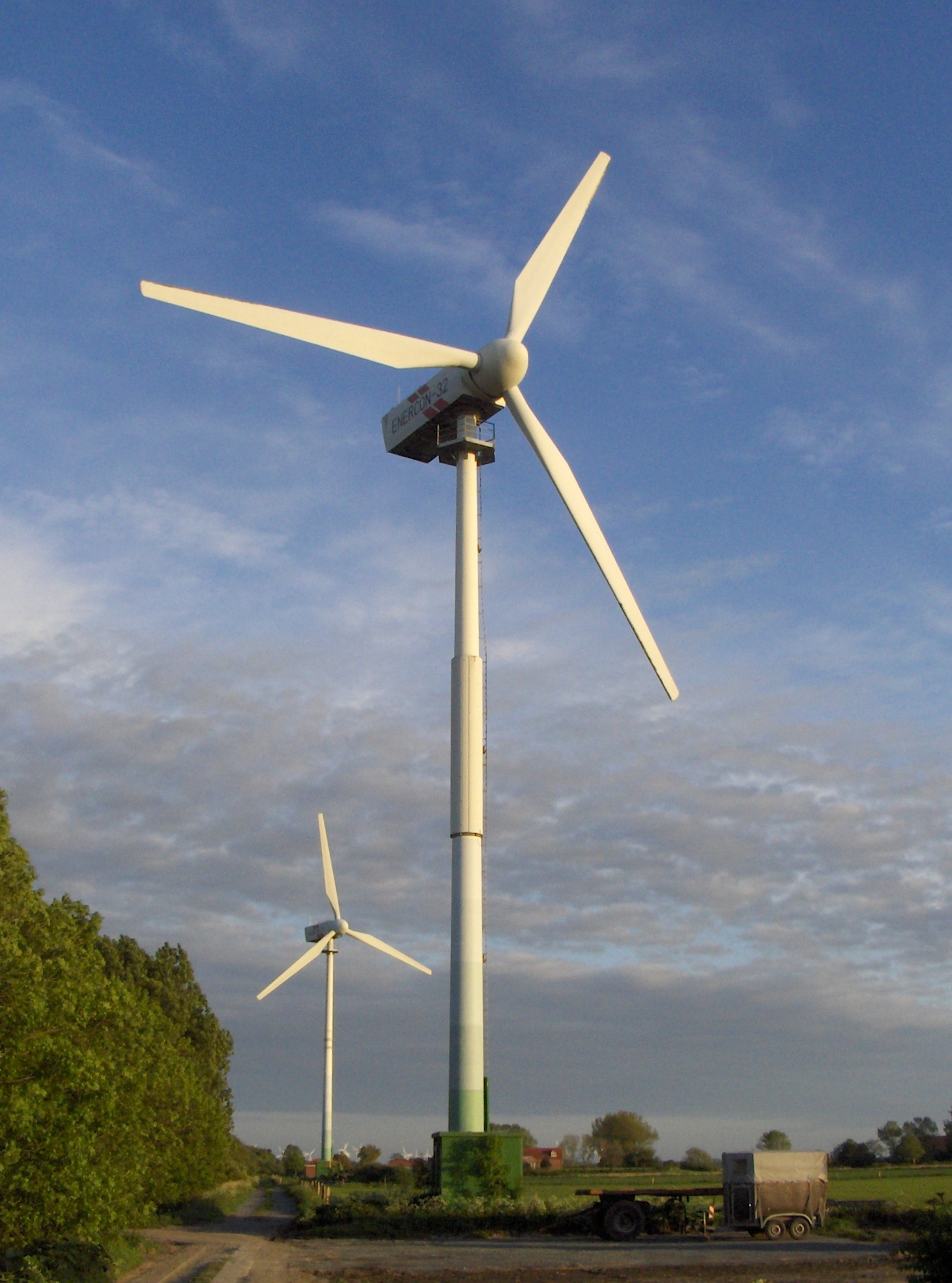
E-32 on the North Sea coast

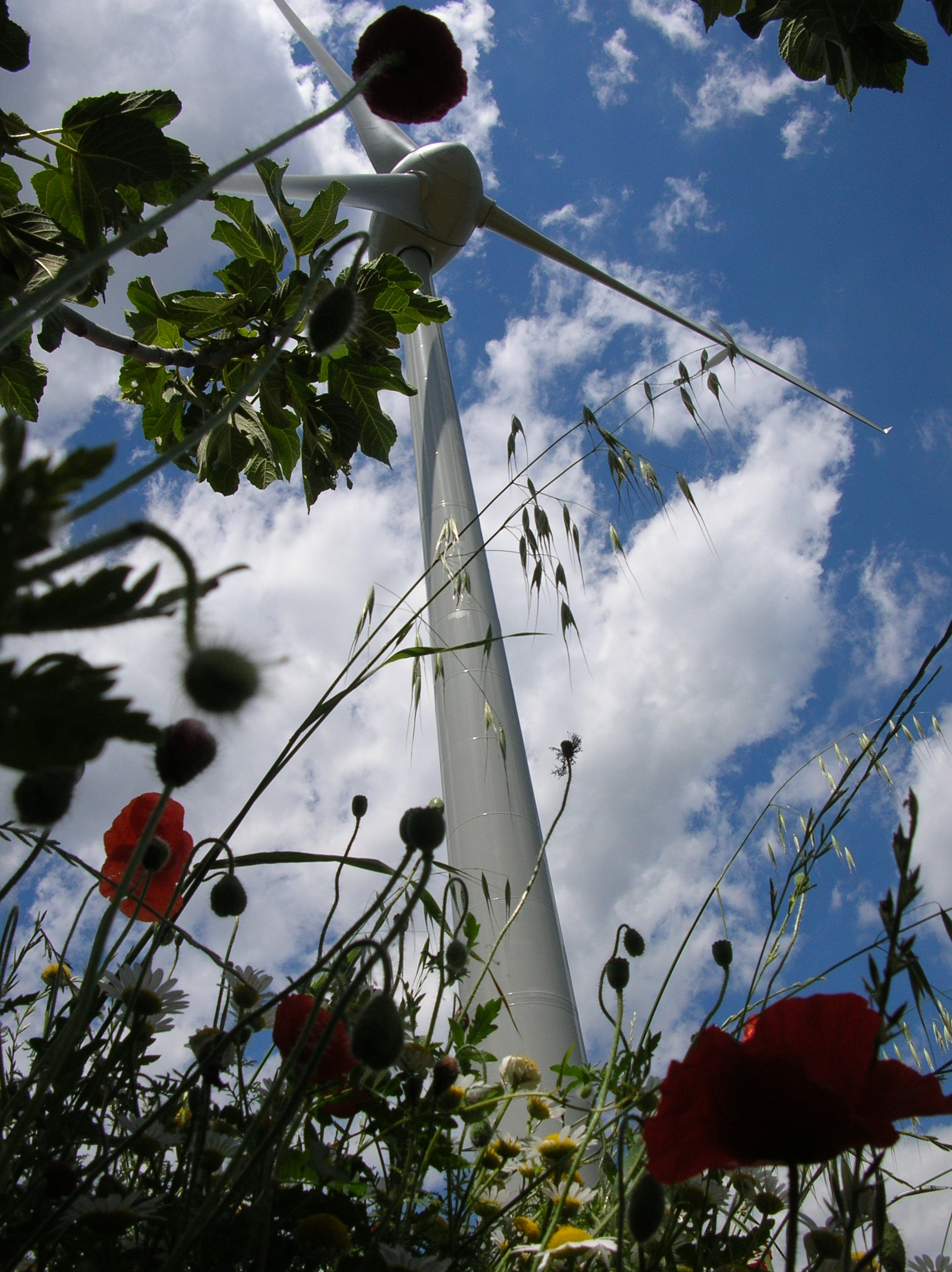
Enercon E-48 in the Wind Farm near the Medieval village of Tocco da Casauria in Italy

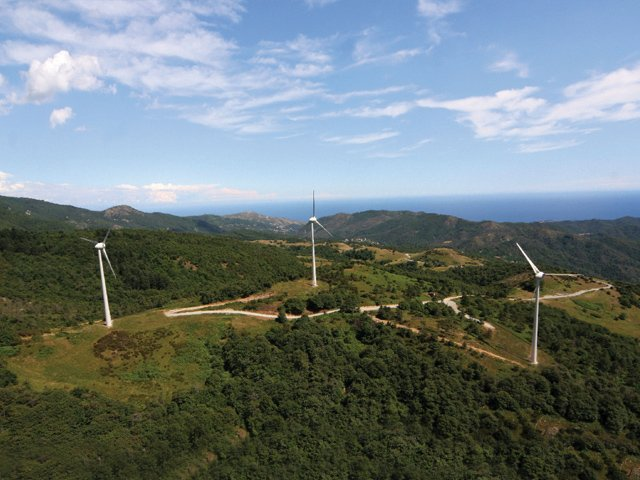
Wind farm with 3 Enercon E-48 in Stella, Liguria, Italy

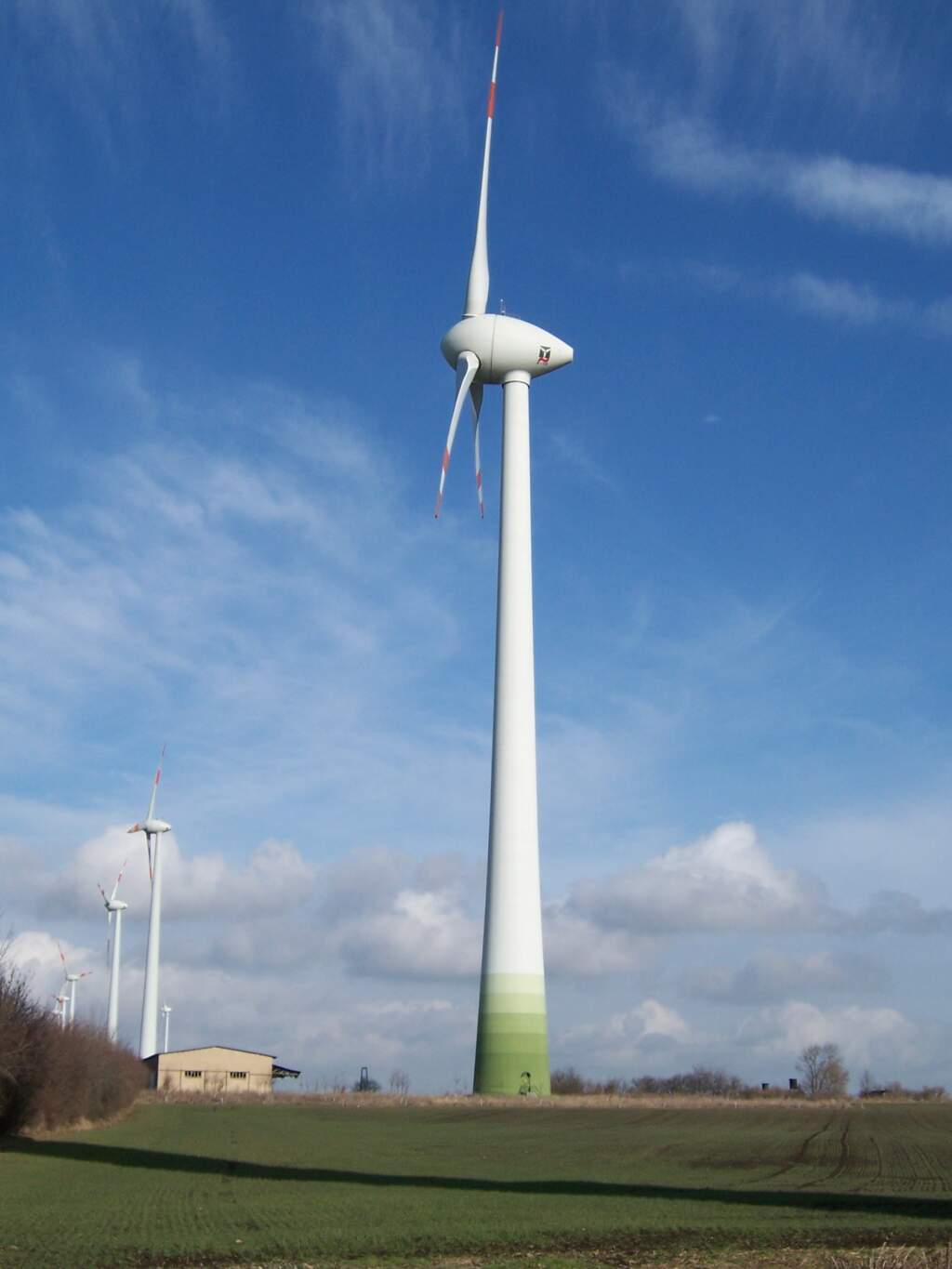
Enercon E-112

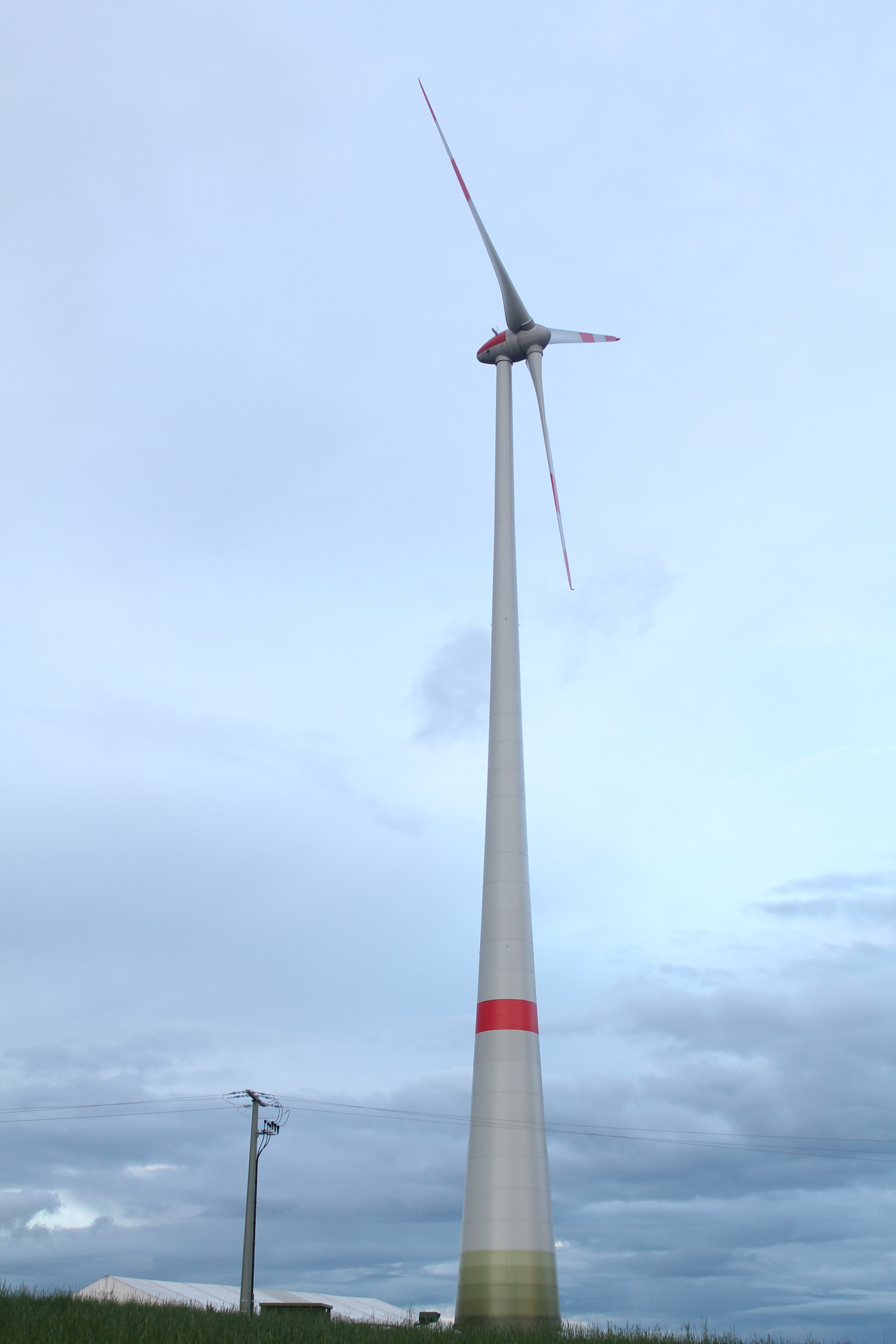
Enercon E-82

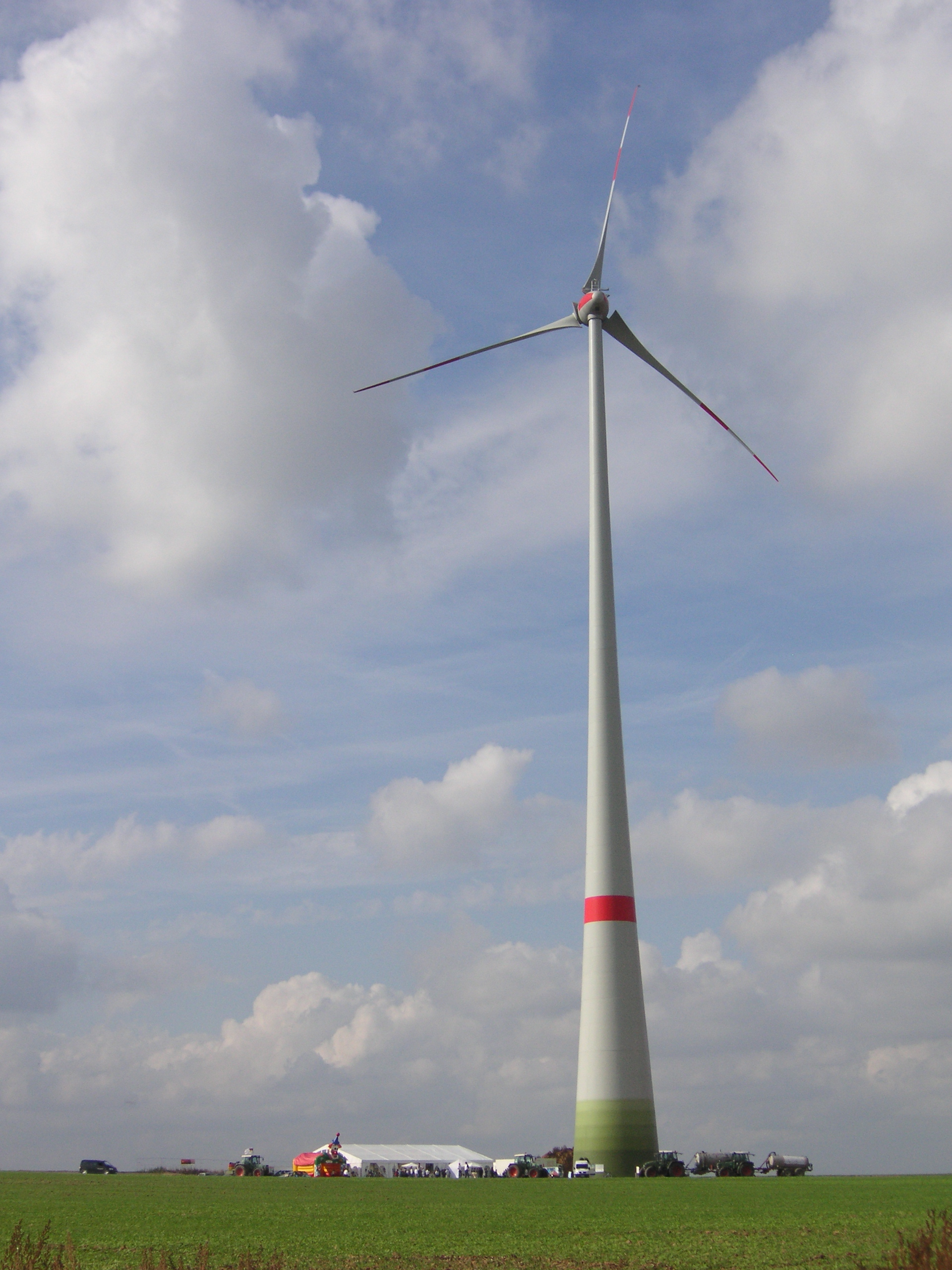
Enercon E-82

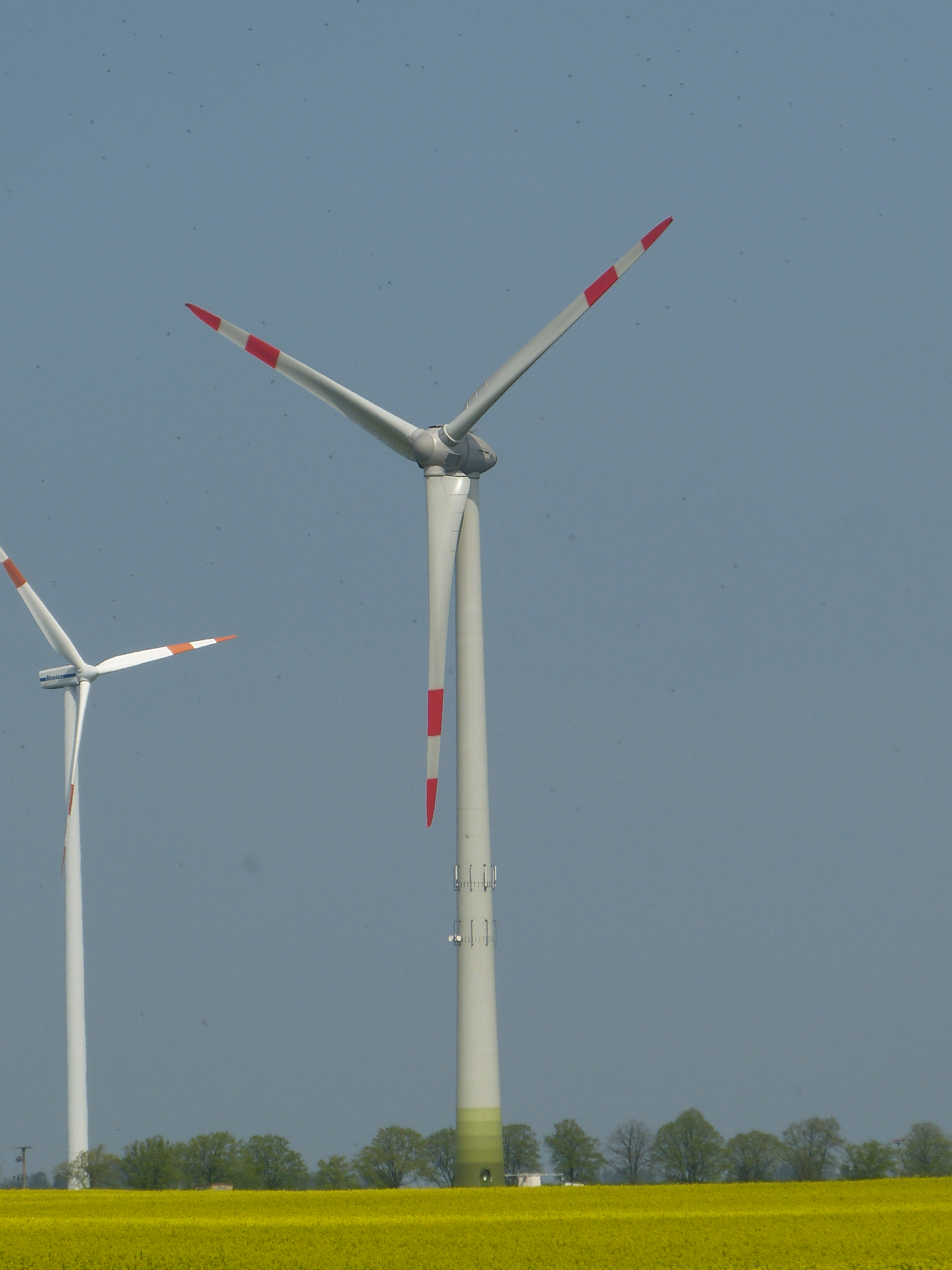
Enercon E-101

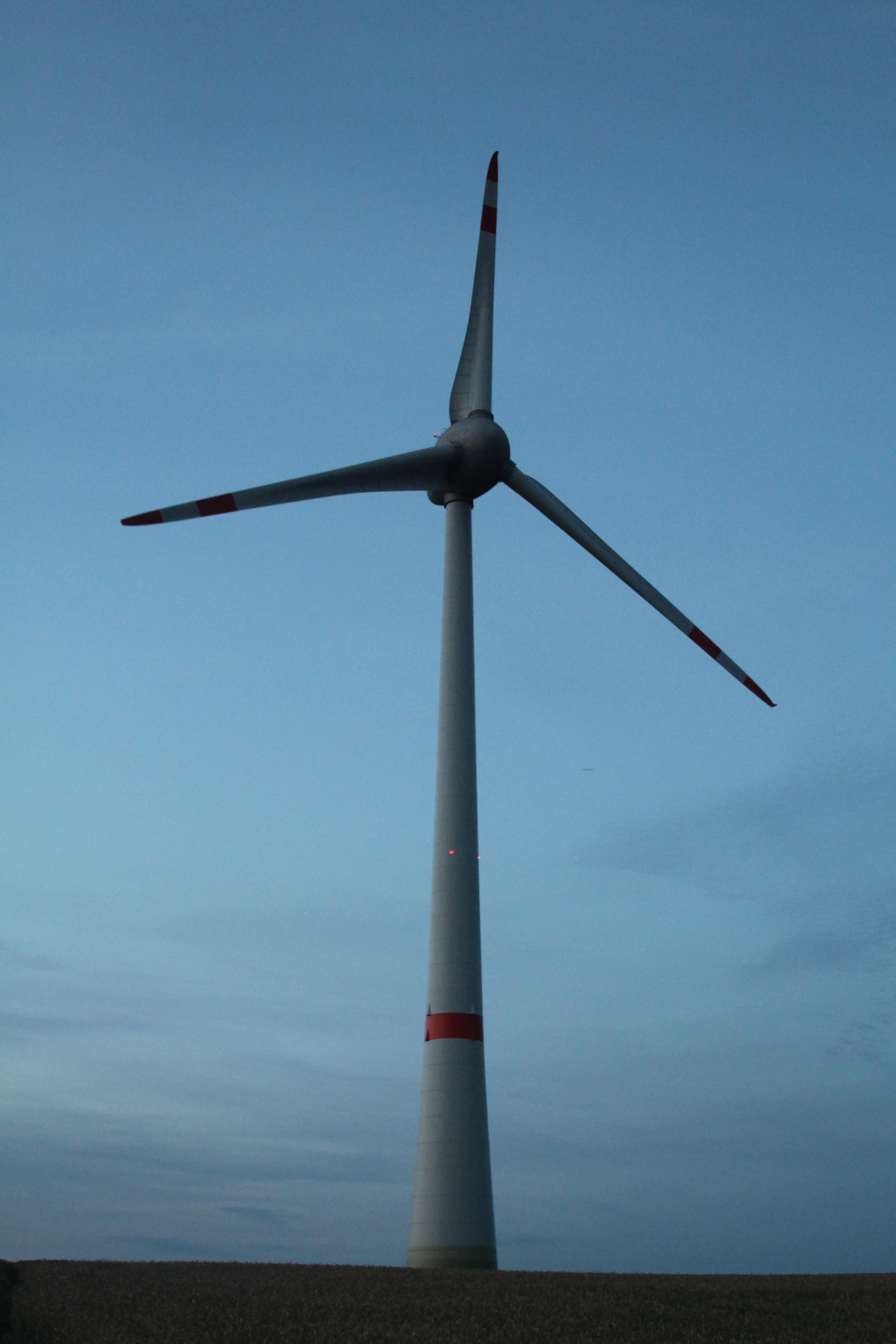
Enercon E-126

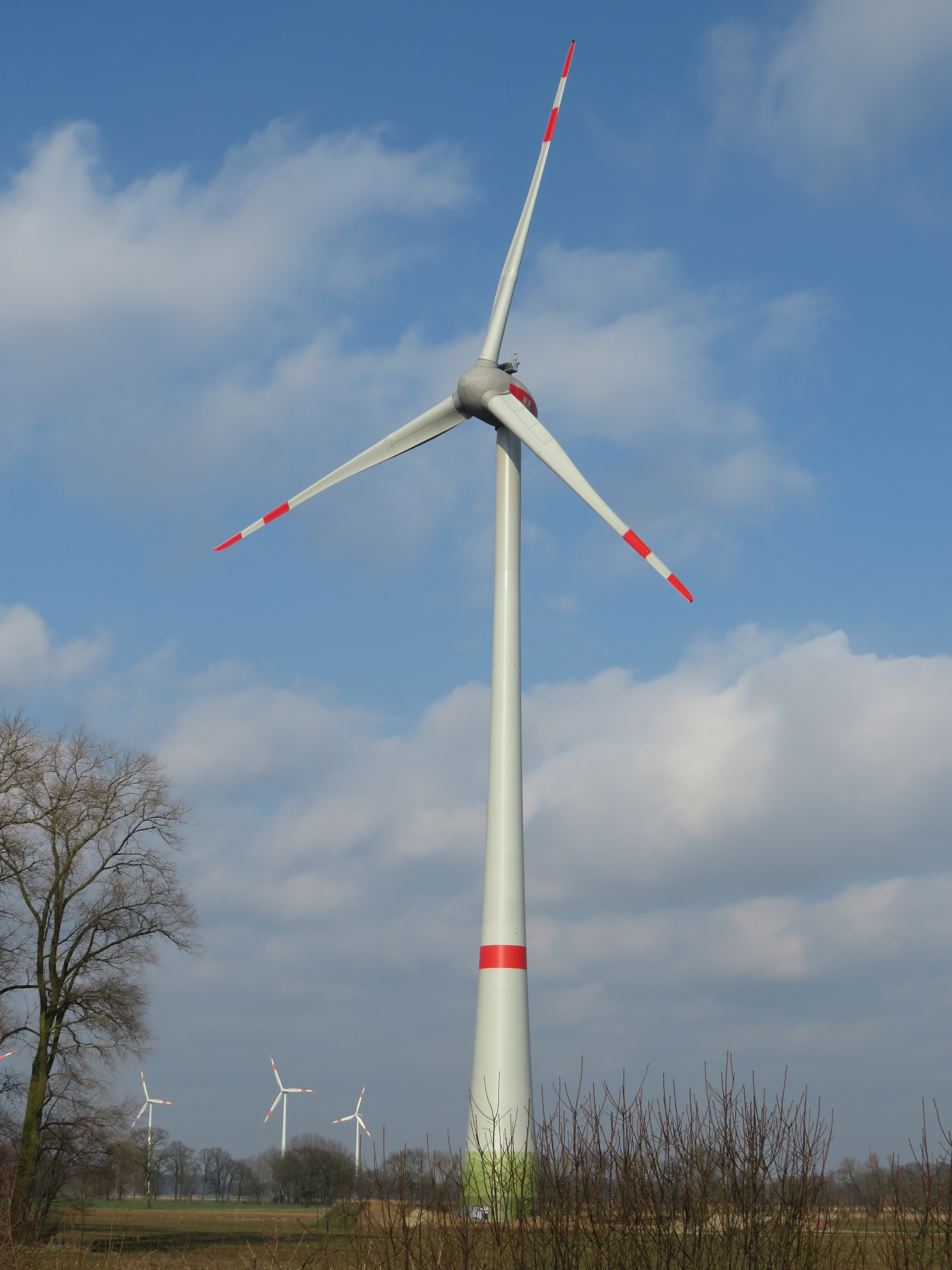
A weaker Enercon E-126 - EP4 low-wind model - at Holdorf

=== Estinnes windfarm ===
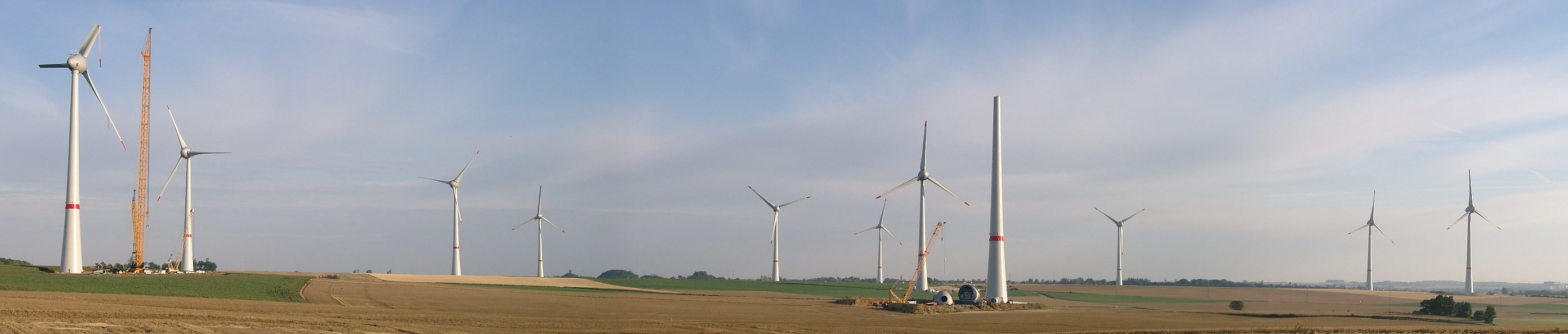
The 11 turbine Estinnes Wind Farm in July 2011 before completion...
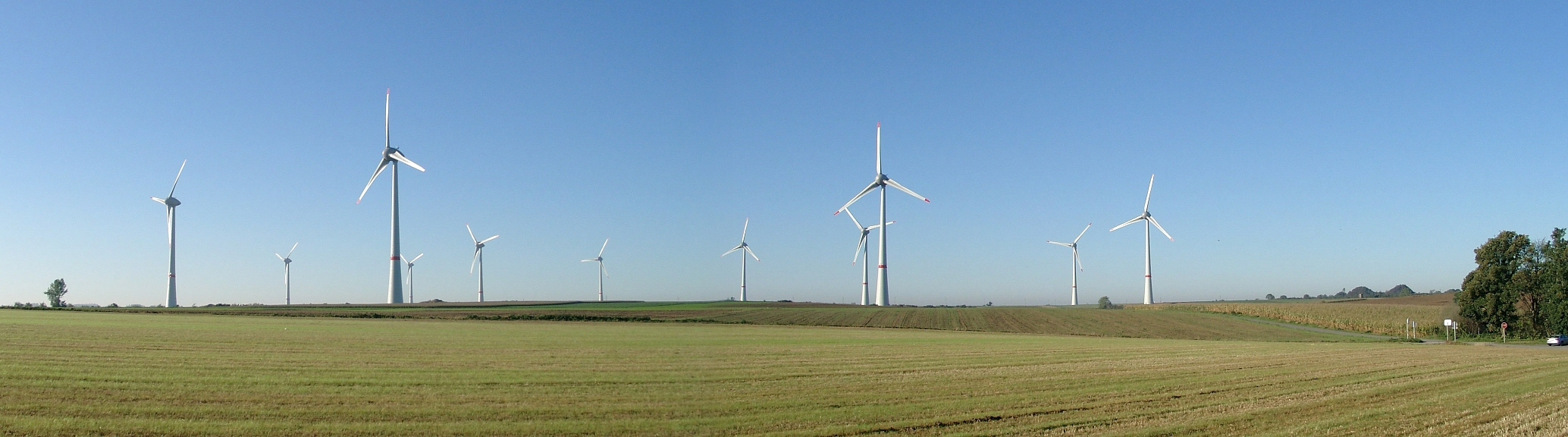
...and in October of 2011, two months right after completion. With each turbine producing 7.58MW, the total energy output of Estinnes Windpark is 83.4MW.

== See also ==
- List of wind turbine manufacturers
- Renewable energy industry
- Wind power
- Enercon E-126
- Lawrence Weston Wind Turbine
