= Rebreather diving =

Underwater diving using self contained breathing gas recycling apparatus

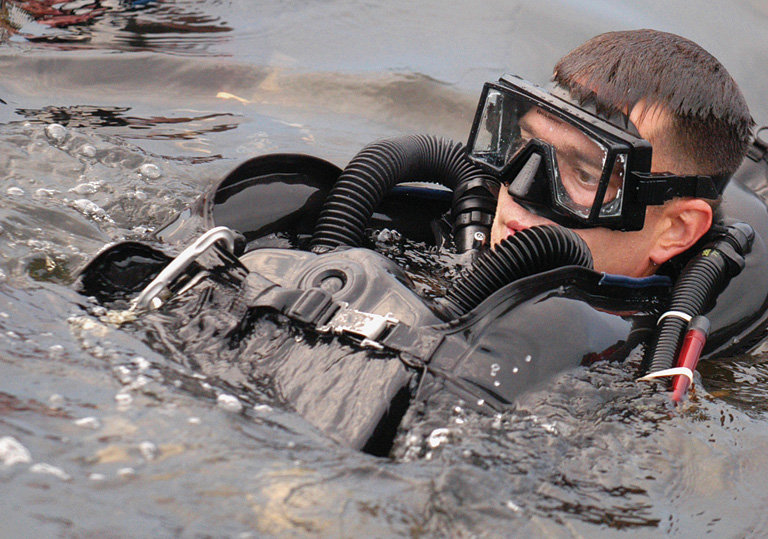
2nd Reconnaissance Battalion combat diver training with the Dräger LAR V rebreather

Rebreather diving is underwater diving using diving rebreathers, a class of underwater breathing apparatus which recirculates the breathing gas exhaled by the diver after replacing the oxygen used and removing the carbon dioxide metabolic product. Rebreather diving is practiced by recreational, military and scientific divers in applications where it has advantages over open circuit scuba, and surface supply of breathing gas is impracticable. The main advantages of rebreather diving are extended gas endurance, low noise levels, and lack of bubbles.

Rebreathers are generally used for scuba applications, but are also occasionally used for bailout systems for surface-supplied diving. Gas reclaim systems used for deep heliox diving use similar technology to rebreathers, as do saturation diving life-support systems, but in these applications the gas recycling equipment is not carried by the diver. Atmospheric diving suits also carry rebreather technology to recycle breathing gas as part of the life-support system, but this article covers the procedures of ambient pressure diving using rebreathers carried by the diver.

Rebreathers are generally more complex to use than open circuit scuba, and have more potential points of failure, so acceptably safe use requires a greater level of skill, attention and situational awareness, which is usually derived from understanding the systems, diligent maintenance and overlearning the practical skills of operation and fault recovery. Fault tolerant design can make a rebreather less likely to fail in a way that immediately endangers the user, and reduces the task loading on the diver which in turn may lower the risk of operator error.

== Concept ==
Rebreather diving is a mode of underwater diving which uses a diving rebreather for breathing gas supply at ambient pressure in an underwater environment.

== Comparison with open circuit ==
=== Basic principle ===
At shallow depths, a diver using open-circuit breathing apparatus typically only uses about a quarter of the oxygen in the air that is breathed in, which is about 4 to 5% of the inspired volume. The remaining oxygen is exhaled along with nitrogen and carbon dioxide – about 95% of the volume. As the diver goes deeper, much the same mass of oxygen is used, which represents an increasingly smaller fraction of the inhaled gas. Since only a small part of the oxygen, and virtually none of the inert gas is consumed, every exhaled breath from an open-circuit scuba set represents at least 95% wasted potentially useful gas volume, which has to be replaced from the breathing gas supply.

A rebreather retains most of the exhaled gas for re-use and does not discharge it immediately to the surroundings. The inert gas and unused oxygen is kept for reuse, and the rebreather adds gas to replace the oxygen that was consumed, and removes the carbon dioxide. Thus, the gas recirculated in the rebreather remains breathable and supports life and the diver needs only to carry a fraction of the gas that would be needed for an open-circuit system. The saving is proportional to the ambient pressure, so is greater for deeper dives, and is particularly significant when expensive mixtures containing helium are used as the inert gas diluent. The rebreather also adds gas to compensate for compression when dive depth increases, and vents gas to prevent overexpansion when depth decreases.

=== Advantages ===
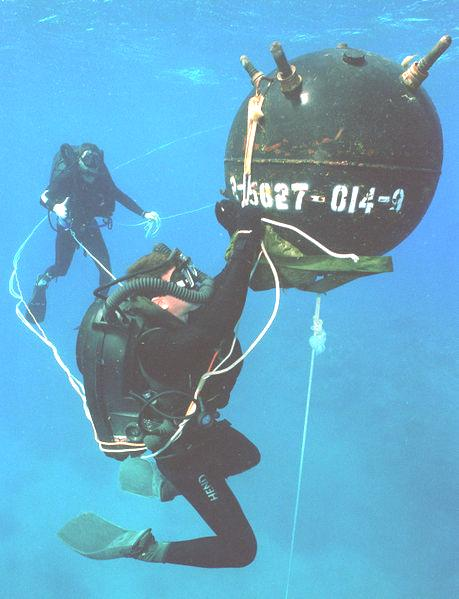
US Navy explosive ordnance disposal (EOD) divers

==== Efficiency advantages ====
The main advantage of the rebreather over open circuit breathing equipment is economical use of gas. With open circuit scuba, the entire breath is expelled into the surrounding water when the diver exhales. A breath inhaled from an open circuit scuba system with cylinders filled with compressed air is about 21% oxygen. When that breath is exhaled back into the surrounding environment, it has an oxygen level in the range of 15 to 16% when the diver is at atmospheric pressure. This leaves the available oxygen use at about 25%; the remaining 75% is lost. As the remaining 79% of the breathing gas (mostly nitrogen) is inert, the diver on open-circuit scuba only uses about 5% of the cylinders' contents.

At depth, this advantage of a rebreather is even more marked. The diver's metabolic rate is independent of ambient pressure (i.e. depth), so the oxygen consumption rate does not change with depth. The production of carbon dioxide does not change either since it also depends on the metabolic rate. This is a marked difference from open circuit where the amount of gas consumed increases as depth increases since the density of the inhaled gas increases with pressure, and the volume of a breath remains almost unchanged.

==== Feasibility advantages ====
Very long or deep dives using open circuit scuba equipment may not be feasible as there are limits to the number and weight of diving cylinders the diver can carry. The economy of gas consumption of a rebreather is also useful when the gas mix being breathed contains expensive gases, such as helium. In normal use at constant depth, only oxygen is consumed: small volumes of inert gases are lost during any one dive, due mainly to venting of the gas as it expands on ascent. For example, a closed circuit rebreather diver theoretically need not use up any more diluent gas after reaching the full depth of the dive. On ascent, no diluent is added, but most of the gas in the loop is lost as it expands and is vented. A very small amount of trimix could therefore last for many dives. It is possible for a 3-litre (19 cubic foot nominal capacity) diluent cylinder to last for eight 40 m (130 ft) dives.

==== Other advantages ====
- Except on ascent, closed circuit rebreathers produce no bubbles during normal operation, and make no bubble noise and much less gas hissing, compared to open-circuit scuba; this can conceal military divers and allow divers engaged in marine biology and underwater photography to avoid alarming marine animals and thereby get closer to them.
- This lack of bubbles allows wreck divers to enter enclosed areas on sunken ships without slowly filling them with air, which can accelerate rusting, and is also an advantage in cave diving if there is loose material on the ceiling which can be dislodged by bubbles, reducing visibility.
- The fully closed circuit rebreather can be used to optimise the proportion of inert gases in the breathing mix, and therefore minimise the decompression requirements of the diver, by maintaining a specific and nearly constant relatively high oxygen partial pressure ($P_{O_2}$) at all depths.
- The breathing gas in a rebreather loop is warmer and more humid than the dry and cold gas from open circuit equipment, making it more comfortable to breathe on long dives and causing less dehydration and chilling of the diver.
- Many rebreathers have a system of oxygen sensors, which allow the diver or a control circuit to adjust the partial pressure of oxygen. This can offer a dramatic advantage at the end of deeper dives, where a diver can raise the partial pressure of oxygen during decompression, permitting shorter decompression times. Care must be taken that the partial pressure of oxygen is not set to a level where it can become toxic. Research has shown that a partial pressure of oxygen of 1.6 bar can produce acute toxicity symptoms with extended exposure.
- Mass loss over the dive is reduced as a much smaller amount of gas is used, so buoyancy at constant depth does not vary much as the dive progresses, and less ballast weight is needed to compensate for gas consumption.

=== Disadvantages ===
When compared with open circuit scuba, rebreathers have some disadvantages, including expense, complexity of operation and maintenance, and more critical paths to failure. A malfunctioning rebreather can supply a gas mixture which contains too little oxygen to sustain life, too much oxygen which may cause convulsions, or it may allow carbon dioxide to build up to dangerous levels. Some rebreather designers try to solve these problems by monitoring the system with electronics, sensors and alarm systems. These are expensive and susceptible to failure, improper configuration and misuse.

- Oxygen rebreathers (simple closed circuit) are limited to a shallow depth range of approximately 6 m, beyond which the risk of acute oxygen toxicity rises to unacceptable levels very rapidly.
- Semi-closed circuit rebreathers are less efficient than closed circuit, and are more mechanically complex than open circuit scuba or oxygen rebreathers.
- Closed circuit rebreathers are yet more mechanically complex, and generally rely on electronic instruments and control systems to monitor and maintain a safe breathing gas mixture. This makes them more expensive to produce, more complex to maintain and test, and sensitive to getting their circuitry wet.
- Depending on the complexity of the rebreather, there are more failure modes than for open circuit scuba, and several of these failure modes are safety-critical and not easily recognized by the diver without technological intervention. A major disadvantage of a rebreather is that, due to a failure, gas may continue to be available for breathing, but the mixture provided may not support consciousness, and this may not be apparent to the user. With open circuit, this type of failure can only occur if the diver selects an unsuitable gas, and the most common type of open circuit failure, the lack of gas supply, is immediately obvious, and corrective steps like changing to an alternative supply would be taken immediately.

The bailout requirement of rebreather diving can sometimes require a rebreather diver to carry almost as much bulk of cylinders as an open-circuit diver so the diver can complete the necessary decompression stops if the rebreather fails completely. Some rebreather divers choose not to carry enough bailout for a safe ascent breathing open circuit, but instead rely on the rebreather, believing that an irrecoverable rebreather failure is very unlikely. This practice is known as alpinism or alpinist diving and is generally deprecated due to the perceived extremely high risk of death if the rebreather fails.

=== Other differences ===
A major difference between rebreather diving and open-circuit scuba diving is in fine control of neutral buoyancy. When an open-circuit scuba diver inhales, a quantity of highly compressed gas from their cylinder is reduced in pressure by a regulator, and enters the lungs at a much higher volume than it occupied in the cylinder. This means that the diver has a tendency to rise slightly with each inhalation, and sink slightly with each exhalation. This does not happen to a rebreather diver, because the diver is circulating a roughly constant volume of gas between their lungs and the counterlung. This is not specifically an advantage or disadvantage, but it requires some practice to adjust to the difference.

== Function ==
A rebreather functions by removing carbon dioxide from the exhaled gas, replenishing oxygen used, and providing the recycled gas at ambient pressure for the diver to inhale.

=== Scrubber endurance ===
In rebreather diving, the typical effective endurance of the scrubber will be half an hour to several hours of breathing, depending on the type and size of the scrubber, the absorbent characteristics, the ambient temperature and pressure, the operational mechanics of the rebreather, and the amount of carbon dioxide produced by the diver, which mainly depends on their metabolic work rate.

=== Controlling the mix ===
A basic need with a rebreather is to keep the partial pressure of oxygen ($P_{O_2}$) in the mix from getting too low (causing hypoxia) or too high (causing oxygen toxicity). In humans, the urge to breathe is normally caused by a high level of carbon dioxide in the blood, rather than lack of oxygen. If not enough new oxygen is being added, the proportion of oxygen in the loop may become too low to support consciousness, and eventually too low to support life. The resulting serious hypoxia causes sudden blackout with little or no warning. This makes hypoxia a deadly hazard for rebreather divers.

The method used for controlling the range of oxygen partial pressure in the breathing loop depends on the type of rebreather.

In an oxygen rebreather, once the loop has been thoroughly flushed, the mixture is effectively static at 100% oxygen, and the partial pressure is a function only of depth. In some early oxygen rebreathers the diver had to manually open and close the valve to the oxygen cylinder to refill the counter-lung each time the volume got low. In others a small continuous oxygen flow is provided by a flow restricting valve, but the set also has a manual bypass valve for descent and when consumption exceeds supply. In more advanced oxygen rebreathers, the pressure in the counter-lung controls the oxygen flow with a demand valve which will add gas when the bag is empty and internal pressure drops below ambient.

In a semi-closed rebreather the loop mix depends on a combination of factors:

- the type of gas addition system and its setting, combined with the gas mixture in use, which control the rate of oxygen added. Oxygen fraction is limited by the gas mix. It can be lower but not higher.
- work rate, and therefore the oxygen consumption rate, which controls the rate of oxygen depletion, and therefore the resulting oxygen fraction.
- depth, which has the usual effect of increasing partial pressure in proportion to ambient pressure and oxygen fraction.

In manually controlled closed circuit rebreathers the diver controls the gas mix and volume in the loop by manually injecting oxygen and diluent gases to the loop and by venting the loop. The loop has a pressure relief valve to prevent damage caused by over-pressure of the loop when the mouthpiece valve is closed.

Narked at 90 Ltd – deep pursuit advanced electronic rebreather controller

Electronically controlled closed-circuit rebreathers have electro-galvanic oxygen sensors which monitor the partial pressure of oxygen, and electronic control systems, which inject more oxygen to maintain the set point, and issuing an audible, visual, or vibratory warning to the diver if the partial pressure of oxygen reaches dangerously high or low levels.

The volume in the loop of both SCRs and CCRs is usually maintained by a pressure controlled automatic diluent valve, which works on the same principle as a demand valve, to add diluent when inhalation lowers the pressure in the loop during descent or if the diver removes gas from the loop by exhaling through the nose.

==== Set-points ====
A set-point (or set point) is a factory set or user programmable limit value for the desired partial pressure of oxygen in a rebreather loop. The feedback of actual oxygen partial pressure measured by the oxygen sensors is compared with the set-points, and if it deviates outside of the limits of upper and lower set-points, the control system will activate a solenoid valve to add oxygen or diluent gas to the loop to correct the oxygen content until it is back within the set-point limits. Usually the user can override the gas addition by manual activation of injection valves.

Some control systems allow depth activated switching of set-points, so that one pair of set-points can be selected for the main part of the dive, and another pair, usually richer, for accelerated decompression above the limiting depth. The changeover is automatic during ascent, but the high set-points are not activated before ascent as they are generally undesirable during descent and the main part of the dive.

The deep sector set-point is chosen to minimise decompression obligation while also maintaining a low risk of oxygen toxicity over the expected dive duration. Values ranging from around 1.4 bar for a short dive to 1.0 bar for a very long dive can be used, with 1.2 to 1.3 bar being a frequent general purpose compromise. (see US Navy rebreather tables). The decompression set-point tends to be a bit higher to accelerate elimination of inert gases, while retaining a low risk of oxygen toxicity. Values between 1.4 and 1.6 bar are generally chosen, depending on the expected duration of decompression.

=== Gas endurance ===
Gas endurance depends on the amount of gas available and the control system for injection to maintain the oxygen partial pressure set points. These include constant mass flow, manual control, and automated control by injecting gas via a solenoid valve. The injection may follow the "bang-bang", "on-off", or "hysteresis" model, where the valve is activated and gas is injected until it reaches the upper set point limit, deactivated until the partial pressure reduces to the lower set point limit, and injection is started again, or more complex models such as proportional-integral-derivative (PID) control, in which the injection rate is controlled taking into account current rate of use, and changes to the rate of use. The gas endurance can be affected by the control model used.

== Calculating the loop mix ==
In closed circuit rebreathers the breathing loop gas mixture is either known (100% oxygen) or monitored and controlled within set limits, by either the diver or the control circuitry, but in the case of semi-closed rebreathers, where the gas mixture depends on the predive settings and diver exertion, it is necessary to calculate the possible range of gas composition during a dive. The calculation depends on the mode of gas addition.

=== Oxygen partial pressure in a semi-closed rebreather ===
A diver with a constant workload during aerobic working conditions will use an approximately constant amount of oxygen $V_{O_2}$ as a fraction of the respiratory minute volume (RMV, or $V_E$). This ratio of minute ventilation and oxygen uptake is the extraction ratio $K_E$, and usually falls in the range of 17 to 25 with a normal value of about 20 for healthy humans. Values as low as 10 and as high as 30 have been measured. Variations may be caused by the diet of the diver and the dead space of the diver and equipment, raised levels of carbon dioxide, or raised work of breathing and tolerance to carbon dioxide.

$K_E=\frac{V_E}{V_{O_2}}$ (≅20)

Therefore, the volume of gas in the breathing circuit can be described as approximately constant, and the fresh gas addition must balance the sum of the dumped volume, the metabolically removed oxygen, and the volume change due to depth change (metabolic carbon dioxide added to the mixture is removed by the scrubber and therefore does not affect the equation).

==== Constant mass flow ====
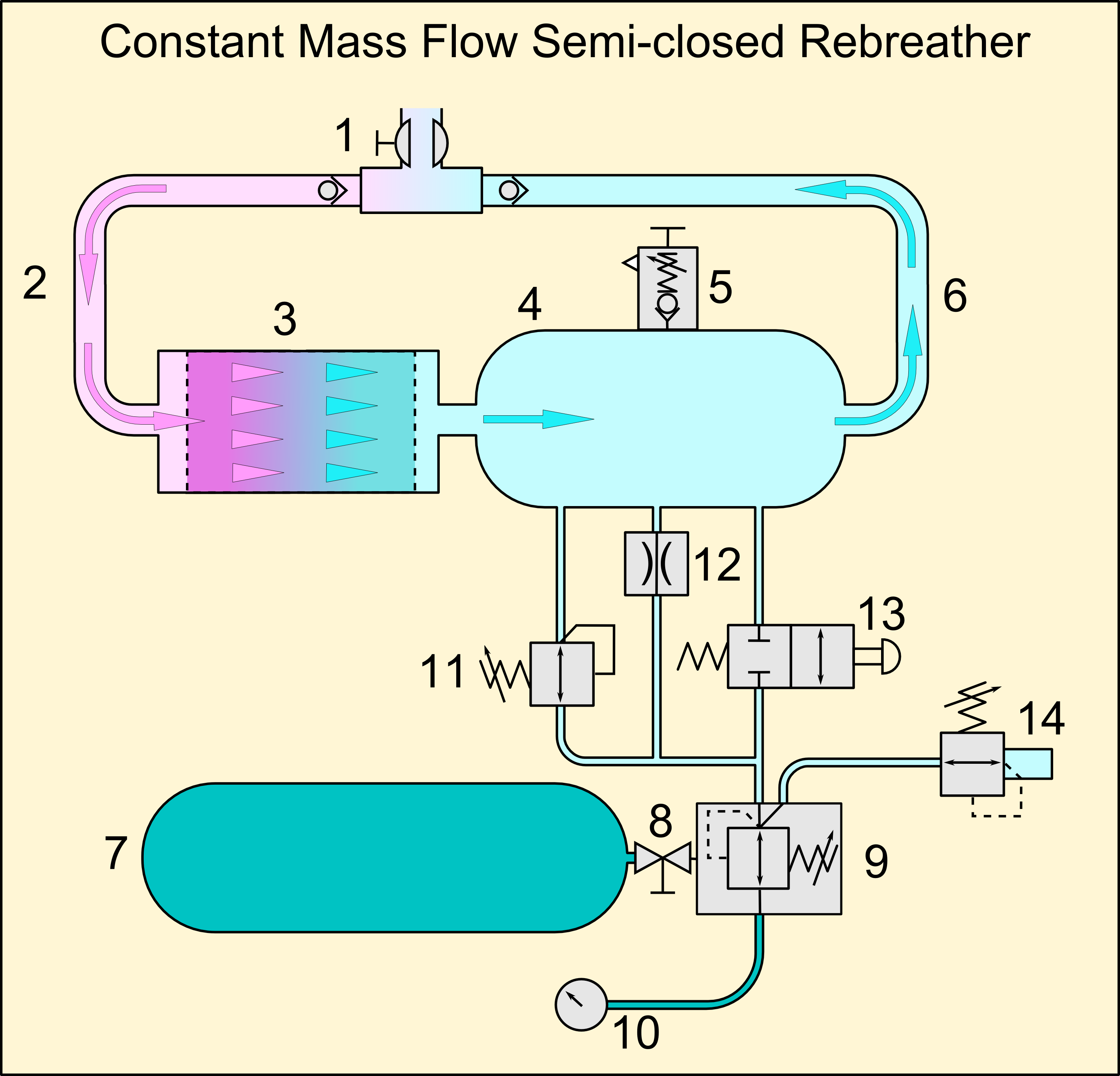
Loop and pneumatics schematic diagram of a typical constant mass flow semi-closed rebreather 1 Dive/surface valve with loop non-return valves 2 Exhaust hose 3 Scrubber canister (axial flow) 4 Counterlung 5 Loop overpressure valve 6 Inhalation valve 7 Breathing gas supply cylinder 8 Cylinder valve 9 Absolute pressure regulator 10 Submersible pressure gauge 11 Automatic Diluent Valve 12 Constant Mass Flow metering orifice 13 Manual bypass valve 14 Bailout demand valve

Oxygen partial pressure in a constant mass flow system is controlled by the flow rate of feed gas through the orifice and the oxygen consumption of the diver. Dump rate is equal to feed rate minus oxygen consumption for this case. The change in the fraction of oxygen $dF_{O_2loop}$ in the breathing circuit may be described by the following equation:

$$V_{loop}\times dF_{O_2loop}=(Q_{feed}\times F_{O_2feed}-V_{O_2}-(Q_{feed}-V_{O_2})\times F_{O_2loop})dt$$

Where:

$V_{loop}$ = volume of the breathing circuit
$Q_{feed}$ = flow rate of the fresh gas supplied by the orifice
$F_{O_2feed}$ = oxygen fraction of the supply gas
$V_{O_2}$ = oxygen uptake flow rate of the diver

This leads to the differential equation:

$$\frac{dF_{O_2loop}}{dt}=\frac{(Q_{feed}\times F_{O_2feed}-V_{O_2}(t)-(Q_{feed}-V_{O_2})\times F_{O_2loop}(t))}{V_{loop}}$$

With solution:

$$F_{O_2loop}(t)=\frac{Q_{feed}\times F_{O_2feed}-V_{O_2}}{Q_{feed}-V_{O_2}}+(F_{O_2loop}^{start}-\frac{Q_{feed}\times F_{O_2feed}-V_{O_2}}{Q_{feed}-V_{O_2}})\times e^{-\frac{Q_{feed}-V_{O_2}}{V_{loop}}t}$$

Which comprises a steady state and a transient term.

The steady state term is sufficient for most calculations:

The steady state oxygen fraction in the breathing circuit, $F_{O_2loop}$, can be calculated from the formula:

$$F_{O_2loop}=\frac{(Q_{feed}\times F_{O_2feed}-V_{O_2})}{(Q_{feed}-V_{O_2})}$$

Where:

$Q_{feed}$ = Flow rate of fresh gas supplied by the orifice
$V_{O_2}$ = Oxygen uptake flow rate of the diver
$F_{O_2feed}$ = Oxygen fraction of the supply gas

in a consistent system of units.

As oxygen consumption is an independent variable, a fixed feed rate will give a range of possible oxygen fractions for any given depth. In the interests of safety, the range can be determined by calculating oxygen fraction for maximum and minimum oxygen consumption as well as the expected rate.

==== Passive addition ====
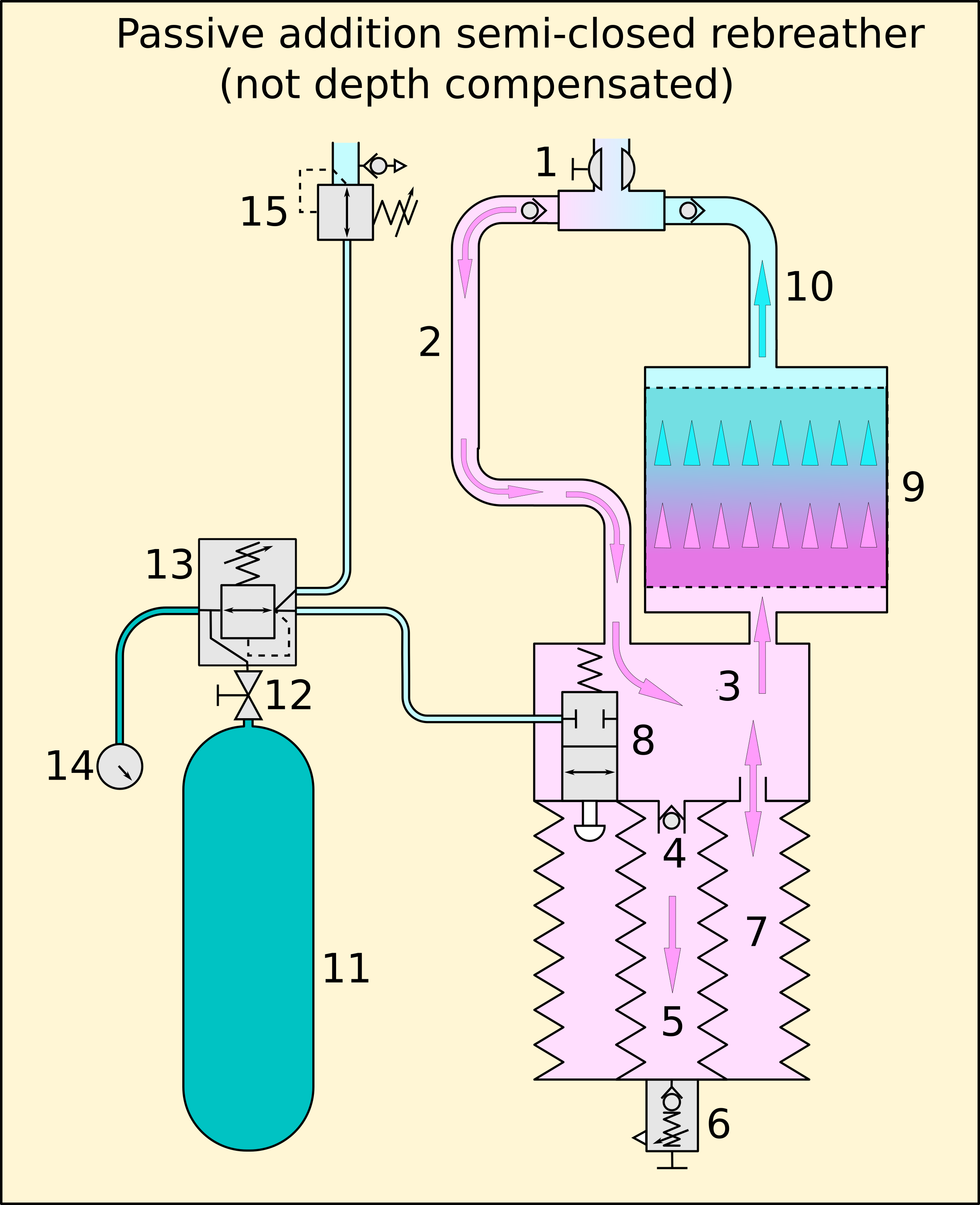
Schematic diagram of the breathing gas circuit of a passive addition semi-closed circuit rebreather 1 Dive/surface valve with loop non-return valves 2 Exhalation hose 3 Counterlung fore-chamber 4 Non-return valve to discharge bellows 5 Discharge bellows 6 Overpressure valve 7 Main counterlung bellows 8 Addition valve 9 Scrubber (axial flow) 10 Inhalation hose 11 Breathing gas storage cylinder 12 Cylinder valve 13 Regulator first stage 14 Submersible pressure gauge 15 Bailout demand valve

(non-depth-compensated, also known as Variable Volume Exhaust (VVE))

Oxygen partial pressure in a passive addition system is controlled by the breathing rate of the diver. Feed gas is added by a valve which is equivalent to an open circuit demand valve in function, which opens to supply gas when the counterlung is empty – the moving top plate of the counterlung works like the diaphragm of a demand valve to operate the lever opening the valve when the counterlung volume is low. The volume may be low because the internal bellows has discharged a part of the previous breath to the environment, or because an increase in depth has caused the contents to be compressed, or a combination of these causes. The oxygen used by the diver also slowly decreases the volume of gas in the loop.

The change in the fraction of oxygen $dF_{O_2loop}$ in the system may be described by the following equation:

$$V_{loop}\times dF_{O_2loop}=((Q_{dump}+V_{O_2})\times F_{O_2feed}-V_{O_2}-Q_{dump}\times F_{O_2loop})dt$$

Where:

$V_{loop}$ = volume of the breathing circuit
$F_{O_2loop}$ = oxygen fraction of the gas mixture in the breathing circuit
$Q_{dump}$ = flow of dumped gas
$V_{O_2}$ = oxygen uptake rate of the diver
$F_{O_2feed}$ = oxygen fraction of the feed gas

This leads to the differential equation:

$$\frac{dF_{O_2loop}}{dt}=\frac{((Q_{dump}+V_{O_2})\times F_{O_2feed}(t)-V_{O_2}-Q_{dump}\times F_{O_2loop}(t))}{V_{loop}}$$

With solution:

$$F_{O_2loop}(t)=\frac{(Q_{dump}+V_{O_2})\times F_{O_2feed}-V_{O_2}}{Q_{dump}}+(F_{O_2loop}^{start}-\frac{(Q_{dump}+V_{O_2})\times F_{O_2feed}-V_{O_2}}{Q_{dump}})\times e^{-\frac{Q_{dump}}{V_{loop}}t}$$

Which comprises a steady state and a transient term.

The steady state term is sufficient for most calculations:

$$F_{O_2bag}(t)=\frac{(Q_{dump}+V_{O_2})\times F_{O_2feed}-V_{O_2}}{Q_{dump}}$$

The steady state oxygen fraction in the breathing circuit, $F_{O_2loop}$, can be calculated from the formula:
$$F_{O_2loop}=\frac{(Q_{dump}+V_{O_2})F_{O_2feed}-V_{O_2}}{Q_{dump}}$$

Where:

$Q_{dump}$ = Flow rate of gas dumped by the concentric bellows
$V_{O_2}$ = Oxygen uptake flow rate of the diver
$F_{O_2feed}$ = Oxygen fraction of the supply gas

in a consistent system of units.

The gas volume dumped is related to the expired minute volume and ambient pressure, $P_{amb}$:

$$Q_{dump}=P_{amb}\times K_{bellows}\times V_E$$

Where:

$K_{bellows}$ = bellows ratio – the ratio between the volume of expired air in the counterlungs and the amount dumped.
$V_E$ = respiratory minute volume.

By substitution:

$$Q_{dump}=P_{amb}\times K_{bellows}\times K_E\times V_{O_2}$$

Which can be inserted into the steady state equation to give:

$$F_{O_2loop}=\frac{(P_{amb}\times K_{bellows}\times K_E\times V_{O_2}+V_{O_2})F_{O_2feed}-V_{O_2}}{P_{amb}\times K_{bellows}\times K_E\times V_{O_2}}$$

Which simplifies to:

$$F_{O_2loop}=\frac{(P_{amb}\times K_{bellows}\times K_E+1)F_{O_2feed}-1}{P_{amb}\times K_{bellows}\times K_E}$$

In this case oxygen consumption and feed rate are strongly related, and the oxygen concentration in the loop is independent of oxygen uptake and is likely to remain within fairly close tolerances of the calculated value for a given depth.

The oxygen fraction of the gas in the circuit will approximate the feed gas more closely for greater depth.

The derivation above does not take into account the temperature difference between the lung contents at 37 °C and the breathing loop, which will normally be at a lower temperature. RMV is given in litres per minute at body temperature and ambient pressure, oxygen consumption in standard litres per minute (STP) and the total volume of the lungs and breathing loop in actual litres. This can be corrected by using the general gas equation of state to provide values for these variables at the temperature of the gas in the circuit. The effect of the temperature corrections is generally a slightly lower value for loop gas oxygen fraction.

=== Maximum operating depth ===
MOD for a closed circuit mixed gas rebreather is usually based on the MOD of the diluent, as that is the leanest mix that can be guaranteed. After a diluent flush the gas must be breathable, and this limits MOD, but it is possible to use more than one option for diluent, and switch the gas to a hypoxic mix for the deeper sector of a dive, and a normoxic mix for the shallower sectors.

MOD calculations for SCRs are usually based on the MOD for the full strength supply gas, as this can then be used for bailout at the full planned dive depth, and is the worst case estimate for the toxicity of the loop gas. MOD calculations can also be done for loop gas as calculated, but this is subject to variations which are not always accurately predictable. Loop gas calculated values for passive addition systems could possibly be used for working MOD calculation, and supply gas for emergency MOD given the relatively stable loop fraction in the passive addition systems, however the loop gas concentration may be closer to full strength if the diver works hard and ventilation increases beyond the linear extraction ratio.

== Safety ==
The general principle of substantive diving safety, that the diver must be able to deal with any single immediately life-threatening equipment failure with significant risk without outside assistance, holds for rebreather diving. If recovery from a failure leaves the diver in a compromised position where there is a high risk of a single point failure mode which can no longer be managed by the diver, the dive should be terminated.

Rebreathers have an intrinsically higher risk of mechanical or electrical failure because of their structural and functional complexity, but this can be mitigated by good design which provides redundancy of critical items and by carrying sufficient alternative breathing gas supplies for bailout including any required decompression in case of failure. Fault tolerant design, designs that minimize risk of human-machine interface errors, and adequate training in procedures that deal with this area may help reduce the fatality rate.

Some rebreather diving safety issues can be addressed by training, others may require a change in technical diver safety culture. A major safety issue is that many divers become complacent as they become more familiar with the equipment, and begin to neglect predive checklists while assembling and preparing the equipment for use – procedures which are officially part of all rebreather training programmes. There can also be a tendency to neglect post-dive maintenance, and some divers will dive knowing that there are functional problems with the unit, because they know that there is generally redundancy designed into the system. This redundancy is intended to allow a safe termination of the dive if it occurs underwater, by eliminating a critical failure point. Diving with a unit that already has a malfunction, means that there is a single critical point of failure in that unit, which could cause a life-threatening emergency if another item in the critical path were to fail. The risk may increase by orders of magnitude.

=== Hazards ===
In addition to the risk of other diving disorders that open circuit divers are exposed to, rebreather divers are also more exposed to hazards which are directly connected with the effectiveness and reliability of generic and specific rebreather design and construction, not necessarily with the principles of rebreathing:

- Sudden blackout due to hypoxia caused by too low a partial pressure of oxygen in the loop. A particular problem is the drop in ambient pressure caused by the ascent phase of the dive, which can reduce the partial pressure of oxygen to hypoxic levels leading to what is sometimes called shallow-water blackout.
- Seizures due to oxygen toxicity caused by too high a partial pressure of oxygen in the loop. This can be caused by the rise in ambient pressure caused by the descent phase of the dive, which raises the partial pressure of oxygen to hyperoxic levels. In fully closed circuit equipment, ageing oxygen sensors may become "current limited" and fail to measure high partial pressures of oxygen resulting in dangerously high oxygen levels.
- Disorientation, panic, headache, and hyperventilation due to excess of carbon dioxide caused by incorrect configuration, failure or inefficiency of the scrubber. The scrubber must be configured so that no exhaled gas can bypass it; it must be packed and sealed correctly, and it has a limited capacity for absorption of carbon dioxide. Another problem is the diver producing carbon dioxide faster than the absorbent can handle; for example, during hard work, fast swimming, or high work of breathing caused by excessive depth for the loop configuration and gas mixture combination. The solution to this is to reduce effort and let the absorbent catch up. The scrubber efficiency may be reduced at depth where the increased concentration of other gas molecules, due to pressure, prevents some of the carbon dioxide molecules reaching the active ingredient of the scrubber before the gas gets out the far side of the absorbent stack. Low temperatures in the scrubber will also slow down the reaction rate. Hypercapnia in particular is known for causing cognitive impairment even well before the level at which more obvious symptoms are displayed, and this may delay bailout to a stage where it may no longer be possible for the diver to remove the mouthpiece to switch gases.
- The diver should keep breathing constantly to maintain consistent gas flow at moderate flow velocities over the carbon dioxide absorbent, so the absorbent can work most effectively. Divers need to lose any skip-breathing habits that may have been developed while diving with open-circuit scuba. In closed circuit rebreathers, constant moderate breathing also has the effect of mixing the gas, preventing oxygen-rich and oxygen-lean volumes developing within the loop, which may cause unrepresentative measurement of oxygen partial pressure and consequently misleading information to the oxygen control system. The reduced maximum flow rates of deep, steady breathing both increase average dwell time in the scrubber, and resistive work of breathing.
- "Caustic cocktail" in the loop if water comes into contact with the soda lime used in the carbon dioxide scrubber. The diver is normally alerted to this by a chalky taste in the mouth. A safe response is to bail out to "open circuit" and rinse the mouth out.
- Slow low-temperature start-up of the carbon dioxide-absorbing chemical. This is a particular problem with the Chemox chemical rebreather which requires breath moisture to activate the potassium superoxide and the carbon dioxide absorption. A chlorate candle can be provided that produces enough oxygen to allow the user's breath to activate the system.
- A breathing loop may become contaminated by pathogens if not sufficiently cleaned and disinfected between uses or between users. These pathogens may infect subsequent users. Operating manuals include instructions for cleaning and disinfection which have been tested and do not unduly harm the equipment, but are not necessarily effective on all possible pathogens.

=== Inherent limitations of the types of rebreather ===
Each type of rebreather has limitations on safe operating range, and specific hazards inherent to the method of operation, which affect the operating range and operating procedures.

==== Oxygen rebreather ====
Oxygen rebreathers are simple and reliable due to their simplicity. The gas mixture is known and reliable providing the loop is adequately flushed at the start of a dive and the correct gas is used. There is little that can go wrong with the function other than flooding, leaking, running out of gas, and scrubber breakthrough, all of which are obvious to the user, and there is no risk of decompression sickness, so emergency free ascent to the surface is always an option in open water. The critical limitation of the oxygen rebreather is the very shallow maximum operating depth limit, due to oxygen toxicity considerations.

==== Active addition SCR ====
Active addition SCRs vary in complexity, but all operate with a breathing loop which is normally near the upper limit of its capacity. Therefore, if the gas addition system fails, the volume of gas in the loop will generally remain sufficient to provide no warning to the diver that the oxygen is depleting, and the risk of hypoxia is relatively high.

===== Constant mass flow SCR =====
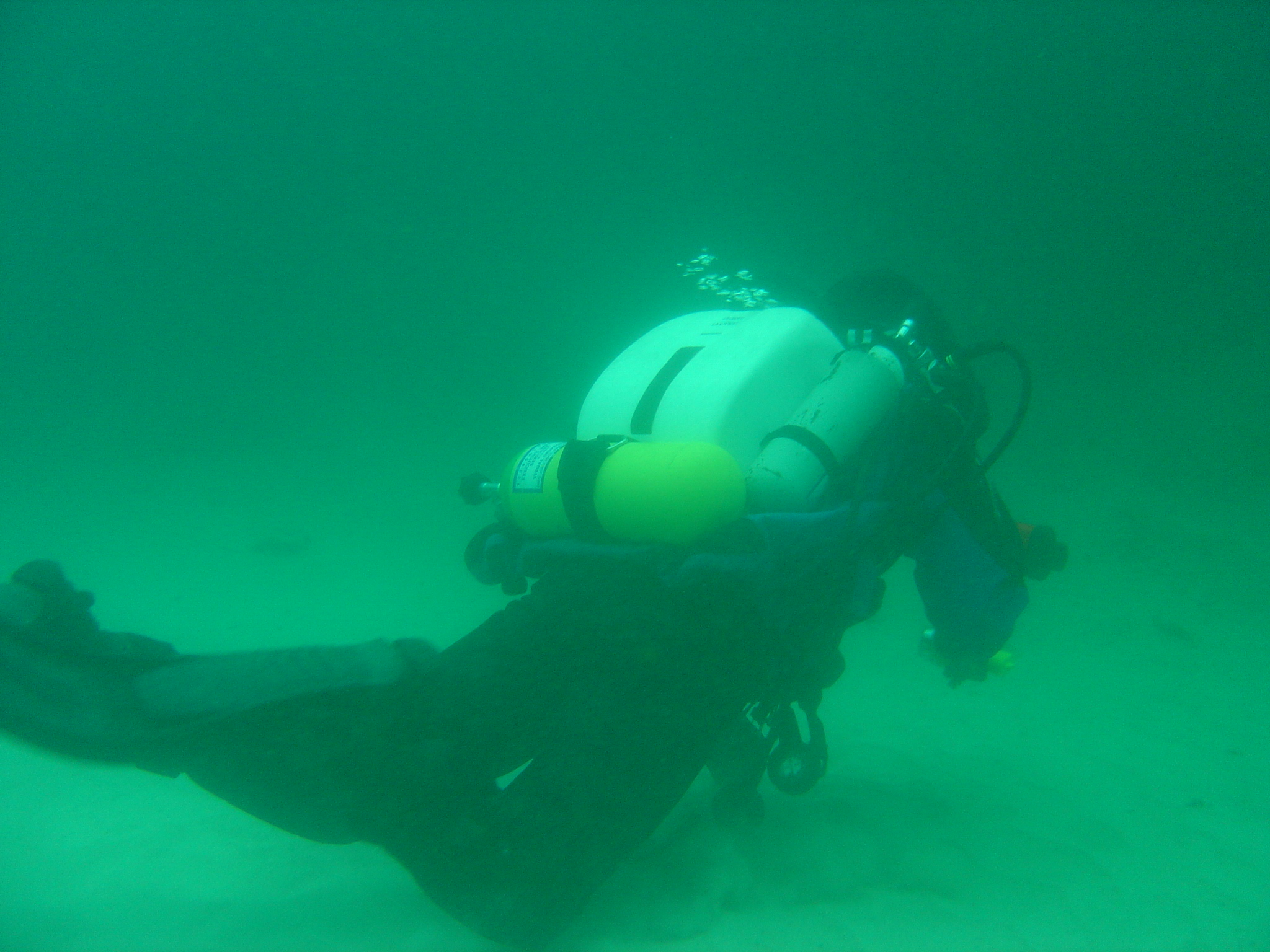
Scuba diver with Dräger Dolphin constant mass flow semi-closed circuit rebreather

Constant mass flow addition provides the loop with added gas which is independent of depth and metabolic oxygen consumption. If the addition to make up for depth increases is disregarded, the endurance of the unit is basically fixed for a given orifice and supply gas combination. However, the oxygen partial pressure will vary depending on metabolic requirements, and this is generally predictable only within limits. The uncertain composition of the gas means that worst case estimates are usually made for both maximum operating depth and decompression considerations. Unless the gas is monitored in real time by a decompression computer with an oxygen sensor, these rebreathers have a smaller safe depth range than open circuit on the same gas, and are a disadvantage for decompression.

A specific hazard of the gas metering system is that if the orifice is partly or completely blocked, the gas in the loop will be depleted of oxygen without the diver being aware of the problem. This can result in hypoxia and unconsciousness without warning. This can be mitigated by monitoring the partial pressure in real time using an oxygen sensor, but this adds to the complexity and cost of the equipment.

===== Demand controlled SCR =====
The principle of operation is to add a mass of oxygen that is proportional to ventilation volume. The fresh gas addition is made by controlling the pressure in a dosage chamber proportional to the counterlung bellows volume. The dosage chamber is filled with fresh gas to a pressure proportional to bellows volume, with the highest pressure when the bellows is in the empty position. When the bellows fills during exhalation, the gas is released from the dosage chamber into the breathing circuit, proportional to the volume in the bellows during exhalation, and is fully released when the bellows is full. Excess gas is dumped to the environment through the overpressure valve after the bellows is full.

There is no dosage dependency on depth or oxygen uptake. Dosage ratio is constant once the gas has been selected, and the variations remaining on oxygen fraction are due to variations in the extraction ratio. This system provides a fairly stable oxygen fraction which is a reasonable approximation of open circuit for decompression and maximum operating depth purposes.

If the gas supply to the dosage mechanism were to fail without warning, the gas addition would stop and the diver would use up the oxygen in the loop gas until it became hypoxic and the diver lost consciousness. To prevent this, a system is needed that warns the diver that there is a feed gas supply failure so the diver must take appropriate action. This can be done by purely mechanical methods.

==== Passive addition SCR ====
Passive addition relies on inhalation by the diver to trigger gas addition when the volume of gas in the breathing loop is low. This will provide warning to the diver if the addition system stops working for any reason, as the discharge system will continue to empty the loop and the diver will have a decreasing volume of gas to breathe from. This will generally provide adequate warning before hypoxia is likely.

A concentric bellows counterlung controlled gas addition mechanism relies on the full contraction of the counterlung to inject fresh gas. This works well to maintain the loop volume during descent, but may not be effective during ascent if the gas expansion in the loop due to ambient pressure reduction is fast enough to prevent the bellows from sufficiently activating the addition valve. This effect can be counteracted by a sufficiently slow ascent or frequent pauses during ascent to allow inhalation at constant depth. The severity of risk also depends on the oxygen fraction of the supply gas and the bellows ratio.

===== Non-depth compensated PASCR =====
Gas extension for the non-depth compensated passive addition SCR is directly proportional to the bellows ratio – the proportion of gas that is discharged during each breath cycle. A small ratio means that the amount of gas added each cycle is small, and the gas is rebreathed more times, but it also means that more oxygen is removed from the loop gas mix, and at shallow depths the oxygen deficit compared to the supply gas concentration is large. A large bellows ratio adds a larger proportion of the breath volume as fresh gas, and this keeps the gas mix closer to supply composition at shallow depth, but uses the gas up faster.

The mechanism is mechanically simple and reliable, and not sensitive to blockage by small particles. It is more likely to leak than block, which would use gas faster, but not compromise the safety of the gas mixture. Oxygen fraction of the loop gas is considerably less than of the supply gas in shallow water, and only slightly less at deeper depths, so the safe depth range for a given supply gas is smaller than for open circuit, and the variation in oxygen concentration is also disadvantageous for decompression. Gas switching may compensate for this limitation at the expense of complexity of construction and operation. The ability to switch to open circuit in shallow depths is an option which can compensate for the reduction in oxygen content at those depth, at the expense of operational complexity and greatly increased gas use while on open circuit. This may be considered a relatively minor problem if the requirement for bailout gas is considered. The diver will be carrying the gas anyway, and using it for decompression at the end of a dive does not increase the volume requirement for dive planning.

The loop oxygen fraction is critically dependent on an accurate assumption of the extraction ratio. If this is chosen incorrectly the oxygen fraction may differ significantly from the calculated value. Very little information on variation of extraction ratio is available in easily accessible references.

===== Depth compensated PASCR =====
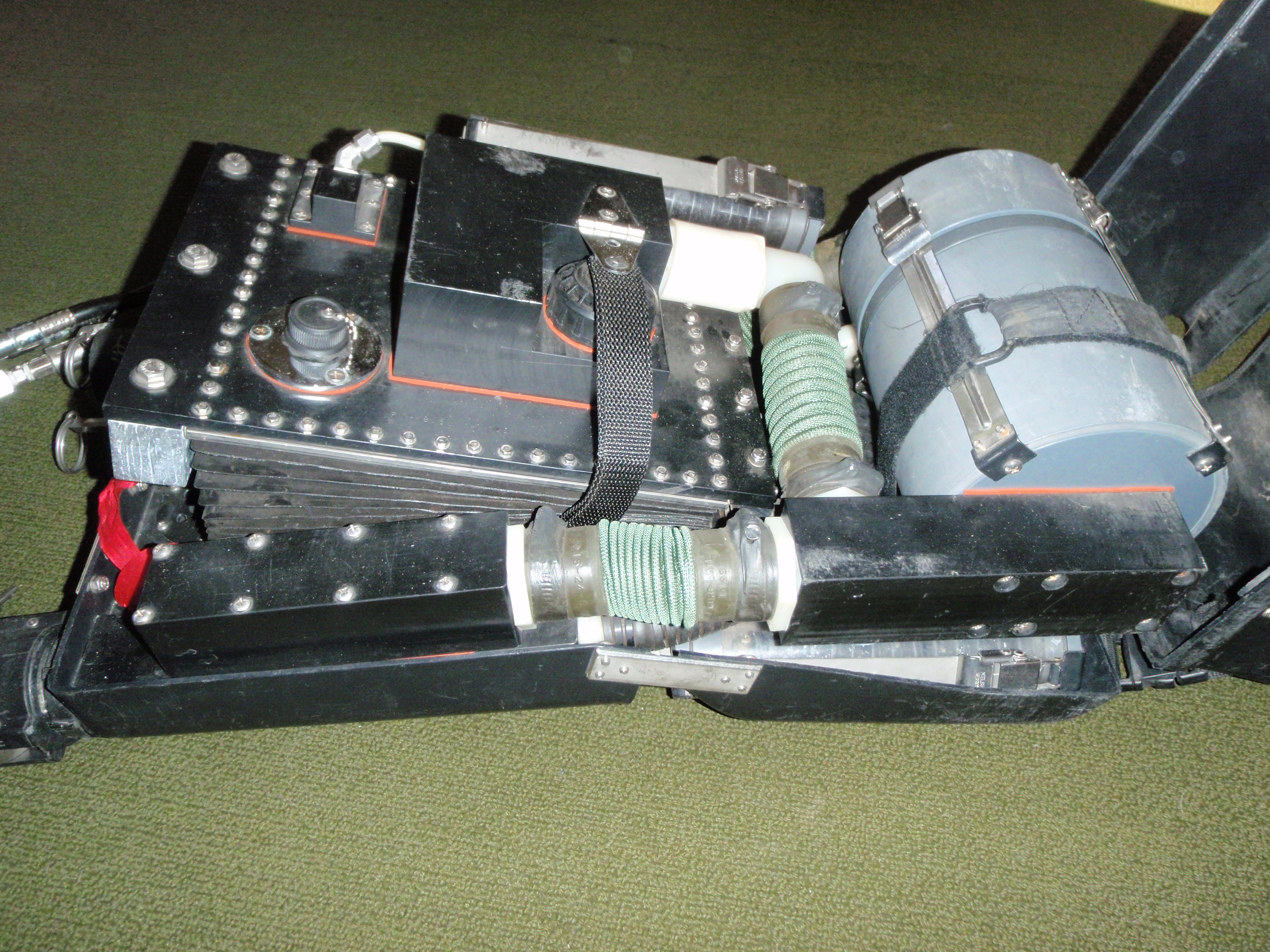
Halcyon PVR-BASC, a depth compensated passive addition semi-closed rebreather

Gas extension for the depth compensated passive addition rebreather is approximately proportional to metabolic usage. The volume of gas dumped by the system is, for a given depth, a fixed fraction of the volume breathed by the diver, as in the case of the non-depth-compensated system. However, this ratio is changed in inverse proportion to ambient pressure – the bellows ratio is greatest at the surface, and decreases with depth. The effect is for an amount of gas of reasonably constant mass proportion to oxygen usage to be discharged, and the same amount, on average, is supplied by the addition valve, to make up the loop volume at steady state. This is very similar to the demand controlled SCR in effect on the oxygen fraction of the loop gas, which remains nearly constant at all depths where the compensation is linear, and for aerobic levels of exercise. The limitations on this system appear to be mainly in the mechanical complexity, bulk and mass of the equipment. The linearity of depth compensation is limited by structural considerations, and below a certain depth the compensation will be less effective, and finally dissipate. However, this does not have a great effect on oxygen fraction, as the changes at those depths are already small. The slightly higher concentrations in this case are a bit nearer to the supply gas value than if the compensation was still effective. The depth compensated PASCR can provide almost identical breathing gas to open circuit over a large depth range, with a small and nearly constant oxygen fraction in the breathing gas, eliminating a major limitation of the non-compensated system at the expense of mechanical complexity.

==== Mixed gas CCR ====
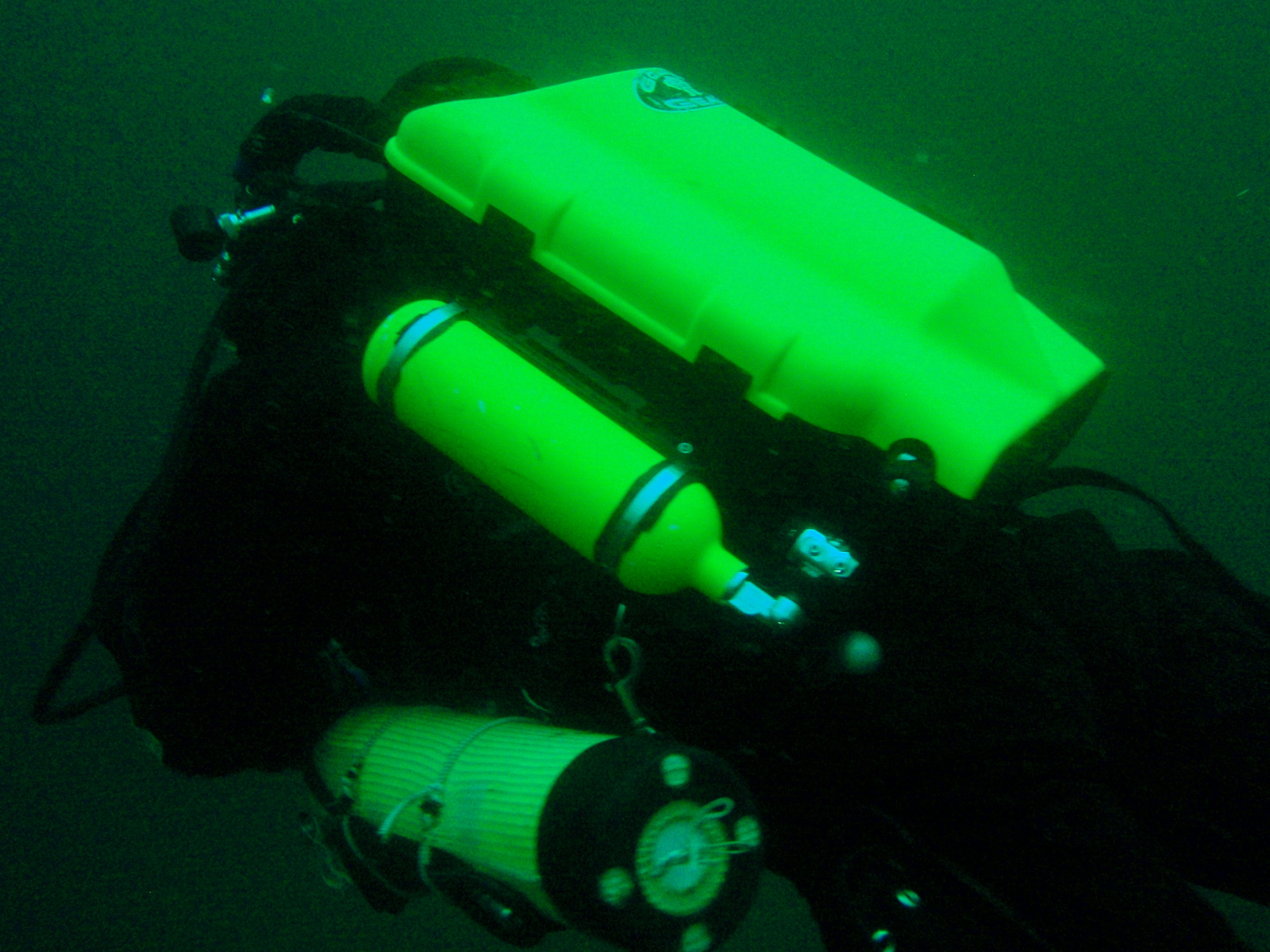
Close up side view of diver using Inspiration electronically controlled closed circuit rebreather

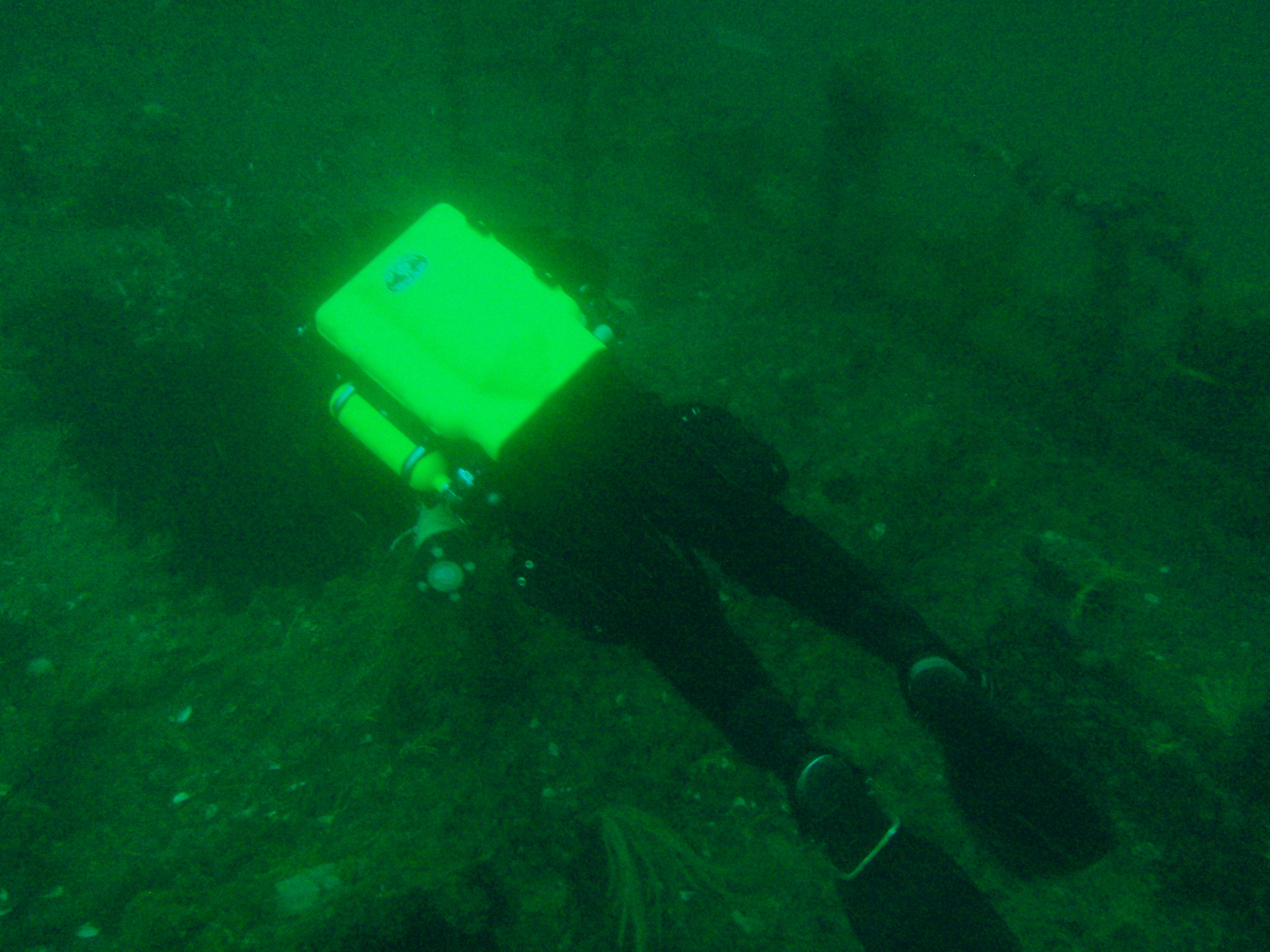
Diver using Inspiration rebreather at the wreck of the MV Orotava

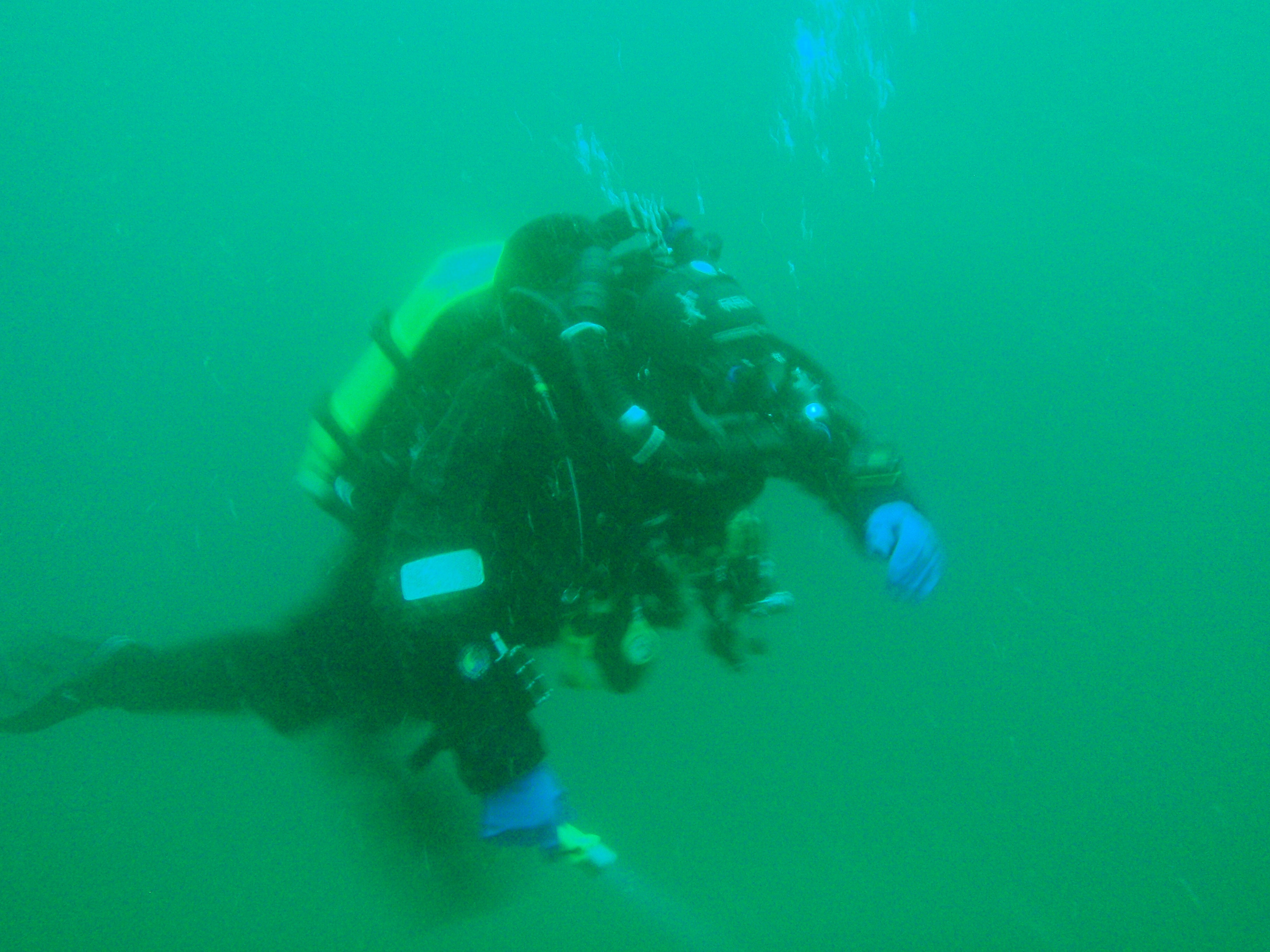
Diver using Inspiration rebreather

The mixed gas closed circuit rebreather can provide an optimised gas mixture for any given depth and duration, and does this with great precision and efficiency of gas usage until it fails, and there are several ways it can fail. Many of the failure modes are not easily identified by the diver without the use of sensors and alarms, and several failure modes can reduce the gas mixture to one unsuitable for supporting life. This problem can be managed by monitoring the state of the system and taking appropriate action when it diverges from the intended state. The composition of the loop gas is inherently unstable, so a control system with feedback is required. Oxygen partial pressure, which is the characteristic to be controlled, must be measured and the value provided to the control system for corrective action. The control system may be the diver or an electronic circuit. The measuring sensors are susceptible to failure for various reasons, so more than one is required, so that if one fails without warning, the diver can use the other(s) to make a controlled termination of the dive.

===== Manually controlled CCR =====
The manually controlled closed circuit rebreather (MCCCR or MCCR) relies on the attention, knowledge and skill of the diver to maintain the gas mixture at the desired composition. It relies on electrochemical sensors and electronic monitoring instruments to provide the diver with the information required to make the necessary decisions and take the correct actions to control the gas mixture. The diver is required to be aware of the status of the system at all times, which increases task loading, but along with the experience, the diver develops and retains the skills of keeping the mixture within planned limits, and is well equipped to manage minor failures. The diver remains aware of the need to constantly check the status of the equipment, as this is necessary to stay alive.

===== Electronically controlled CCR =====
The electronically controlled closed circuit rebreather (ECCCR or ECCR) uses electronic circuitry to monitor the status of the loop gas in real time, and to make adjustments to keep it within narrow tolerances. It is generally very effective at this function until something goes wrong. When something does go wrong the system should notify the diver of the fault so that appropriate action can be taken. Two critical malfunctions may occur which may not be noticed by the diver.

- A dangerously low oxygen partial pressure (Hypoxia) will not be noticed by the diver, but if there are functioning oxygen sensors, they will usually pick this up.
- A dangerously high oxygen partial pressure is more likely to be missed, as defective sensors may still work for low concentrations, but provide inaccurate results for high partial pressures.

An insidious problem with oxygen sensor failure is when a sensor indicates a low oxygen partial pressure which is actually not low, but a sensor failure. If the diver or the control system respond to this by adding oxygen, a hyperoxic gas can be caused which may result in convulsions. To avoid this, multiple sensors are fitted to ECCCRs, so that a single cell failure does not have fatal consequences. Three or four cells are used for systems which use voting logic.

A control circuit may fail in complex ways. If extensive testing of failure modes is not done, the user can not know what might happen if the circuit fails, and some failures may produce unexpected consequences. A failure which does not alert the user to the correct problem may have fatal consequences.

ECCCR alarm systems may include flashing displays on handsets, flashing LEDs on head-up displays, audible alarms and vibratory alarms.

=== Failure modes ===
Several failure modes are common to most types of diving rebreather, and others can occur only when the specific technology is used in the rebreather.

==== Scrubber failure ====
There are several ways that the scrubber may fail or become less efficient:

- The scrubber canister has been incorrectly packed or configured allowing the exhaled gas to bypass the absorbent.
  - The absorbent must be packed tightly so that all exhaled gas comes into close contact with the granules, and the loop is designed to avoid any spaces or gaps between the absorbent and the canister walls that would let gas bypass contact with the absorbent. If the absorbent is packed loosely it can settle, and in some cases this may allow an air path to form through or around the absorbent, known as "tunnelling" or "channelling" .
  - If any of the seals, such as O-rings, or spacers that prevent bypassing of the scrubber, are not cleaned or lubricated or fitted properly, gas may bypass the scrubber, or water may get into the circuit. Some rebreathers may be assembled without all the components essential for ensuring that the breathing gas passes through the scrubber, or without the absorbent, and with no way of visually checking after assembly.
- Exhaustion of the active ingredient ("breakthrough"). When there is insufficient active ingredient left to remove the carbon dioxide at the same rate that it is produced while the gas passes through the scrubber, the concentration will begin to build up in the loop. This occurs when the reaction front reaches the far end of the absorbent. This will occur in any scrubber if used for too long.
- Partial, temporary, or conditional breakthrough:
  - If dwell time is insufficient, not all of the carbon dioxide will be removed during the pass through the scrubber. This may result in a moderate increase in carbon dioxide partial pressure in the inhaled gas, which may be tolerable, but will probably increase with time as the absorbent capacity is consumed.
  - When the gas mix is under pressure caused by depth, the closer proximity of the constituent molecules reduces the freedom of the carbon dioxide molecules to move around to reach the absorbent. In deeper diving, the scrubber needs to be bigger than is needed for a shallow-water or industrial oxygen rebreather, to provide longer dwell time, because of this effect.
  - At low temperatures the scrubber reaction will be slower, and may not remove enough carbon dioxide if the dwell time is too short. Dwell time is a function of flow velocity, therefore breathing rate, which is largely dependent on the level of exertion by the diver, and the consequent metabolic production of carbon dioxide. A combination of heavy work and low temperature may cause partial breakthrough in a scrubber that would function adequately at higher temperature and lower exertion, and this effect will increase as the absorbent is used up.
- In below-freezing environments, wet scrubber chemicals can freeze when the rebreather is not being used, thus preventing carbon dioxide from reaching the scrubber material until warmed up.
- Scrubber flooding can cause a "caustic cocktail" – Carbon dioxide absorbent materials are caustic and can cause burns to the eyes and skin. A caustic cocktail is a mixture of water and absorbent that occurs when the scrubber floods. It produces a watery liquid with a chalky taste, which should prompt the diver to switch to an alternative source of breathing gas and rinse his or her mouth out with water. Many modern diving rebreather absorbents are designed not to produce "cocktail" if they get wet. Excess water in the absorbent can also increase the resistance to gas flow through the breathing loop, raising the work of breathing.
- Excessive flow resistance through the breathing loop can depress the rate of breathing sufficiently to cause carbon dioxide buildup due to inadequate respiration when the required work of breathing exceeds the capacity of the diver. This is affected by gas density, loop geometry, and flow resistance in the scrubber cartridge. The scrubber may adequately remove carbon dioxide, but flow rate may be restricted so much that the diver cannot effectively circulate the breathing gas through the loop for the available effort. Whether this is technically a failure of the scrubber design, the selection of absorbent material, the selection of breathing gas, or of the rebreather as a system is open to interpretation.

Consequences: The failure to remove carbon dioxide from the breathing gas results in a buildup of carbon dioxide leading to hypercapnia. This may occur gradually, over several minutes, with enough warning to the diver to bail out, or may happen in seconds, often associated with a sudden increase in depth which proportionately increases the partial pressure of the carbon dioxide, and when this happens the onset of symptoms may be so sudden and extreme that the diver is unable to control their breathing sufficiently to close and remove the DSV and swap it for a bailout regulator. This problem can be mitigated by using a bailout valve built into the rebreather mouthpiece which allows switch-over between the loop and open circuit without taking the mouthpiece out.

Prevention:

- An indicating dye in the soda lime which changes the colour of the soda lime after the active ingredient is consumed may be used. For example, a rebreather absorbent called "Protosorb" supplied by Siebe Gorman had a red dye, which was said to go white when the absorbent was exhausted. Colour indicating dye was removed from US Navy fleet use in 1996 when it was suspected of releasing chemicals into the circuit. With a transparent canister, this may be able to show the position of the reaction front. This is useful in dry open environments, but is not useful on diving equipment, where:
  - Opening the canister to look inside would flood it with water.
  - The canister is usually out of sight of the user, e.g. inside the breathing bag or inside a backpack box, or just behind the diver.
- Temperature monitoring. As the reaction between carbon dioxide and soda lime is exothermic, temperature sensors along the length of the scrubber can be used to measure the position of the reaction front and therefore the projected life of the scrubber. This is limited by measuring only along the line of sensors, it cannot detect bypasses or channelling.
- Testing of scrubber duration limits by the manufacturer or certification authority, and specified duration limits for the unit for recommended absorbents. These limits will be conservative for most divers based on reasonably predictable levels of exertion.
- Diver training. Divers are trained to plan and monitor the exposure time of the absorbent in the scrubber and replace it within the recommended time limit. The diver must monitor the exposure of the scrubber and replace it when necessary.
- Pre-dive checks. "Prebreathing" the unit before a dive should be done for long enough to ensure that the scrubber is removing carbon dioxide, and that the concentration is not continuously rising. This test relies on the sensitivity of the diver to detect a raised concentration of carbon dioxide, which is known to be unreliable.
- Carbon dioxide gas sensors exist, such systems are not useful as a tool for monitoring scrubber life when underwater as the onset of scrubber breakthrough generally occurs quite rapidly. Such systems should be used as an essential safety device to warn divers to bail off the loop immediately.
- Scrubbers can be designed and built so that the whole reaction front does not reach the end of the canister at one time, but gradually, so that the increase of carbon dioxide concentration is gradual, and the diver gets some warning and is able to bail out before the effects are too severe.

Mitigation: The appropriate procedure for breakthrough or other scrubber failure is bailout, as there is nothing that can be done to correct the problem underwater. Scrubber breakthrough results in carbon dioxide toxicity (hypercarbia), which generally produces symptoms of a powerful, even desperate, urge to breathe. If the diver does not bail out to a breathing gas with low carbon dioxide fairly quickly, the urge to breathe may prevent removal of the mouthpiece even for the short time required to make the switch. A bailout valve integrated into the dive/surface valve or connected to the full-face mask reduces this difficulty.

==== Oxygen monitoring failure ====
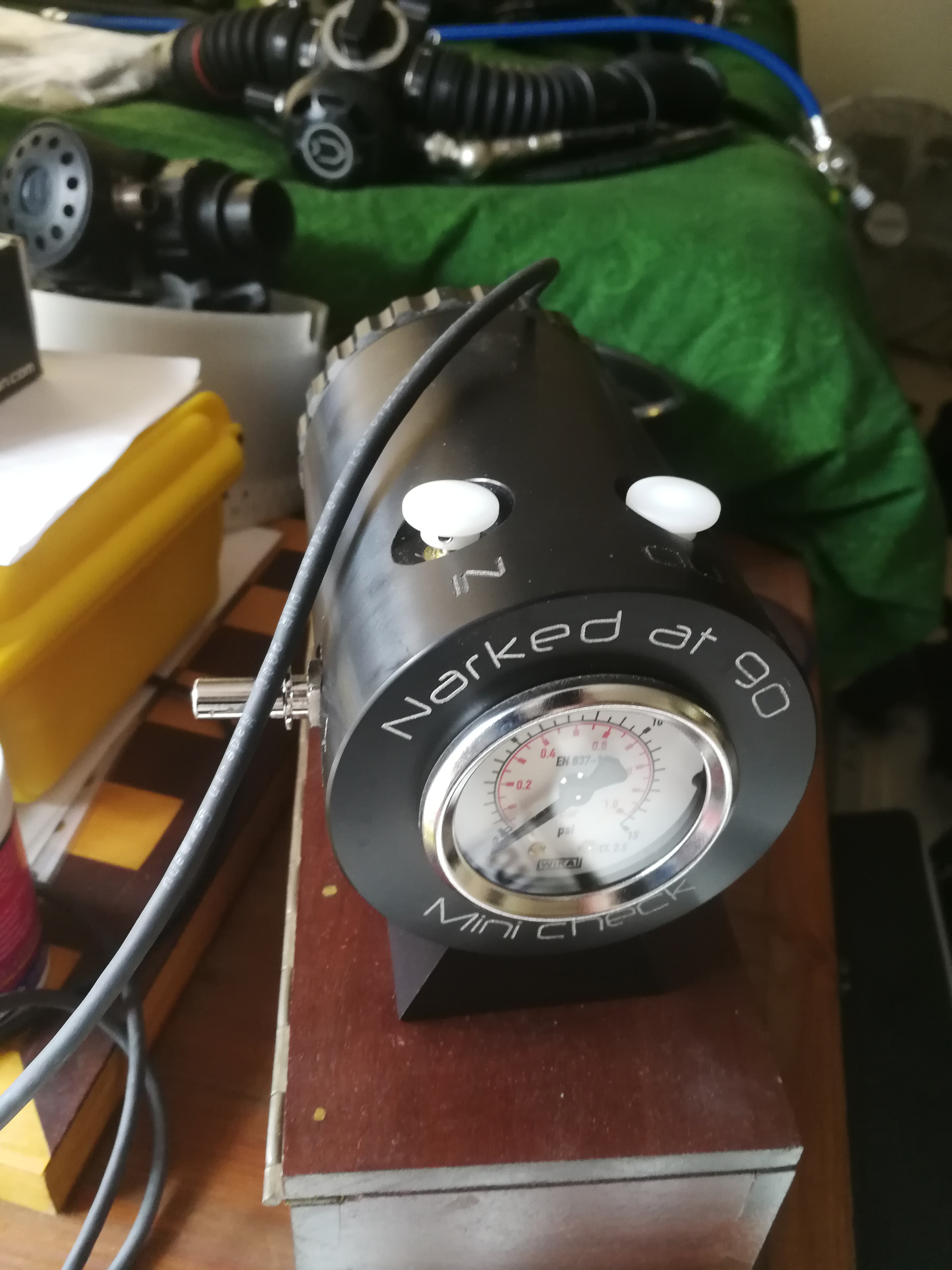
Hyperbaric oxygen cell testing pot for testing cells at high oxygen partial pressure. This can identify cells which are starting to fail.

Partial pressure monitoring of oxygen in the breathing circuit is generally done by electrochemical cells, which are sensitive to water on the cell and in the circuitry. They are also subject to gradual failure due to using up the reactive materials, and may lose sensitivity in cold conditions. Any of the failure modes may lead to inaccurate readings, without any obvious warning. Cells should be tested at the highest available oxygen partial pressure, and should be replaced after a use period and shelf life recommended by the manufacturer.

Prevention: Multiple oxygen sensors with independent circuitry reduce the risk of losing information on oxygen partial pressure. An electronically controlled CCR generally uses a minimum of three oxygen monitors to ensure that if one fails, it will be able to identify the failed cell with reasonable reliability. Use of oxygen sensor cells with different ages or histories reduces the risk of all failing at the same time, and testing the cells before a dive at oxygen partial pressure above the alarm value is likely to identify cells that are close to failing.

Mitigation: If oxygen monitoring fails, the diver can not be sure that the contents of a mixed gas CCR rebreather will sustain consciousness. Bailout is the only safe option. Oxygen monitoring is generally an optional facility on a SCR, but may be part of real time decompression calculations. Appropriate action will depend on circumstances, but this is not an immediately life-threatening event.

===== Managing cell failure in an electronic rebreather control system =====
If more than one statistically independent oxygen sensor cell is used, it is unlikely that more than one will fail at a time. If one assumes that only one cell will fail, then comparing three or more outputs which have been calibrated at two points is likely to pick up the cell which has failed by assuming that any two cells that produce the same output are correct and the one which produces a different output is defective. This assumption is usually correct in practice, particularly if there is some difference in the history of the cells involved. The concept of comparing the output from three cells at the same place in the loop and controlling the gas mixture based on the average output of the two with the most similar output at any given time is known as voting logic, and is more reliable than control based on a single cell. If the third cell output deviates sufficiently from the other two, an alarm indicates probable cell failure. If this occurs before the dive, the rebreather is deemed unsafe and should not be used. If it occurs during a dive, it indicates an unreliable control system, and the dive should be aborted. Continuing a dive using a rebreather with a failed cell alarm significantly increases the risk of a fatal loop control failure. This system is not totally reliable. There has been at least one case reported where two cells failed similarly and the control system voted out the remaining good cell.

If the probability of failure of each cell was statistically independent of the others, and each cell alone was sufficient to allow safe function of the rebreather, the use of three fully redundant cells in parallel would reduce risk of failure by five or six orders of magnitude.

The voting logic changes this considerably. A majority of cells must not fail for safe function of the unit. In order to decide whether a cell is functioning correctly, it must be compared with an expected output. This is done by comparing it against the outputs of other cells. In the case of two cells, if the outputs differ, then one at least must be wrong, but it is not known which one. In such a case the diver should assume the unit is unsafe and bail out to open circuit. With three cells, if they all differ within an accepted tolerance, they may all be deemed functional. If two differ within tolerance, and the third does not, the two within tolerance may be deemed functional, and the third faulty. If none are within tolerance of each other, they may all be faulty, and if one is not, there is no way of identifying it.

Using this logic, the improvement in reliability gained by use of voting logic where at least two sensors must function for the system to function is greatly reduced compared to the fully redundant version. Improvements are only in the order of one to two orders of magnitude. This would be great improvement over the single sensor, but the analysis above has assumed statistical independence of the failure of the sensors, which is generally not realistic.

Factors which make the cell outputs in a rebreather statistically dependent include:

- Common calibration gas – They are all calibrated together in the pre-dive check using the same diluent and oxygen supply.
- Sensors are often from the same manufacturing batch – Components, materials and processes are likely to be very similar.
- Sensors are often installed together and have since been exposed to the same $P_{O_2}$ and temperature profile over the subsequent time.
- Common working environment, particularly with regards to temperature and relative humidity, as they are usually mounted in very close proximity in the loop, to ensure that they measure similar gas.
- Common measurement systems
- Common firmware for processing the signals

This statistical dependency can be minimised and mitigated by:

- Using sensors from different manufacturers or batches, so that no two are from the same batch
- Changing sensors at different times, so they each have a different history
- Ensuring that the calibration gases are correct
- Adding a statistically independent $P_{O_2}$ measuring system to the loop at a different place, using a different model sensor, and using different electronics and software to process the signal.
- Calibrating this sensor using a different gas source to the others

An alternative method of providing redundancy in the control system is to recalibrate the sensors periodically during the dive by exposing them to a flow of either diluent or oxygen or both at different times, and using the output to check whether the cell is reacting appropriately to the known gas at the known depth. This method has the added advantage of allowing calibration at a higher oxygen partial pressure than 1 bar. This procedure may be done automatically, where the system has been designed to do it, or the diver can manually perform a diluent flush at any depth at which the diluent is breathable to compare the cell $P_{O_2}$ readings against a known $F_{O_2}$ and absolute pressure to verify the displayed values. This test does not only validate the cell. If the sensor does not display the expected value, it is possible that the oxygen sensor, the pressure sensor (depth), or the gas mixture $F_{O_2}$, or any combination of these may be faulty. As all three of these possible faults could be life-threatening, the test is quite powerful.

==== Gas injection control circuit failure ====
If the control circuit for oxygen injection fails, the usual mode of failure results in the oxygen injection valves being closed. Unless action is taken, the breathing gas will become hypoxic with potentially fatal consequences. An alternative mode of failure is one in which the injection valves are kept open, resulting in an increasingly hyperoxic gas mix in the loop, which may pose the danger of oxygen toxicity.

Prevention: Two basic approaches are possible. Either a redundant independent control system may be used, or the risk of the single system failing may be accepted, and the diver takes the responsibility for manual gas mixture control in the event of failure.

Mitigation: Most (possibly all) electronically controlled CCRs have manual injection override. If the electronic injection fails, the user can take manual control of the gas mixture provided that the oxygen monitoring is still reliably functioning. Alarms are usually provided to warn the diver of failure.

==== Loop flood ====
The breathing resistance of a loop may more than triple if the scrubber material is flooded. The absorption of carbon dioxide by the scrubber requires a certain amount of humidity for the reaction, but an excess will degrade absorption and may lead to accelerated breakthrough.

Prevention: Predive leak checks and careful assembly are the key to avoiding leaks through connections and detecting damage. The negative pressure test is most important for this purpose. This test requires that the breathing loop maintains a pressure slightly below ambient for a few minutes to indicate that the seals will prevent leakage into the loop. Care in using the dive/surface valve will prevent flooding through the mouthpiece. This valve should always be closed when the mouthpiece is out of the mouth underwater.

Mitigation: The diver will usually be made aware of flooding by increased breathing resistance, water noise, or carbon dioxide buildup, and sometimes by buoyancy loss. A caustic cocktail is usually a sign of a fairly extensive flood and is only likely if there are a lot of small particles in the scrubber material, or a relatively soluble absorbent material is used. Some rebreathers have water traps to prevent water entering through the mouthpiece from getting as far as the scrubber, and in some cases there are mechanisms to remove water from the loop while diving. Some scrubbers are virtually unaffected by water, either due to the type of absorbent medium, or due to a protective membrane. If all else fails, and the loop is flooded beyond safe functionality, the diver can bail out to open circuit.

==== Gas leakage ====
A well assembled rebreather in good condition should not leak gas from the breathing circuit into the environment except that which is required by functional considerations, such as venting during ascent, or to compensate for, or control, the addition of gas in a semi-closed rebreather.

Prevention: Pre-use preparation of the rebreather includes checking of seals and post-assembly leak checks. The positive pressure test checks that the assembled unit can maintain a slight internal positive pressure for a short period, which is an indication that gas does not leak out of the loop. Inspection and replacement of soft components should detect damage before component failure.

Mitigation: Minor gas leakage is not in itself a serious problem, but it is often a sign of damage or incorrect assembly that may later develop into a more serious problem. Manufacturer's operating manuals generally require the user to identify the cause of any leak and rectify it before using the equipment. Leaks which develop during a dive will be assessed by the dive team for cause and risk, but there is not often much that can be done about them in the water. Minor leaks may be tolerated, or the dive may be turned, depending on severity and the circumstances of the dive. A major leak may require bailout.

==== CMF orifice blockage ====
A blockage to the constant mass flow orifice is one of the more hazardous failures of this type of semi-closed rebreather, as it will restrict the feed gas supply and may lead to a hypoxic loop gas with a high risk of the diver losing consciousness and either drowning or dry asphyxiation..

Prevention: Inspection and flow testing of the CMF orifice before each dive or on each diving day will ensure that the orifice does not clog from corrosion, and an upstream microfilter to trap particles large enough to block the orifice will greatly reduce the risk of blockage during a dive by foreign matter in the gas supply. Some rebreathers use two orifices as this will usually ensure that at least one remains functional, and the gas is less likely to become fatally hypoxic.

Mitigation: If the oxygen content is monitored and the diver identifies a problem with feed gas delivery, it may be possible to manually add gas, or induce triggering of the automatic diluent valve by exhaling to the environment through the nose and thereby artificially reducing the volume of gas in the loop. The forced addition of gas will bring up the oxygen content, but the dive should be terminated as this problem can not be rectified during the dive. This hazard is the strongest argument for oxygen partial pressure monitoring in a CMF SCR.

=== Risk ===
The percentage of deaths that involve the use of a rebreather among US and Canadian residents increased from approximately 1 to 5% of the total diving fatalities collected by the Divers Alert Network from 1998 through 2004. Investigations into rebreather deaths focus on three main areas: medical, equipment, and procedural.

Divers Alert Network (DAN) report 80 to 100 fatal accidents per 500,000 to 1 million active scuba divers in the US, per year. British Sub-Aqua Club (BSAC) and DAN open-circuit accident rates are very similar, although BSAC dives have a higher proportion of deep and decompression dives.

An analysis of 164 fatal rebreather accidents documented from 1994 to February 2010 by Deep Life, reports a fatal accident rate of one in 243 per year, using a conservative assumption of linear growth of rebreather use and an average of around 2500 active participants over that time. This is a fatal accident rate of over 100 times that of open circuit scuba. The statistics indicate that equipment choice has a dramatic effect on dive safety.

A further analysis of these rebreather deaths found significant inaccuracies in the original data. Review shows that the risk of death while diving on a rebreather is in the region of 5.33 deaths per 100,000 dives, roughly 10 times the risk of open circuit scuba or horseriding, five times the risk of skydiving or hang gliding, but one eighth the risk of base jumping. No significant difference was found when comparing MCCRs with ECCRs or between brands of rebreather since 2005, but accurate information on numbers of active rebreather divers and number of units sold by each manufacturer are not available. The survey also concluded that much of the increased mortality associated with CCR use may be related to use at greater than average depth for recreational diving, and to high-risk behaviour by the users, and that the greater complexity of CCRs makes them more prone to equipment failure than OC equipment.

EN 14143 (2009) (Respiratory equipment – Self-contained re-breathing diving apparatus [Authority: The European Union Per Directive 89/686/EEC]) requires that manufacturers perform a Failure mode, effects, and criticality analysis (FMECA), but there is no requirement to publish the results, consequently most manufacturers keep their FMECA report confidential. EN 14143 also requires compliance with EN 61508. According to the Deep Life report this is not implemented by most rebreather manufacturers, with the following implications:

- no existing rebreather has been shown to be able to tolerate any one worst case failure.
- users have no information on the safety of the equipment they use.
- the public can not examine the conclusions of FMECA and challenge dubious conclusions.
- there is no public FMECA data which can be used to develop better systems.

Analysis of probability failure trees for open circuit scuba shows that use of a parallel or redundant system reduces risk considerably more than improving the reliability of components in a single critical system. These risk modelling techniques were applied to CCRs, and indicated a risk of equipment failure some 23 times that for a manifolded twin cylinder open circuit set. When sufficient redundant breathing gas supply in the form of open circuit scuba is available, the mechanical failure risk of the combination becomes comparable to that for open circuit. This does not compensate for poor maintenance and inadequate pre-dive checks, high risk behavior, or for incorrect response to failures. Human error appears to be a major contributor to accidents.

There are no formal statistics on underwater electronics failure rates, but it is likely that human error is more frequent than the error rate of electronic dive computers, which are the basic component of rebreather control electronics, which process information from multiple sources and have an algorithm for controlling the oxygen injection solenoid. The sealed dive computer package has been around for long enough for the better quality models to have become reliable and robust in design and construction.

An electronically controlled rebreather is a complex system. The control unit receives input from several sensors, evaluates the data, calculates the appropriate next action or actions, updates the system status and displays, and performs the actions, in some cases using real-time feedback to adapt the control signal. The inputs include one or more of pressure, oxygen and temperature sensors, a clock, and possibly helium and carbon dioxide sensors. There is also a battery power source, and a user interface in the form of a visual display, and possibly audio and vibratory alarms.

In a minimal eCCR the system is very vulnerable. A single critical fault can necessitate manual procedures for fault recovery or the need to bail out to an alternative breathing gas supply. Some faults may have fatal consequences if not noticed and managed very quickly. Critical failures include power supply, non-redundant oxygen sensor, solenoid or control unit.

The mechanical components are relatively robust and reliable and tend to degrade non-catastrophically, and are bulky and heavy, so the electronic sensors and control systems have been the components where improved fault tolerance has generally been sought. Oxygen cell failures have been a particular problem, with predictably serious consequences, so the use of multiple redundancy in oxygen partial pressure monitoring has been an important area of development for improving reliability. A problem in this regard is the cost and relatively short lifespan of oxygen sensors, along with their relatively unpredictable failure, and sensitivity to the environment.

To combine cell redundancy with monitoring circuit, control circuit and display redundancy, the cell signals should all be available to all monitoring and control circuits in normal conditions. This can be done by sharing signals at the analog or digital stage – the cell output voltage can be supplied to the input of all monitoring units, or the voltages of some cells can be supplied to each monitor, and the processed digital signals shared. The sharing of digital signals may allow easier isolation of defective components if short circuits occur. The minimum number of cells in this architecture is two per monitoring unit, with two monitoring units for redundancy, which is more than the minimum three for basic voting logic capability.

The three aspects of a fault tolerant rebreather are hardware redundancy, robust software and a fault detection system. The software is complex and comprises several modules with their own tasks, such as oxygen partial pressure measurement, ambient pressure measurement, Oxygen injection control, decompression status calculation and the user interface of status and information display and user inputs. It is possible to separate the user interface hardware from the control and monitoring unit, in a way that allows the control system to continue to operate if the relatively vulnerable user interface is compromised.

Diver's Alert Network found that the actual cause of death determined by a medical examiner was drowning in 94% of recreational/technical rebreather fatalities. A military rebreather accident study found that drowning following loss of consciousness only occurred in 5.5% of cases. This much lower incidence of drowning has largely been attributed to safety protocols which include the use of a mouthpiece retaining strap (MRS) to secure the airway. There may have been other significant contributory differences in the circumstances of the incidents, such as the proximity of a buddy, the decompression status of the divers and the distance to the surface.

=== Mitigation ===
A variety of options have been developed to reduce the risk of, and mitigate rebreather emergencies, which can be classified as equipment and procedural options.

==== Equipment options ====
Mouthpiece retaining straps: These are intended to prevent the mouthpiece falling out of the diver's mouth if they lose consciousness, thereby reducing the risk of drowning. The Rebreather Training Council issued a safety guidance note recommending the use of mouthpiece retaining straps. A mouthpiece retaining strap is also a mandatory design feature for rebreathers sold in the EU and UK, following European rebreather standard EN14143:2013. The arrangement is required to be adjustable or self adjusting, and to hold the mouthpiece firmly and comfortably in the user's mouth, and to minimise ingress of water if a diver has a convulsion or loses consciousness underwater.

Full-face masks: These provide a more secure airway than mouthpiece retaining straps, but may require special arrangements for bailout.

Bailout valves: A bailout valve that allows the diver to bai out to open circuit without removing the mouthpiece reduces the risks in a hypercapnic event, as the mouthpiece does not have to be removed to switch to open circuit, which is quick and eliminates the chance of inhaling while the airway is unprotected. This can be supplied from onboard diluent of offboard bailout cylinder, but the gas supply must be suitable for the depth. Like the mouthpiece, the BOV should be held securely by a mouthpiece retaining strap, unless mounted to a full-face mask. If provided with a quick connector, a rescuer cn connect a suitable gas for an unconscious diver while the mouthpiece remains in place, however, quick connections are a flow restriction that will decrease the performance of the open circuit demand valve, and should be tested to make sure they perform adequately at the maximum depth intended by the user. A bailout valve is also of great value in a hypercapnic incident where the diver may be unable or unwilling to shut off the DSV and insert a separate bailout demand valve, while the carbon dioxide levels are high. This is a real problem, and once in the hypercapnic feedback loop the desperate need to breathe continuously and rapidly may make it impossible to recover. A diluent flush might be enough in some cases to get carbon dioxide low enough to be able to switch.

Carbon dioxide monitoring: Two basic methods of detecting or monitoring carbon dioxide in the breathing loop are available as of 2024. Neither is entirely satisfactory. The temperature stich monitors the advance of the reaction front in the scrubber, but only on the line of the sensors, which is not necessarily the line at which breakthrough will occur. The other method is to use electronic sensors to measure carbon dioxide partial pressure at a point in the loop. One problem with this technology is that the sensors are also sensitive to water, and can give false positives. another problem is that the carbon dioxide in the loop is not always an accurate indication of hypercapnia, as the scrubbed gas can be within specification, but the diver may be building up high levels of carbon dioxide due to high work of breathing. Measuring end of exhalation peak carbon dioxide, which would catch this problem, is not yet (2023) available.

Alarms: Audible, visual, and tactile alarms may be available. Usually the default is visual alrm with the options of audible buzzers and sometimes tactile vibrators. Sometimes a head-up display is available, and sometimes a head up display positioned for visibility for the buddy is available.

==== Procedural options ====
Checklists: To some extent electronic checklists are becoming an integral part of eCCR startup procedure, but they are still external to a significant part of pre-dive preparation. When using a checklist, it is important that each of the checks is verified. For example, to check that a gas supply valve has been opened, it is not sufficient to merely check gauge pressure, as this will register even if the valve was subsequently closed. Operating a valve that releases pressure will indicate whether the pressure drops of remains constant with some gas loss.

=== Statistics ===
Statistics collected and analysed by DAN suggest that rebreather diving fatalities have averaged around 20-25 per year over the period from 2013 to 2023, which is slightly higher than the previous period, but there are also more rebreather divers doing more rebreather dives. 1400 to 2300 certifications per year are estimated, and the rebreather manufacturing industry has grown considerably, though accurate production and sales figures are not available.

Cardiac events, hypoxia, and hyperoxia are the main causes of death where it is known with any confidence, and fatality rates have been estimated at 1.8 to 3.8 deaths per 100,000 dives or 1.2 to 2.5 deaths per 100,000 diving hours on rebreathers.

The data are limited, and assumed to be underreported, particularly from Asia.

== Standard operating procedures ==
The procedures needed to use a given model of rebreather are usually detailed in the operating manual and training program for that rebreather, but there are several generic procedures which are common to all or most types.

=== Assembly and predive function tests ===
Before use, the scrubber canister must be filled with the correct amount of absorbent material, and the unit tested for leaks. Two leak tests are usually conducted. These are generally known as the positive and negative pressure tests, and test that the breathing loop is airtight for internal pressure slightly lower and higher than the outside. The positive pressure test checks that the unit will not lose gas while in use, and the negative pressure test ensures that water will not leak into the breathing loop where it can degrade the scrubber medium or the oxygen sensors.

A test and calibration of the oxygen sensors is part of the pre-dive or daily checks for rebreathers which use them. Electronically controlled rebreathers may have an automatic sensor check routine which compares the readings from all the cells using the diluent and pure oxygen as calibration gases. Calibration is therefore usually limited to an oxygen partial pressure of 1 bar, which is not optimal since the set points are usually more than 1 bar. To calibrate at more than one bar a special cell calibration chamber is needed, which can preferably test and calibrate the cells at 1.6 to 2 bar in pure oxygen.

Prebreathing the unit (usually for about 3 minutes) shortly before entering the water is a standard procedure. This ensures that the scrubber material gets a chance to warm up to operating temperature, and works correctly, and that the partial pressure of oxygen in a closed-circuit rebreather is controlled correctly. Prebreathing has been found to be unreliable for checking scrubber function.

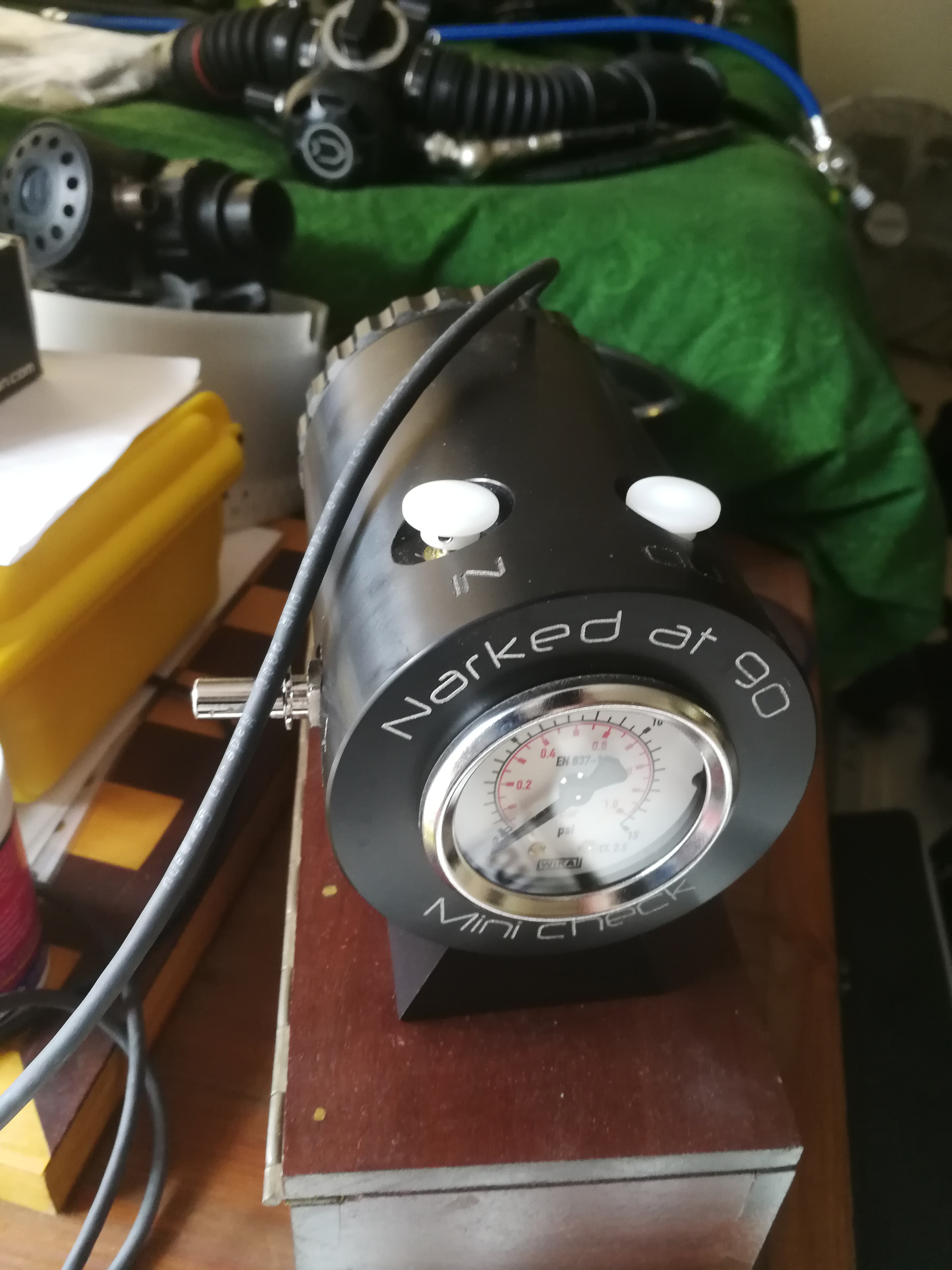
Hyperbaric oxygen cell testing pot

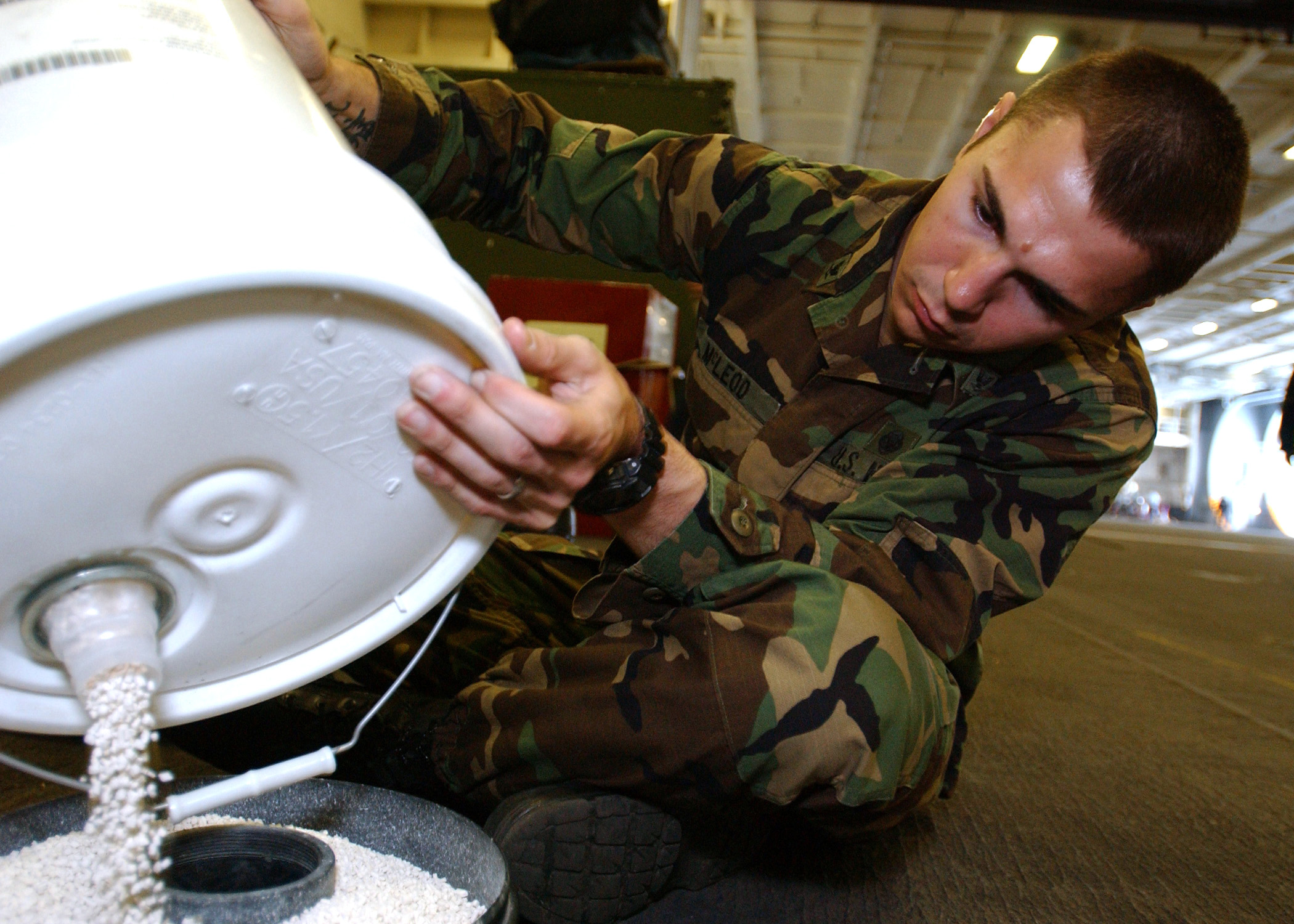
Preparing for use – filling the scrubber canister with sodalime

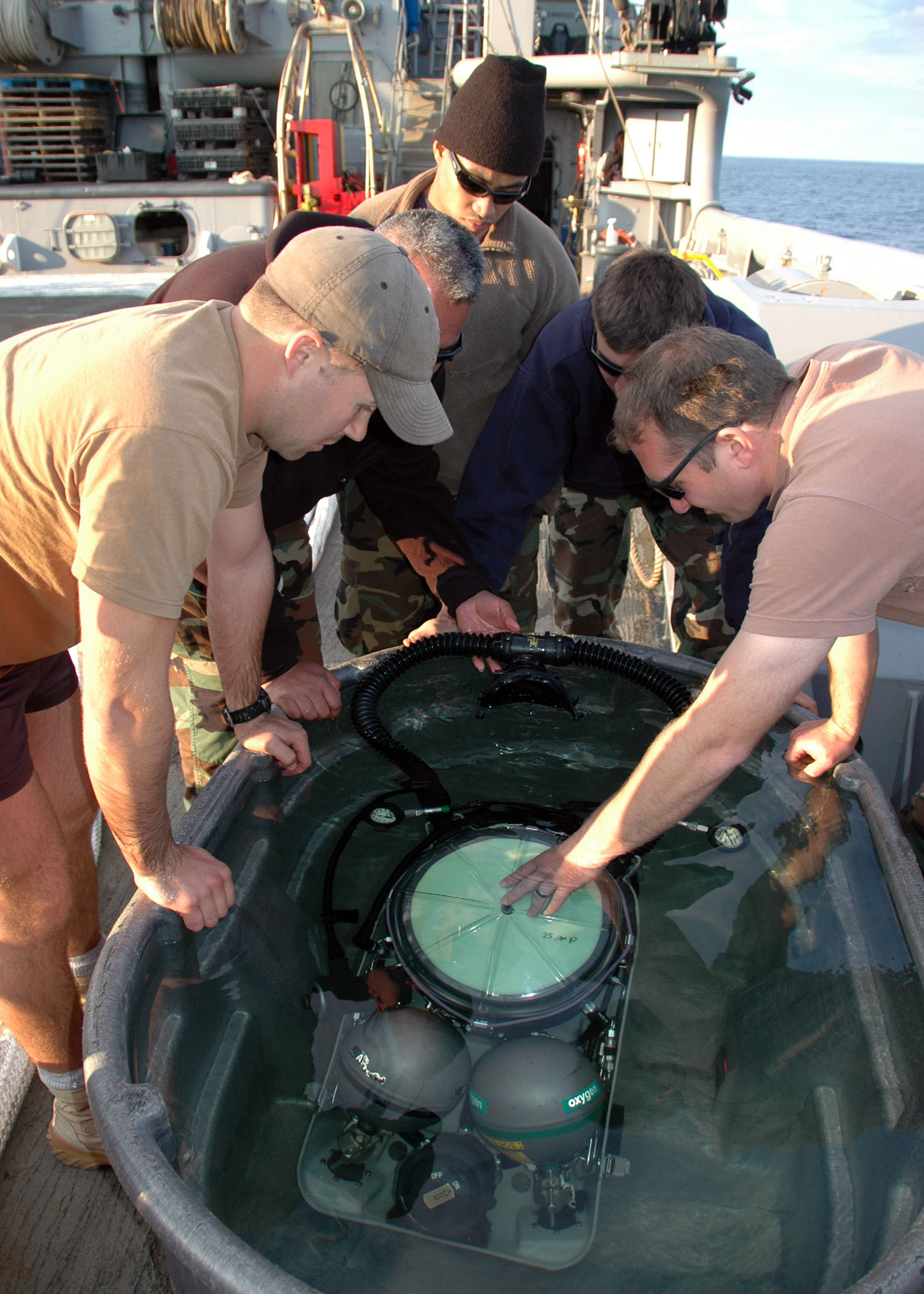
Immersion leak test on a Mk16

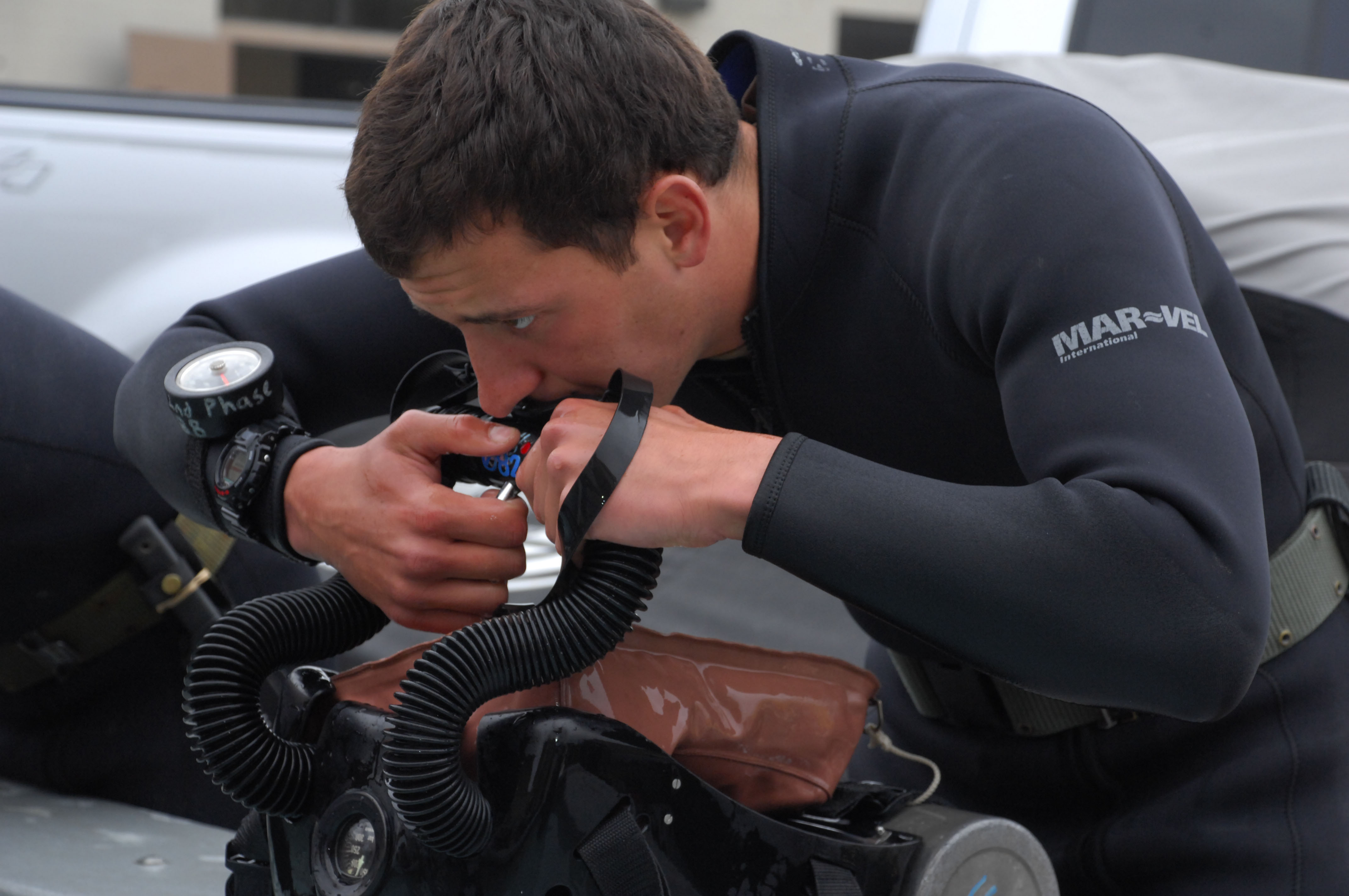
Predive positive pressure test

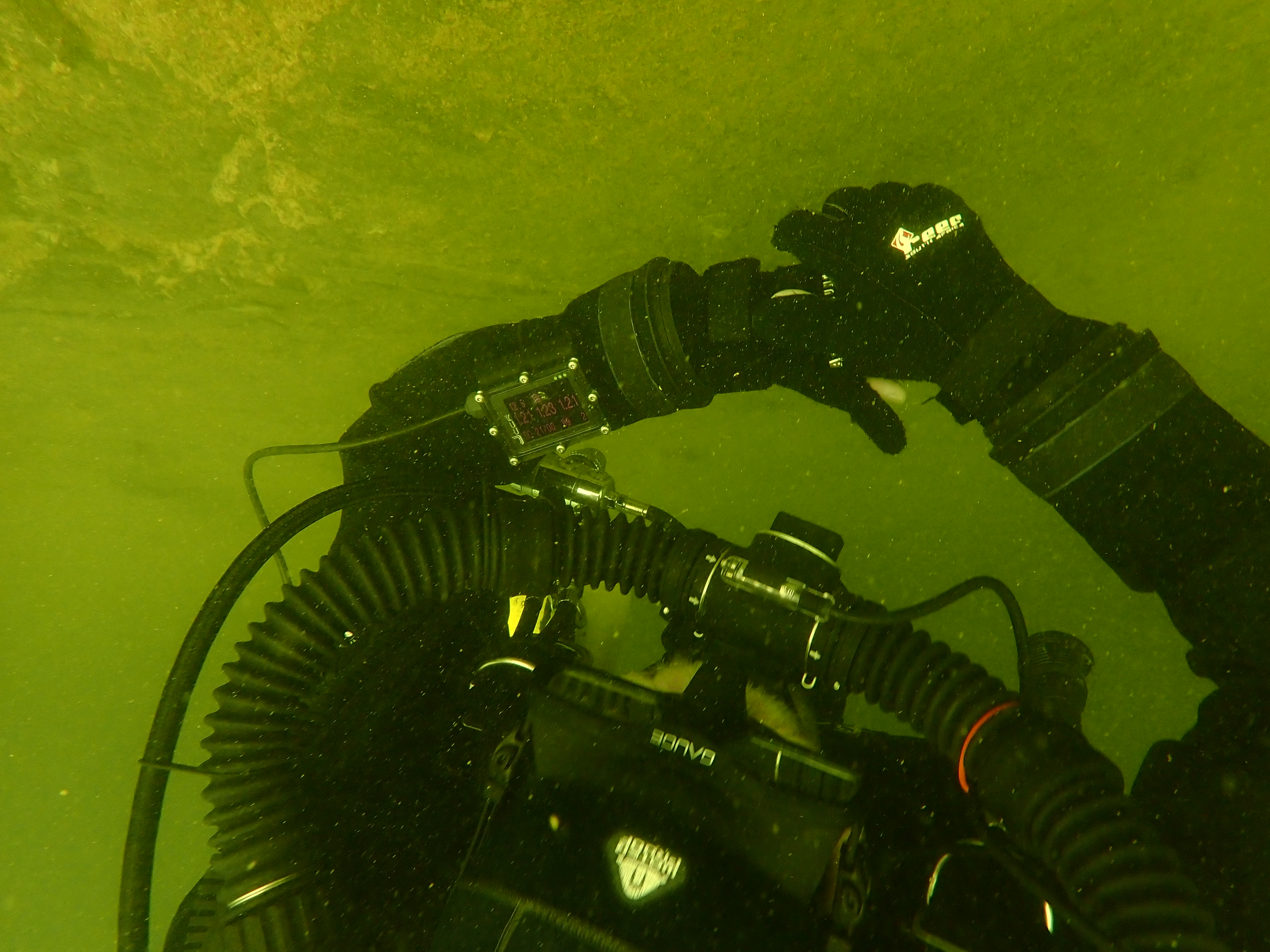
The diver is provided with information on the status of the breathing gas in the loop on the wrist mounted display and sometimes also on a head-up display as can be seen on the mouthpiece of this JJ electronically controlled closed circuit rebreather.

=== Preventing flooding of the loop ===
Before the mouthpiece is removed from the mouth the dive/surface valve must be closed (or the bailout valve activated) to prevent water from flooding into the loop. This must be reversed when the mouthpiece is replaced. Operating the DSV or BOV is usually a one-hand operation when the mouthpiece is held by the teeth, but usually requires both hands if it is not in the mouth. There are no automated DSVs, only the diver can prevent flooding.

=== Oxygen monitoring ===
Partial pressure of oxygen is of critical importance on CCRs and is monitored at frequent intervals, particularly at the start of the dive, during descent, where transient increases due to compression may occur, and during ascent, where the risk of hypoxia is highest. On electronically controlled CCRs this is done by the control system, and the diver is warned of divergence from the set point by an alarm. The diver may need to manually adjust the mixture or decrease the rate of depth change to help the injection system to correct the mix.

=== Monitoring carbon dioxide ===
Carbon dioxide buildup is also a severe hazard, and most rebreathers do not have electronic carbon dioxide monitoring, and where available, it is not entirely reliable. The diver must look out for indications of this problem at all times. A buddy diver should stay with a rebreather diver who is required to take emergency action until the diver has safely surfaced, as this is the time when the buddy is most likely to be needed.

=== Diluent flush ===
A "diluent flush", or "flushing the loop" procedure is a way to temporarily restore the gas mix in the loop to a known fraction of oxygen, which is known to be safe provided that the diluent is safe to breathe at the current depth. It allows the diver to compare oxygen cell readings with a known calculated partial pressure. The procedure involves simultaneously venting the loop and injecting diluent. This flushes out the old mixture and replaces it with fresh gas with a known fraction of oxygen. A diluent flush will also temporarily reduce carbon dioxide in the loop, but not for long if the scrubber is not working correctly.

=== Venting the loop ===
This procedure releases gas from inside the loop to the surroundings. This is necessary to reduce pressure in the loop when ascending, and excess gas will usually be automatically released by a spring-loaded overpressure valve. Sometimes it is useful to reduce volume in the loop while it is not full, as when doing a diluent flush. There are two standard methods for dumping gas from the loop when it is not full – manually opening the dump valve, and exhaling through the nose when using a half mask. Gas will also escape from the loop if the mouthpiece is removed without closing the DSV, but this can cause the loop to flood, which is a serious malfunction.

=== Draining the loop ===
Regardless of whether the rebreather in question has the facility to trap any ingress of water, training on a rebreather will feature procedures for removing excess water. The method will depend on specific design of the unit, as there are a variety of places in the loop where water will accumulate which depend on the details of the loop architecture and on where the water makes ingress. Mostly these procedures will deal with water that gets in through the mouthpiece, as that is a common problem.

=== Ascents and descents ===
During a descent the gas in the loop is compressed by the increasing ambient over pressure, and the partial pressure of oxygen will increase unless diluent is added. The gas may also compress so far that the loop structure would be collapsed unless gas is added. The automatic diluent valve, (ADV) is used to prevent damage, and in most cases will also prevent excess oxygen partial pressure. The risk is low as failure of the ADV is usually very obvious to the diver when loop volume gets low. Reduction in loop volume also reduces buoyancy, which must be corrected along with volume in the buoyancy compensator and, if used, the dry suit.

During an ascent the reduction of ambient pressure will cause the gas in the loop to expand, and excess must be vented to allow normal breathing to continue and prevent rupture of the loop. This may be done by allowing excess gas to vent through the nose, around the mouthpiece, or through an overpressure non-return valve (OPV) fitted to the loop for this purpose. A more serious hazard is the reduction in partial pressure due to the reduction in pressure, and that unless oxygen rich gas is added manually or by the control system, the loop gas may become hypoxic, with a risk of the diver losing consciousness. When the control system of an eCCR is working correctly, it will inject the correct amount of oxygen to avoid the problem, but mCCR divers must do this manually.

In a bailout rebreather, or if the DSV is closed for bailout, the automatic diluent valve and overpressure valve are necessary to prevent damage to the loop during descent and ascent.

=== Buoyancy control ===
Buoyancy control with a rebreather differs from open circuit in two ways. The change in mass of the diver during the dive is smaller, as less gas is used, and the change in buoyancy during a breathing cycle is negligible, so fine buoyancy adjustment by controlling the volume in the lungs does not work. This requires slightly different management techniques, and either the dry suit or buoyancy compensator must be used for buoyancy control.

=== Trim ===
The centre of buoyancy of the lungs and counterlungs must be as close as possible for low work of breathing and good trim, so trim weights are commonly used to set up the rebreather to suit the diver.

=== Post dive checks, cleaning and maintenance ===
- Inspection for signs of wear and damage, replacement of damaged and deteriorated components
- Rinsing with fresh water, draining, drying, and storage in well ventilated, cool, dry environment out of direct sunlight.
- Following the planned maintenance schedule. This may entail servicing by approved agents, and may require shipping to the manufacturer.
- Disposal of spent absorbent material
- Disinfection of the loop.
- Replacement of oxygen sensors.

== Emergency procedures ==
Each possible failure mode has an associated response. Those which are more likely to occur or have serious consequences will have associated emergency procedures that are known to be effective which the diver must learn to be considered properly trained, and must be able to perform reliably under stress to be considered competent. Many of the emergency procedures of rebreather diving are identical to, or similar to, those for open circuit scuba.

=== Bailout ===
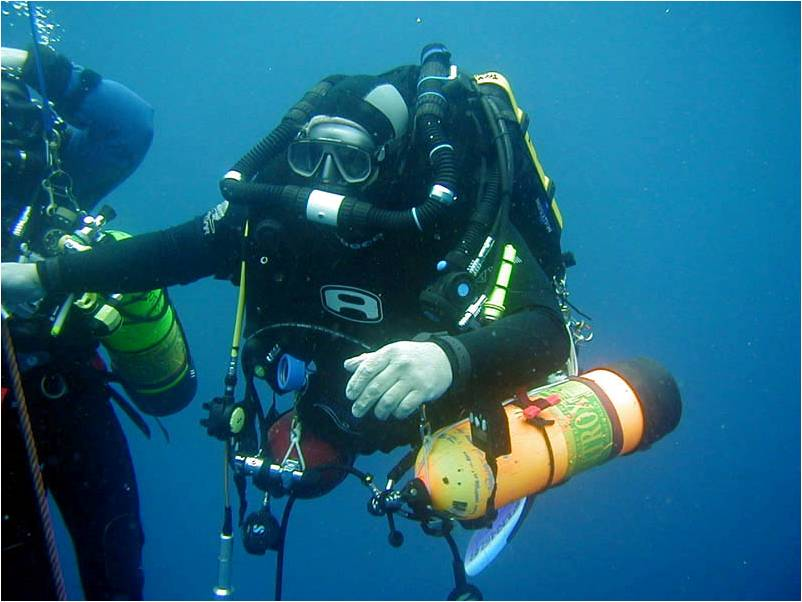
Rebreather diver with bailout and decompression cylinders

While the diver is underwater, the rebreather may fail and be unable to provide a safe breathing mix for the duration of the ascent back to the surface. In this case the diver needs an alternative breathing source: the bailout system.

Although some rebreather divers – referred to as "alpinists" – do not carry bailout equipment, bailout strategy becomes a crucial part of dive planning, particularly for long dives and deeper dives in technical diving. Often the planned dive is limited by the capacity of the bailout set and not the capacity of the rebreather. Circumstances in which bailout is necessary include loop floods, which may involve a caustic cocktail, and scrubber failures for other reasons, resulting in high carbon dioxide levels in the inhalation part of the loop. More than half of the divers in a survey had experienced at least one caustic cocktail, an event that renders the rebreather unfit for further use until it has been cleaned and repacked, and therefore urgently requires bailout.

Several types of bailout are possible:

- An open-circuit demand valve connected to the rebreather's diluent cylinder, known as bailout to diluent or "dilout". While this option can have the advantages of being permanently mounted on the rebreather and not heavy, the quantity of gas held on board the rebreather is usually small so the protection offered is low, though with some rebreathers such as the JJ which can carry larger on-board cylinders, or any rebreather with off-board diluent, the quantity can be viable.
- An open-circuit demand valve connected to the rebreather's oxygen cylinder. This is similar to the open circuit diluent bailout except it can only safely be used in depths of 6 metres (20 ft) or less because of the risk of oxygen toxicity.
- An independent open-circuit system. The extra cylinders are heavy and cumbersome but larger cylinders let the diver carry more gas providing protection for the ascent from deeper and long dives. The breathing gas mix must be carefully chosen to be safe at all depths of the ascent, or more than one set will be necessary. For long penetrations or decompression obligations, it may be necessary to carry multiple open-circuit bailout cylinders to provide enough gas. In such cases the chosen mixtures may be optimised to suit the worst case situation on the planned profile.
- An independent bailout rebreather system.
- A bailout rebreather system connected to the primary rebreather mouthpiece, selected by a bailout valve.

The bailout system used on a specific dive will depend on the dive profile, diver qualification and preferences, code of practice where applicable, and availability of options.

In all cases when bailing out, the rebreather loop should be isolated from the ambient water to avoid flooding and loss of loop gas, which could adversely affect buoyancy. It may also be necessary to close the gas supply valves at the cylinders to prevent a malfunctioning control system or free-flowing ADV from continuing to add gas to the loop, which would also adversely affect buoyancy, possibly making it impracticable for the diver to remain at the correct depth for decompression.

==== Bailout valve ====
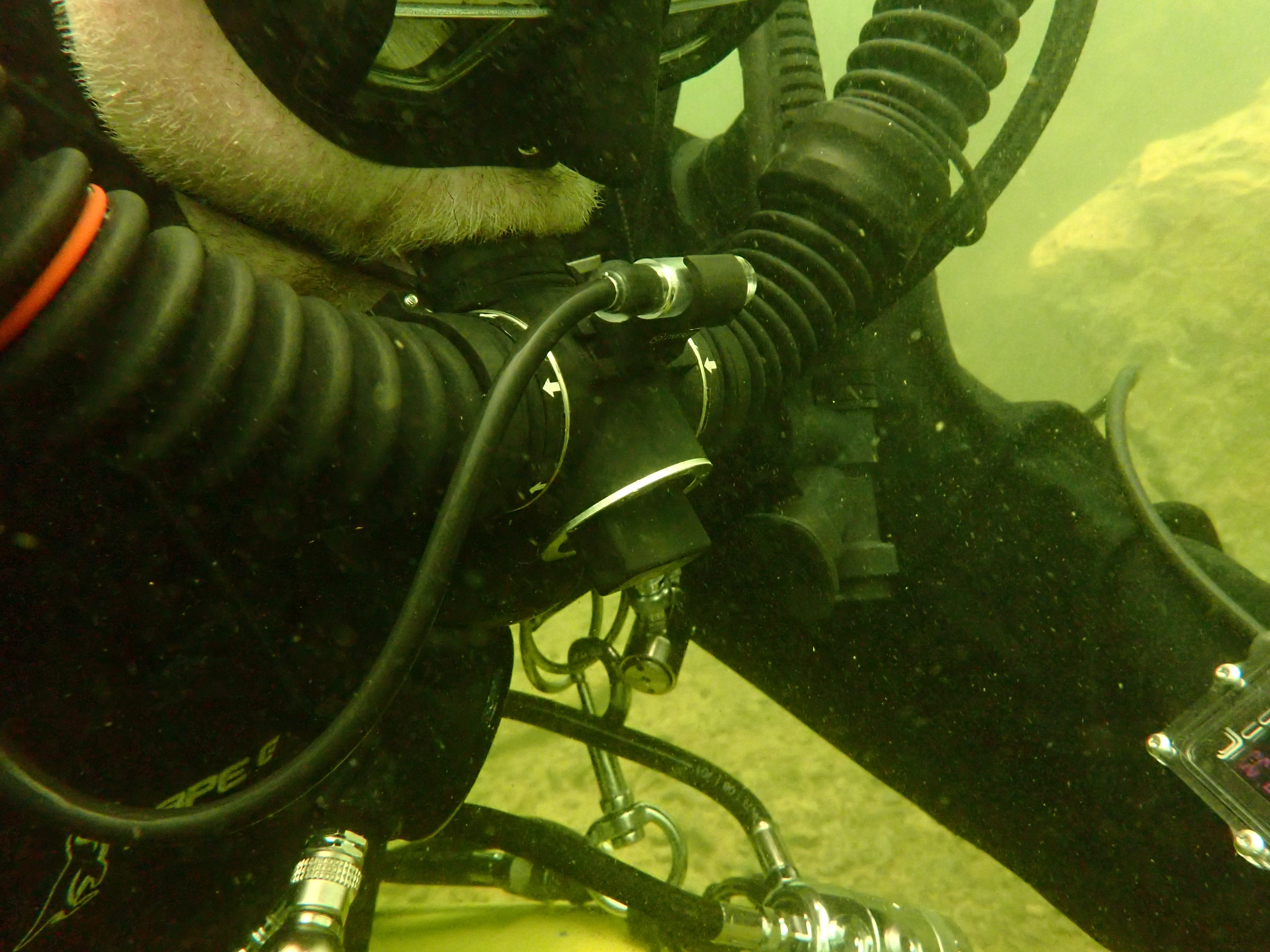
Bailout valve on JJ rebreather

A bailout valve (BOV) is a switch-over valve fitted to the mouthpiece of a rebreather with a manually operated mechanism to switch from primary closed circuit to bailout, which may be an open or closed circuit breathing gas supply carried by the diver.

===== Open circuit bailout valve =====
The bailout valve (BOV) can switch to an open circuit demand valve fitted to the mouthpiece of a rebreather with a manually operated mechanism to switch from closed circuit to open circuit. The position selecting the open circuit demand valve may substitute for the closed state of a dive-surface valve (DSV) as the breathing loop is effectively sealed when on bailout. This type of bailout valve allows the diver to switch from closed circuit to open circuit without the need to change mouthpieces. This can save time in an emergency, as the bailout demand valve is in place for immediate use. This can be important in a situation of severe acute hypercapnia, when the diver physically cannot hold their breath long enough to change mouthpieces. Gas supply to the BOV is often from the on-board diluent cylinder, but arrangements can be made for off-board gas to be plumbed in using quick connectors.

===== Closed circuit bailout valve =====
A bailout valve can alternatively be provided that will switch to a closed circuit bailout system carried by the diver.

==== Bailout to open circuit ====
Bailout to open circuit is generally considered a good option when there is any uncertainty as to what the problem is or whether it can be solved. The procedure for bailout depends on details of the rebreather construction and the bailout equipment chosen by the diver. Several methods may be possible:

- Bailout to open circuit by switching the mouthpiece bailout valve to open circuit. This is easy to do and works well even when the diver is hypercapnic, as there is no need to hold the breath at all. This is a simple procedure and all that needs to be done in most cases is to rotate a valve handle on the mouthpiece assembly by 90°.
- Bailout to open circuit by opening a bailout demand valve already connected to the full face mask, or by nose-breathing in some cases. This also requires no removal of the mouthpiece. It requires a suitable model full-face mask with a secondary port for the demand valve. The procedure requires the supply valve on the open circuit demand valve to be opened, and generally the dive/surface valve of the rebreather to be closed.
- Bailout to open circuit by closing the DSV and exchanging the rebreather mouthpiece for a separate demand valve. This is simple, but requires the diver to hold their breath while switching the mouthpiece, which may not be possible in cases of hypercapnia.

Open circuit bailout is in common use, is relatively simple and straightforward to operate, and is mechanically reliable, but relatively complex to accurately estimate the amount of gas needed for a long and complex dive plan. The logistics of carrying sufficient open-circuit bailout gas for very long or deep dives can be a challenge. Available statistics suggest that very few fatalities are caused by inadequate bailout gas quantities.

===== Team bailout =====
The use of bailout gas distributed amongst team members can be used as a bailout strategy, but it generally only provides for rescue of one diver. Since the probability of a second diver also experiencing a rebreather failure on the same dive is low, this may be considered an acceptable risk by the team. This is a similar situation to recreational divers relying on the buddy for emergency gas in a situation where an immediate safe ascent to the surface is not possible. With this system the diver is never self-sufficient, and if a diver is separated from the group the emergency gas supply for the group is unavailable to all.

==== Bailout to rebreather ====
An alternative to bailout to open circuit is bailout to rebreather, by closing the DSV of the primary rebreather's mouthpiece and switching to the mouthpiece of an independent bailout rebreather set. This is not bailing out to open circuit, but has logistical advantages in dives where the bulk of sufficient open circuit gas to reach the surface may be excessive, and a second rebreather is less bulky. There may be an intermediate stage where the diver bails out to open circuit on diluent gas while preparing the bailout rebreather.

To realise the full potential of closed circuit scuba for extended duration diving, an equivalent bailout system is necessary. Configurations using two back-mount rebreathers, a back-mount and a sidemount, and two sidemount rebreathers have been developed, tested, and found practicable for different situations. Proper and complete preparation and predive testing is essential, as it is not possible to correct some types of error in the water.

It is generally not safe to rely on an immediate switch to a bailout rebreather. It is necessary to check the loop before breathing from it, and there are bailout loop statuses that are extremely dangerous due to inappropriate internal pressure, or oxygen partial pressure. A preliminary bailout to open circuit gives the diver time to make a controlled assessment of the bailout loop status and make any adjustments necessary to make it safe to breathe at the current depth.

While the diver is not using the bailout rebreather they do not have feedback on the internal pressure of the loop, which may be lower or higher than ambient pressure, although the ADV and overpressure dump should automatically correct this if all the valves are set and working correctly, and nothing has been inadvertently or accidentally changed during the dive. It is prudent to check the bailout loop status during descent, occasionally during the bottom sector, and it is necessary to dump excess gas from its loop during ascent. It is critically important to avoid flooding either loop during these checks, by closing the mouthpiece before removing it from the mouth.

The bailout rebreather should be placed so that the work of breathing is acceptable with the diver in the range of positions likely to be needed for the return to the surface. This requires the counterlungs to be at the depth of the diver's chest.

===== Bailout software =====
Some CCR electronic controllers are not compatible with being left running while the loop is not in use, and will try to achieve the set point regardless of whether it is practicable. A rebreather intended for this function can have a bailout setting, which puts the solenoids on standby, but monitors and displays the loop mixture. The effective and safe use of a bailout rebreather requires considerable practice, and presents the diver with a high level of task loading.

===== Bailout rebreather configurations =====
Symmetrical:

- Back mounted primary and bailout: Commonly similar or identical units mounted side-by-side on a common frame. This arrangement allows for simple attachment to a common mouthpiece with integral bailout valve.
- Side mounted primary and bailout. Usually identical units, one carried on each side. Relatively simple, but not easy to combine with a bailout valve on a single mouthpiece.

Asymmetrical:

- Back mounted primary, side mounted bailout
- Back mounted primary, chest mounted bailout

== Training ==
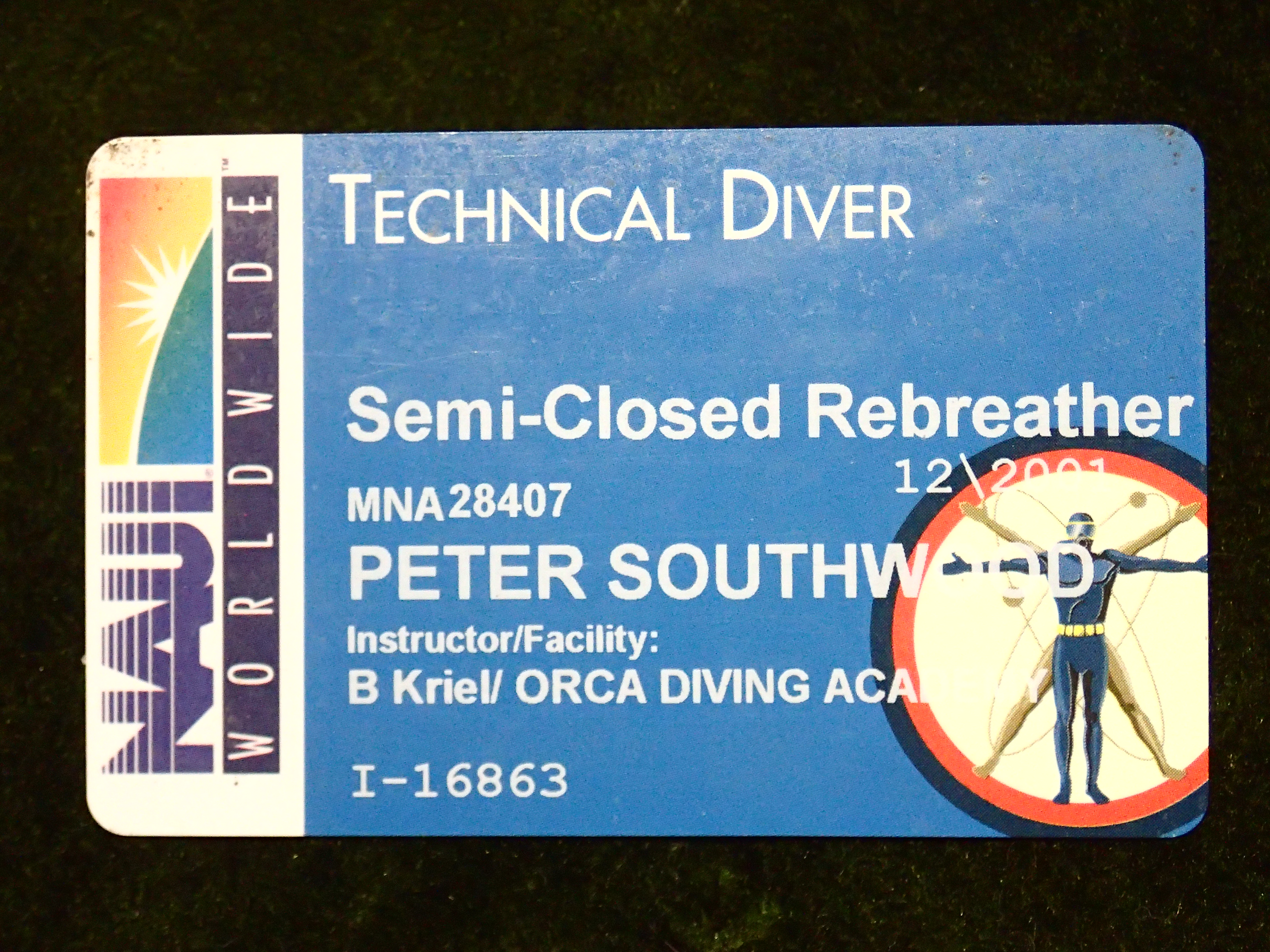
NAUI semi-closed Rebreather certification card

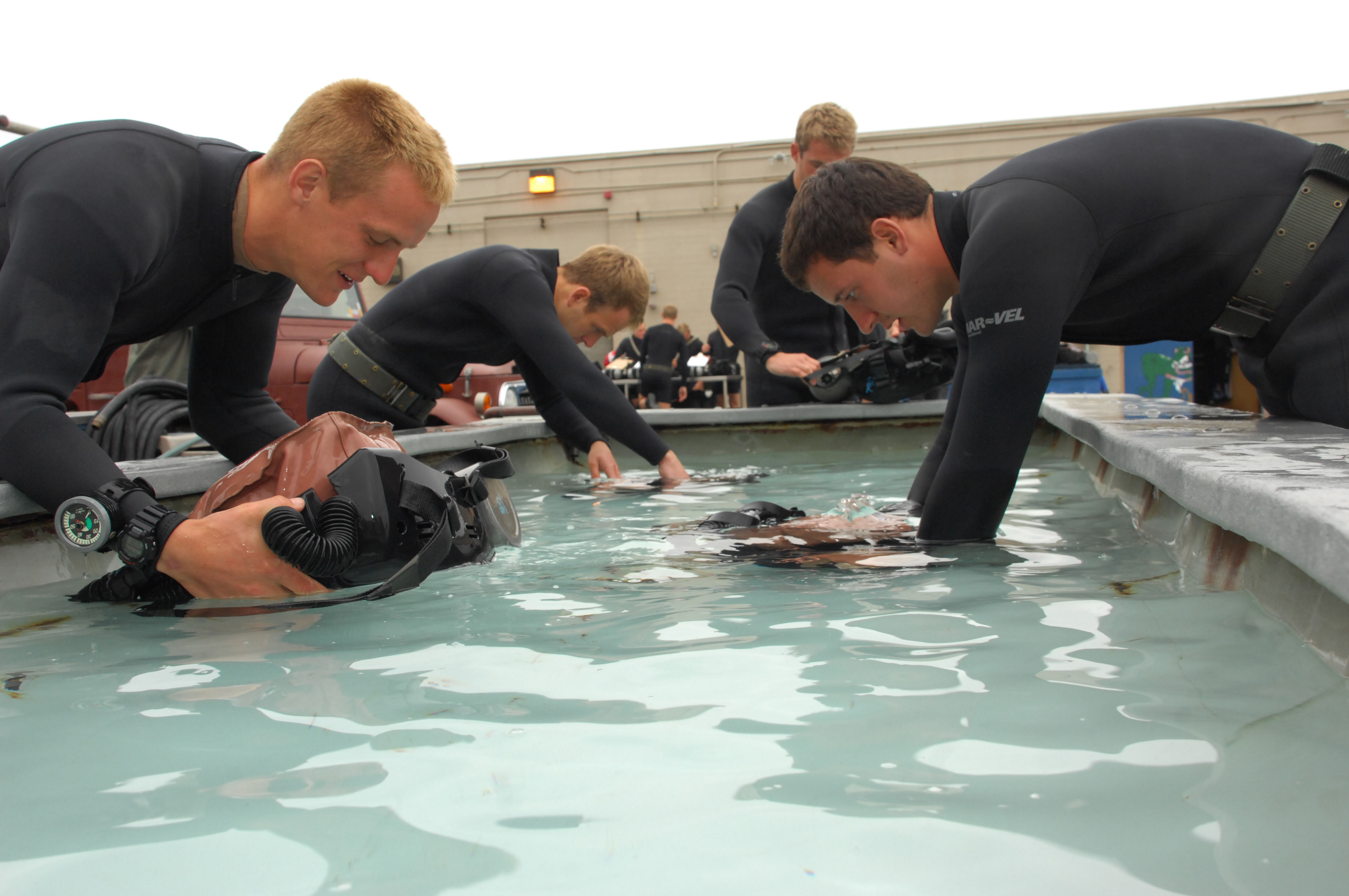
Training includes pre-dive equipment tests.

Training in the use of rebreathers has two components: Generic training for the class of rebreather, including the theory of operation and the general procedures, and specific training for the model of rebreather, which covers the details of preparation, testing, user maintenance and troubleshooting, and those details of normal operating and emergency procedures which are specific to the model of rebreather. Crossover training from one model to another generally only requires the second aspect if the equipment is similar in design and operation.

Military organisations usually only use a small number of models. Typically an oxygen rebreather for attack swimmers, and a mixed gas rebreather for clearance diving work, and this simplifies the training and logistical requirements.

Rebreather diving for recreational purposes is generally classed as technical diving, and the training is provided by the technical diver certification agencies. Training of scientific divers on rebreathers is usually done by these same technical diver training agencies as the use of rebreathers by the scientific diving community is usually insufficient to justify separate in-house training.

Recreational and scientific diving applications draw on a far wider range of models, and any given technical diving training agency may issue certification for an arbitrary number of rebreathers depending on the skills of their registered instructors. Most recreational rebreather manufacturers require that training on their equipment is based on training originating from the manufacturer, i.e., the instructor trainers are typically certified by the manufacturer.

A consensus recommendation of the Rebreathers and Scientific Diving Workshop of February 2015 was that scientific rebreather divers should maintain currency in rebreather diving by a minimum annual activity of 12 dives with a minimum dive time of 12 hours, and that this might be insufficient for some activities. They also recommended that diver training should include management of an unresponsive rebreather diver.

As of 2023 there are several major new developments in equipment for which stable training has not yet been developed. Sidemount rebreathers are in a relatively advanced state compared to chest mount CCR, and particularly bailout rebreather procedures, which are still developing relatively fast, making it difficult to develop training standards.

=== Scientific diver training ===
As of 2016 there were three sets of rebreather standards for scientific diving in the US, those of the American Academy of Underwater Sciences (AAUS), National Park Service (NPS) and National Oceanic and Atmospheric Administration (NOAA).

All three organisations require full scientific diver status with nitrox certification as prerequisite, NOAA requires certification to 130 feet (40 m) and 100 open water dive, while AAUS and NPS require 100 feet (30 m) and 50 open water dives. Each agency specifies stepwise certification to increasing depths, and certification is valid only for the rebreather type trained on, for environmental conditions similar to those during training. Classroom training includes theory review of topics included in open circuit training, and decompression and dive planning appropriate to the chosen unit. More technical topics include system design and operation, pre-dive setup and testing, post-dive break down and maintenance, oxygen exposure and decompression management, dive operations planning, problem recognition and management specific to the chosen unit. Practical skills training includes system calibration and operation checks, preparation and management of absorbent canisters, breathing loop assembly, non-return valve function and pressure checks, gas analysis, pre-breathing function assessment, buoyancy control, system monitoring during the dive, bailout procedures, and system user maintenance, and experience exposure by way of minimum hours of underwater time under supervised conditions.

The wreck of a Phoenician ship off the coast of Malta at a depth of about 110 metres (360 ft) has been partially excavated by divers using rebreather equipment, using techniques developed for the purpose to make the most effective use of time on site, which was restricted to 3 shifts of 12 minute each per day on site.

=== Rebreather Training Council ===
The Rebreather Training Council is an organisation with members from recreational/technical diver training agencies which train rebreather divers. Their function is to write training standards that ensure that there is reasonable consistency across the agencies so that divers get enough training to ensure an acceptable level of risk when diving within the guidelines of the training standard, and that there is mutual recognition of these standards between training agencies. They coordinate with the Rebreather Education and Safety Association (RESA) via the Combined Rebreather Industry Standards Alignment Group (CRISAG) so that the rebreather manufacturers and training agencies can both provide the necessary input to produce effective training standards. They also liaise directly with Working Group 1 – Diving Services of ISO Technical Committee 228 (Tourism and related services) to produce the training standards.

=== Rebreather Education and Safety Association ===
The Rebreather Education and Safety Association (RESA) is a non-profit organisation mainly comprising rebreather manufacturers, but other organisations such as training agencies can be supporting members.

RESA was created to help improve safety and education in the rebreather industry. Regular (voting) members are manufacturers of rebreathers or significant subsystems.

=== ISO training standards ===
The ISO training standards are published by the International Organization for Standardization, and are minimum standards. A diver training agenciy can follow the standard as long as all the requirements are met, and can add as much additional course material as they see fit. Gas density limits are specified for training, with a preferred value of 5.2g/L and a maximum of 6.3g/L. These limits also effectively address narcotic limits.

- ISO 24804 "Recreational Diving Services – Requirements for recreational rebreather diver training – No-decompression diving"
- ISO 24805 "Recreational Diving Services – Requirements for recreational rebreather diver training – Decompression diving to 45m"
- ISO 24806 "Recreational Diving Services – Requirements for recreational rebreather diver training – Decompression diving to 60m"
- ISO 24807 "Recreational Diving Services – Requirements for recreational rebreather diver training – Decompression diving to 100m"
  This does not limit divers to a maximum depth of 100m, but the training is not required to go below 100m.
- ISO 24808 "Recreational Diving Services – Requirements for recreational rebreather instructor training"
  There are four parts within this standard addressing the levels of instructor certification for training each of the diver levels.

EUF Certification International is an independent body for global verification of rebreather training agencies based in Europe and associated with the Austrian Standards organisation. Agencies are certified for five years between renewals.

The adoption of the ISO standards will not have a very large impact on training course content, as most agencies already included most of the required content, but some agencies will have to adjust the number of dives and depths required for the specific courses.

== History ==
=== Early developments ===
The first commercially practical scuba rebreather was designed and built by the diving engineer Henry Fleuss in 1878, while working for Siebe Gorman in London. His self contained breathing apparatus consisted of a rubber mask connected to a breathing bag, with an estimated 50–60% oxygen supplied from a copper tank and carbon dioxide scrubbed by passing it through a bundle of rope yarn soaked in a solution of caustic potash, the system giving a dive duration of up to about three hours. Fleuss tested his device in 1879 by spending an hour submerged in a water tank, then one week later by diving to a depth of 5.5 metres (18 ft) in open water, on which occasion he was slightly injured when his assistants abruptly pulled him to the surface. This apparatus was first used under operational conditions in 1880 by Alexander Lambert, the lead diver on the Severn Tunnel construction project, who was able to travel 1,000 feet (300 m) in the darkness to close several submerged sluice doors in the tunnel; this had defeated the best efforts of standard divers due to extremely long distance, along which their air supply hoses became fouled on submerged debris, and the strong water currents in the workings.

Fleuss continually improved his apparatus, adding a demand regulator and tanks capable of holding greater amounts of oxygen at higher pressure. Sir Robert Davis, head of Siebe Gorman, improved the oxygen rebreather in 1910 with his invention of the Davis Submerged Escape Apparatus, the first rebreather to be made in quantity. While intended primarily as an emergency escape apparatus for submarine crews, it was soon also used for diving, being a handy shallow water diving apparatus with a thirty-minute endurance, and as an industrial breathing set.

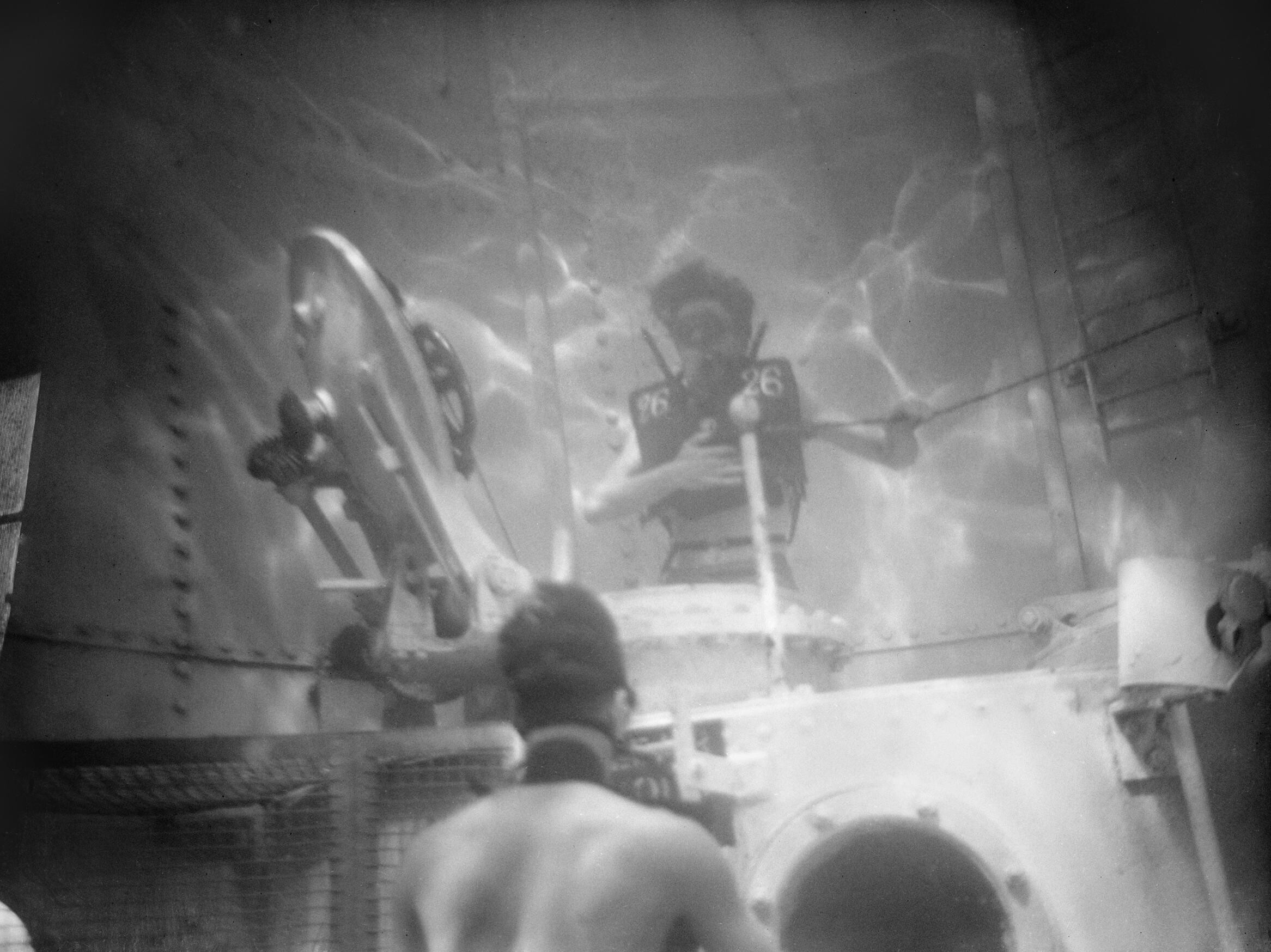
Davis Submerged Escape Apparatus being tested at the submarine escape test tank at HMS Dolphin, Gosport, 14 December 1942

The rig comprised a rubber breathing/buoyancy bag containing a canister of barium hydroxide to absorb exhaled carbon dioxide and, in a pocket at the lower end of the bag, a steel pressure cylinder holding approximately 56 litres (2.0 cu ft) of oxygen at a pressure of 120 bars (1,700 psi) which was equipped with a control valve and connected to the breathing bag. Opening the cylinder's valve admitted oxygen to the bag at ambient pressure. The rig also included an emergency buoyancy bag on its front to help keep the wearer afloat. After further development by Davis in 1927 the DSEA was adopted by the Royal Navy.

In 1911 Dräger of Lübeck tested a self-contained semi-closed rebreather system for standard diving equipment, which used an injector system to circulate the breathing gas through the scrubber and breathing loop, which included the full interior of the helmet. This was put into service soon thereafter and was available in two versions, an oxygen rebreather DM20 for depths shallower than 20 m, and a nitrox rebreather DM40 for depths up to 40 m. It was possible to minimise the work of breathing and use a helmet without a mouthpiece because the gas was pneumatically circulated. The US Navy developed a variant of the Mark V system for heliox diving. These were successfully used during the rescue of the crew and salvage of the USS Squalus in 1939. The US Navy Mark V Mod 1 heliox mixed gas helmet is based on the standard Mark V Helmet, with a scrubber canister mounted on the back of the helmet and an inlet gas injection system which recirculates the breathing gas through the scrubber to remove carbon dioxide and thereby conserve helium. The gas supply at the diver was controlled by two valves. The "Hoke valve" controlled flow through the injector to the "aspirator" which circulated gas from the helmet through the scrubber, and the main control valve used for bailout to open circuit, flushing the helmet, and for extra gas when working hard or descending. Flow rate of the injector nozzle was nominally 0.5 cubic foot per minute at 100 psi above ambient pressure, which would blow 11 times the volume of the injected gas through the scrubber.

=== World War II era ===
During the 1930s and all through World War II, the British, Italians and Germans developed and extensively used oxygen rebreathers to equip the first frogmen. The British adapted the Davis Submerged Escape Apparatus and the Germans adapted the Dräger submarine escape rebreathers, for their frogmen during the war. The Italians developed similar rebreathers for the combat swimmers of the Decima Flottiglia MAS, especially the Pirelli ARO. In the U.S. Major Christian J. Lambertsen invented an underwater free-swimming oxygen rebreather in 1939, which was accepted by the Office of Strategic Services. In 1952 he patented a modification of his apparatus, this time named SCUBA, (an acronym for "self-contained underwater breathing apparatus"), which later became the generic English word for autonomous breathing equipment for diving, and later for the activity using the equipment. After World War II, military frogmen continued to use rebreathers since they do not make bubbles which would give away the presence of the divers. The high percentage of oxygen used by these early rebreather systems limited the depth at which they could be used due to the risk of convulsions caused by acute oxygen toxicity.

=== Technical diving era ===
In the early days of technical diving (roughly the late 1980s and early 1990s) there was considerable interest in mixed gas rebreather technology, as it appeared to offer significantly extended bottom times, which in closed circuit systems, could be largely independent of depth. It also seemed useful for minimising decompression obligation and optimising decompression, though at the time the full complexity of achieving acceptably safe systems and procedures was not yet apparent, and the required technology was not yet readily available. The technical diving magazine aquaCorps first reported on rebreathers in their second issue in June 1990, and the topic was covered in most subsequent issues, including an entire issue in January 1993.

In May 1994 the first Rebreather Forum was held in Key West, Florida, organised by Michael Menduno and Tracy Robinette, with guests including Dr Edward D. Thalmann, the US Navy diving physiology researcher, and developer of the US Navy's mixed-gas decompression tables, and inventor Alan Krasberg, who had done significant development work on closed-circuit mixed-gas rebreathers. The 90 attendees included five rebreather manufacturers, several training agencies, and representatives from recreational, military, and commercial-diving communities. The forum recognised that there was a market for recreational rebreathers but no supply. The only community successfully using rebreathers at the time was the military, and their success depended on disciplined use and very good technical support. Commercial diving had rejected them as too complex and unreliable. It was also clear that training requirements for rebreather diving would be more complex than for open circuit, that semi-closed rebreathers would probably be easier to bring into the recreational diving market because of relative simplicity and lower cost, and that unlike the initial reaction to nitrox, there did not appear to be great concern that the technology was inappropriate for recreational diving – PADI technical development director Karl Shreeves indicated that when the technology was ready PADI would provide training. Despite continued rebreather workshops and try-dives at further annual conferences, actual rebreather availability was slow to materialise.

Dräger introduced a semi-closed circuit rebreather designed for recreational divers called the Atlantis in 1995. The company had accumulated experience in rebreather design and manufacturing going back to 1912, and was a major manufacturer of military rebreathers, which helped with credibility. In Japan, Grand Bleu marketed another recreational semi-closed unit called the Fieno.

Rebreather Forum 2.0 was held in Redondo Beach, California, in September 1996, and the proceedings were published by the PADI subsidiary Diving Science and Technology (DSAT). At this time Dräger reported that it had sold about 850 Atlantis semi-closed rebreathers, and it was estimated that up to 3000 Fienos may have been sold in Japan. The British and US navies were at the time the largest users of mixed gas rebreathers, with an estimated 240 units in service. Somewhere in the order of 25 to 50 mixed gas units were estimated to be in use by the technical diving community, mostly by exploration teams and film-makers. The forum identified widespread interest in recreational rebreathers, and recognised that there were complex risks. At this stage there was no standardised training, and agencies were advised to work with manufacturers to develop effective responses to failure modes, and instructors were advised to own, or have access to, the models on which they were planning to provide training.

At this time only the US Navy 0.7atm constant PO_{2} decompression tables had been validated for nitrox and heliox, and it was not clear whether reprogramming the existing algorithms to use the PO_{2} provided by the rebreathers would be effective. Some recommendations published by the forum included third party testing for quality assurance, the use of full-face masks or mouthpiece retaining straps, adherence to the buddy system, and a maximum PO_{2} setpoint of 1.3 atm. It was also recognised that the development and use of on-board CO_{2} monitors, which were not available at the time, would contribute to improved safety.

In 1996 Cis-Lunar Development Labs was selling its MK-IV rebreather. About a year later (1997), Ambient Pressure Diving in the UK started selling the Inspiration electronically controlled closed circuit rebreather, followed by the KISS from Jetsam Technologies.

By 1998 French cave diver Olivier Isler used a fully redundant RI 2000 semi-closed rebreather in the Doux de Coly resurgence, France.

The recommendation for maximum PO_{2} supported by the technical diving community has since risen to 1.4 atm for the working dive and 1.6 atm for decompression, partly due to advice from diving physiologist Dr Bill Hamilton, and partly due to satisfactory experience. Safety was predicted to be the biggest challenge to acceptance of rebreathers, and this proved to be true. There were 200 rebreather fatalities reported worldwide between 1998 and 2012, when the third rebreather forum was held: about 10 per year between 1998 and 2005, and about 20 per year from 2006 to 2012, which is a risk five to ten times greater than on open circuit scuba. Evidence suggests that safety has continued to improve since 2012.

Some dates:

- 1967 – Electrolung
- 1987 – Bill Stone's FRED system
- 1994 – Rebreather Forum (1)
- AquaCorps journal started
- Nitrox workshop
- 1993 – Tek Conference
- 1995 – Draeger Atlantis
- 1996 – Rebreather forum 2.0, 2 manufacturers of rebreathers available to the public: Atlantis and Fieno
- 1997 – AP Buddy Inspiration.
- Cis Lunar Mk5, KISS Classic, Innerspace MEG, Halcyon RB80
- 2012 – Rebreather Forum 3, 12 manufacturers
- 2022 – 23 manufacturers, more than 40 models
- 2023 – Rebreather Forum 4

== Applications ==
Rebreathers have applications in technical, recreational, scientific and military diving. In commercial diving some of the technology is used in conjunction with surface-supplied diving equipment, particularly as helium reclaim systems and gas extenders, and for bailout equipment for closed bell diving.

=== Military diving ===
Tactical divers (frogmen) are the main users of oxygen rebreathers, and for deeper work such as clearance diving, when mobility and a low magnetic and acoustic signature are important, mixed gas SCRs and CCRs may be used. Each military service that deploys rebreather divers usually standardises on a small number of models suited to their use, to simplify logistics and training.

The US Navy also uses rebreathers for saturation bailout sets (JFD Divex COBRA and JFD Divex MK IV Secondary Life Support (SCR))

=== Technical diving ===
The largest variety and number of mixed gas units have been used in the technical diving applications,

At the time of Rebreather Forum 3 (2011) there were three rec/tec rebreather training agencies active. By Rebreather Forum 4 (2023) there were eight: (BSAC, FFESSM, GUE, IANTD, PADI, RAID, SSI, and TDI). During this time the total certifications per year rose from 3545 in 2012 to 5156 in 2022. These numbers include multiple certifications for many divers, at different skill levels and for different rebreather classes and units. Mean age at certification was about 42 years with a peak in the 50 to 59 year age group, presumed to be related to availability of disposable income.

=== Recreational diving ===
Rebreathers have not gained much traction in recreational diving, though a few models have been designed and marketed specifically for that purpose.

=== Scientific and archaeological diving ===
Biological researchers have used closed-circuit rebreathers since the late 1960s, and wider application in marine science has grown since the turn of the century.

Between 1998 and 2013 some 52 organizational members of the AAUS reported 10,988 rebreather dives for a total duration of about 9,915 hours. There was one incidence each of decompression illness, idiopathic immersion pulmonary edema, and hypoxia associated with these dives.

During this period 1,675,350 open-circuit dives with a dive time of 1,148,783 hours were logged by AAUS members. The number of rebreather dives is about 0.7% of the total number and about 0.9% of the underwater time logged for OC dives, but the number and duration of rebreather dives has been growing fairly consistently over this period. 17 rebreather models were reported, including oxygen rebreathers and mixed gas rebreathers. 52% of the dives were for operational scientific purposes and 48% for training. 23% of the dives required decompression stops. During this period there has been a general increase in the number of deep dives of more than 191 feet (58 m) on rebreathers and a decrease in the number of deep dives on open circuit.

Rebreathers provide specific advantages for underwater biological research, particularly for applications that depend on unobtrusive observers or for a stealthy approach to wildlife for capture or tagging, and research that requires extended durations underwater, or operations in relatively deep (more than 50 metres (160 ft)) environments, especially in remote locations with logistic difficulties. Many scientific institutions have been slow to adopt rebreather technology, but developments in rebreather technology are expanding acceptance.

One of the early users of rebreathers for science was Walter Starck, who invented the first electronically controlled closed-circuit rebreather for use in undersea biological research, which was soon followed by use in the Tektite II project for biological research during excursions from the submersed habitat. By the mid-1980s, interest in the application of rebreathers for scientific cave exploration coincided with amateur exploration activity which came to be known as technical diving, and underwater film-makers Howard Hall and Bob Cranston started to use rebreathers to approach marine life underwater with less risk of affecting behaviour.

In the middle- to late-1990s, rebreathers became more easily available from several manufacturers, and the scientific community started to use them more often, particularly where their logistical advantages were most apparent.

A major advantage of closed-circuit rebreathers for biological research diving is the absence of noise and visual disturbance due to the bubbles of exhaled gas, which is known to have disruptive effects on animal behaviour. This has proved particularly effective where the diver needs to closely approach or capture animals like sea otters, and has considerably facilitated recording of animal sounds. Use of rebreathers reduces problems of multiple dives and decompressions by allowing divers to conduct a single, long-duration dive without the need to return to the surface or shore between multiple dives, particularly where continuous observation is desirable. The ability to maintain a constant oxygen partial pressure can allow very much longer dive times in the middle depth ranges without incurring a decompression obligation, and can allow a single multilevel dive to suffice where several open circuit dives were previously required. The capital outlay for equipment and training can sometimes be rapidly offset by the improved efficiency of getting a job done in one dive on one day. Considerable savings on the cost of helium diluent are possible for deeper dives specially in remote locations where the cost of helium may be ten times that in industrialised areas.

Research submersibles allow direct access to deeper environments, but cost much more than rebreathers to operate and are limited to regions where such submersibles are in active use because of the logistical requirements and cost of running the support vessels. They are also limited in their ability to explore, sample, and document complex coral reef structures due to bulk and maneuverability and dexterity limitations.

Developments in electronically controlled closed circuit mixed gas rebreathers have extended the range of ambient pressure scientific diving since the mid-1990s. Various research stakeholders have started to seek and acquire data from locations which were previously inaccessible. Scientific diving programs have been establishing and developing technical diving facilities to allow marine scientists to safely access these regions. The nature of this extended range diving exposure makes it necessary to modify and adapt procedures to ensure acceptably safe operations. To a large degree this implies a high level of competence in operating the rebreather equipment, so the diver has sufficient excess capacity to allow the scientific task to be carried out successfully without compromising safety. This requires a high level of competence as a condition for completing initial training and maintenance of this competence by sufficient appropriate diving activity, or by refresher training and work-up dives following a period of inactivity. The use of institutionally approved checklists for equipment preparation and dive planning has been recommended as a way to reduce error and ensure that all essential steps are followed.

In scientific diving the primary objective is normally the planned task of the dive, and the dive is the most effective way to get to and from the place where the scientific work is to be done. In the underwater environment life-support must necessarily take priority over all other considerations, and when neglected may have fatal results. Open circuit equipment is simple robust and reliable and requires little management beyond gas and decompression status monitoring. With rebreathers the gas mixture is dynamic and monitoring and where necessary, control of the equipment is of critical importance. Procedural modifications may be needed to retain a similar level of safety.

The considerable variation in control systems between makes and in some cases models, of electronically controlled rebreathers makes it unrealistic to expect to be able to maintain reflexive familiarity with several units, and also have sufficient capacity to perform the scientific task effectively on top of managing the rebreather, and the more complex the dive and the more complex the scientific work the greater the risk. Besides ensuring adequate pre-dive testing to ensure that the equipment is functioning correctly, having a team member less invested in the science and highly skilled with the rebreather available to monitor the working diver or a pair of working divers and their equipment has been put forward as a way to reduce the risk of a failure going unnoticed or ignored. This safety support diver can also reduce task loading of the researcher by carrying some of the scientific equipment.

=== Commercial diving ===
The Lockout Breathing System was a commercial diving rebreather used in the North Sea for diving from a closed bell or lockout submersible. The diver carried a light backpack with counterlung and carbon dioxide scrubber, supplied through an umbilical. The system had a maximum operating depth of 300 msw, and recovered up to 92% of the gas. The scrubber was rated for a maximum of 4 hours dive time. There were alarms for high and low oxygen partial pressure, and the diver could bail out to a free-flow supply in an emergency. The system was used with the LAMA bubble helmet invented in 1976 by Yves le Masson.

The DIVEX COBRA (Compact Bailout Rebreathing Apparatus) is an emergency rebreather system intended for use as a bailout set for saturation diving to a maximum of 450 msw. It is CE certified to NORSOK U101 (Diving Respiratory Equipment) and EN14143 (Self Contained Rebreathing Apparatus). Work of breathing is claimed to be low. The semi-closed rebreather is purely mechanical in operation, has an endurance of 45 minutes using self contained gas supplied from twin cylinders mounted in the casing, and is activated by a single turn of a control valve.

=== Mixed mode and mixed platform diving ===
A mixed mode dive team is a buddy team where the divers use different modes of diving on the same dive, such as one diver on open circuit and the other on rebreather. Mixed platform rebreather diving refers to the use of different makes or models of rebreather on the same dive.

There are dive profiles and tasks in which mixed modes may not work well because of incompatible requirements for bottom times, decompression and gas planning, but there is a wide range of operations where this is much less of a problem, however it is necessary for both members of the team to be able to assist each other in an emergency, which requires the ability to recognise problems, and the knowledge, skills and equipment to respond appropriately. This includes knowledge of emergency procedures appropriate to the other diver's equipment. Some training and briefing is necessary, and appropriate procedures should be covered in the operations manual. Similar considerations apply to mixed platform diving, but to a lesser extent.

== See also ==
- Diving safety – Risk management of underwater diving activities
- Diving rebreather – Closed or semi-closed circuit scuba
- Rebreather – Portable apparatus to recycle breathing gas
- Scuba diving – Swimming underwater, breathing gas carried by the diver
