= Gamma 60 wind turbine =

Experimental wind turbine in Sardinia, Italy

- Classification: Two-bladed, upwind, teetered, variable speed, yaw control, horizontal-axis wind turbines (1.5 MW Gamma 60, 2 MW Gamma 2000)
- Inventor: Wind Energy Systems Taranto S.p.A., Hamilton Standard, ENEL, Aeritalia, Finmeccanica, ENEA (Italy), and Sulzer
- Invented: 1986
- Prototype tested: 1992 - 1997
- Number built: 3 (1 - Gamma 60; 2 – Gamma 2000)
- Total investment: ITL ₤39,000 million (USD $30 million)

The Gamma 60 wind turbine, a 1.5 MW two-bladed upwind horizontal axis wind turbine, was installed by Wind Energy Systems Taranto S.p.A. (WEST) at Alta Nurra, Sardinia, Italy in April 1992. Founded on original research and development work by NASA and Hamilton Standard (then a division of United Technologies Corporation), the Gamma 60 wind turbine was the world's first variable speed wind turbine with a teetering hinge.

The Gamma 60 wind turbine was commissioned to assess the feasibility and performance of power regulation through yaw control, rather than industry-standard blade pitch control, including broad range variable speed in a two-bladed teetering hinge wind turbine. The WEST Gamma 60 wind turbine project team included Hamilton Standard, ENEL, Aeritalia, Finmeccanica (now Leonardo), ENEA (Italy), and Sulzer.

Three Gamma turbines were manufactured, and one was erected and successfully tested from 1992 - 1997 on the Mediterranean island of Sardinia. Commercialization of the Gamma 60 prototype was planned, including a conditional investment for 10 Gamma turbines by a US utility, but legal disputes and contractual claims between WEST and ENEL, the privatization of ENEL, and tumbling oil prices in 1998 resulted in the program's cancellation.

== Overview ==
The Gamma 60 wind turbine's technology stems from Glidden Doman’s flexible two-bladed turbine system design that is compliant with the forces of nature rather than resistant to them. Doman, along with noted German-born aerospace engineer Kurt Hohenemser (a partner and confidant of the well-known German airplane and helicopter designer Anton Flettner), maintained that a flexible two-bladed helicopter type wind turbine rotor design that is compliant with the forces of nature was more suitable for producing electricity than the rigid industry standard three-bladed airplane type wind turbine rotors that, by design, can only be constructed to resist the forces of nature.

Gamma's robust design simplicity, which supports higher turbine rotation speeds, achieves lower torque, lower fatigue, a lighter drive train, and a longer life due to the teetering hub technology. The Gamma 60's teetering hub technology works in conjunction with an innovative yaw power control system that eliminates blade pitch control mechanisms. Gamma's teetering hub, which adds a degree of freedom to the turbine, dramatically reduces torque required to yaw the nacelle and greatly reduces the loads on the blades, drivetrain, and nacelle. The Gamma 60 was designed for high wind power output, long life, low investments, and reduced maintenance costs to satisfy the requirements of electricity utilities.

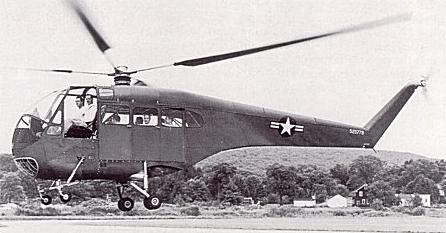
Doman LZ-5/YH-31

== History of Development ==
Evolution of the Gamma 60 wind turbine can be traced back to World War II when Sikorsky Aircraft (now owned by Lockheed Martin, but then a division of United Technologies Corporation) hired American engineer Glidden Doman to address helicopter structural and dynamic problems including blade failures. Igor Sikorsky developed and flew the first successful helicopter in the United States during 1939. Doman founded one of America's original six helicopter companies (Doman Helicopters, Inc.) after making major contributions to the use of Sikorsky helicopters during World War II. Doman's initial helicopter, the LZ-1A - a Sikorsky R-6 converted to a Doman rotor and control system, first flew in 1947. The LZ-1A was followed in development by the LZ-4 in 1950. Doman Helicopters' most prominent achievement was the Doman LZ-5/YH-31 eight-place helicopter, which received FAA certification on December 30, 1955. The unique feature of this helicopter was its hinge-less but gimbaled, tilting rotor hub that greatly reduced stress and vibration in the blades and in the whole helicopter.

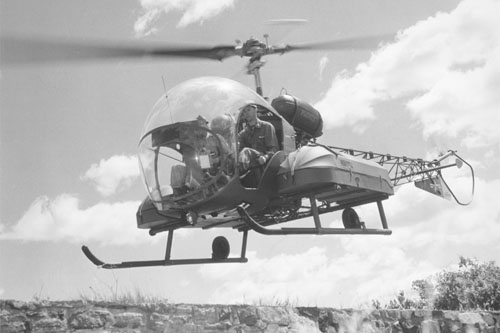
Bell 47 (H-13G)

Two-bladed, teetering hinge rotor designs have been used extensively in helicopters, most notably in numerous models and many thousands of helicopters built by the Bell Helicopter company. The Bell 47, with its distinctive "soap bubble" cockpit canopy windshield, was used in the Korean War (e.g. MEDEVAC missions, in M*A*S*H series, and one is on display at the Museum of Modern Art in New York) and the Bell 204 was used extensively in the Vietnam War.

Bell's two-bladed rotor with a teetering hinge and Doman Helicopters' four-bladed rotor with a gimbaled hinge, offered similar benefits in reducing stresses in the rotor blades and preventing much of the stress from being transmitted to the fuselage. Glidden Doman believed that the four-bladed rotor was smoother during a helicopter's forward flight, but since wind turbines are not involved in forward flight, the two-bladed wind turbine design offered the same benefits with greater simplicity. Two of Doman’s helicopters, the converted Sikorsky R-6 (Doman LZ-1A) and a Doman LZ-5/YH-31, are on display at the New England Air Museum in Windsor Locks, Connecticut.

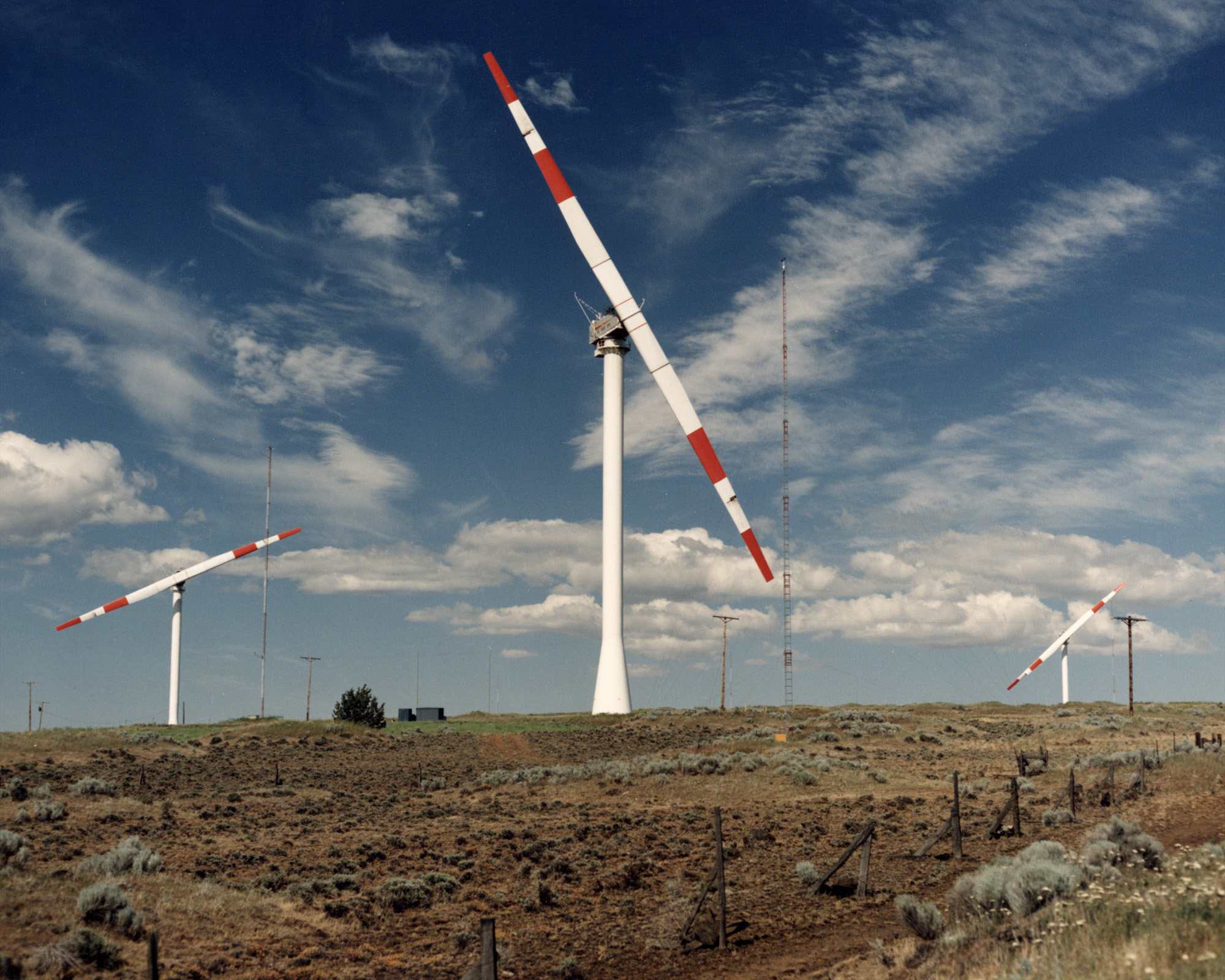
Mod-2 2.5 MW Wind Turbine Cluster

== NASA Research & Development ==
Glidden Doman was one of the first to transfer knowledge of helicopter rotor dynamics technology to wind turbines. In 1973, the Middle East oil embargo escalated interest in wind energy technology development. From 1974 - 1981, the NASA Glenn Research Center, formerly the Lewis Research Center in Cleveland, Ohio, initiated a US wind energy program for the development of utility-scale horizontal axis wind turbines.

A 1975 National Science Foundation (NSF) contract provided Glidden Doman with funding to explore wind turbine structural dynamics with the objective to eliminate the possibility of wind turbine blade failures due to turbulence. Boeing's MOD-2 with the Doman-conceived flexible design, two-bladed wind turbine with a teetering hinge, became a flagship achievement in this 7-year NASA managed wind energy program for the U.S. Department of Energy and the U.S. Department of the Interior.

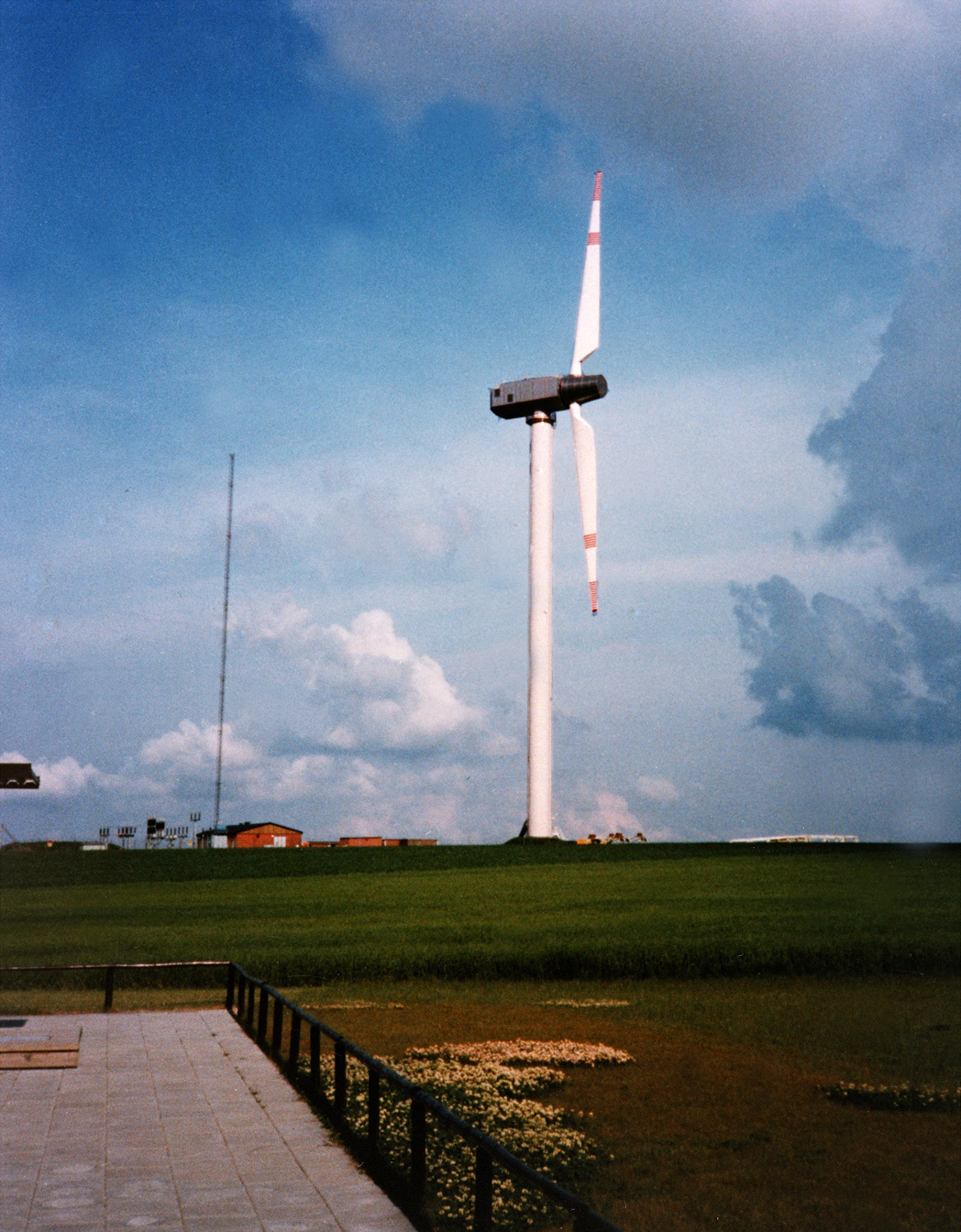
WTS-4 (4.2 MW wind turbine in Medicine Bow, Wyoming. This turbine held the world power output record for over 20 years)

== Two-bladed wind turbines ==
=== WTS-4 ===
In 1978, Glidden Doman was hired by Hamilton Standard to design wind turbines. In 1982, Hamilton Standard installed the WTS-4, a 4.2 MW two-bladed wind turbine in Medicine Bow, Wyoming. The WTS-4, the first 4 MW wind turbine installed anywhere in the world, was a downwind horizontal-axis wind turbine with a teetering hub, soft steel tower, and pitch power control. This turbine was fabricated for the U.S. Department of Interior, Bureau of Reclamation, by United Technologies’ Hamilton Standard division as a potential forerunner of a number of wind turbines to be installed at Medicine Bow, Wyoming in a long-range plan to integrate wind power with hydroelectric power.

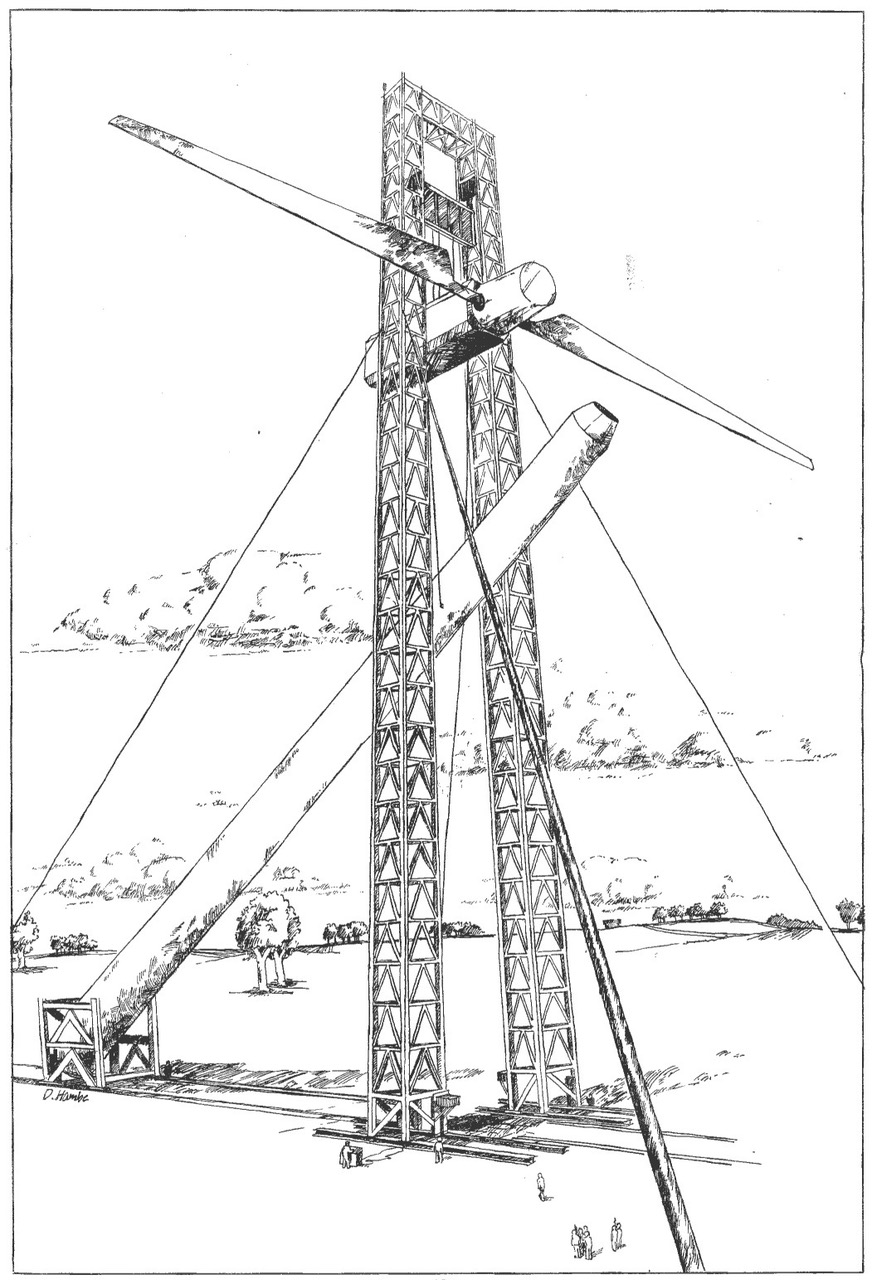
The erection of the WTS-3, a 3 MW wind turbine, during May 1982 in Maglarp, Trelleborg, Skåne, south part of Sweden. Illustration by Dan Hambe

=== WTS-3 ===
After an intense competition involving 5 European consortium competitors, the team of Hamilton Standard and the Swedish shipyard Karlskronavarvet (now Saab Kockums) was awarded a contract to develop the WTS-3, a two-bladed, downwind, horizontal-axis wind turbine rated at 3 MW. In 1983, Karlskronavarvet installed the WTS-3 in the town of Maglarp, Sweden. The WTS-3, which was developed in cooperation with US based Hamilton Standard, also featured a soft steel tower that has become the standard for multi-MW wind turbines.

Hamilton Standard’s contribution to this program was the overall system design, the mechanical design of the rotor and pitch change system, and fabrication of the blades. The WTS-3 (50 Hz) and WTS-4 (60 Hz) were essentially the same turbine (i.e. filament winding blades, mechanical-hydraulic pitch mechanism system, teetering hinge, and soft tower) with different fixed speeds. This turbine was decommissioned in 1993 after it generated 37 GWh during it 11 years of operation, at the time, a world record for wind turbines.

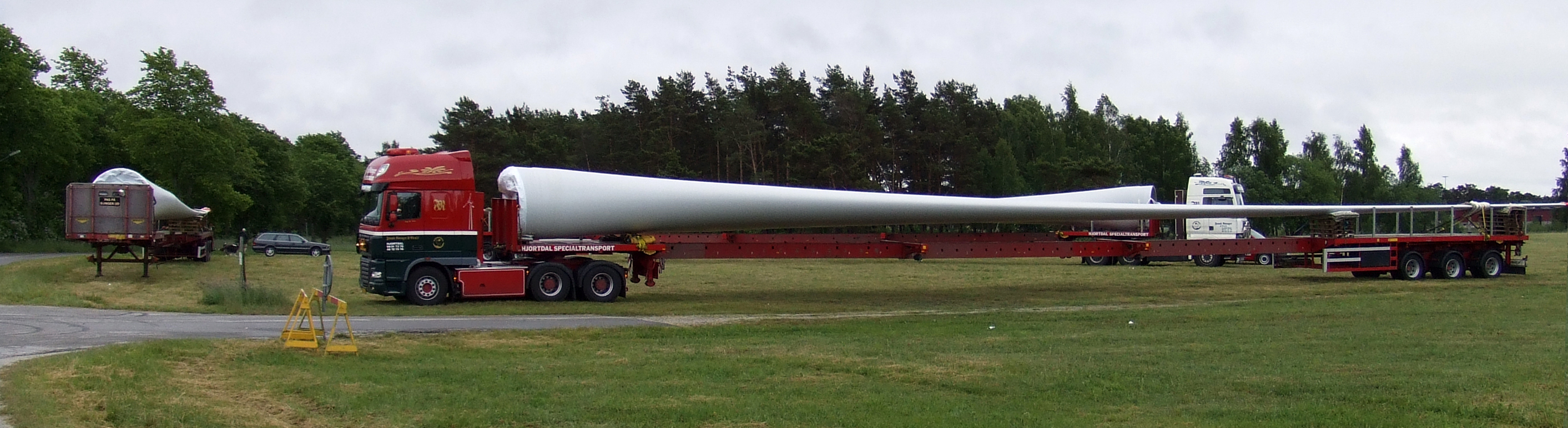
Turbine blades transport to the south coast of Gotland, Sweden

=== WTS-75/Näsudden I ===
The other bid winner was Karlstads Mekaniska Werkstad KMW (also known as Kamewa), which proposed a 75 m, two-bladed, upwind turbine with a beveled gear that enabled placing the asynchronous generator inside the tower rather than the nacelle. In 1984, the WTS-75, a 2 MW wind turbine, started operations in Näsudden on the south coast of Gotland, Sweden. As was the case with the WTS-3, a number of components of the WTS-75 wind turbine had to be repaired or modified within the first years of operation. The WTS-75, like most other multi-MW wind turbines during its era, did not have a teetering hinge and had a stiff tower that was made of concrete, which was considerably thicker than soft steel towers.

The stiff WTS-75 system design without damping was problematic, possibly contributing to the cracks that appeared in the steel beams of the blades. Cracks in the blades were repaired by welding but ultimately, in 1988, the operation had to be halted after a crack appeared close to the hub in one of the blades. In 1991, main turbine components were dismantled but the concrete tower was left and reused for the Näsudden II.

The WTS-4 was the most powerful wind turbine to have operated onshore in the US and it held the world record for power output for over 20 years. Toward the end of the WTS-4 project, NASA provided Doman with funding to explore broad range variable speed. The outcome of Doman's work was a strong patent in his name and the conclusion that such a variable speed system (i.e. the Gamma turbine) should be developed. After an extensive due diligence review, Enel (Italy's largest utility) and Aeritalia bought a license from United Technologies and moved Glidden Doman to Italy where the Gamma 60 technology was designed and demonstrated under Wind Energy Systems Taranto SpA (WEST).

== Gamma 60 Project ==
Gamma, the Italian acronym for WEST's (Wind Energy Systems Taranto SpA) project - “Advanced Multi Megawatt Wind Generator” (Generatore Anemoelettrico Multi Megawatt Avanzato), began in 1986 and explored all available technology to create a turbine design optimized for economic performance. In this program, Glidden Doman applied his latest thinking to a new machine, considerably improved over the WTS-4 and WTS-3 machines he had designed for installation in Wyoming and Sweden respectively. Under Doman's leadership a team of Italian engineers designed the Gamma 60 turbine. The Gamma 60 wind turbine adopted the upwind configuration and variable speed concept from the WTS-75, the filament winding blade technology from the WTS-4 and WTS-3, and the teetering hinge with elastomeric material from Glidden Doman’s helicopter technology. Based on direct and indirect experiences spanning 50 years, Doman concluded that upwind turbine configuration is better than downwind from a loading standpoint and that zero Delta three angle is important for rotor stability.

The Gamma 60 was the world's first variable speed wind turbine with a teetering hinge. A primary objective of the Gamma 60 project was to test power control of a two-bladed teetering hinge turbine by yawing the rotor rather than pitching the blades.

Gamma’s technology is based on Doman’s design philosophy of compliance with the forces of nature in its teetered hub, flexible tower, and broad-range variable-speed power train rather than resistance to these forces, which is prevalent in 3-bladed Danish turbine designs. Doman’s work was further inspired by German aerospace engineer Kurt Hohenemser who declared that wind turbines should be two-bladed, fixed pitch, and controlled by yawing to achieve the highest reliability. Dr. Hohenemser, along with his mentor Anton Flettner, developed helicopters for the U.S. military after being among the first German immigrants in the United States after World War II.

Gamma’s turbine consists of two blades which are rigidly interconnected with each other through the hub, but there is a teetering hinge between the hub and the shaft. The resulting free teetering of the rotor eliminates certain greatly variable aerodynamic forces on the blades that would otherwise occur. It also precludes any significant vibratory forces reaching the rotor shaft, the nacelle, or the tower.

Glidden Doman successfully replicated the benefits associated with the four-bladed helicopter rotor with a gimbal hinge, while also recognizing advantages inherent in two-bladed helicopter rotors, in the development of the Gamma 60 two-bladed rotor with a teetering hinge. The 1.5 MW Gamma 60 HAWT started operating at Alta Nurra, Sardinia, Italy in July 1992. Power from the Gamma 60 turbine is controlled by yawing the rotor, a maneuver made possible by the load alleviation resulting from the soft-system design. Features including the teetering hinge that eliminate major vibratory loading, allow a Gamma system to be very lightweight and yet have essentially infinite fatigue life. The teetering hinge, along with the lower shaft torque due to higher running speed, leads to a very lightweight system.

Broad range variable speed allows Gamma to operate at rotational speeds proportional to the wind speed. This allows the Gamma turbine to be noticeably quiet when the wind is moderate and to run faster under high wind conditions.

Since there are no blade pitch control mechanisms in the rotating system, the Gamma turbine’s reliability and maintainability are superior. Moreover, Gamma has important intrinsic safety values that come from the simplicity of its features and from the rotor which is designed to be unharmed even in case of a free running overspeed under the most severe load case. In fact, because a Gamma system feels no ill effects from turbulence even at high running speed, there is no need to set a cutout speed at which it must be shut down.

NASA recognized the accomplishments of Gamma by featuring it with a detailed description in ASME publication “Wind Turbine Technology: Fundamental Concepts in Wind Turbine Engineering” edited by David A. Spera.

=== Gamma 60 Design Data ===
Description	Data
Rated power	1.5 MW
Maximum power	1.5 MW
Hub height	66 m
Rotor diameter	60 m
Swept area	2,827 m^{2} (30,430 sq ft)
Cut in wind speed	4 m/s (13 ft/s)
Wind speed at rated power	14.6 m/s (48 ft/s)
Wind speed at rated torque	12.3 m/s (40 ft/s)
Cut out wind speed	27 m/s (89 ft/s)
Rated rotor torque	380 kNm on average
Rated rotor thrust	280 kNm on average
Gearbox ratio	33.0 (2 stages)
Yaw torque capacity	2 drives 400 kNm total
Maximum required yaw rate	8 deg/s, with peaks of 10 deg/s
Mechanical brake capacity	671 kNm
Blade weight (each)	6.3 t
Weight of nacelle & rotor	99.5 t
Generator type	Induction
Design life	20 years

=== Project Investment ===
The total investment amount for the Gamma 60 wind turbine project, ITL ₤39,000 million (US$30 million), was provided in two tranches. On October 10, 1986, a contract in the amount of ITL ₤20,000 million ITL (US$15.385 million) contract was signed between Aeritalia, Fiat Aviazione, and ENEA (Italy) to develop the Gamma 60. On March 12, 1987, a contract in the amount of ITL £19,000 million (US$14.615 million) was signed between Aeritalia, Fiat Aviazione, and Enel to uprate and improve the Gamma 60 with 2 Gamma 2000 (2 MW) wind turbines.

Funding for the Gamma 60 project contracts was provided by Enel - ITL ₤15,000 million (US$11.538 million); ENEA (Italy) – ITL ₤10,500 million (US$8.077 million); the European Community – ITL ₤10,500 million (US$8.077 million); and industrial partners – ITL ₤3,000 million (US$2.308 million). As participants in the project team, ENEA (Italy) provided research and development; Hamilton Standard contributed with system design, control software, and blade manufacturing; Sulzer fabricated the shaft and yaw drives, Finmeccanica (via Ansaldo) manufactured the generator and control system. Enel’s role, in addition to being a customer for the electricity produced, was in technological supervision of Gamma 60’s development, operation of the Gamma 60; Enel was also earmarked to install and operate the Gamma 2000 (2 MW) turbines. On July 03, 1990, Aeritalia, after acquiring Fiat Aviazione, transferred the ownership of its wind turbine business to Wind Energy Systems Taranto SpA (WEST).

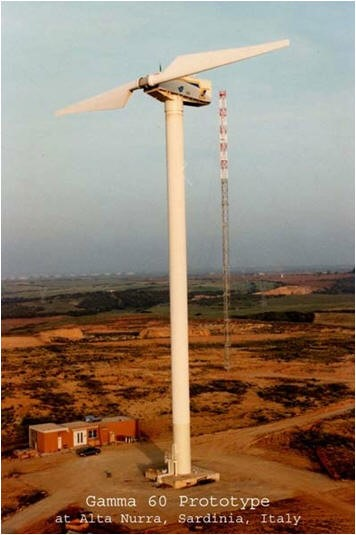
Gamma 60 - 1.5 MW prototype

=== Project Milestones ===
The WEST Gamma 60 prototype was installed at Alta Nurra, Sardinia, Italy in April 1992 and was followed by its very first grid connection in June 1992. After commissioning, the operation of the turbine gradually increased in terms of rated power, until 1500 kW was reached in August 1994.

Date	Description
April 1987	Design started
April 1992	Installation
June 1992	First grid connection
April 6, 1993	Commissioning starts
April 6 – November 15, 1993	Continuous operation with limited power (750 kW)
November 15, 1993 – February 2, 1994	Continuous operation with limited power (1100 kW)
February 2, 1994 – August 26, 1994	Continuous operation with limited power (1200 kW)
July 1994	New brake pads of sintered material installed
August 26, 1994 – January 23, 1995	Continuous operation with limited power (1500 kW)
December 23, 1995	End of contractual commissioning obligation with Enel
May 12, 1995	Fire in the nacelle
May 12, 1995 – October 30, 1996	Wind turbine repair and design review
October 30, 1996 – January 1, 1997	Tests on site without grid connection
January 21, 1997	First grid connection
January 21 – April 24, 1997	Tests on site with rotation commissioning test
April 24 – June 30, 1997	Contractual recommissioning with Enel

Through October 1, 1997, the Gamma 60 produced to the grid 4,390 hours (generator hours) and 1,318 MWh as illustrated in the table below.

== Project Conclusions ==
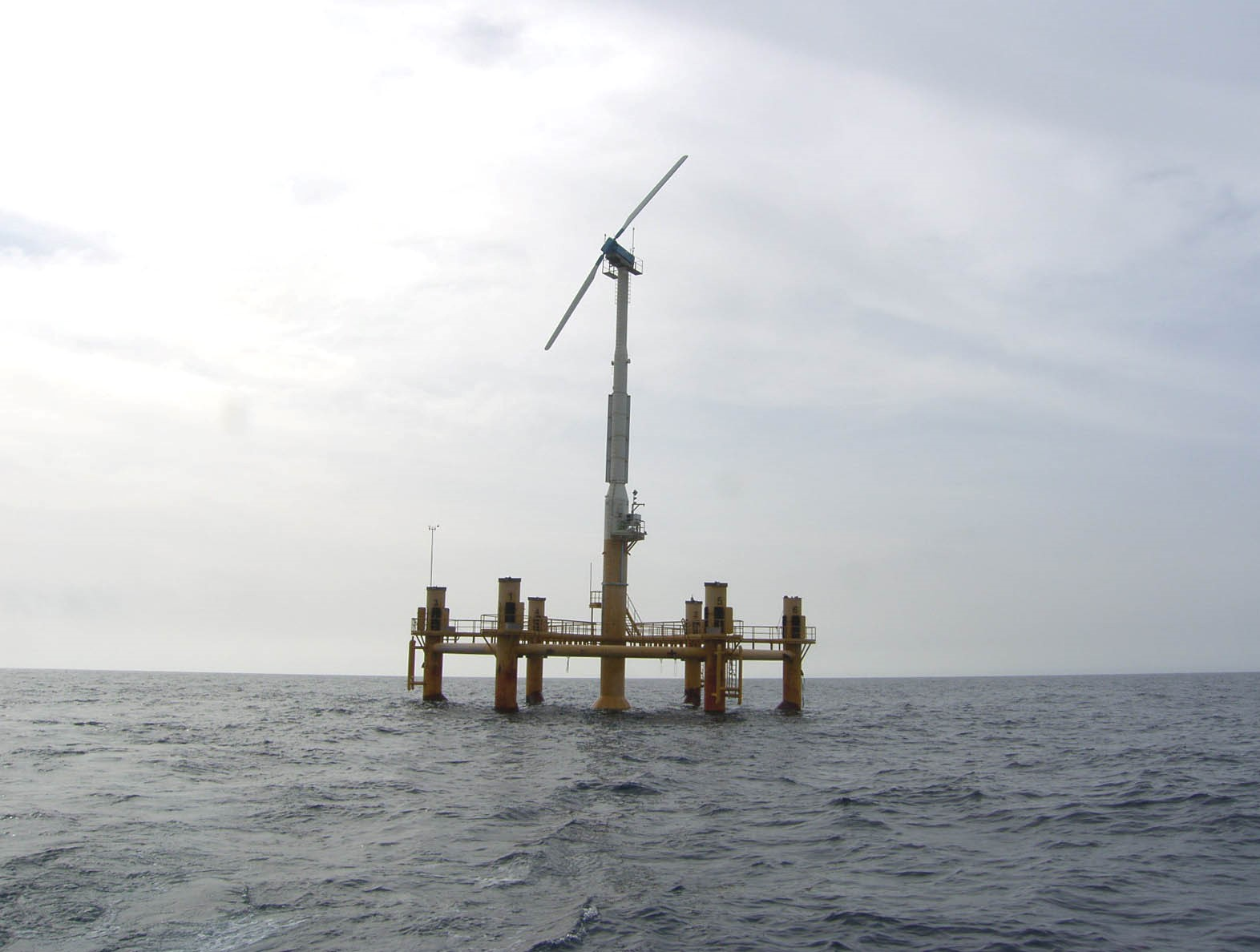
Blue H Technologies - World's first floating wind turbine

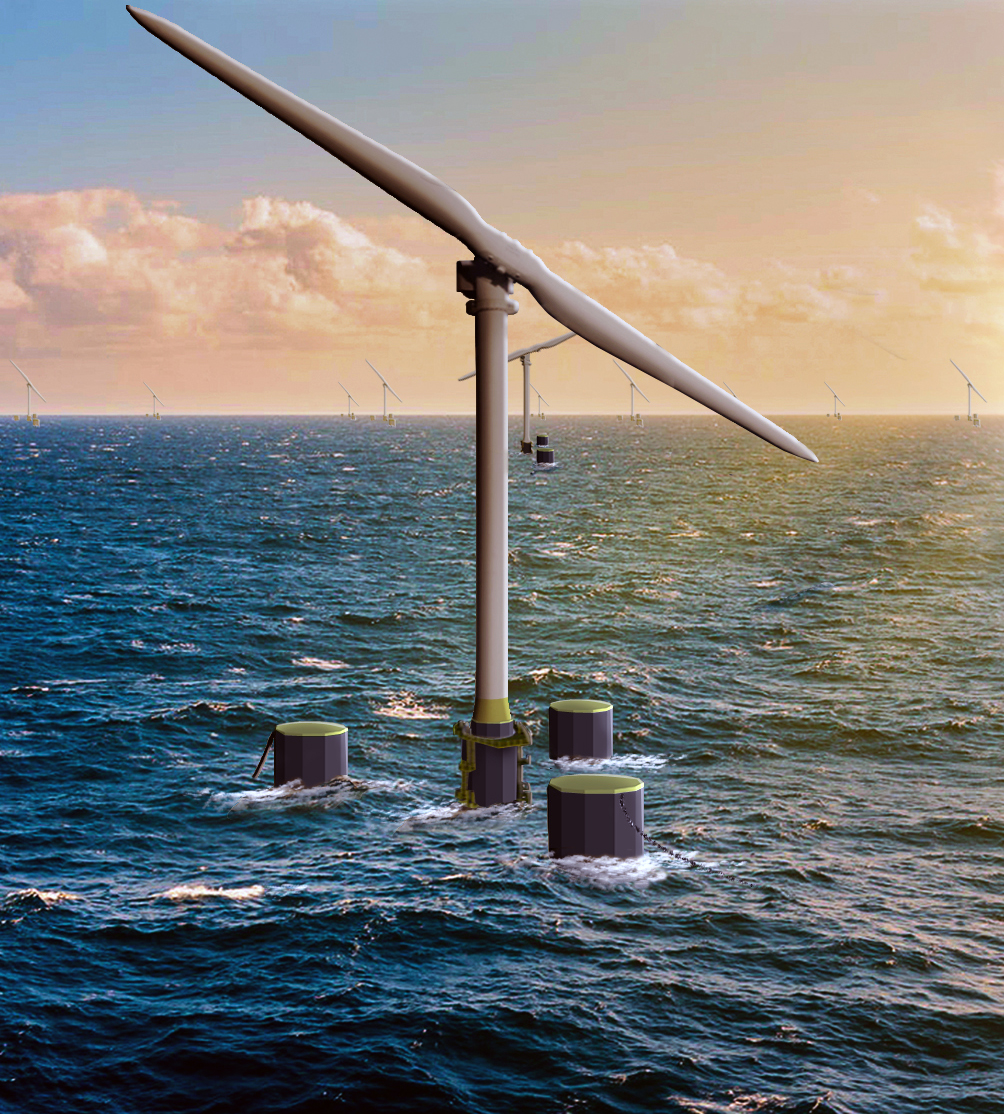
Seawind Ocean Technology Two-Bladed Floating Wind Turbine

In 1997, Silvestro Caruso, an Italian nuclear mechanical engineer who was assigned by Finmeccanica (now Leonardo SpA) for an independent review of the Gamma 60 turbine concluded, with Glidden Doman and the design review team, that Gamma technology has great potential. Further development to reduce costs (optimized blade molds and filament winding upgrades) and improve performance (increased maintainability, more reliability & redundancy in the electrical and electronic field) were identified targets for industrialized Gamma wind turbines. The WEST team, under the leadership of Glidden Doman, successfully replicated the benefits associated with the four-bladed helicopter rotor with a gimbal hinge, while also recognizing advantages inherent in two-bladed helicopter rotors, in the development of the Gamma 60 two-bladed rotor with a teeter hinge and yaw power control.

The scope of the Gamma 60 project contract between WEST and ENEL was to test the Gamma 60 yaw control system and to uprate the resulting prototype to 2 MW with improvements to make the wind turbine suitable for commercial production. However, WEST manufactured the Gamma 2000 turbines just like the Gamma 60, only increasing the running speed without any improvements. Plans to commercialize the prototype were well underway prior to the end of the Gamma 60 project. ENEA (Italy), since the beginning with the partially fabricated two Gamma 2000 turbines, requested that WEST continue with its commitment for development and production of large utility-scale wind turbines. Additionally, a US utility, after reviewing a cost saving study and price quotation, requested to buy a set of 10 Gamma wind turbines under the condition that the units would not be left “orphaned” by West. However, Finmeccanica could not guarantee this commitment because it considered the business too unprofitable due to depressed oil prices in 1998. Commercialization plans for the Gamma 60 prototype were halted, including a conditional investment for 10 Gamma turbines by a US utility, because of legal disputes and contractual claims between WEST and Enel, the privatization of Enel, and tumbling oil prices in 1998.

== Post Gamma 60 Project Development ==
In 2004, Glidden Doman and Silvestro Caruso decided to acquire from Finmeccanica (through Ansaldo) the rights for the Gamma technology, along with the technical documentation and two yet to be completed 2 MW Gamma turbines. For this acquisition, along with other shareholders, they founded and launched Gamma Ventures, Inc.

After some revisions in corporate structures and plans, the Gamma rights were eventually transferred to a new company, Seawind Ocean Technology B.V., which is working on placing turbines with Gamma type rotors (Seawind 6-126 and Seawind 12-225) on self-installing concrete offshore floating wind turbine support structures, aiming to do so in numerous locations around the world.

== See also ==
- NASA wind turbines
- Offshore wind power
- Variable speed wind turbine
- Floating wind turbine
- Wind power
