= Glidden Doman =

American aeronautical engineer

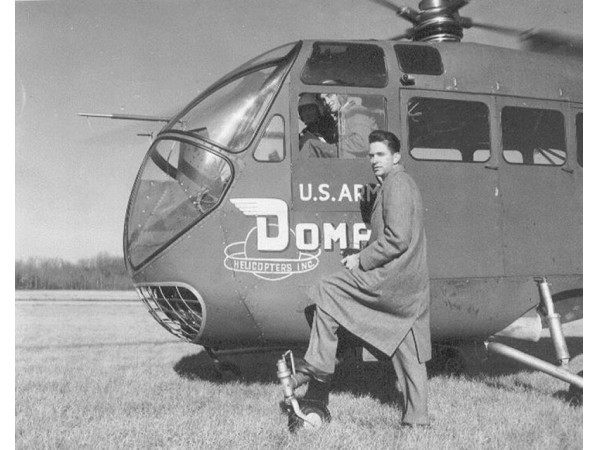
Glidden Doman with the Doman LZ-5/YH-31 helicopter (1953)

Glidden Doman (January 28, 1921 – June 6, 2016) was an American aeronautical engineer and pioneer in helicopters and modern wind turbines. He founded one of America's original six helicopter companies (Doman Helicopters, Inc.) after making major contributions to the use of Sikorsky helicopters during World War II. Doman Helicopters' most prominent achievement was the Doman LZ-5/YH-31 eight-place helicopter, which received FAA certification on December 30, 1955. The unique feature of this helicopter was its hinge-less but gimbaled, tilting rotor hub that greatly reduced stress and vibration in the blades and the whole helicopter.

Doman was one of the first to transfer knowledge of helicopter rotor dynamics technology to wind turbines. The 1973 arab oil embargo prompted NASA Glenn Research Center in Cleveland, Ohio to lead a 7-year US wind energy program for the development of utility-scale horizontal axis wind turbines. This program featured the creation of Boeing's MOD-2 with the Doman conceived flexible rotor design, two-bladed wind turbine with a teeter hinge. Following the NASA project, while working for Boeing, Hamilton Standard division of United Technologies, and Aeritalia (later known as Alenia) in Italy, Doman developed large two-bladed, teeter-hinged wind turbines, including the WTS-3, WTS-4, and the Gamma 60. After testing the Gamma 60 wind turbine in Sardinia from 1992 - 1997, Doman and Italian nuclear mechanical engineer Silvestro Caruso founded Gamma Ventures, Inc. to further develop and market this technology. Gamma Ventures subsequently invested in, and sold a license to Seawind Ocean Technology of the Netherlands, to commercialize the same two-bladed, teeter-hinge wind turbine concept.

Doman, along with noted German-born aerospace engineer Kurt Hohenemser (a partner and confidant of the well-known German airplane and helicopter designer Anton Flettner), maintained that a flexible two-bladed helicopter type wind turbine rotor design that is compliant with the forces of nature was more suitable for producing electricity than the rigid industry standard three-bladed airplane type wind turbine rotors that, by design, can only be constructed to resist the forces of nature.

Two of Doman's helicopters, the converted Sikorsky R-6 (Doman LZ-1A) and a Doman LZ-5/YH-31, are on display at the New England Air Museum in Windsor Locks, Connecticut.

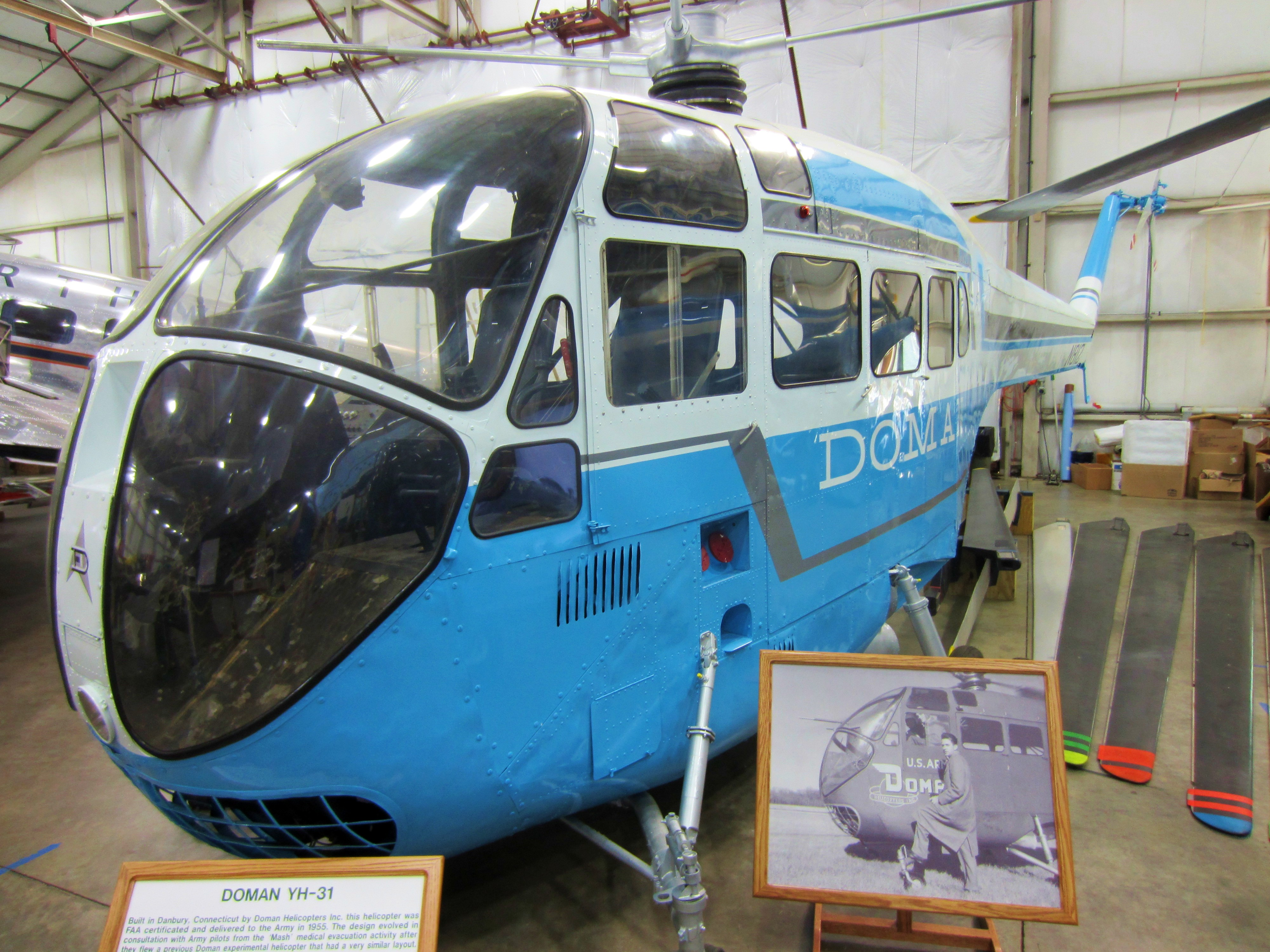
Doman LZ-5/YH-31 helicopter at the New England Air Museum

== Early life ==
Glidden Sweet Doman, the son of Albert E. Doman and Ruth Sweet Doman, was born in Syracuse, New York, on January 28, 1921. Living in the small upstate New York village of Elbridge, Doman came from a family of inventors and entrepreneurs. His father Albert and uncles Lewis and George Doman were the first to provide electricity for Elbridge, in 1890. Doman's elder half-brother, Carl T. Doman, designed air cooled Franklin engines for Franklin automobiles and for aircraft – including for the pioneering Sikorsky VS-300 helicopter.

In his teens, Doman built a series of six motorized "go carts", and in 1936, at the age of 15, he built a Soapbox Derby racer, the first to be aerodynamically streamlined. He won the regional Soapbox Derby race held in Syracuse and placed well in the national championship race in Akron, Ohio. (2)(4) Doman also attempted to build an airplane, completing much of the fuselage, but was never able to obtain an engine for it.

In 1938, Doman enrolled at the University of Michigan (Ann Arbor) College of Engineering, where he majored in aeronautical engineering. While at Michigan, Doman joined and later became president of the flying club. Another member of the flying club, Joan Hamilton, Doman's future bride, was the only female member of the club. Hamilton obtained her private's pilot license and later during World War II she was invited by the famous aviator Jackie Cochran to join the WASPs (Women Air Force Service Pilots), but she declined the offer.

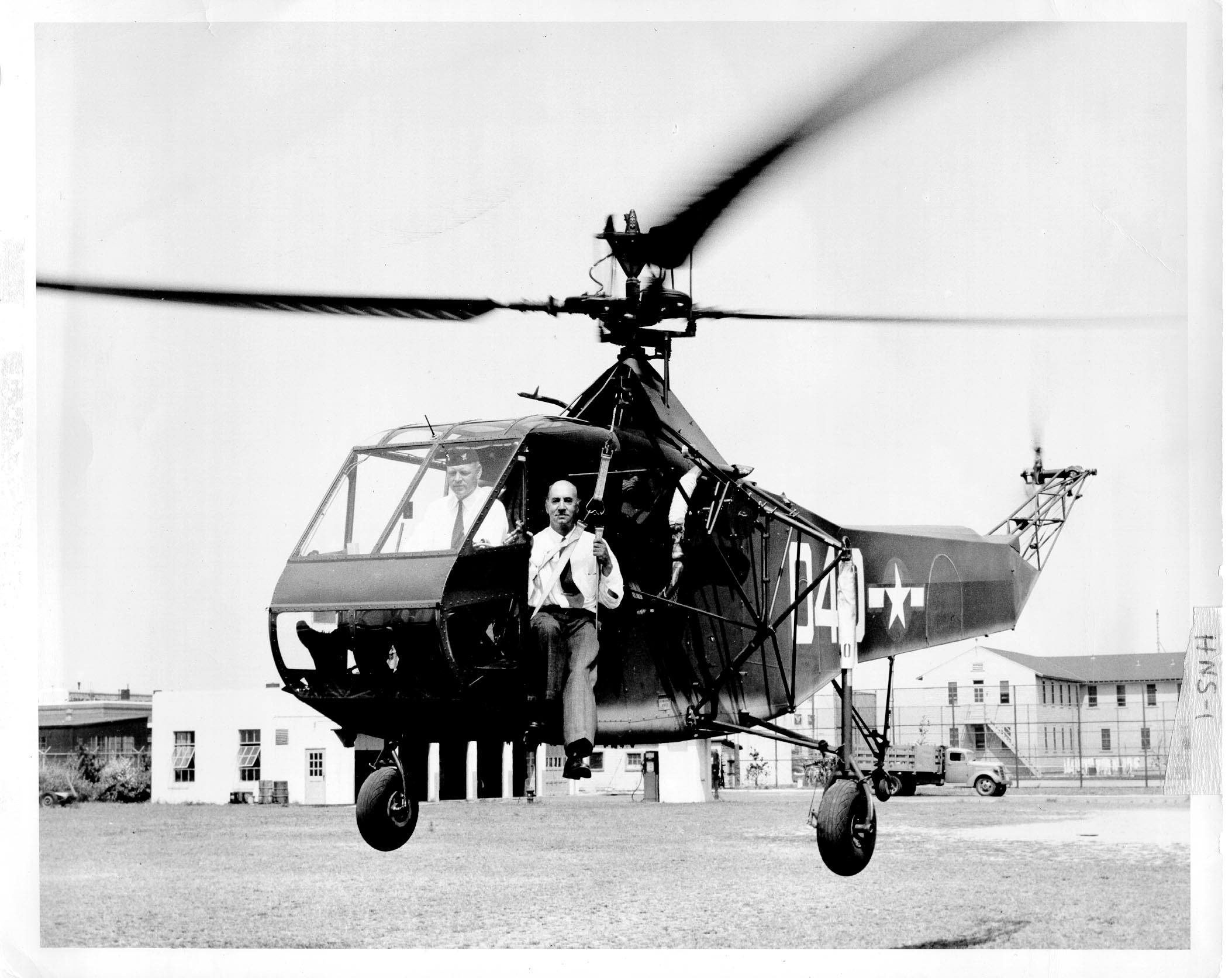
Sikorsky R-4 (August 14, 1944, the world's first large-scale mass-produced helicopter)

== First employments ==
Doman graduated from Michigan in June 1942, just six months after the bombing of Pearl Harbor. After his graduation, he went to work for the Ranger Aircraft Engine Division of Fairchild Aviation in Long Island, New York. Doman had prior experience working with engine technologies while employed during summer vacations at the Franklin Engine Company (where his brother Carl worked). At Ranger, Doman gained experience in using strain gauges to analyze the vibratory loads on the rotating parts of engines.

Carl Doman, who knew Igor Sikorsky due to the Franklin engine's use in the Sikorsky VS-300, invited Doman to attend a Society of Automotive Engineers meeting in New York. At this event, with Sikorsky as a featured speaker, Doman became interested in the vibratory loads in helicopter rotors. As a new and unrefined invention at that time, helicopters were suffering from rotor blades with a very short fatigue life. In fact, not long after Doman met Sikorsky, a Sikorsky YR-4 had a blade fracture during a delivery flight to the Army, which stimulated Doman's interest all the more.

In August 1943, Doman married Joan Hamilton and they immediately moved to Stamford, Connecticut where he commuted to and from work for Sikorsky in Bridgeport, CT. Doman put strain gages all over the rotor system of a Sikorsky YR-4 to locate the weak points. He then figured out where and how to change the rotor system to achieve longer blade life. Doman's contributions were so vital that Igor Sikorsky himself appealed to Doman's Draft Board to keep him on the test program instead of sending him into the Army or Navy. Doman discovered that the design of the rotor hub was the real cause of the blade failures. For the duration of World War II, he ran a program to match and balance the blades of all the Sikorsky helicopters before they were delivered. Throughout his tenure at Sikorsky, Doman was continuously learning about rotor dynamics.

Doman had one very harrowing experience at Sikorsky when he was flying as a test engineer on a YR-4. The pilot had slowed the helicopter to a very low speed, and it got into the so-called "vortex ring state" where the blades lose lift and the helicopter thrashes around in an almost uncontrollable fashion. Fatal crashes from such an event have resulted more than once in the history of rotary wing aviation. In this case, however, the pilot somehow got the helicopter flying backwards, which enabled the blades to regain their lifting ability and prevent a crash. While at Sikorsky, Doman got to know Igor Sikorsky, and for years afterwards Doman liked to repeat his favorite quote from Igor Sikorsky, "God takes care of helicopters."

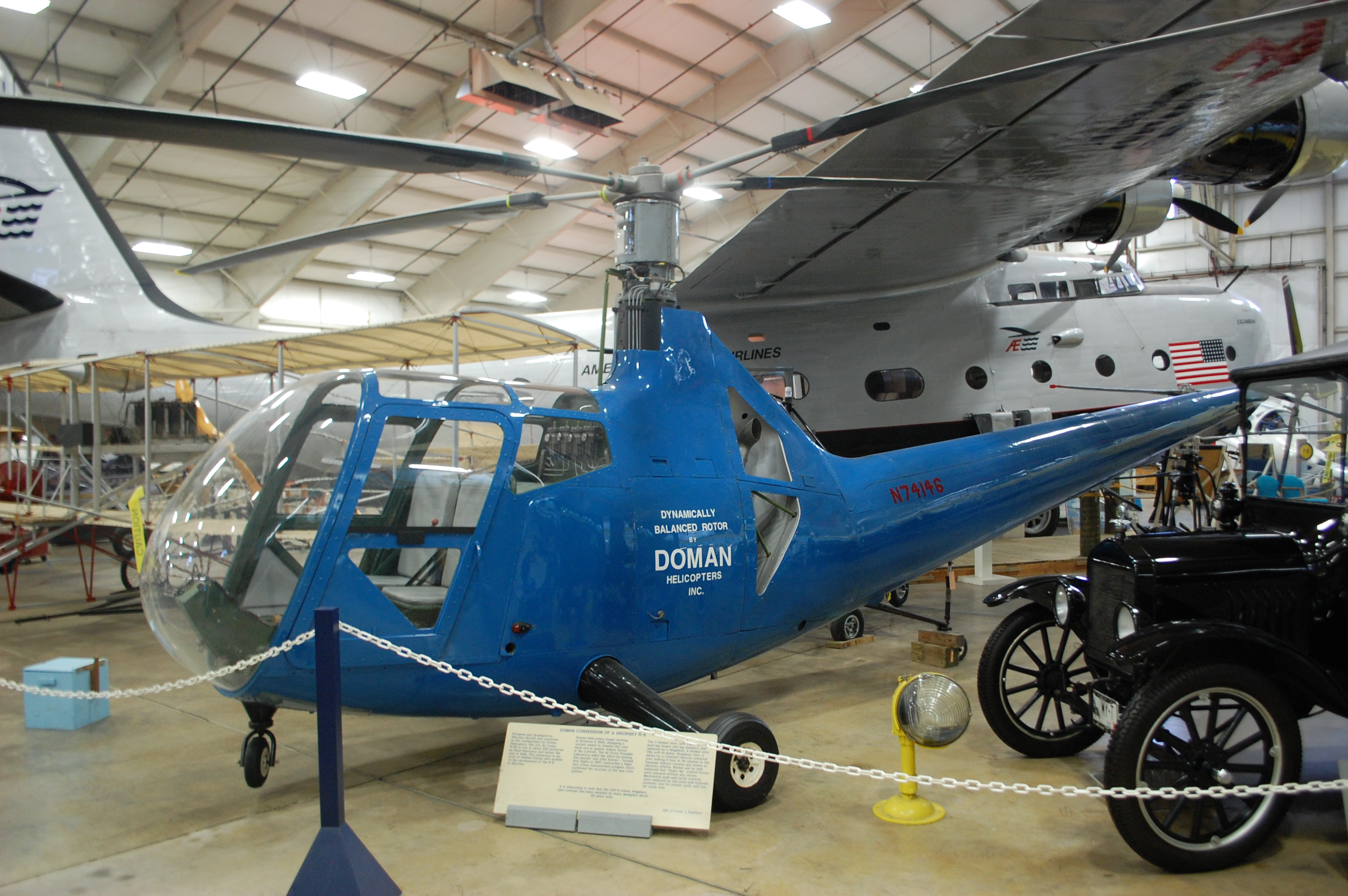
Doman LZ-1A (Sikorsky R-6 conversion)

== The Doman Helicopter company ==
Together with Clinton Frazier, a mathematician and colleague at Sikorsky, Doman left Sikorsky after WW II to further develop and implement his ideas. Doman-Frazier Helicopters, Inc. was established in the autumn of 1945. The company was initially located in the back of a law office in New York City, but soon moved into a barn in Stratford, Connecticut, not far from the Sikorsky plant. With financial assistance from the United States Army Air Corps, Doman obtained a war surplus R-6 Sikorsky helicopter. Doman and his engineering team modified the R-6 by creating an entirely new rotor system which featured a unique gimbaled rotor hub that was subsequently used in all Doman helicopters. After extensive successful flight testing of the modified Sikorsky R-6 (Doman LZ-1A), Doman's team designed and built, in a joint venture with the Curtiss-Wright Corp., an all-new Doman helicopter, the CW-40. The CW-40 was followed a couple of years later by the Doman LZ-5/YH-31. The many innovative features in this helicopter were soon covered by numerous Doman patents. Meanwhile, after the departure of Mr. Frazier, the company was renamed Doman Helicopters, Inc. and moved to Danbury, CT. Doman Helicopters continued for nearly 20 years, building and testing several helicopters and performing other related aircraft work to sustain the company while it attempted to establish itself as a major helicopter manufacturer. The Doman LZ-5/YH-31 helicopters were extensively tested by the company and by the U.S. Army and Navy. They received certification from the United States FAA, and from the equivalent Canadian authority, for sale and commercial use, after passing the rigorous tests necessary for such approvals. Doman LZ-5/YH-31 helicopters toured the U.S. and were well received by potential customers, especially in the oil industry along the Gulf Coast. One even toured in France and Italy performing at the Paris Air Show in 1960.

Doman helicopters were a technical success but the company was unable to raise sufficient venture capital to set up an assembly line for mass production. The company ceased operations in 1969 and was legally dissolved shortly thereafter.

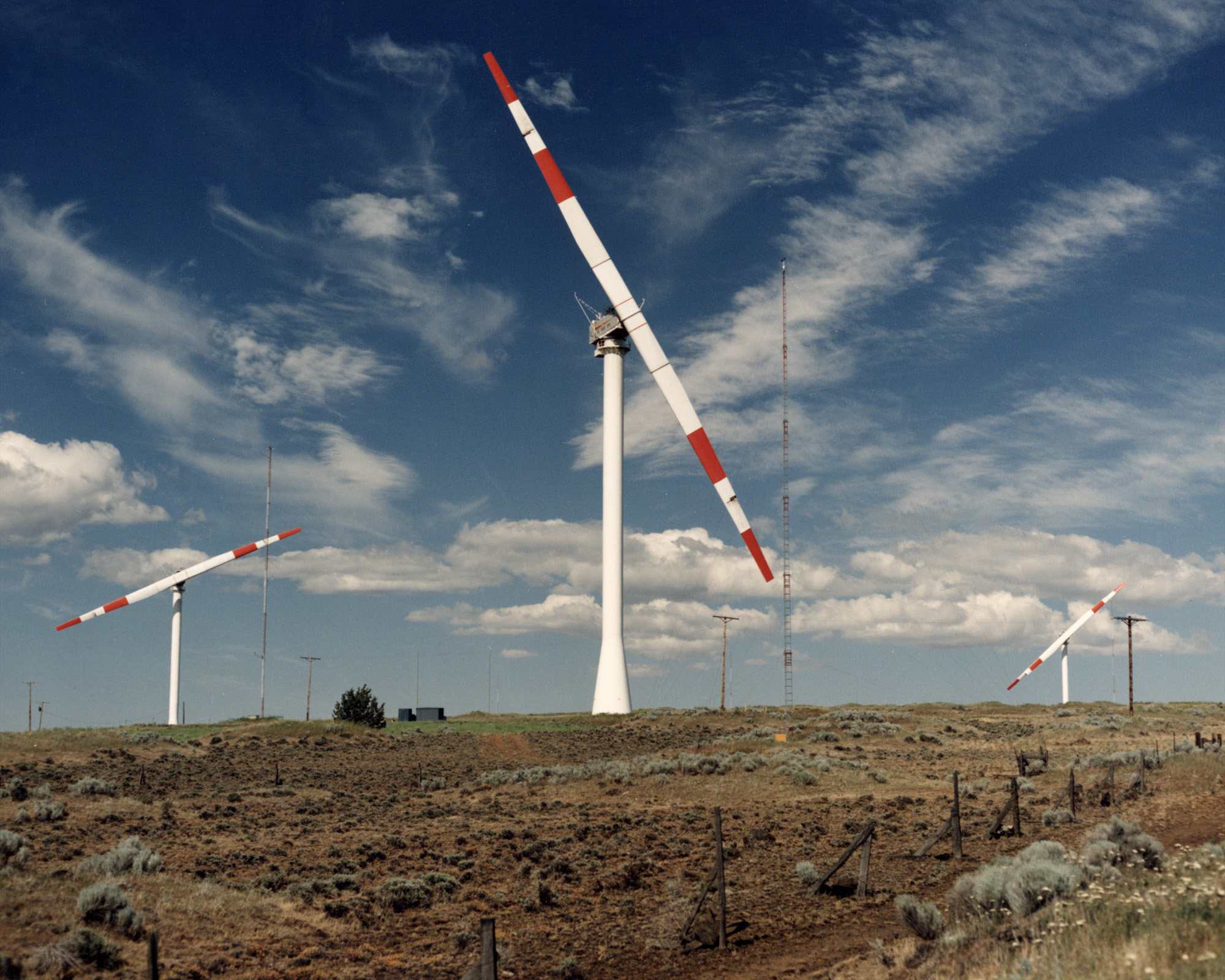
Mod-2 (2.5 MW wind turbine cluster in Goodnoe Hills, Washington)

== Wind turbines and careers with other companies ==
In January 1970, Doman went to work for Boeing Vertol – Boeing's helicopter division in Philadelphia. There he continued his helicopter pioneering, working on U.S. Army-funded research and patenting additional design improvements for helicopter speed increases and vibration reductions. The 1973 arab oil embargo triggered a great interest in wind energy at Boeing and numerous other companies. While continuing his helicopter innovations, Doman began to conduct wind turbine research. He adapted computer simulation models designed for helicopters to study wind turbines. Doman and his team then built scale-model wind turbines to test them in a wind tunnel normally used for helicopters and airplanes. Doman soon understood the similarities and key differences between wind turbines and helicopters. Wind turbine designers with no experience in helicopters might not know the lessons-learned from the history of helicopter technology, but by the mid-1970s Doman had more than 30 years of such learning that was directly applicable to wind turbines. Boeing's MOD-2 with the Doman-conceived flexible design, two-bladed wind turbine with a teeter hinge, became a flagship achievement in a 7-year NASA managed wind energy program for the U.S. Department of Energy and the U.S. Department of the Interior.

In January 1978, Doman returned to Connecticut as Chief Systems Engineer of the wind energy program at Hamilton Standard division of United Technologies. Drawing on Doman's extensive knowledge of rotor dynamics for both helicopters and wind turbines, United Technologies designed and built two of the largest wind turbines ever built up to that time (i.e. WTS-3, WTS-4). Key features of those turbines, in addition to their size, were the use of only two blades (instead of three, which is more common) and the mounting of the blades on a teeter hinge hub. This was analogous to Doman's use of the gimbaled hub on his helicopters, which had 4-bladed rotors. One turbine (WTS-4) was installed and successfully tested at Medicine Bow, Wyoming, and the other (WTS-3) in Sweden. The WTS-4 wind turbine held the world power output record for over 20 years. Throughout all the research studies and the testing of the actual turbines, there was rapid evolution in Doman's thinking on the best design concepts. However, when oil prices plummeted in the mid-1980s, United Technologies deemed the wind energy market to be uneconomical and halted the program.

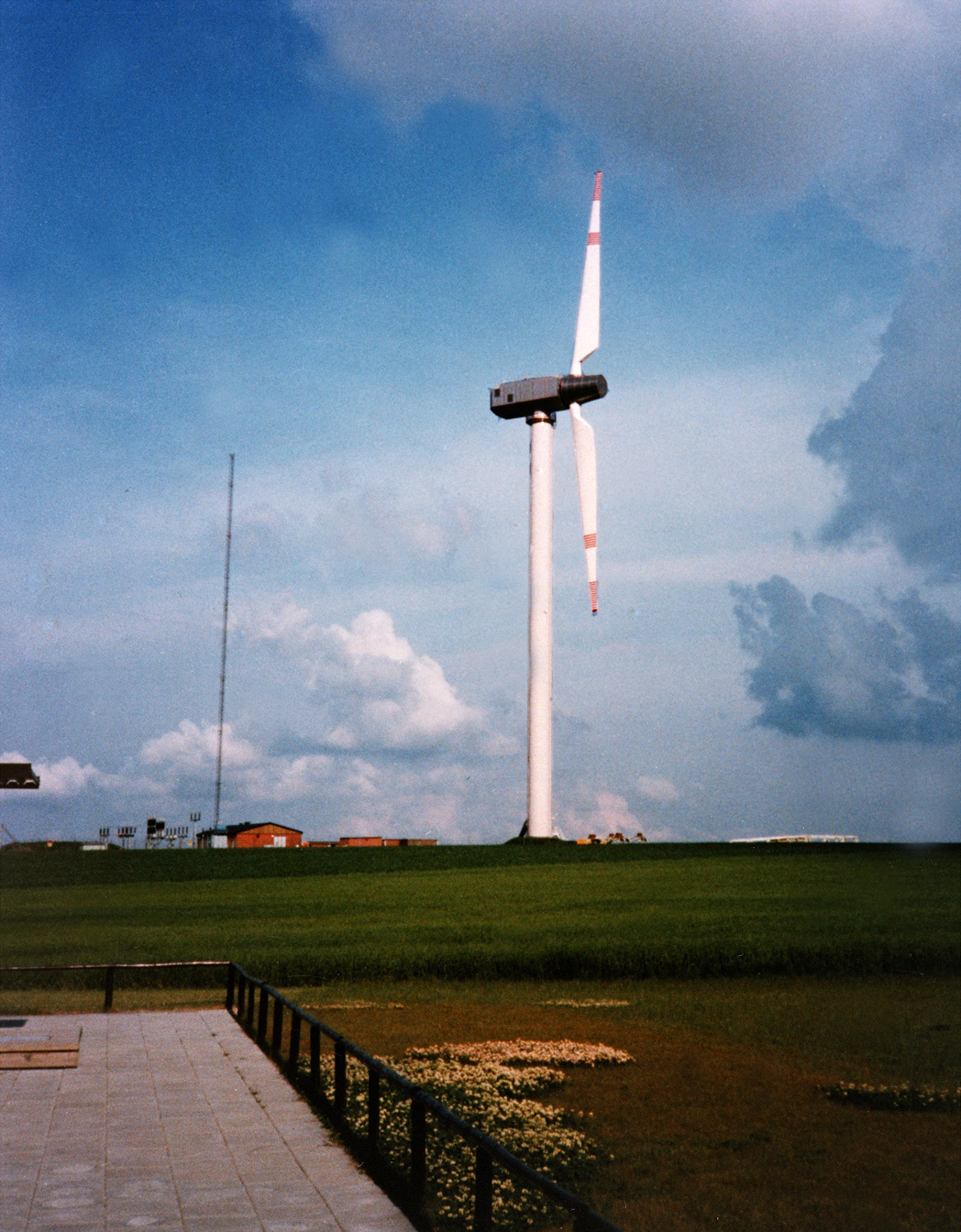
WTS-4 (4 MW wind turbine in Medicine Bow, Wyoming. This turbine held the world power output record for over 20 years)

The Italian government took notice of Doman's work, and in July 1987, when Doman retired from United Technologies, he was hired by Aeritalia (the Italian manufacturer later known as Alenia) and moved to Rome to head Italy's wind energy program. In this program, Doman applied his latest thinking to a new machine, considerably improved over the WTS-4 and WTS-3 machines he had designed for installation in Wyoming and Sweden respectively. Under Doman's leadership a team of Italian engineers designed the Gamma 60 wind turbine. The Gamma 60 wind turbine was the world's first variable speed wind turbine with a teetering hinge. Three Gamma 60 wind turbines were manufactured, and one was erected and successfully tested from 1992 - 1997 on the Mediterranean island of Sardinia. There had been intentions to build many more Gamma 60 wind turbines, but Italian politics and a lack of urgency due to relatively low oil prices in the 1990s resulted in the program being cancelled.

In 2003, Doman and Italian nuclear mechanical engineer Silvestro Caruso formed a new company, Gamma Ventures Inc., and bought two unused turbines, the engineering drawings, and manufacturing rights from the Italian Gamma 60 project. In 2007, Gamma Ventures sold a turbine and manufacturing rights to the Dutch company – Blue H Technologies – that was adapting offshore oil platform technology to put wind turbines on floating platforms in deep water far from shore. Blue H Technologies installed the world's first floating offshore wind turbine in 2007 in the Southern Adriatic Sea with a two-bladed wind turbine. After some revisions in corporate structures and plans, the Gamma rights were eventually transferred to a new company, Seawind Ocean Technology B.V., which is working on placing turbines with Gamma-type rotors on concrete offshore support structures, aiming to do so in numerous locations around the world.

== The persistent innovator ==
Doman remained active right up to the end of his life in 2016; thoroughly engaged in business, technical strategies, and analysis toward superior wind turbine performance at less cost in the application of his novel rotor technologies. He was also an avid supporter of the New England Air Museum (in Windsor Locks, Connecticut), where two of his helicopters – the converted R-6 (Doman-LZ1A) and a Doman LZ-5/YH-31 – are on display.

Of the original 6 helicopter companies in the United States, Doman was the last company founder to pass away. He was one of the few helicopter pioneers to have transferred rotor dynamics technology from helicopters to wind turbines.

An offshore wind energy project announced in February 2017, involving Seawind Ocean Technology B.V., aims to demonstrate the wind energy applications put forth by Glidden Doman, Anton Flettner, and Kurt Hohenemser in harsh wind and sea conditions. Doman worked through to his final days to ensure that one day wind-generated electricity will be produced in great quantities, much less expensively than now, using his advanced rotor technology concepts.

== Photo gallery ==
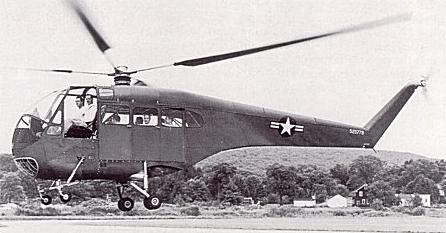
United States Army - Doman LZ-5/YH-31 helicopter

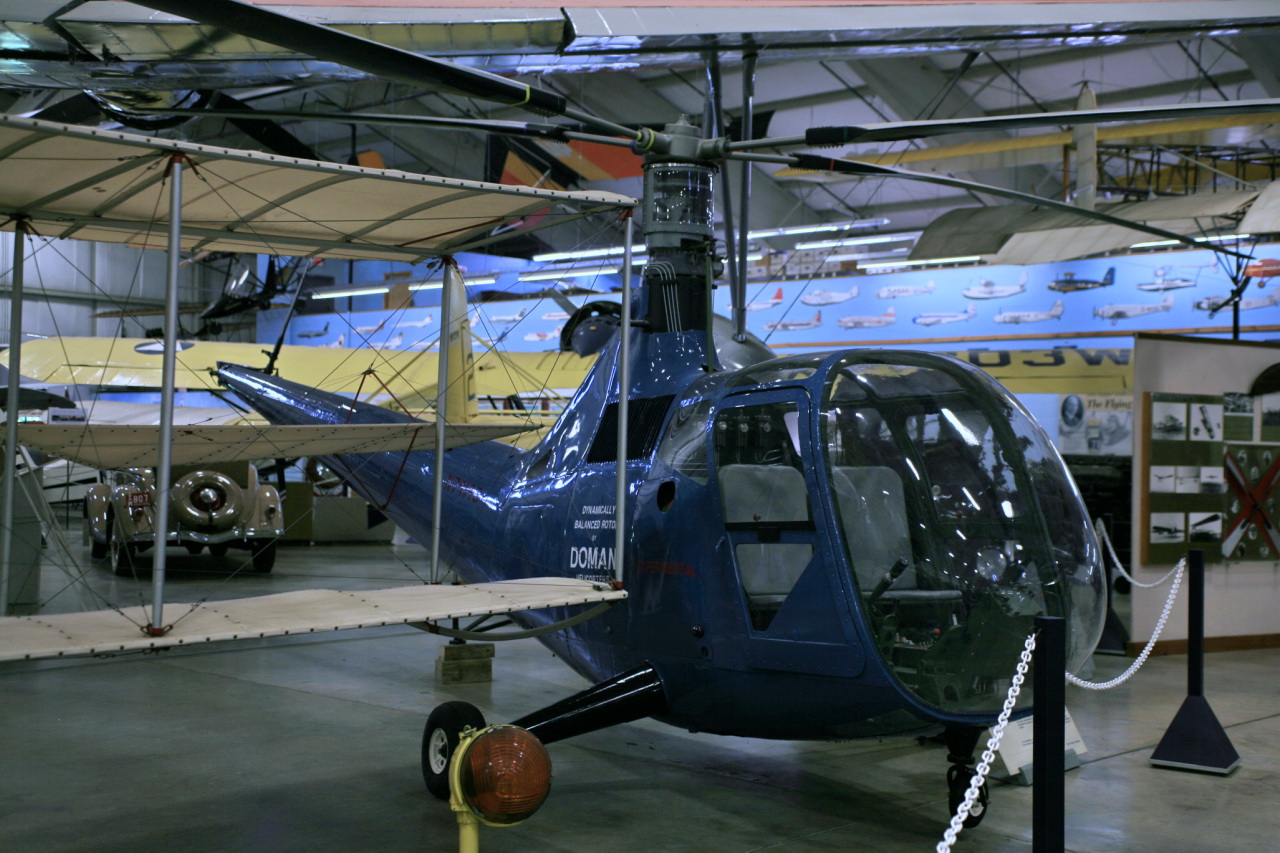
Sikorsky R-6 Doman Conversion

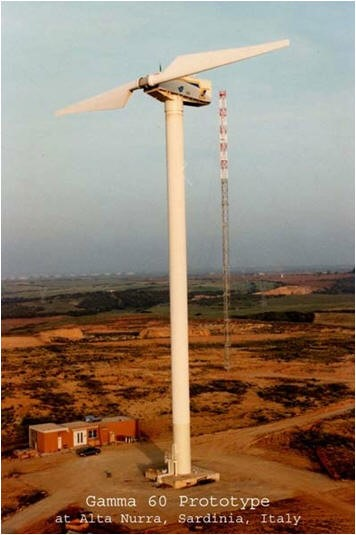
Gamma 60 - 1.5 MW prototype

== Patents awarded by the United States Patent Office ==
1. U.S. patent 2,451,541 – Dynamic balancer for rotor blades (filed on May 24, 1945, granted on October 19, 1948)
2. U.S. patent 2,550,538 – Directional and trim control for rotary wing aircraft (filed on August 9, 1946, granted on April 24, 1951)
3. U.S. patent 2,648,387 – Rotor head (filed on June 27, 1946, granted on August 11, 1953)
4. U.S. patent 2,687,856 – Gyroscopic control of sustaining rotors (filed on July 18, 1946, granted on August 31, 1954)
5. U.S. patent 2,716,889 – Method of determining and adjusting the aerodynamic pitching moment of a full-sized aerodynamic member and apparatus therefor (filed on November 25, 1952, granted on September 6, 1955)
6. U.S. patent 2,810,443 – Rotor head and swash plate means combination (filed on November 18, 1950, granted on October 22, 1957
7. U.S. patent 2,827,251 – Aircraft frame with large side openings (filed on April 2, 1952, granted on March 18, 1958)
8. U.S. patent 2,959,230 – Mechanical directional and trim control for helicopters (filed on August 16, 1951, granted on November 8, 1960)
9. U.S. patent 2,978,038 – Swash plate operating mechanism and combination with swash plate (filed on Mar 11, 1958, granted on April 4, 1961)
10. U.S. patent 3,007,530 – Helicopter rotor head (filed on July 29, 1958, granted on November 7, 1961)
11. U.S. patent 3,007,654 – Rotor and blade for rotorcraft (filed on December 27, 1956, granted on November 7, 1961)
12. U.S. patent 3,082,826 – Rotor head with collective pitch control (filed on July 2, 1958, granted on March 26, 1963)
13. U.S. patent 3,087,690 – Rotor with two joints in drive shaft (filed on January 30, 1961, granted on April 30, 1963)
14. U.S. patent 4,004,757 – Oscillation damper for the hub of a rotorcraft rotor and its combination with a rotorcraft (filed on October 16, 1975, granted on January 25, 1977)
15. U.S. patent 4,073,600 – Damping mechanism for the rotor hub of a helicopter for ground resonance and waddle and its combination with the rotor (filed on June 14, 1976, granted on February 14, 1978)
16. U.S. patent 4,329,117 – Wind turbine with drive train disturbance isolation (filed on April 22, 1980, granted on May 11, 1982)
17. U.S. patent 4,353,681 – Wind turbine with yaw trimming (filed on May 19, 1980, granted on October 12, 1982)
18. U.S. patent 4,515,525 – Minimization of the effects of yaw oscillations in wind turbines (filed on November 8, 1982, granted on May 7, 1985)
19. U.S. patent 4,695,736 – Variable speed wind turbine (filed on November 18, 1985, granted on September 22, 1987)

== See also ==
- Seawind Ocean Technology
- Gamma 60 wind turbine
- NASA wind turbines
- Floating wind turbine
- Anton Flettner
- Kurt Hohenemser
- Variable speed wind turbine
- Offshore wind power
