= Nordic Windpower =

Nordic Windpower was a privately owned manufacturer of wind turbines based in Kansas City, Missouri in the United States. Nordic Windpower filed for liquidation in the Kansas City Bankruptcy court in October 2012.

== History ==
The company had roots in a Swedish government wind turbine research and development program started 1975. Early prototypes in this program were erected in Maglarp, Skåne and Näsudden, Gotland. Nordic Windpower's N1000 turbine was designed with inspiration from the Maglarp prototype and has two blades rather than the more conventional three.

In the 1990s the company became privately owned Nordic Windpower AB. After selling only 5 turbines it became a United States entity in 2005 and promptly sold 7 turbines. It received a $16 million loan guarantee from the United States Department of Energy. Its private owners were Khosla Ventures, New Enterprise Associates and Novus Energy Partners, Goldman Sachs, Impax Asset Management, I2BF Venture Capital, Pulsar Energy Capital and other investors.

Before moving to Kansas City it had its corporate headquarters in Berkeley, California with a production facility in Pocatello, Idaho. Engineering design was carried out in Bristol, United Kingdom. In December 2010 Nordic announced its plans to move to Missouri to be closer to its target market and was offered $5.6 million in conditional incentive packages to relocate to Kansas City International Airport. Nordic temporarily occupied 50,000 square feet (4,600 m^{2}) of the 1,700,000-square-foot (160,000 m^{2}) former American Airlines Overhaul facility at the airport which the airline had abandoned. It was scheduled to be the first tenant at the KCI Intermodal Business Centre being developed by Trammell Crow Company at the airport.
