= NASA wind turbines =

United States electrical power research program

NASA experimental wind turbines drawn to the same scale

Starting in 1975, NASA managed a program for the United States Department of Energy and the United States Department of Interior to develop utility-scale wind turbines for electric power, in response to the increase in oil prices. A number of the world's largest wind turbines were developed and tested under this pioneering program. The program was an attempt to leap well beyond the then-current state of the art of wind turbine generators, and developed a number of technologies later adopted by the wind turbine industry. The development of the commercial industry however was delayed by a significant decrease in competing energy prices during the 1980s.

== Program origin ==
In 1974, partially in response to the increase in oil price after the 1973 oil crisis, the Energy Research and Development Administration (ERDA), later part of United States Department of Energy, appointed a department under the direction of Louis Divone to fund research into utility-scale wind turbines. NASA, through its Lewis Research Center in Sandusky Ohio (now the Glenn Research Center) was assigned the task of coordination of development by large contractors such as General Electric, Westinghouse, United Technologies and Boeing.

In 1975 NASA designed and built its first prototype wind turbine, the 100 kW Mod-0 in Sandusky Ohio, with funding from the National Science Foundation and ERDA. The Mod-0 was modeled after the light weight two-bladed research turbine by Austrian Ulrich Hütter. The two-bladed wind turbine with flexible or teetered rotor hubs characterized the NASA-led program. NASA and its contractors found that two blades can produce essentially equivalent energy as three blades but at a savings of the cost and weight of a blade. Two-blade rotors turn faster than equivalent three-blade rotors, reducing the ratio in the gearbox. Flexibility in the rotor minimizes the transfer of bending loads into the drive train; none of the NASA wind turbines experienced gearbox failures that are often a problem for rigid rotor systems in use today.

The NASA program hosted technical conferences, inviting international partners. NASA even helped refurbish and operate the Danish three-bladed Gedser wind turbine between 1977 and 1979, so that its operation and characteristics could be studied as a model for larger units. This 1957 unit designed by Johannes Juul generated 200 kW for 11 years, and used a three-bladed upwind rotor with a lattice tower and blades supported partly by internal guy wires. The effort produce research data on its aerodynamic, electrical, and mechanical characteristics. An important result of this effort was the development of an engineering design model used by the industry for passive power control.

Larger wind turbine units achieve economies of scale. NASA research and prototypes demonstrated that there were considerable scaling challenges in structural strength, fatigue, speed control, and aerodynamics. In the 1980s most wind turbines were small units up to 25 kW rating. Studies carried out by NASA's contractors suggested that much larger units would be required, on the order of 1 MW or more, for economic production of electricity by utilities. Although the largest-diameter sets of propeller blades then in use were for helicopters, which spanned only 46 feet, it was projected that large blade sets, covering 200 to 300 feet in diameter, would be feasible to build and would produce the lowest cost of energy.

NASA/DOE/DOI Wind Turbines
Model	Rating kW	Swept diameter, m	Description	Prime contractor	Years in service	Remarks
MOD 0	100	38	Two blades, downwind and upwind	NASA design with Lockheed blades	1975–1982	Prototype only at Sandusky
MOD 0A	200	38	Two blades, downwind	Westinghouse	1977–1984	Four units installed for field trials
MOD 1	2000	61	Two blades, downwind	General Electric	1979–1981	One installed at Howard Knob. World's first turbine to achieve 2 MW power output.
MOD 2	2500	91	Two blades, upwind	Boeing	1982–1988	Three installed near Goodnoe Hills as a wind farm. Fourth and fifth units sold to utilities, Pacific Gas and Electric demolished in 1988
WTS 4	4000	79.2	Two blades, downwind	United Technologies	1982–1994	One turbine installed at Medicine Bow, Wyoming and another smaller 3 MW WTS 3 version in Sweden
MOD 5A	7300	121.5	Two blades, upwind	General Electric		Never built
MOD 5B	3200	97.5	Two blades, upwind	Boeing	1987–1996	One installed at Oahu, Hawaii

== MOD-0 and MOD-0A ==
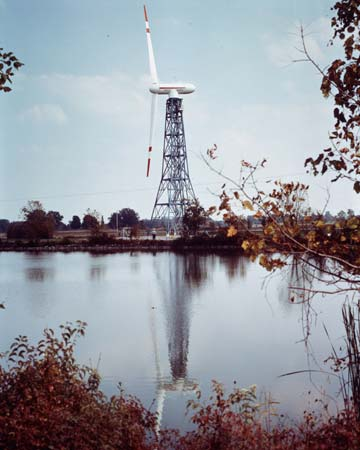
The NASA MOD-0 research wind turbine in Sandusky, Ohio

The first design was MOD-0, built near the Lewis Research Center in Sandusky, Ohio and operational in September 1975. It served as a test bed for development of many concepts for use in larger units. This design had a 38-metre diameter downwind two-bladed rotor, coupled to a synchronous generator, with a power rating of 100 kW at 8 m/s wind speed. A speed increaser stepped up the 40 r/min of the turbine to drive an 1800 r/min generator. The power output of the machine was regulated by pitching the rotor blades.

The initial MOD-0 blades were made by Lockheed, out of aluminum. Structural problems surfaced almost immediately at the root end of the blades. Several significant changes and efforts were performed to address this. An investigation revealed that unexpectedly high cyclic loads were the result of a significant blockage of the wind by the complex truss tower structure. This caused the aerodynamic loads on the downwind rotor rapidly change. To correct this blockage, the access stairs were removed from the center of the tower. A major blade material program was started that assessed fiberglass composite, steel, wood and even concrete. NASA approached the Gougeon Brothers, Inc. of Michigan to apply their boat material technology to wind turbines. The resulting wood and composite blades replaced the aluminum blades on the Mod-0 (and later Mod-0A), eliminating the blade root structural problems. Gougeon Brothers successfully commercialized their products into the wind turbine industry with sales around the world.

Many experiments were done with MOD-0, including brief operation with the rotor blades upwind of the tower, and a trial of a single blade for the turbine rotor. It tested the first variable speed generators as well prior to their use in the 3.2 MW Mod-5B and later throughout the industry. The Mod-0 was also used to test the first steel shell towers, now the dominant tower design. The design challenge was to take weight and cost out of the tower while safely passing through a resonance of the soft structure during startup.

Operating experience with the prototype MOD-0 provided the basis for construction of several demonstration units designated the MOD-0A. These were similar to the prototype with the same rotor size, but rated at 200 kW at slightly higher wind speed. Westinghouse was appointed as prime contractor responsible for the overall construction. Units were installed at Clayton New Mexico in 1977, Culebra, Puerto Rico in 1978, Block Island, Rhode Island in 1979 and the fourth at Kahaku Point Hawaii in 1980.

== MOD-1 ==
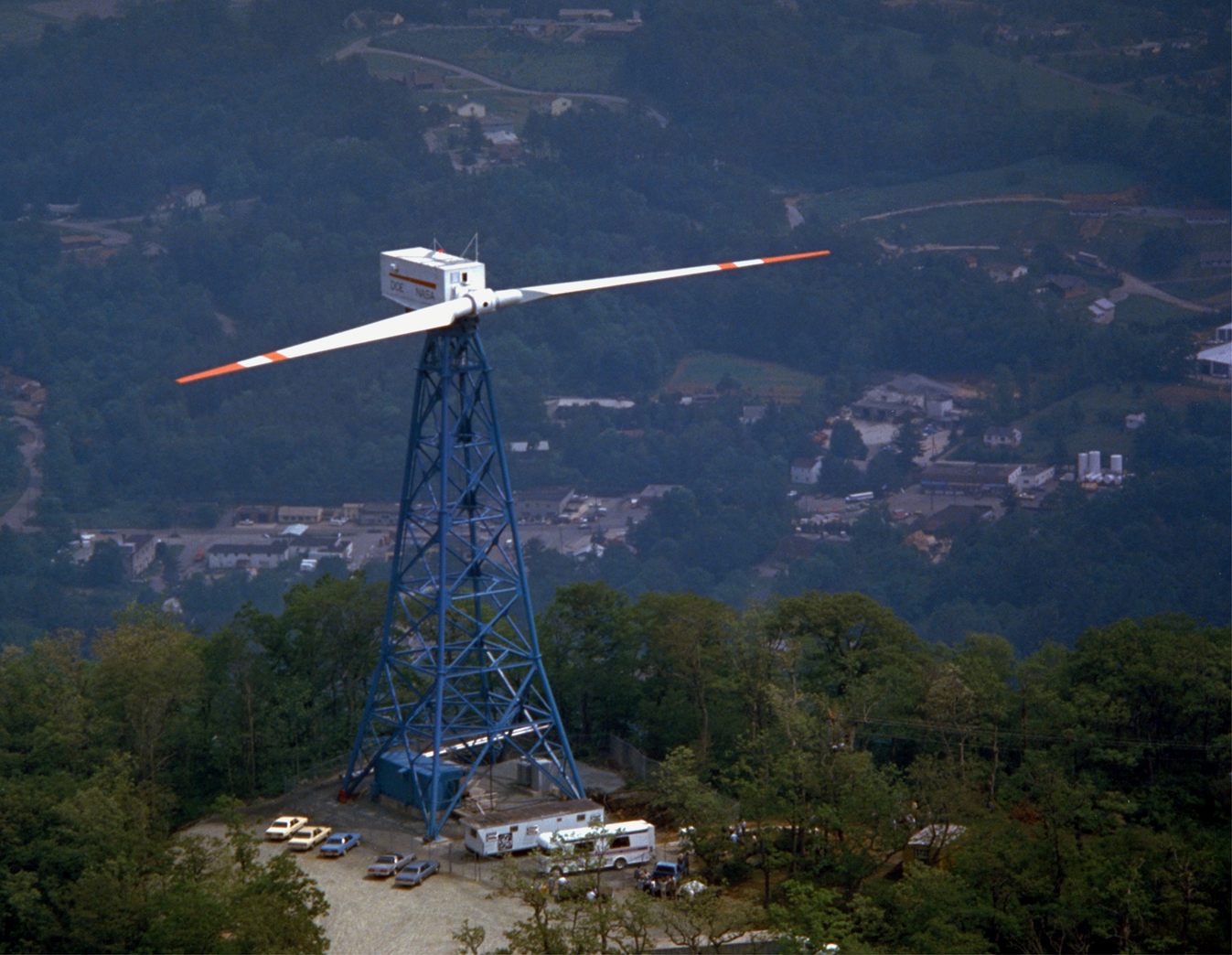
The NASA/GE MOD-1 wind turbine in Boone, North Carolina was the world's first turbine to produce 2 MW

NASA contracted with General Electric in 1978 to scale up from the MOD-0A with a 10-fold increase in power. The Mod-1 was the first wind turbine in the world to produce 2 megawatts and also General Electric's first wind turbine. The Danish da:Vindkraftværket Tvindkraft with a hub height of 46 meters above the ground, a larger rotor and a rating at a higher wind speed, had a capacity of 2000 kW but never achieved 2 MW power output of the Mod-1. The Mod-1's design weight prevented it from becoming a competitive commercial product, but a prototype was installed and run at Howard's Knob near Boone, North Carolina. The quick design cycle to multi-megawatt size based on the first generation Mod-0 caused technical and operational challenges. Low-frequency noise from the heavy truss tower blocking the wind to the downwind rotor caused problems to residences located close by. With additional pressure of a reduction in federal program funding, the turbine was dismantled in 1983.

== MOD-2 ==
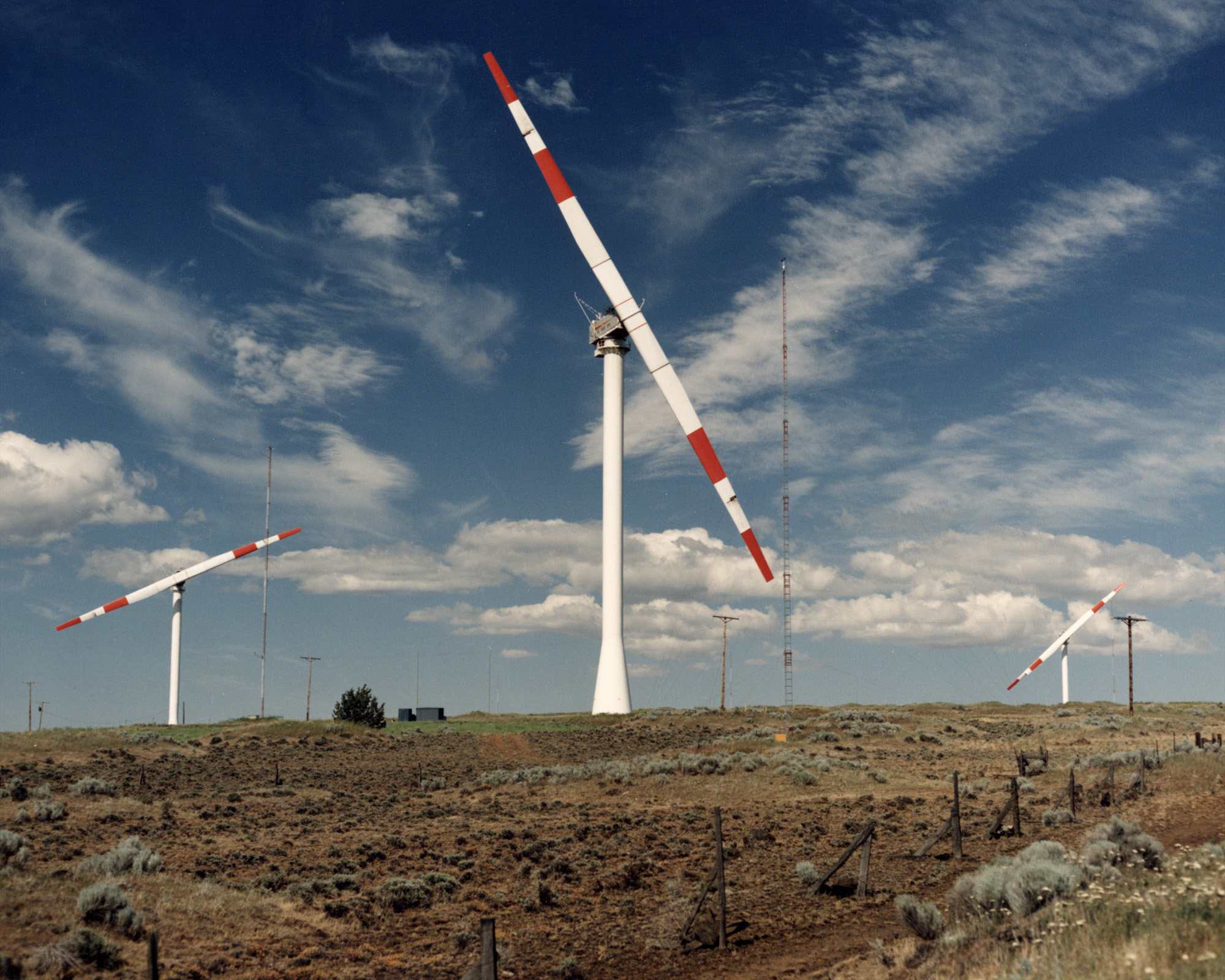
The three MOD-2 wind turbines pictured above in Goodnoe Hills during 1981 had a total generation capacity of 7.5 megawatts.

In 1977 Boeing won the NASA and US-DOE contract for the design, fabrication, construction, installation and testing of several 2.5-megawatt wind turbine models in the United States. The first four MOD-2 models went into operation during the early 1980s. The groundbreaking for the first three turbines was held on April 11, 1980, at Goodnoe Hills, Washington, to mark the start of construction. The first turbine was to become operational in December. On September 2, 1982, a fourth began operating at Medicine Bow, Wyoming. The Bonneville Power Administration bought the generated electricity of the Goodnoe Hills turbines and integrated it into the regional power grid. During the periods of May 1981, the three turbines at the Goodnoe Hills site formed the first wind farm in the world. The Goodnoe Hills site was primarily a research project for Boeing, Bonneville Power Administration, NASA and the Battelle Memorial Institute. The Solar Energy Research Institute also evaluated the suitability of megawatt-class wind turbines as a source of electricity. During 1986, the MOD-2 wind turbines of Goodnoe Hills were dismantled. In 1985, the last full year of operation, the combined electrical output of the three turbines was 8,251 megawatt-hours. The Medicine Bow MOD-2 wind turbine was sold for scrap in 1987. In 2008, the Goodnoe Hills Wind Farm opened on the same site with 47 REpower 2.0 MW wind turbines for a combined nameplate capacity of 94 MW. enXco/Power Holdings owns the wind farm, with PacifiCorp as the power purchaser.

== WTS-4 ==
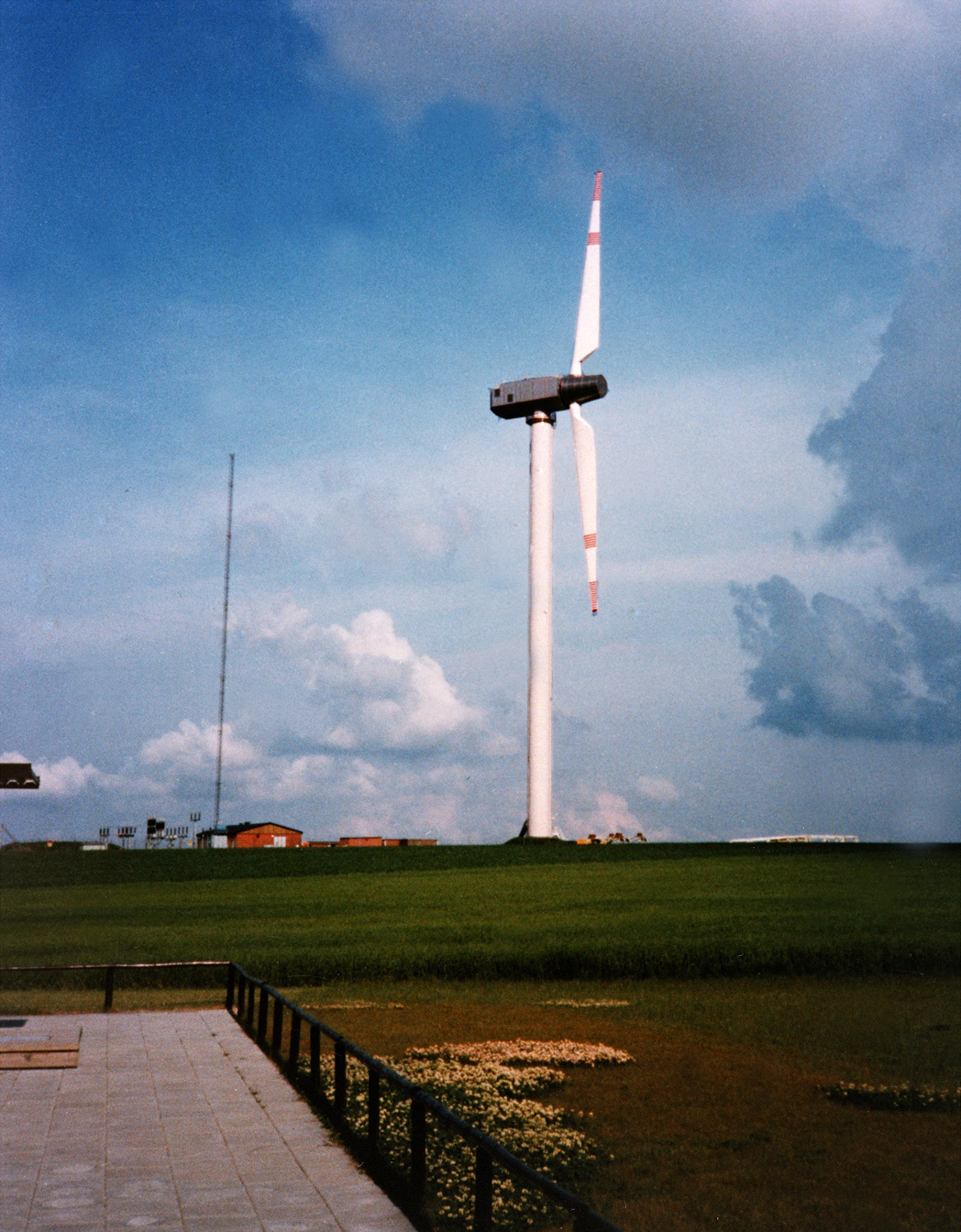
The NASA/DOI/United Technologies 4 MW WTS-4 wind turbine at Medicine Bow Wyoming held the world power output record for over 20 years.

The WTS-4 (4 megawatt) wind turbine in Wyoming was designed by United Technologies (Hamilton Standard Division), under the technical management of NASA and with funding from the United States Department of Interior. The WTS-4 was placed into operation in Medicine Bow, Wyoming in 1982. It featured a "soft" steel tube tower, fiberglass blades, torsional springs and dashpots in the drivetrain, and a flexible teetered hub. To this day, the WTS-4 is the most powerful wind turbine to have operated in the US and it held the world record for power output for over 20 years. A second commercial prototype with a smaller generator (3 megawatts) designated the WTS-3 was constructed and operated in Sweden. Glidden Doman was Hamilton Standard's System Design Manager for the WTS-4 project and was hired by the Swedish government to initiate the WTS-3 project. In 2014, Glidden Doman co-founded Seawind Ocean Technology B.V. together with Martin Jakubowski and Silvestro Caruso to deploy a new generation of floating wind technologies based upon system design modifications to the WTS-4 wind turbine and subsequent 1.5 MW Gamma 60 wind turbine in 1991.

== MOD-5B ==
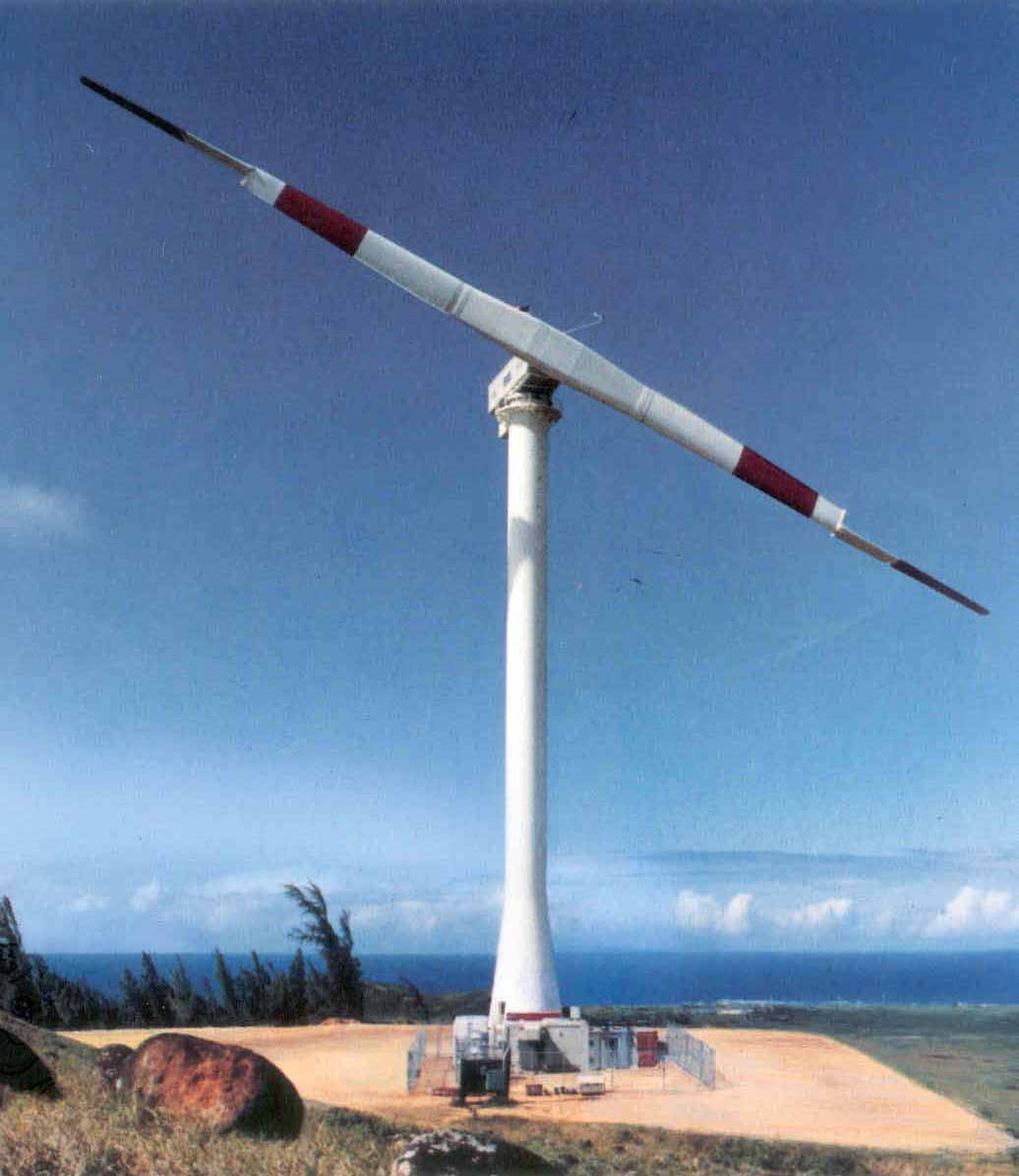
This 97.53 m (320.0 ft) diameter, two-bladed wind turbine was the largest operating wind turbine in the world during the early 1990s.

The MOD-5B wind turbine, built in 1987, was the largest operating wind turbine in the world in the 1990s. The contract to build the Mod-5B was awarded to Boeing in 1980 and it was installed on Oahu in 1987. With a rated capacity of 3.2 megawatts, it weighed 426,000 kg (939,000 lb) and had a 97.53 m (320.0 ft) diameter two-blade rotor on a 60 m (200 ft) steel tower. Early operation of the Mod-5B demonstrated a good availability of 95 percent for the new first-unit wind turbine. Early in 1988, operation of the turbine was transferred to Hawaiian Electric Industries, then to the Makani Uwila Power Corporations (MUPC), and kept in service intermittently until late in 1996. Because of financial difficulties, the wind turbine was shut down, along with the rest of MUPC, and passed to the property owner, Campbell Estates. Campbell Estates decided to disassemble the unit and sell it for scrap. The DOE salvaged the drive train gearbox and generator in July 1998.

== Program legacy ==
None of the NASA prototypes became commonly produced as commercial generators because the purpose of the program was to develop the technology and support the emerging industry. Many of the technologies such as doubly fed variable speed generators, light weight tubular towers, and the engineering design tools used in the wind industry today were developed and pioneered by the NASA program. Total cost of the program between 1974 and 1992 was $330 million. For reference, the global wind market had reached $47 billion annually by 2008. General Electric, Boeing Engineering and Construction, Westinghouse and United Technologies were the commercial partners on the program, some of whom are involved in the wind industry today. Although it has widely been stated that no commercial designs were produced, NASA's industry partners did indeed produce commercial turbines during this program such as the Boeing Mod-2 (described earlier) and Westinghouse 600 kW turbines at Kahuku wind farm in Hawaii. When oil prices declined by a factor of three from 1980 through the early 1990s during what came to be known as the "1980s oil glut", many turbine manufacturers, both large and small, left the business. The commercial sales of the NASA/Boeing Mod-5B, for example, came to an end in 1987 when Boeing Engineering and Construction announced they were "planning to leave the market because low oil prices are keeping windmills for electricity generation uneconomical." A summary of the DOE/NASA large wind turbine program was published in 1984.

== See also ==
- Enercon E-126
- History of wind power
- Wind power in the United States
- Smith–Putnam wind turbine
