= Doman LZ-5 =

Utility helicopter prototype

LZ-5
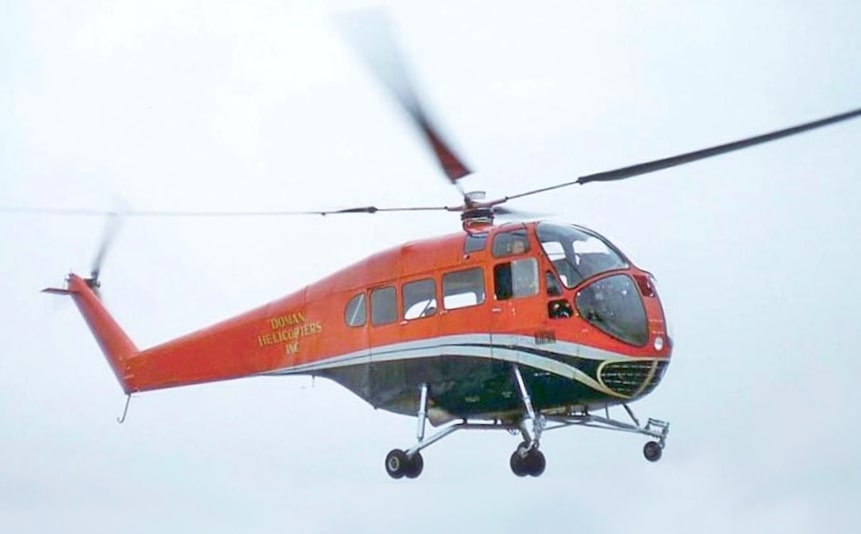

General information
- Type: Utility helicopter
- Manufacturer: Doman Helicopters
- Designer: Glidden Doman
- Status: Prototypes only
- Number built: 3

History
- First flight: 27 April 1953

The Doman LZ-5 is a utility helicopter developed in the United States in the early 1950s by Doman Helicopters Inc. of Danbury, Connecticut. Despite the procurement of international manufacturing agreements, no series production of the aircraft ever occurred, and only three prototypes were built. Two of these were purchased by the United States Army as the YH-31, but eventually becoming VH-31.

== Development ==
Like the preceding LZ-1 through LZ-4, the LZ-5 utilized designer Glidden Doman's unorthodox gimbaled rotor head system, which featured the elimination of rotor hinges and dampers and included blades of soft-in-plane dynamic design. The servo control system was entirely contained within the rotor head, with no external oil tanks or plumbing. The tail rotor was also hingeless and free floating to eliminate stresses in rapid tail rotor turns. In other ways, it had a conventional helicopter main rotor and tail rotor configuration. The pilot and co-pilot were seated over the engine, which was in the nose, and a six-passenger compartment was located behind them. The engine was cooled by exhaust ejectors, producing an energy saving that increased payload by 800 pounds. The aircraft featured wheeled quadricycle undercarriage, the main units of which carried dual wheels.

The first prototype (registration N13458) flew on 27 April 1953, and by the end of 1955, two machines had been delivered to the Army (52-5779 and 52-5780). Eventually, the Army concluded that they had no requirement for an additional piston-powered helicopter model in this size category, and no further order was placed. After extensive flight testing and pilot training by the Army, one of the prototypes was taken over by the Navy for a helicopter flight research program at the Patuxent River Naval Air Test Center. Later that aircraft was re-purchased by the Doman company and used in its commercial sales efforts.

Doman continued with development, building another LZ-5 aircraft in a joint venture with Fleet in Canada. The LZ-5 helicopters were simultaneously Type Certificated in the U.S. and Canada in 1954. The third helicopter flew extensively in Canada under Canadian registration CF-IBG and in the United States, France, and Italy under U.S. registration N812. It flew in the Paris Air Show in 1960. This aircraft was also modified with the installation of full blind flight instrumentation, which was demonstrated extensively in the effort to sell it as a trainer. The aircraft thus equipped was advertised as the D-10. The planned production version would have been modified with a turbo-charged engine and designated as the D-10B. Doman sold production rights for military versions to Hiller and for the Italian market to Ambrosini.

Ultimately, none of these plans were to eventuate, and the LZ-5 never entered production.

== Operational history ==
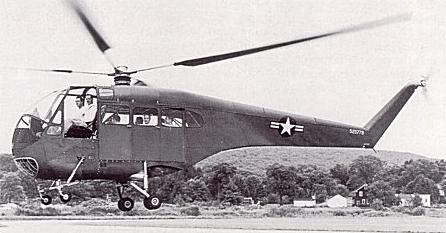
The YH-31 prototype for the US Military

After the demise of Doman Helicopters Inc. in 1969, the second Army prototype was taken to California for display at the Hiller Aviation Museum, founded by Stanley Hiller, Jr. That helicopter was returned to Connecticut in 2009 and is on display at the New England Air Museum in Windsor Locks, Connecticut.

== Variants ==
- LZ-5 (3 built)
  - YH-31 - LZ-5 for military evaluation, Army designated VH-31 (2 built)
  - LZ-5-2 - civil version, intended as prototype for production as D-10A (1 built)
- D-10B - Lycoming O-720 turbocharged engine; (proposed production version of LZ-5)

== Specifications (LZ-5) ==
Data from Jane's All the World's Aircraft 1956–57

General characteristics

- Crew: 2 pilots
- Capacity:
  - 6 passengers or
  - 4 stretchers or
  - 2,205 lb (1,000 kg) cargo
- Length: 37 ft 10 in (11.53 m) (fuselage length)
- Height: 10 ft 5 in (3.18 m)
- Empty weight: 2,900 lb (1,315 kg) (stripped configuration), 3,250 lb (1,470 kg) normal empty weight
- Max takeoff weight: 5,200 lb (2,359 kg)
- Fuel capacity: 119 US gal (99 imp gal; 450 L)
- Powerplant: 1 × Lycoming SO-580-A1 air-cooled eight-cylinder horizontally-opposed engine, 400 hp (300 kW)
- Main rotor diameter: 48 ft (15 m)
- Main rotor area: 1,810 sq ft (168 m^{2})

Performance

- Maximum speed: 104 mph (167 km/h, 90 kn)
- Cruise speed: 99 mph (159 km/h, 86 kn)
- Endurance: 3.7 hr
- Service ceiling: 11,500 ft (3,500 m)
- Rate of climb: 850 ft/min (4.3 m/s)
- Mission radius: 240 mi (3.9×10^{14} nm; 390 km) (retrieving two stretcher patients)
- Hover ceiling: 4,000 ft (1,200 m) (in ground effect)
