= Variable speed wind turbine =

Type of wind turbine

A variable speed wind turbine is one which is specifically designed to operate over a wide range of rotor speeds. It is in direct contrast to fixed speed wind turbine where the rotor speed is approximately constant. The reason to vary the rotor speed is to capture the maximum aerodynamic power in the wind, as the wind speed varies. The aerodynamic efficiency, or coefficient of power, $C_p$ for a fixed blade pitch angle is obtained by operating the wind turbine at the optimal tip-speed ratio as shown in the following graph.

Tip-speed ratio is given by the following expression,

$\lambda = \frac{\omega R}{v}$

where $\omega$ is the rotor speed (in radians per second), $R$ is the radius of the rotor, and $v$ is the wind speed. As the wind speed varies, the rotor speed must be varied to maintain peak efficiency.

== Background ==
Before the need to connect wind turbines to the grid, few turbines were fixed-speed. This was not a problem because turbines did not have to be synchronized with the frequency of the grid.

All grid-connected wind turbines, from the first one in 1939 until the development of variable-speed grid-connected wind turbines in the 1970s, were fixed-speed wind turbines. As of 2003, nearly all grid-connected wind turbines operate at an exactly constant speed (synchronous generators) or within a few percent of constant speed (induction generators).

== History ==
The Gamma 60 wind turbine - a 1.5 MW two-bladed yaw control turbine, which is ongoing further development by Seawind Ocean Technology B.V., was the world's first variable speed wind turbine with a teeter hinge.

=== Torque Rotor-speed diagrams ===
For a wind turbine, the power harvested is given by the following formula:

$P = \frac{1}{2}\rho\pi R^2 v^3 C_p(\lambda)$

where $P$ is the aerodynamic power and $\rho$ is the density of the air. The power coefficient is a representation of how much of the available power in the wind is captured by the wind turbine and can be looked up in the graph above.

The torque, $Q$, on the rotor shaft is given by the ratio of the power extracted to the rotor speed:

$Q = \frac{P}{\omega}$

Thus we can get the following expressions for torque and power:

$P = \frac{1}{2\lambda^3}\rho\pi R^5 \omega^3 C_p(\lambda)$

and

$Q = \frac{1}{2\lambda^3}\rho\pi R^5 \omega^2 C_p(\lambda) = \frac{1}{2\lambda}\rho\pi R^3 v^2 C_p(\lambda)$

From the above equation, we can construct a torque-speed diagram for a wind turbine. This consists of multiple curves: a constant power curve which plots the relationship between torque and rotor speed for constant power (green curve); constant wind speed curves, which plot the relationship between torque and rotor speed for constant wind speeds (dashed grey curves); and constant efficiency curves, which plot the relationship between torque and rotor speed for constant efficiencies, $C_p$. This diagram is presented below:

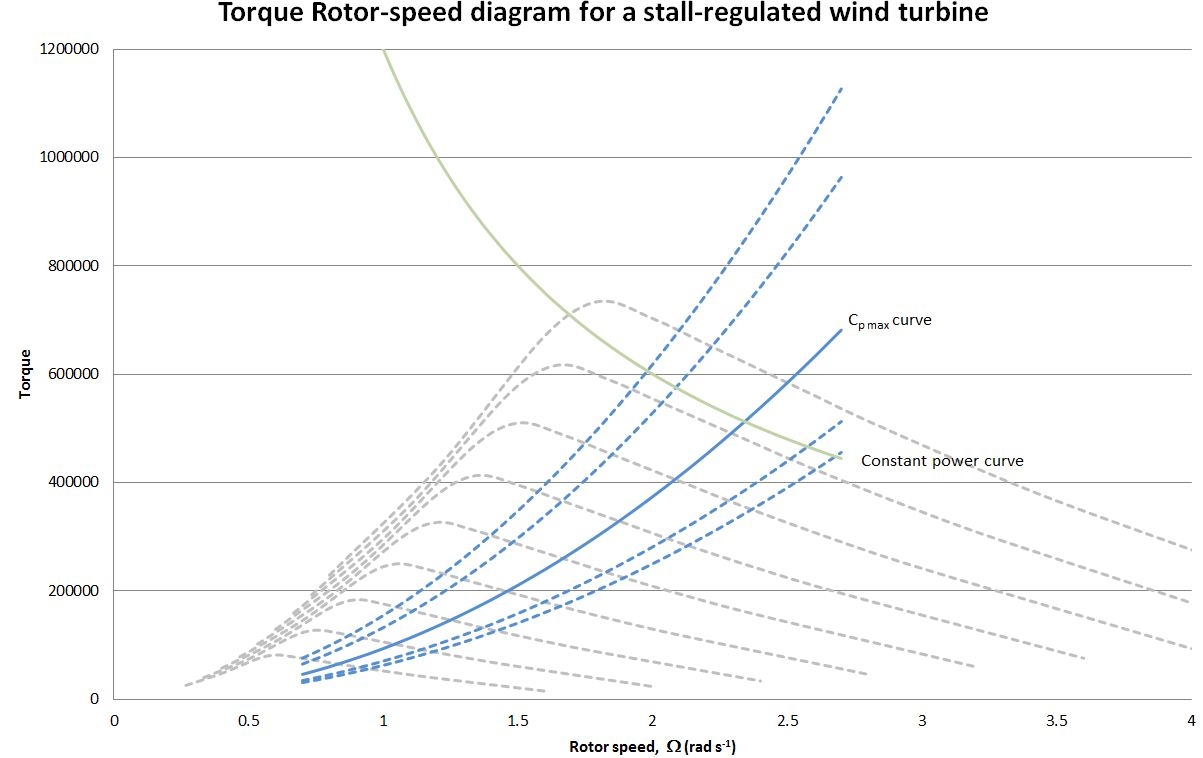

==== Notes ====
Green curve: Plot of power = rated power so that $P = Q\omega$

Grey curve: Wind speed is assumed constant so that $Q \propto \omega^2 C_p(\lambda)$

Blue curve: Constant $C_p(\lambda)$ so that $Q \propto \omega^2$

== Blade forces ==
For further details, see Blade Element Momentum Theory

Consider the following figure:

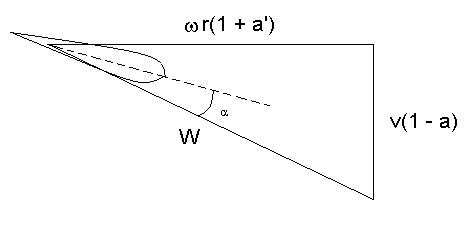

This is the depiction of the apparent wind speed, as seen by a blade (left of figure). The apparent wind speed is influenced by both the free-stream velocity of the air, and the rotor speed. From this figure, we can see that both the angle $\theta$ and the apparent wind speed $W$ are functions of the rotor speed, $\omega$. By extension, the lift and drag forces will also be functions of $\omega$. This means that the axial and tangential forces that act on the blade vary with rotor speed. The force in the axial direction is given by the following formula:

== Operating strategies for variable speed wind turbines ==
=== Stall regulated ===
As discussed earlier, a wind turbine would ideally operate at its maximum efficiency for below rated power. Once rated power has been hit, the power is limited. This is for two reasons: ratings on the drivetrain equipment, such as the generator; and second to reduce the loads on the blades. An operating strategy for a wind turbine can thus be divided into a sub-rated-power component, and a rated-power component.

==== Below rated power ====
Below rated power, the wind turbine will ideally operate in such a way that $C_p = C_{p~max}$. On a Torque-rotor speed diagram, this looks as follows:

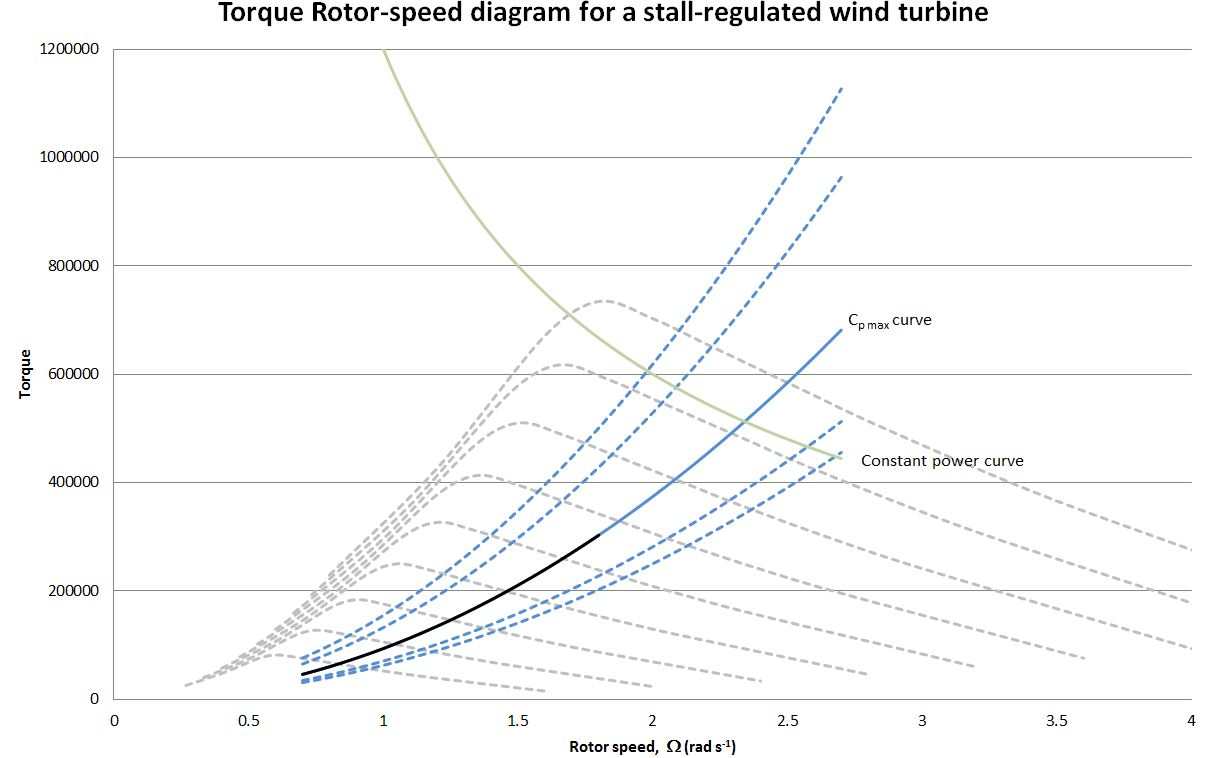

where the black line represents the initial section of the operating strategy for a variable speed stall-regulated wind turbine. Ideally, we would want to stay on the maximum efficiency curve until rated power is hit. However, as the rotor speed increases, the noise levels increase. To counter this, the rotor speed is not allowed to increase above a certain value. This is illustrated in the figure below:

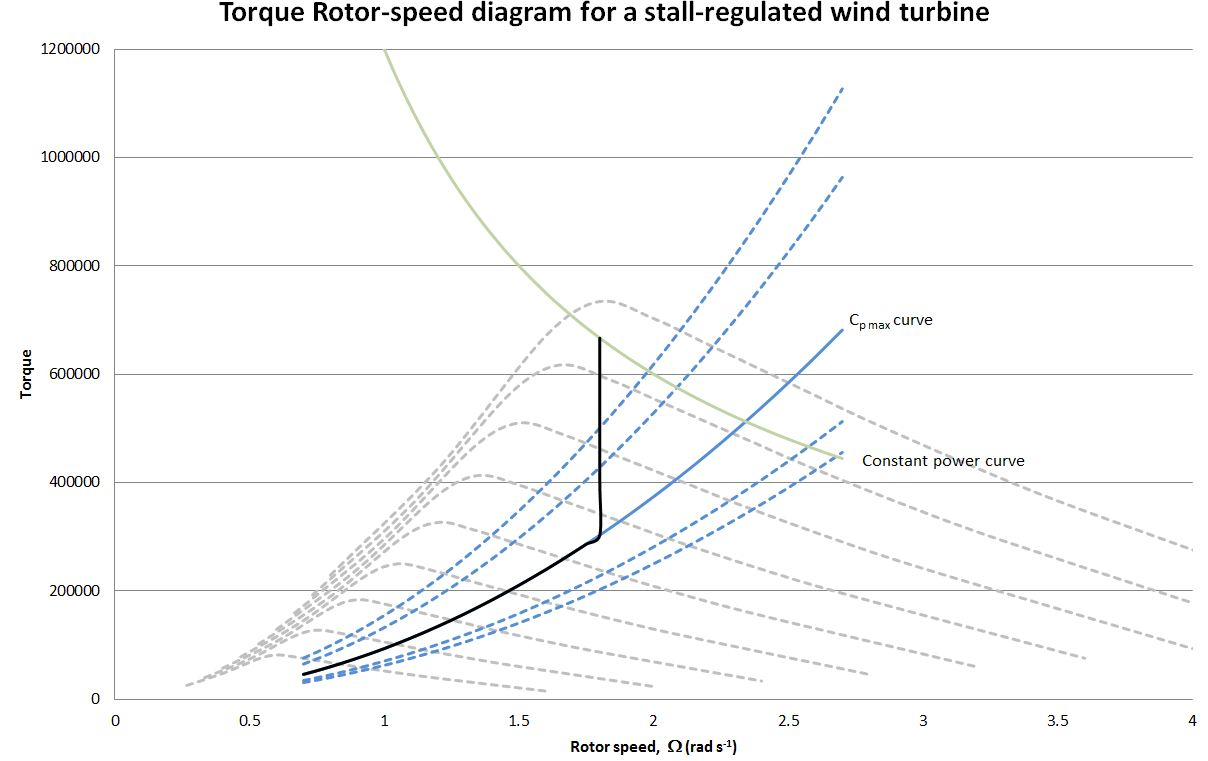

==== Rated power and above ====
Once the wind speed has reached a certain level, called rated wind speed, the turbine should not be able to produce any greater levels of power for higher wind speeds. A stall-regulated variable speed wind turbine has no pitching mechanism. However, the rotor speed is variable. The rotor speed can either be increased or decreased by an appropriately designed controller. In reference to the figure illustrated in the blade forces section, it is evident that the angle between the apparent wind speed and the plane of rotation is dependent upon the rotor speed. This angle is termed the angle of attack.

The lift and drag co-efficients for an airfoil are related to the angle of attack. Specifically, for high angles of attack, an airfoil stalls. That is, the drag substantially increases. The lift and drag forces influence the power production of a wind turbine. This can be seen from an analysis of the forces acting on a blade as air interacts with the blade (see the following link). Thus, forcing the airfoil to stall can result in power limiting.

So it can be established that if the angle of attack needs to be increased to limit the power production of the wind turbine, the rotor speed must be reduced. Again, this can be seen from the figure in the blade forces section. It can also be seen from considering the torque-rotor speed diagram. In reference to the above torque-rotor speed diagram, by reducing the rotor speed at high wind speeds, the turbine enters the stall region, thus bringing some limiting to the power output.

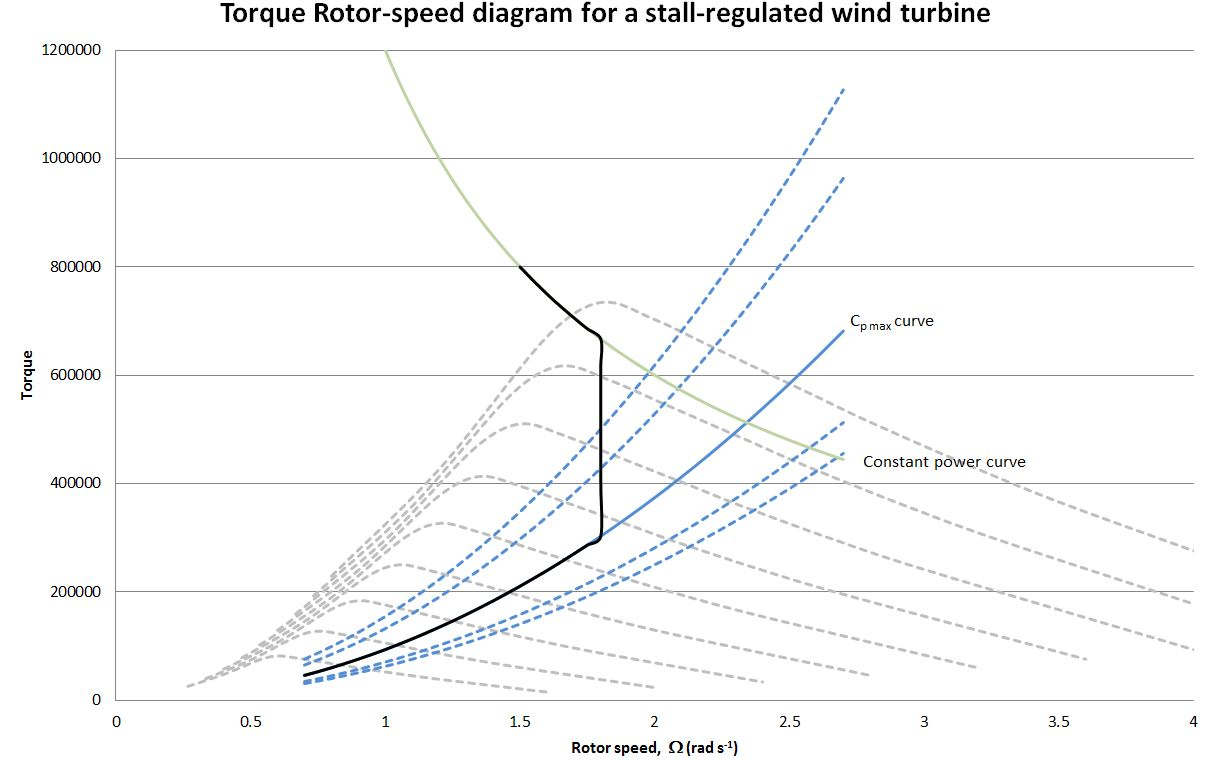

=== Pitch regulated ===
Pitch regulation thus allows the wind turbine to actively change the angle of attack of the air on the blades. This is preferred over a stall-regulated wind turbine as it enables far greater control of the power output.

==== Below rated power ====
Identical to the stall-regulated variable-speed wind turbine, the initial operating strategy is to operate on the $C_{p~max}$ curve. However, due to constraints such as noise levels, this is not possible for the full range of sub-rated wind speeds. Below the rated wind speed, the following operating strategy is employed:

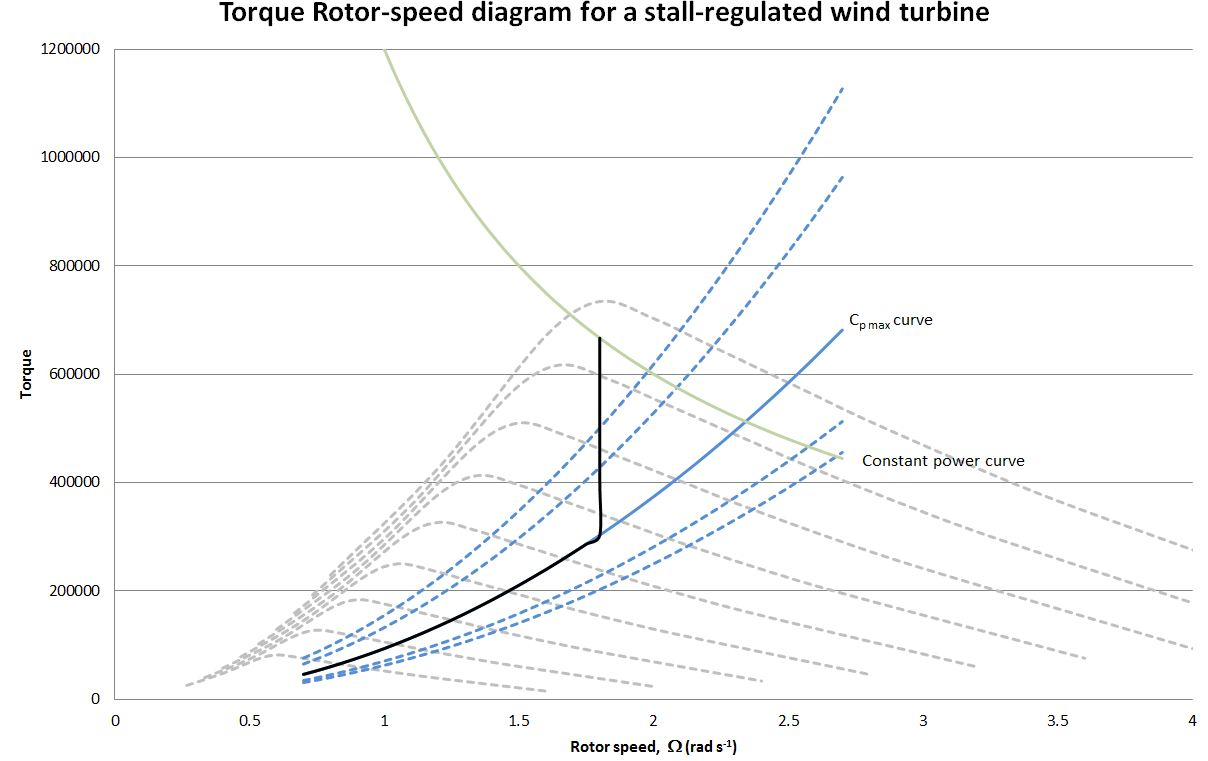

==== Above rated power ====
Above the rated wind speed, the pitching mechanism is employed. This allows a good level of control over the angle of attack, thus control over the torque. The previous torque rotor-speed diagrams are all plots when the pitch angle, $\beta$, is zero. A three dimensional plot can be produced which includes variations in pitch angle.

Ultimately, in the 2D plot, above rated wind speed, the turbine will operate at the point marked 'x' on the diagram below.

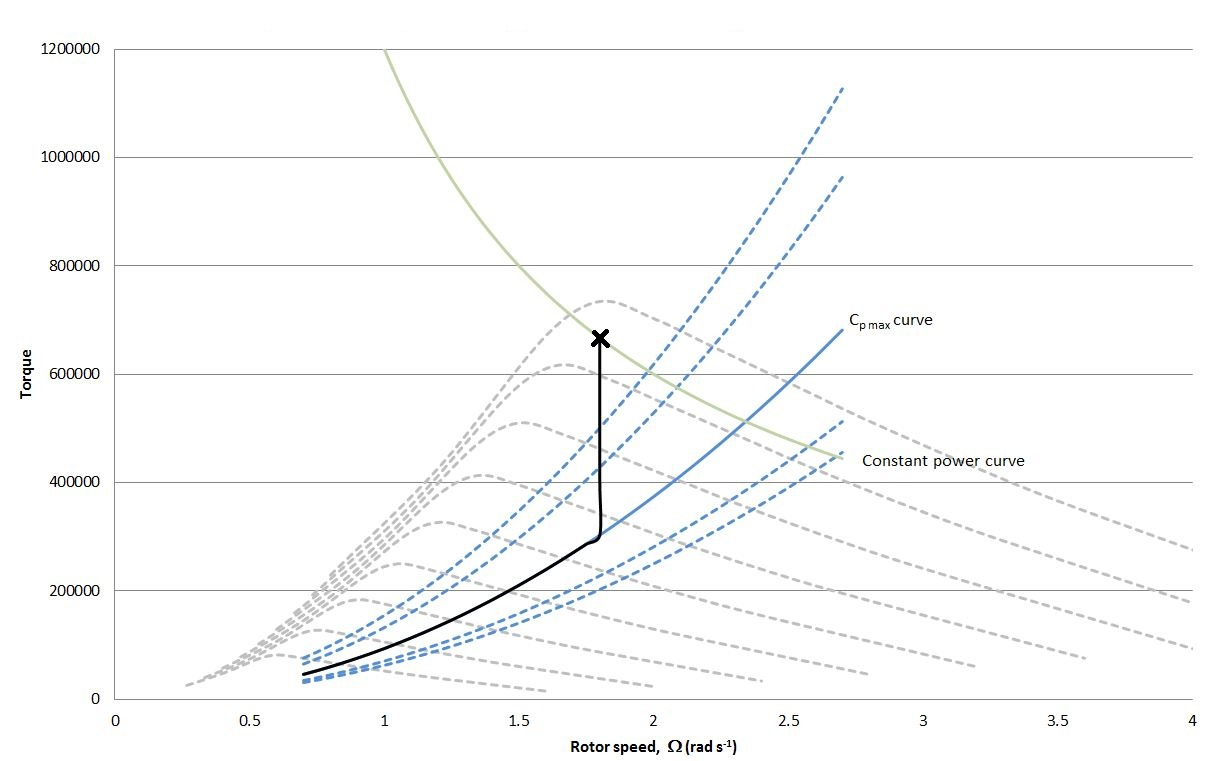

== Gearboxes ==
A variable speed may or may not have a gearbox, depending on the manufacturer's desires. Wind turbines without gearboxes are called direct-drive wind turbines. An advantage of a gearbox is that generators are typically designed to have the rotor rotating at a high speed within the stator. Direct drive wind turbines do not exhibit this feature. A disadvantage of a gearbox is reliability and failure rates.

An example of a wind turbine without a gearbox is the Enercon E82.

== Generators ==
For variable speed wind turbines, one of two types of generators can be used: a DFIG (doubly fed induction generator) or an FRC (fully rated converter).

A DFIG generator draws reactive power from the transmission system; this can increase the vulnerability of a transmission system in the event of a failure. A DFIG configuration will require the generator to be a wound rotor; squirrel cage rotors cannot be used for such a configuration.

A fully rated converter can either be an induction generator or a permanent magnet generator. Unlike the DFIG, the FRC can employ a squirrel cage rotor in the generator; an example of this is the Siemens SWT 3.6-107, which is termed the industry workhorse. An example of a permanent magnet generator is the Siemens SWT-2.3-113. A disadvantage of a permanent magnet generator is the cost of materials that need to be included.

=== Grid Connections ===
Consider a variable speed wind turbine with a permanent magnet synchronous generator. The generator produces AC electricity. The frequency of the AC voltage generated by the wind turbine is a function of the speed of the rotor within the generator:

$N = \frac{120f}{P}$

where $N$ is the rotor speed, $P$ is the number of poles in the generator, and $f$ is the frequency of the output Voltage. That is, as the wind speed varies, the rotor speed varies, and so the frequency of the Voltage varies. This form of electricity cannot be directly connected to a transmission system. Instead, it must be corrected such that its frequency is constant. For this, power converters are employed, which results in the de-coupling of the wind turbine from the transmission system. As more wind turbines are included in a national power system, the inertia is decreased. This means that the frequency of the transmission system is more strongly affected by the loss of a single generating unit.

==== Power converters ====
As already mentioned, the voltage generated by a variable speed wind turbine is non-grid compliant. In order to supply the transmission network with power from these turbines, the signal must be passed through a power converter, which ensures that the frequency of the voltage of the electricity being generated by the wind turbine is the frequency of the transmission system when it is transferred onto the transmission system. Power converters first convert the signal to DC, and then convert the DC signal to an AC signal. Techniques used include pulse width modulation.
