= Näsudden =

Swedish peninsula

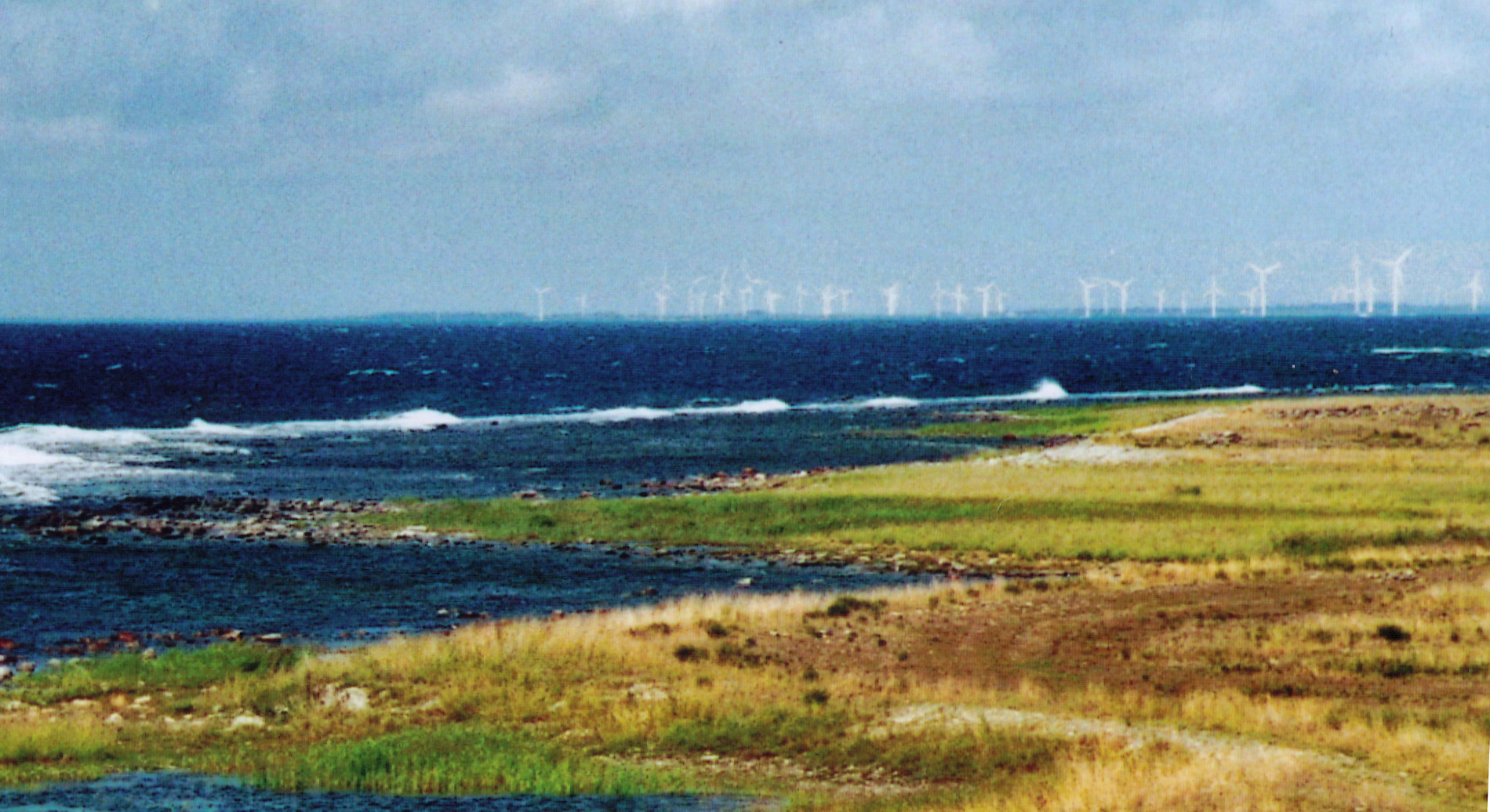
- Näsudden wind farm seen from Hoburgen

- Location within Gotland

Geography
- Location: Baltic Sea
- Coordinates: 57°04′15″N 18°13′45″E

Administration
- Sweden

Näsudden is a peninsula on the south coast of Gotland, Sweden. The first tests for using wind power on a large scale in Sweden, were conducted there in the 1970s. The area has since been developed into a wind farm. Part of the peninsula is a nature reserve for birds and grey seals.

== Geography ==
Näsudden is a peninsula on the south coast of Gotland, Sweden, adjacent the localities of Näs, Fide and Burgsvik. Näsudden had a weather station between 1986 and 1999. During this period, during a late summer heat wave of 1997 Näsudden broke the nationwide record for consecutive overnight lows above 20 °C (68 °F) and a yearly record for those nights. Between August 20 and September 3 the temperature never fell below 20.2 °C (68.4 °F), but also never rose above 25.3 °C (77.5 °F) during the day.

== Wind power ==
It was on Näsudden that wind power on a large scale was first tested in Sweden. The Swedish power company Vattenfall, started to explore and develop wind power in the 1970s, and southern Gotland was selected as a suitable location for tests in 1979. Construction of a prototype wind turbine, the Näsudden I, started in the beginning of the 1980s. The prototype was ready and started in 1983. The collecting of data from the trial runs and evaluation of the project was financed by the Swedish government. The study became the base for further research in wind power technology in Sweden. Näsudden I was in operation until 1989, when it was replaced by Näsudden II.

Näsudden was developed into a large wind farm during the 1990s. In 2010, it had the highest wind power density in Sweden. In 2014, there were 60 wind turbines on Näsudden, ten of which were owned by Vattenfall. In 2004, the then-largest land based wind turbine, the Olsvenne 2, was built on the peninsula. On 9 January 2007, the Näsudden II was decommissioned. During the time it was in operation it produced 61,4 GWh in 61,496 hours, a world record at that time.

On Näsudden, there is also a 120 m (390 ft) mast with instruments for measuring temperature, wind direction, wind speed and other meteorological data on different altitudes. The readings are continuously presented on line, where it is available to anyone. In 2009, there were a total of 156 wind turbines on Gotland, producing 200,158,000 kWh of electricity.

In 2014, the last of the first large wind turbines were torn down and dismantled. They will be replaced by a new generation of more efficient turbines. Prior to that, a new cable for transmitting the electricity to mainland Sweden must be in place, since the existing one is insufficient for the energy produced by the new turbines.

The Näsudden wind farm is open to the public and has an exhibition about wind power.

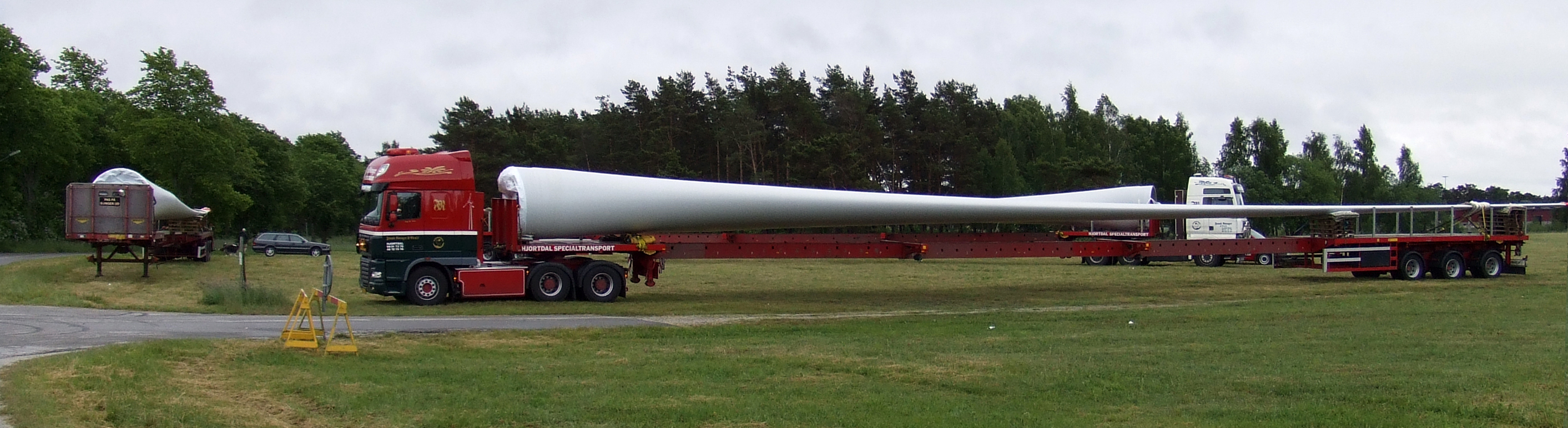
Turbine blades on trucks stopping south of Visby before continuing further south on Gotland.

== Nature reserve ==
On the southwestern tip of Näsudden is the 94 ha (230 acres) Näs Reef Seal and Bird Reserve (Näsrevets säl- och fågelskyddsområde). The area has a rich bird life, it is the second most visited habitat for greylag geese in the Baltic Sea during their annual "wing moult". It also has a small colony of grey seals.
