= Floating offshore wind =

Type of wind turbine

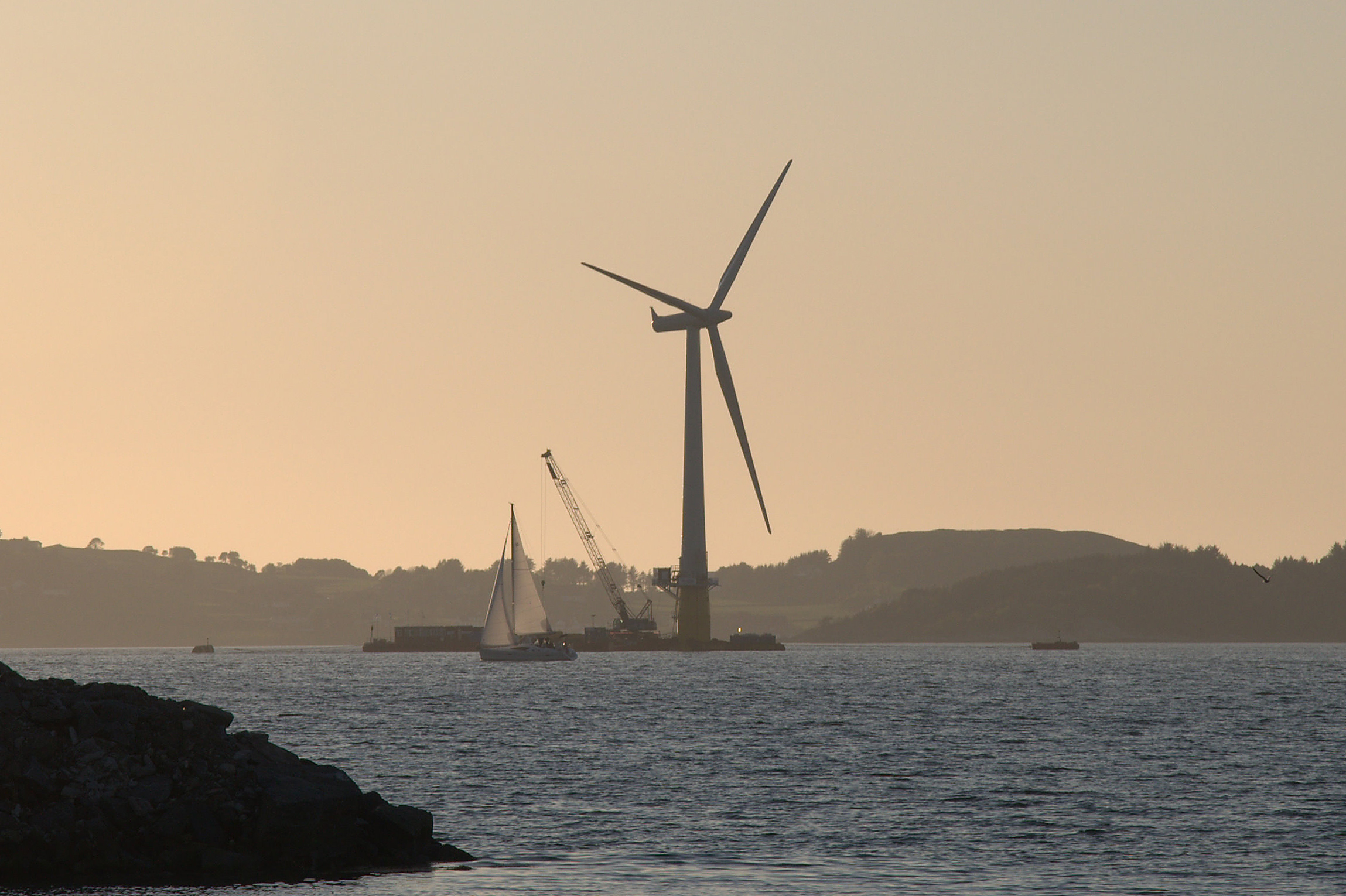
The world's first full-scale floating wind turbine, the 2.3 MW Hywind, being assembled in the Åmøy Fjord near Stavanger, Norway in 2009, before deployment in the North Sea

Floating offshore wind involves one or more offshore wind turbines mounted on a floating structure that allows the turbine to generate electricity in water depths where fixed-foundation turbines are not technically/economically feasible. Floating wind farms have the potential to significantly increase the sea area available for offshore wind farms, especially in countries with limited shallow waters, such as Spain, Portugal, Japan, France and the United States' West Coast, and countries with few remaining viable shallow-water sites (like the United Kingdom). Locating wind farms further offshore can also reduce visual pollution, provide better accommodation for fishing and shipping lanes, and reach stronger and more consistent winds.

Commercial floating wind turbines are mostly at the early phase of development, with several single turbine prototypes having been installed since 2007, and the first farms since 2017. As of October 2024, there are 245 MW of operational floating wind turbines, with a future pipeline of 266 GW around the world.

The Hywind Tampen floating offshore wind farm, recognized as the world's largest, began operating in August 2023. Located approximately 140 kilometers off the coast of Norway, it consists of 11 turbines and is expected to supply about 35% of the electricity needs for five nearby oil and gas platforms. When it was consented in April 2024, the proposed Green Volt offshore wind farm off the north-east coast of Scotland was the world's largest consented floating offshore wind farm at 560 MW from 35 turbines each rated at 16 MW. If built, it will mostly supply electricity to decarbonise offshore oil production, but will also provide power to the UK national grid. However the nearest oil platform has refused to be connected and doubts have been expressed about relying on renewable energy on oil platforms, potentially causing problems with the viability of the project.

There is a very wide variety of technology concepts for floating offshore wind farms, which typically involve steel or concrete substructures (effectively a hull) connected to the seabed (moored) using steel chains or synthetic ropes. A 2026 study of available concepts counted over 100 such concepts.

== History ==
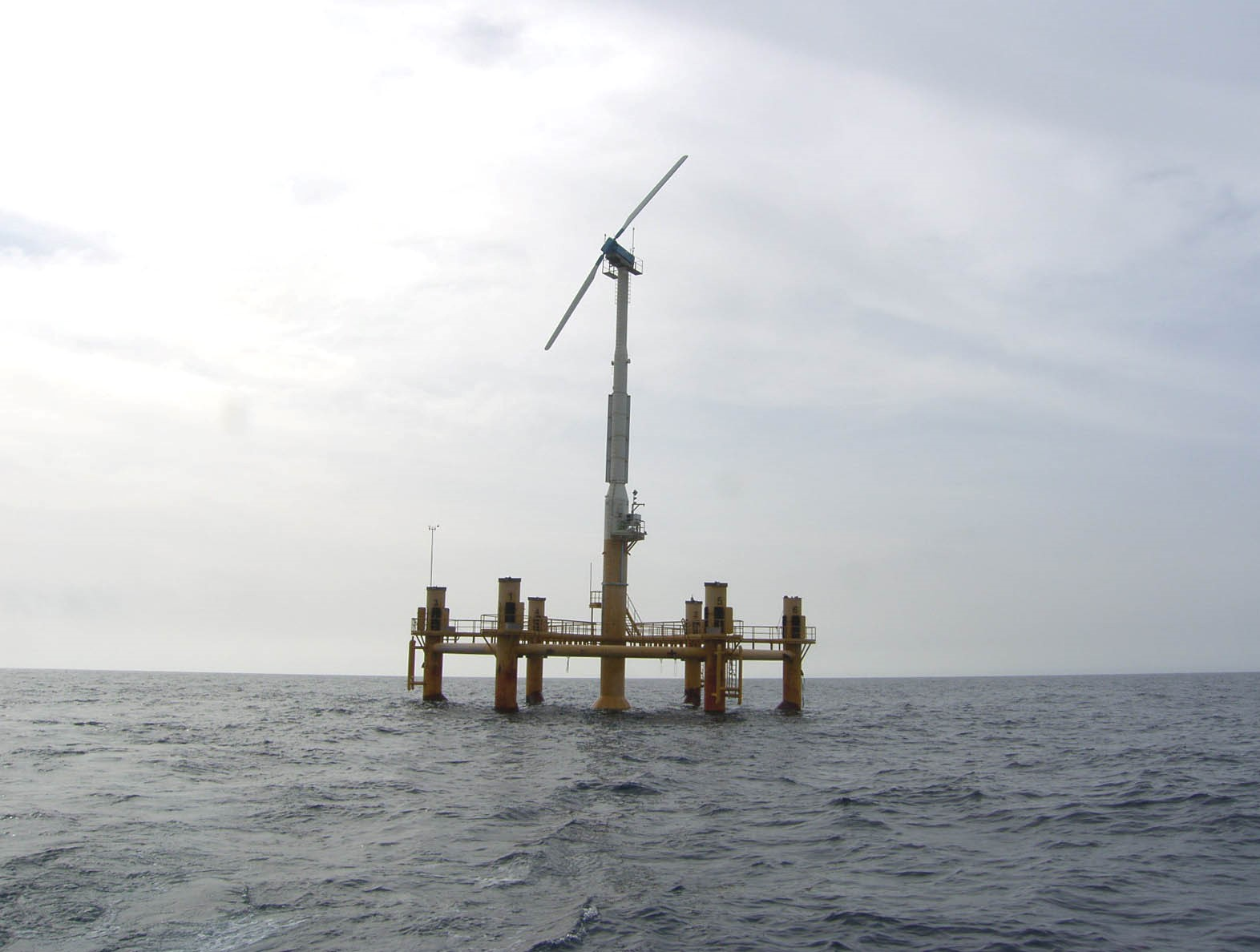
Blue H Technologies - World's first floating wind turbine (80 kW), installed in waters 113 metres (371 ft) deep in 2007, 21.3 kilometres (13.2 mi) off the coast of Apulia, Italy

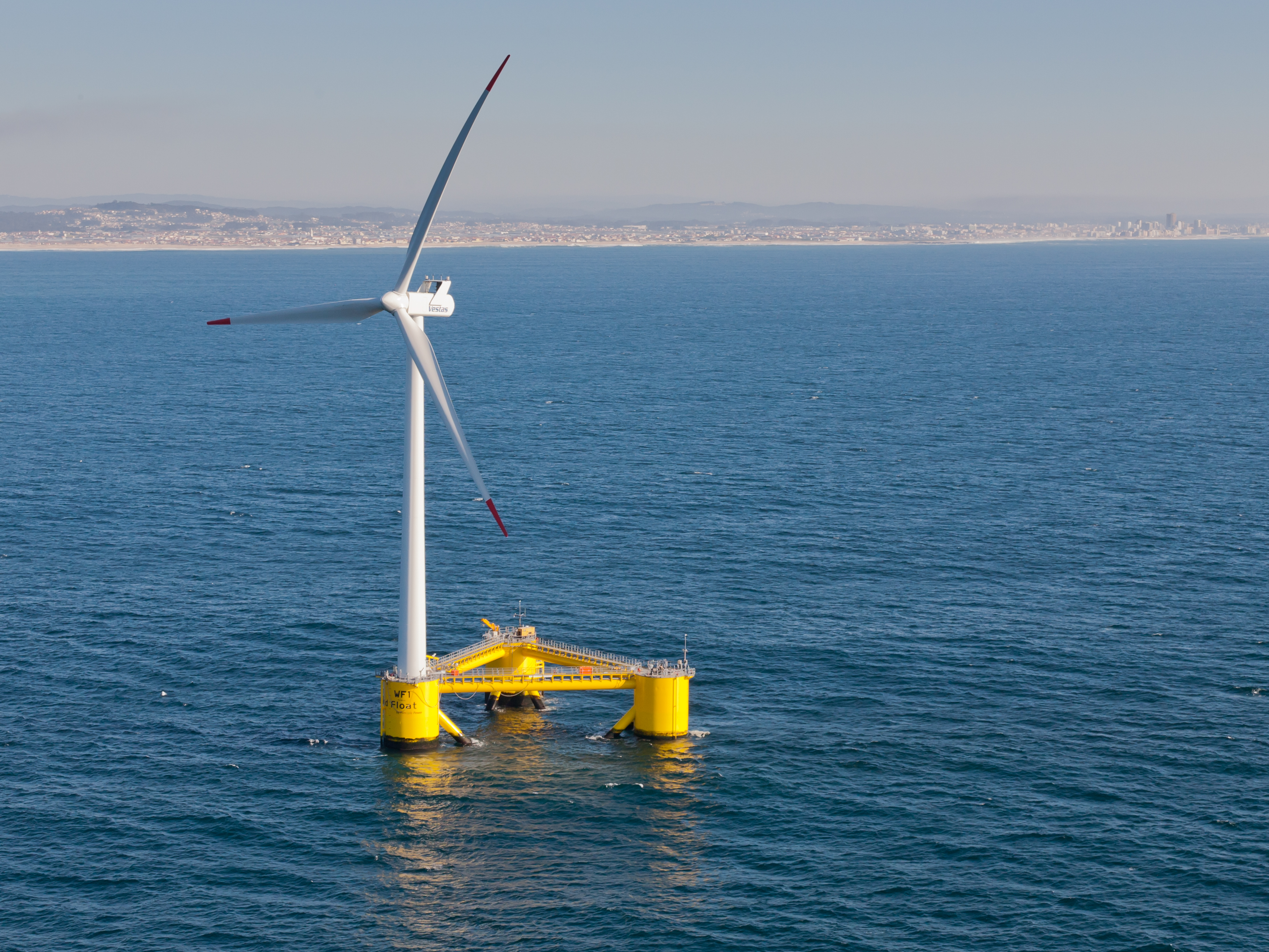
The world's second full-scale floating wind turbine (and first to be installed without the use of heavy-lift vessels), the 2 MW WindFloat, about 5 km offshore of Aguçadoura, Portugal

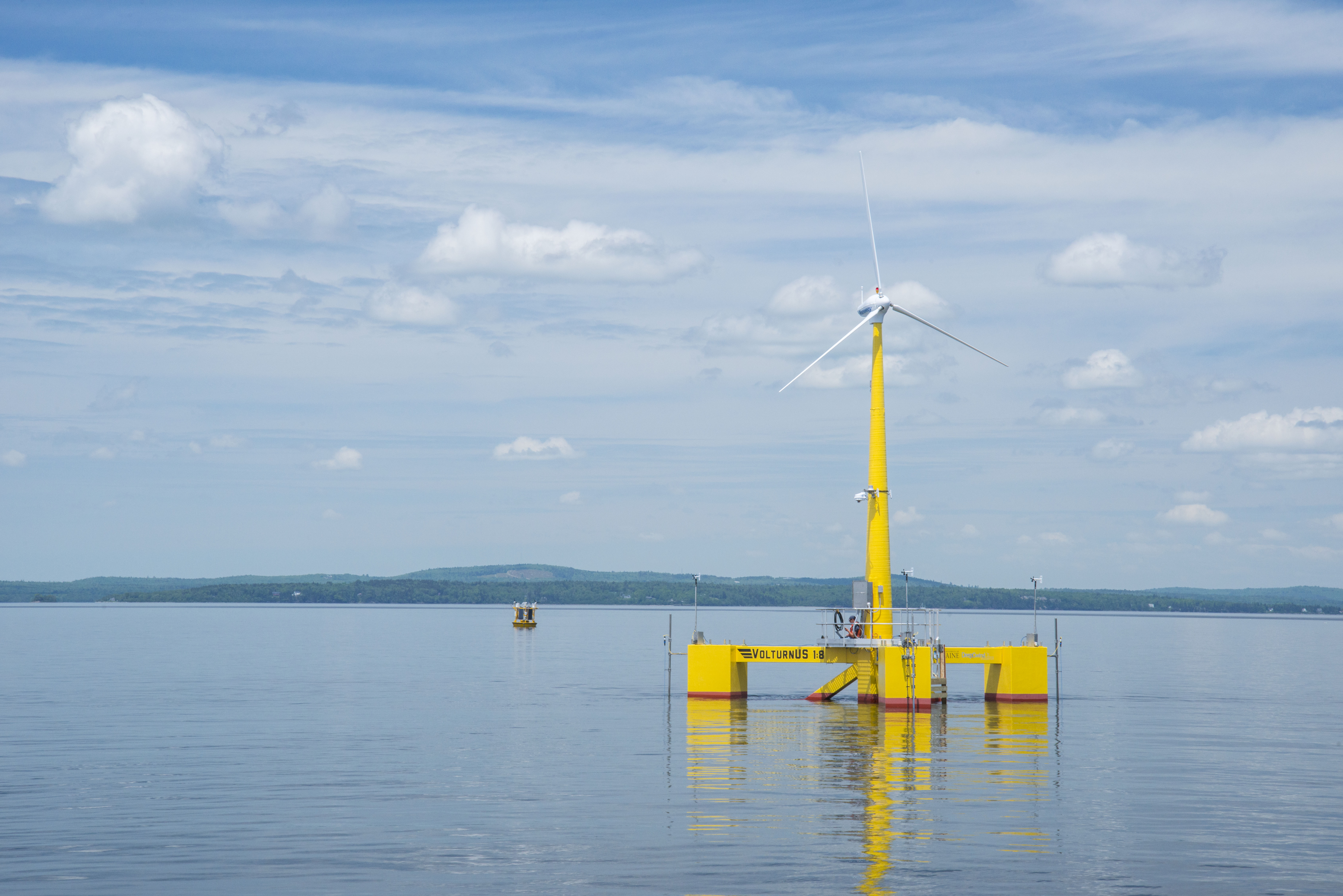
University of Maine's 20 kW VolturnUS 1:8 was the first grid-connected offshore wind turbine in the Americas, in 2013.

The concept for large-scale offshore floating wind turbines was introduced by William E. Heronemus at the University of Massachusetts Amherst in 1972. It was not until the mid 1990s, after the commercial wind industry was well established, that the topic was taken up again by the mainstream research community. A summary of projects and developments is given below.

=== Individual turbines ===
In December 2007, Blue H Technologies of the Netherlands deployed the world's first floating wind turbine, 21.3 kilometres (13.2 mi) off the coast of Apulia, Italy. The 80 kW prototype was installed in waters 113 metres (371 ft) deep in order to gather test data on wind and sea conditions, and was decommissioned at the end of 2008. The turbine utilized a tension-leg platform design and a two-bladed turbine.

A single floating cylindrical spar buoy moored by catenary cables. Hywind uses a ballasted catenary layout that adds 60 tonne weights hanging from the midpoint of each anchor cable to provide additional tension.

In December 2009, the first large-capacity, 2.3 MW floating wind turbine named Hywind became operation in the North Sea near Norway. The turbine was constructed by Siemens Wind Power and mounted on a floating tower with a 100 m deep draft, with a float tower constructed by Technip. After assembly in the calmer waters of Åmøy Fjord near Stavanger, Norway, the 120 m tall tower was towed 10 km offshore into 220 m deep water, 10 km southwest of Karmøy, on 6 June 2009 for a two-year test deployment. Hywind, owned by Statoil, cost 400 million kroner (around US$62 million) to build and deploy. The 13-kilometre (8.1 mi) long submarine power transmission cable was installed in July 2009 and system test including rotor blades and initial power transmission was conducted shortly thereafter. The installation was expected to generate about 9 gigawatt-hour of electricity annually. In 2010 it survived 11 meter waves with seemingly no wear. By 2016, the turbine had produced 50 GWh; an overall capacity factor of 41%. The turbine survived 40 m/s wind speed and 19 m waves and was sold in 2019, expecting 10 more years of production and tests. At the same site, the 3.6 MW TetraSpar was commissioned in December 2021.

In September 2011, Principle Power, backed by EDP, Repsol, ASM and Portugal ventures installed in Portugal the second grid-connected full-scale prototype. WindFloat WF1 was fitted with a Vestas 2 MW turbine and went on to produce over 17 GWh of electricity over the next 5 years. The unit was decommissioned in 2016 and was later repurposed.

In June 2013, the University of Maine deployed the 20 kW VolturnUS 1:8, a 65 foot (20 m) tall floating turbine prototype that is 1:8th the scale of a 6-MW, 450 foot (140 m) rotor diameter design. VolturnUS 1:8 was the first grid-connected offshore wind turbine deployed in the Americas. The VolturnUS design utilizes a concrete semi-submersible floating hull and a composite materials tower designed to reduce both capital and Operation & Maintenance costs, and to allow local manufacturing. The technology was the result of collaborative research and development conducted by the University of Maine-led DeepCwind Consortium.

The first 2 MW Hitachi turbine became operational in November 2013, and had a 32% capacity factor and a floating transformer (see also List of offshore wind farms in Japan). Two larger turbines of 5 and 7 MW have been unsuccessful. The first floating turbine in Japan was floated near Fukue Island in 2016, after a 5-year demonstration period near shore.

In late 2021, China started its first floating wind turbine, a 5.5 MW MingYang at the 400 MW fixed-bottom Yangxi Shapa III wind farm.

PivotBuoy received €4m EU funding in 2019, and installed a 225 kW Vestas downwind turbine in 50-metre water depth at the Oceanic Platform of the Canary Islands in 2022.

In 2023, the first floating wind platform in Spain became operational after being connected to the grid. The 2 MW DemoSATH project is a joint effort by Saitec Offshore Technologies, RWE, and the Kansai Electric Power Company.

=== Turbine arrays ===
Commissioned in October 2017, Hywind Scotland was the world's first commercial wind farm to use floating wind turbines. The farm has five 6 MW Siemens direct-drive turbines mounted on spar platforms, with a total capacity of 30 MW. Since this, several other wind farms have been installed including WindFloat Atlantic in 2020, Kincardine in 2021, and Hywind Tampen in 2023.

== Mooring systems ==
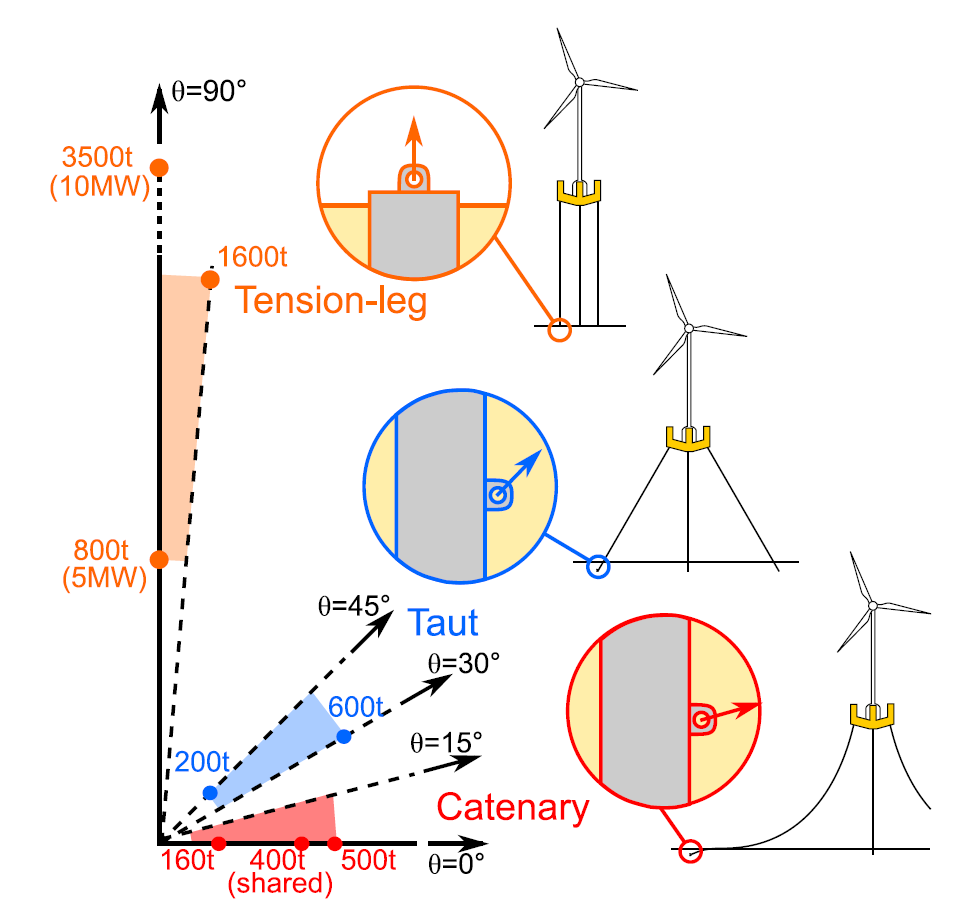
Catenary, taut, and tension-leg mooring systems along with typical anchor loads and inclination.

The mooring system provides the station keeping capability and ensures stability of the substructure and turbine. There are three mooring systems for floating offshore wind: catenary, taut, and tension-leg. These differ in the magnitude and inclination of the load transferred to the anchor.

As of 2023, the most common type is the catenary, which uses free hanging chain mooring lines, with the station-keeping force provided by the self-weight of the chain. A catenary mooring touches down on the seabed in advance of the seabed, meaning the anchor is loaded almost horizontally. The radius from the turbine to the anchor is approximately six to eight times the water depth. A catenary mooring system is used for the Hywind Tampen 88 MW floating offshore wind farm off the coast of Norway. Notably, this project also utilizes a novel concept of shared anchoring, where multiple mooring lines from adjacent turbines are connected to a single anchor, reducing the total number of anchors.

Taut mooring systems use synthetic rope to provide restoring force through the stiffness of the line, typically at an inclination to the seabed of 30 – 45 degrees.

Tension leg platforms use pre-tensioned vertical tethers to secure the turbine in place, providing large restoring moments in pitch and roll.

The IEC 61400–3 design standard requires that a loads analysis be based on site-specific external conditions such as wind, wave and currents. The IEC 61400–3-2 standard applies specifically to floating wind turbines.

== Economics ==
=== Introduction ===
The technical feasibility of deepwater floating wind turbines is not questioned, as the long-term survivability of floating structures has been successfully demonstrated by the marine and offshore oil industries over many decades. However, the economics that allowed the deployment of thousands of offshore oil rigs have yet to be demonstrated for floating wind turbine platforms. For deepwater wind turbines, a floating structure will replace pile-driven monopoles or conventional concrete bases that are commonly used as foundations for shallow water and land-based turbines. The floating structure must provide enough buoyancy to support the weight of the turbine and to restrain pitch, roll and heave motions within acceptable limits. The capital costs for the wind turbine itself will not be significantly higher than current marine-proofed turbine costs in shallow water. Therefore, the economics of deepwater wind turbines will be determined primarily by the additional costs of the floating structure and electric power distribution system, which are offset by higher offshore winds and close proximity to large load centres (e.g. shorter transmission runs).

With empirical data obtained from fixed-bottom installations off many countries since the late 1990s, representative costs and the economic feasibility of shallow-water offshore wind power are well understood. In 2009, shallow-water turbines cost US$2.4-3 million per megawatt to install, according to the World Energy Council, while the practical feasibility and per-unit economics of deep-water, floating-turbine offshore wind was yet to be established. In 2021, a French auction closed below €120/MWh (US$141/MWh) of electricity for a 250 MW project, and the high cost, small project size and lack of experience keep project developers and financial institutions from the risk of committing to the technology. In 2024, the 250 MW Pennavel project won an auction at €86/MWh.

=== Cost data from operational windfarms ===
Initial deployment of single full-capacity turbines in deep-water locations began only in 2009. The world's first commercial floating offshore windfarm, Hywind Scotland was commissioned in 2017. Its capital cost was £264 million, or £8.8m/MW, which is approximately three times the capital cost of fixed offshore windfarms and ten times the capital cost of gas-fired power stations. Its operating costs, at approximately £150,000/MW were also higher than for fixed offshore windfarms. A second UK project, the Kincardine Floating Offshore Windfarm, has been reported as costing £500 million to build, or £10m/MW. In 2023, costs for the 88 MW Hywind Tampen was calculated at NOK 8 billion.

=== Cost reduction strategies ===
As of October 2010, feasibility studies supported that floating turbines are becoming both technically and economically viable in the UK and global energy markets. "The higher up-front costs associated with developing floating wind turbines would be offset by the fact that they would be able to access areas of deep water off the coastline of the UK where winds are stronger and reliable." The Offshore Valuation study conducted in the UK has confirmed that using just one third of the UK's wind, wave and tidal resource could generate energy equivalent to 1 billion barrels of oil per year; the same as North Sea oil and gas production. A significant challenge when using this approach is the coordination needed to develop transmission lines.

A 2015 report by Carbon Trust recommends 11 ways to reduce cost. Also in 2015, researchers at University of Stuttgart estimated cost at €230/MWh.

In California, offshore wind coincides well with evening and winter consumption, when grid demand is high and solar power is low. One of the few ports large enough to prepare offshore wind equipment could be Humboldt Bay.

UK floating offshore wind could reach “subsidy-free” levels by the early 2030s, according to a study completed by the Offshore Renewable Energy (ORE) Catapult's Floating Offshore Wind Centre of Excellence (FOW CoE).

The UK leading technology innovation and research centre for offshore energy ORE Catapult has produced a report on the Tugdock technology: “Tugdock which could enable floating wind developments at sites without suitable port facilities nearby. It could also reduce substructure assembly costs by 10% when compared with conventional methods by reducing requirements for costly heavy lift vessels that are few and far between”.

== Floating windfarm projects ==
Offshore windfarms, including floating windfarms, provide a small but growing fraction of total windfarm power generation. Such power generation capacity must grow substantially to help meet the IEA's Net Zero by 2050 pathway.

=== Operational ===
The world's first commercial floating offshore windfarm, Hywind Scotland, was commissioned in 2017. It uses 5 Siemens turbines of 6 MW each, has a capacity of 30 MW and is sited 18 miles (29 km) off Peterhead. The project also incorporates a 1 MWh lithium-ion battery system (called Batwind). In its first 5 years of operation it averaged a capacity factor of 54%, sometimes in 10 meter waves.

WindFloat Atlantic, sited 20 km off the coast of Viana do Castelo, Portugal, has a capacity of 25 MW and has operated since July 2020. It produced 78 GWh in 2022, with a technical availability of 93%.

The 48 MW Kincardine Offshore Wind Farm is the UK's second commercial floating offshore windfarm, and completed construction in August 2021, and became fully operational in October 2021. It is located 15 kilometres off the coast of Aberdeenshire, Scotland, in water depths ranging from 60 metres to 80 metres. Two of the turbines have been towed to port for repairs, and returned.

In August 2019, Enova awarded NOK2.3 billion to Equinor for the NOK 8 billion 88 MW concrete floating wind farm called Hywind Tampen, with the purpose of reducing technology costs and supplying 35% of the annual power to the Snorre and Gullfaks oil fields. Construction began in 2021, and turbines were assembled in 2022, sending first power to Gullfaks A in November 2022, and completed in August 2023.

Wind farm	Location	Type	Technology	Capacity (MW)	Turbines	Commissioning	Build Cost	Cap. fac.	Depth range (m)	km to shore	Owner	Notes
Hywind Scotland	57°28′59″N 1°21′00″W	Spar	Hywind Spar by Equinor	30	5 x Siemens SG 6MW	2017	£8.8m/MW	54%		25	Equinor (75%); Masdar (25%)	
WindFloat Atlantic	41°41′11″N 9°03′24″W	Semi-Submersible	WindFloat® by Principle Power	25	3 x Vestas 8.4MW	2020		34%	100	20	Ocean Winds, Principle Power, Repsol	Portugal
Kincardine Offshore Wind Farm	57°00′17″N 1°51′35″W	Semi- Submersible	WindFloat® by Principle Power	50	5 x Vestas 9.5MW + 2 MW	2021 October			60—80	15	Cobra	Scotland. WindFloat.
Hywind Tampen	61°20′02″N 2°15′34″E	Spar	Hywind Spar by Equinor	88	11 x Siemens Gamesa 8.6 MW	2022 November — 2023 August	NOK 8 billion ($730 million; $8.3m/MW)		260—300	140	Equinor etc.	Norway Snorre&Gullfaks oil fields
Provence Grand Large	43.1665°N 4.9709°W	Tension Leg Platform (TLP)	SBM Offshore and IFP Energies Nouvelles	25	8 x Siemens Gamesa 8 MW (8.0-167)	2024			99	18.5	EDF Renewables, Enbridge	

Location map

=== Proposals ===
In 2011, Japan planned to build a pilot floating wind farm, with six 2-megawatt turbines, off the Fukushima coast of northeast Japan where the Fukushima Daiichi nuclear disaster created a scarcity of electric power. After the evaluation phase is complete in 2016, "Japan plans to build as many as 80 floating wind turbines off Fukushima by 2020." The cost is expected to be in the range of 10–20 billion Yen over five years to build the first six floating wind turbines. In 2011, some foreign companies had also planned to bid on the 1-GW large floating wind farm that Japan hoped to build by 2020. In March 2012, Japan's Ministry of Economy, Trade and Industry approved a 12.5bn yen ($154m) project to float a 2-MW Fuji in March 2013 and two 7-MW Mitsubishi hydraulic "SeaAngel" later about 20–40 km offshore in 100–150 metres of water depth. The Japanese Wind Power Association claims a potential of 519 GW of floating offshore wind capacity in Japan. The four-post principle from Fukushima was certified for feasibility in 2020, and consortium was formed to mass produce the floating foundations. In 2018, NEDO announced two tenders to be launched aiming to support the development of both floating and fixed-bottom offshore wind projects in the country.

The US State of Maine solicited proposals in September 2010 to build a floating wind farm. The Request For Proposal was seeking proposals for 25 MW of deep-water offshore wind capacity to supply power for 20-year long-term contract period in the Gulf of Maine. Proposals were due by May 2011. In April 2012 Statoil received state regulatory approval to build a large four-unit demonstration wind farm off the coast of Maine. As of April 2013, the Hywind 2 4-tower, 12–15 MW wind farm was being developed by Statoil North America for placement 20 kilometres (12 mi) off the east coast of Maine in 140–158 metres (459–518 ft)-deep water of the Atlantic Ocean. Like the first Hywind installation off Norway, the turbine foundation would be a spar floater. The State of Maine Public Utility Commission voted to approve the construction and fund the US$120 million project by adding approximately 75 cents/month to the average retail electricity consumer. Power could be flowing into the grid no earlier than 2016. As a result of legislation in 2013 by the State of Maine, Statoil placed the planned Hywind Maine floating wind turbine development project on hold in July 2013. The legislation required the Maine Public Utilities Commission to undertake a second round of bidding for the offshore wind sites with a different set of ground rules, which subsequently led Statoil to suspend due to increased uncertainty and risk in the project. Statoil considered other locations for its initial US demonstration project. Some vendors who could bid on the proposed project in Maine expressed concerns in 2010 about dealing with the United States regulatory environment. Since the proposed site is in federal waters, developers would need a permit from the US Minerals Management Service, "which took more than seven years to approve a yet-to-be-built, shallow-water wind project off Cape Cod" (Cape Wind). "Uncertainty over regulatory hurdles in the United States … is 'the Achilles heel' for Maine's ambitions for deepwater wind." In 2013, Statoil pulled out of the $120 million project of four 3-MW turbines floating in 140 m depth of water near Boothbay Harbor, Maine citing change in legislation, and focused on their five 6-MW turbines in Scotland instead, where the average wind speed is 10 m/s and the water depth is 100 m.

In June 2016, Maine's New England Aqua Ventus I floating offshore wind demonstration project, designed by the DeepCwind Consortium, was selected by the U.S. Department of Energy to participate in the Offshore Wind Advanced Technology Demonstration program. In August 2021, the project got approval to use non-US barges.

In January 2022, Crown Estate Scotland, the public corporation of the Scottish Government responsible for the management of land and property in Scotland, awarded 14.5 GW in 10 leases for floating wind farms, along with 10 GW of fixed-foundation. There were 74 applicants, and 17 winners. By April 2022, all 17 lease holders had signed up, and are required to pay £700m to the Scottish government. Floating wind power has so far been considered costly, but industry commentators described the program, ScotWind, as a commercial breakthrough.

In December 2022, the US Bureau of Ocean Energy Management awarded leases for 4.6 GW on 373,000 acres offshore California to 5 winners who are required to pay $750m. The price of $2,000/acre is less than East Coast leases, due to lower competition and higher build cost.

As of 2023, Europe hosts four small floating wind farms with a combined capacity of 176 MW. Expansion plans are notable, with France tendering a 250 MW project off Brittany and two more in the Mediterranean. Large-scale auctions are expected in Spain, Portugal, Norway, and the UK, which has already allocated rights for over 15 GW. Europe aims for 3–4 GW of floating wind capacity by 2030, potentially reaching 10 GW with supportive policies.

== Research ==
Scale modeling and computer modeling attempt to predict the behavior of large–scale wind turbines in order to avoid costly failures and to expand the use of offshore wind power from fixed to floating foundations. Topics for research in this field include:

=== Computer models ===
- Overview of integrated dynamic calculations for floating offshore wind turbines
- Fully coupled aerohydro-servo-elastic response; a basic research tool to validate new designs

=== Scale models ===
- Water tank studies on 1:100 scale tension-leg platform and Spar Buoy platforms
- Dynamic response dependency on the mooring configuration

=== Improved designs ===
- Gearbox changes, including to hydraulic systems, may reduce capital and maintenance costs
- Alternative floating platform design, including for lowering the center of gravity, improving stability of mooring, and semisubmersible designs.

== Other applications ==
As they are suitable for towing, floating wind turbine units can be relocated to any location on the sea without much additional cost. So they can be used as prototype test units to practically assess the design adequacy and wind power potential of prospective sites.

When the transmission of generated wind power to nearby land is not economical, the power can be used in power to gas applications to produce hydrogen gas, ammonia / urea, reverse osmosis water desalination, natural gas, LPG, alkylate / gasoline, ship-mounted battery storage, etc. on floating platforms which can be easily transported to nearby consuming centers.

Floating wind turbines can be used to provide motive power for achieving artificial upwelling of nutrient-rich deep ocean water to the surface for enhancing fisheries growth in areas with tropical and temperate weather. Though deep seawater (below 50 meters depth) is rich in nutrients such as nitrogen and phosphorus, the phytoplankton growth is poor due to the absence of sunlight. The most productive ocean fishing grounds are located in cold water seas at high latitudes where natural upwelling of deep sea water occurs due to inverse thermocline temperatures. The electricity generated by the floating wind turbine would be used to drive high–flow and low–head water pumps to draw cold water from below 50 meters water depth and mixed with warm surface water by eductors before releasing it into the sea. Mediterranean Sea, Black Sea, Caspian Sea, Red Sea, Persian Gulf, deep water lakes/reservoirs are suitable for artificial upwelling for enhancing fish catch economically. These units can also be mobile-type to utilize the seasonal favourable winds all around the year.

== Prototypes and tests ==
=== Eolink ===
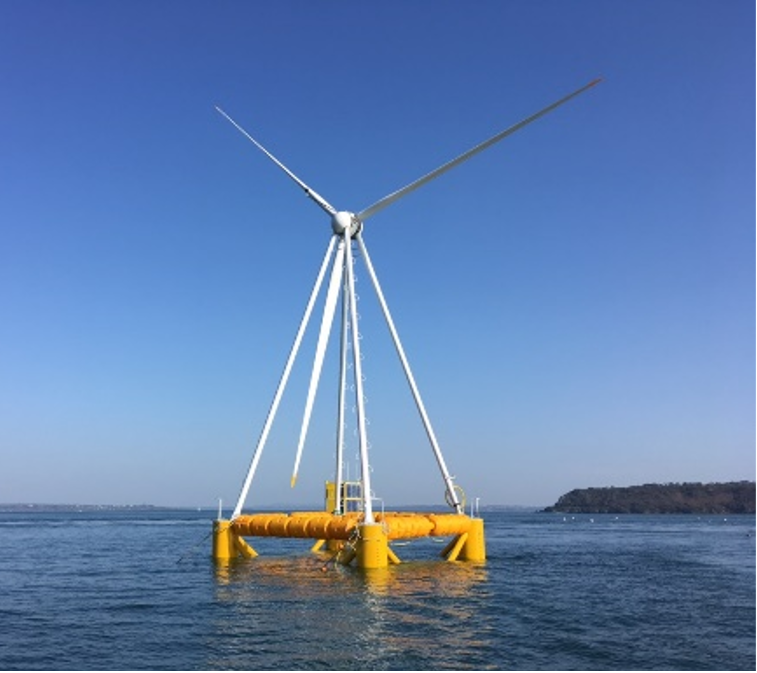
Floating Wind Turbine Single Point Mooring Eolink

Eolink floating wind turbine is a single point mooring system technology. The patented structure of this French company based in Plouzané is a semi-submersible floating hull with a 4 masts pyramidal structure. The structure supports the turbine by 2 upwind and 2 downwind masts. It gives more clearance for the blades and distributes stress. Unlike most of the floating wind turbines, the turbine rotates around its single mooring point to face the wind. The pivot point ensures the mechanical and electrical link between the turbine and the sea floor. Eolink grid connected its first one-tenth scale demonstrator in April 2018.

=== Ideol ===
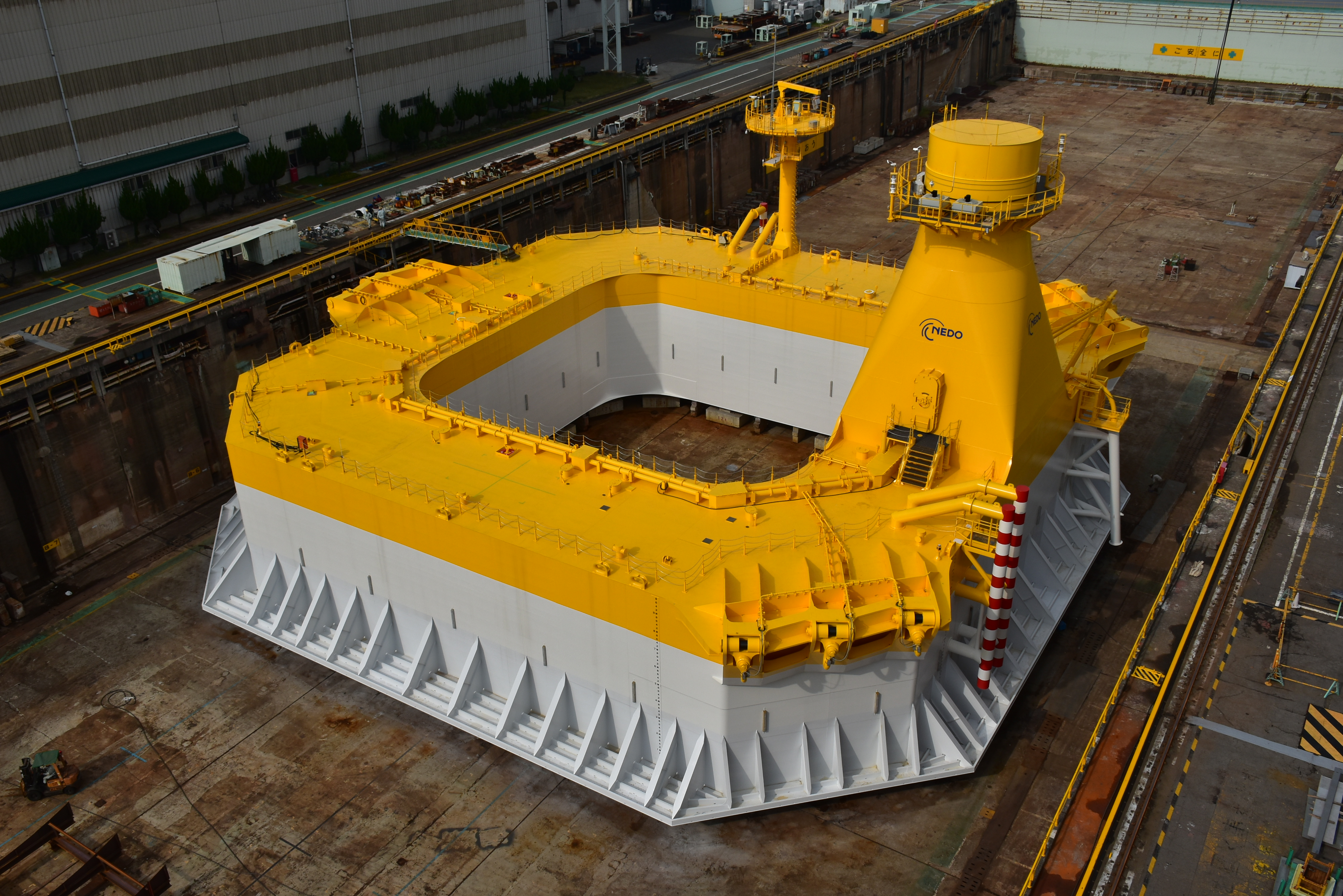
Steel floating substructure designed by Ideol for 3.2 MW NEDO project (Japan) based on Ideol technology, fully coated in dry dock before wind turbine installation

Ideol's engineers have developed and patented a ring-shaped floating foundation based on a central opening system (Damping Pool) used for optimizing foundation + wind turbine stability. As such, the sloshing water contained in this central opening counteracts the swell-induced floater oscillations. Foundation-fastened mooring lines are attached to the seabed to hold the assembly in position. This floating foundation is compatible with all wind turbines without any modification and has reduced dimensions (from 36 to 55 metres per side for a wind turbine between 2 and 8 MW). Manufacturable in concrete or steel, this floating foundation allows for local construction near project sites.

Ideol leads the FLOATGEN project, a floating wind turbine demonstration project based on Ideol's technology, built by Bouygues Travaux Publics and operational off the coast of Le Croisic on the offshore experimentation site of Ecole Centrale de Nantes (SEM-REV). The construction of this project, France's first offshore wind turbine with a capacity of 2 MW, was completed in April 2018 and the unit installed on site in August 2018. For the month of February 2020, it had an availability of 95% and a capacity factor of 66%.

In August 2018, Hibiki, the second demonstrator with an aerodyn Energiesysteme GmbH 3.2 MW 2-bladed wind turbine was installed 15 km east of the port of Kitakyushu by Japanese conglomerate Hitachi Zosen. Ideol developed the design for this steel hull that was manufactured in a Japanese dry dock.

In August 2017, the French government selected Eolmed, a consortium led by French renewable energy developer Quadran in association with Ideol, Bouygues Travaux Publics and Senvion, for the development and construction of a 25MW Mediterranean floating offshore wind farm 15 km off the coastal town of Gruissan (Languedoc-Roussillon), planned to be commissioned 2020.

=== VolturnUS ===
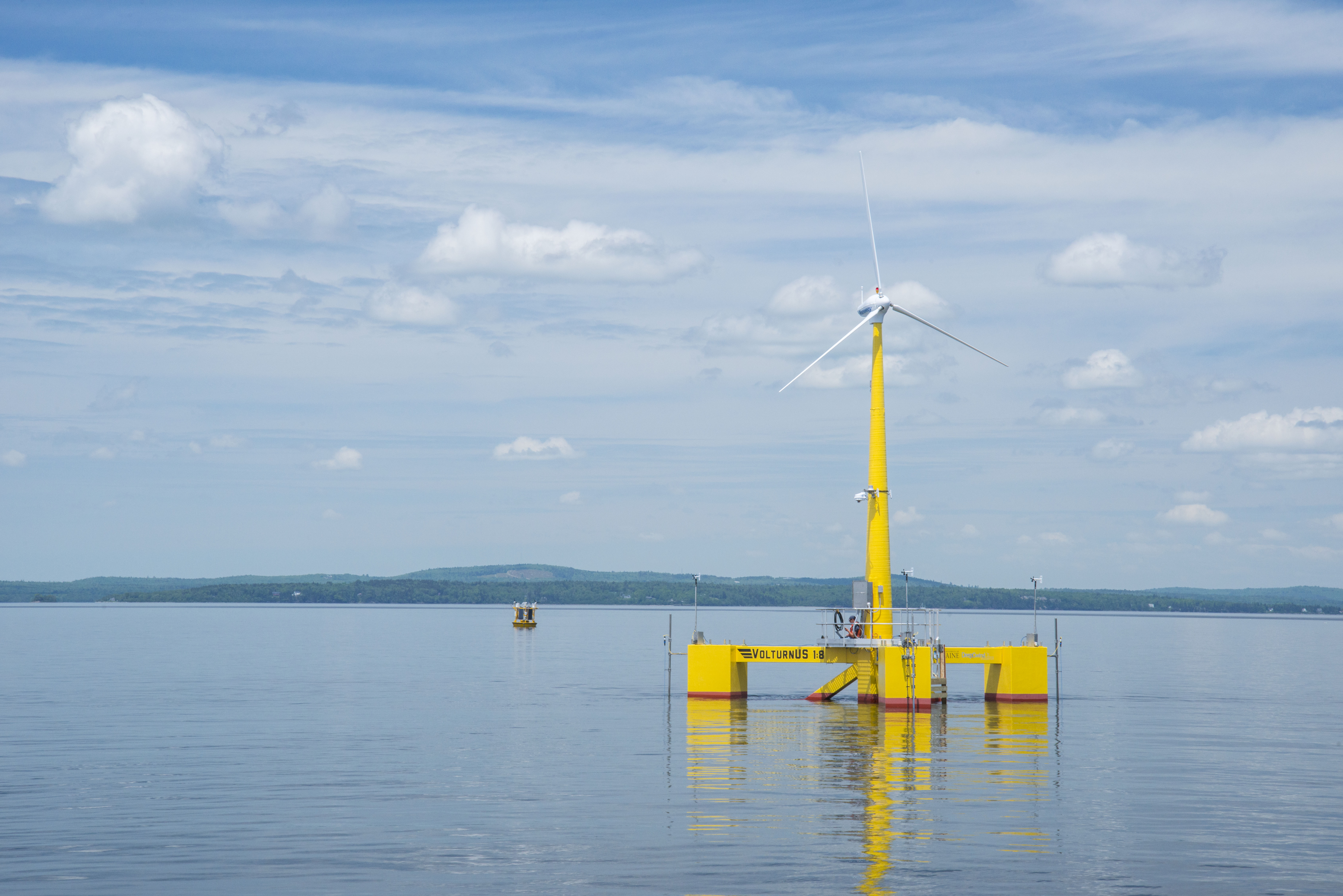
The VolturnUS design utilizes a concrete semi-submersible floating hull and a composite materials tower designed to reduce both capital and Operation & Maintenance costs, and to allow local manufacturing.

VolturnUS is North America's first floating grid-connected wind turbine. It was lowered into the Penobscot River in Maine on 31 May 2013 by the University of Maine Advanced Structures and Composites Center and its partners. During its deployment, it experienced numerous storm events representative of design environmental conditions prescribed by the American Bureau of Shipping (ABS) Guide for Building and Classing Floating Offshore Wind Turbines, 2013.

The VolturnUS floating concrete hull technology can support wind turbines in water depths of 45 m or more. With 12 independent cost estimates from around the U.S. and the world, it has been found to significantly reduce costs compared to existing floating systems. The design has also received a complete third-party engineering review.

In June 2016, the UMaine-led New England Aqua Ventus I project won top tier status from the US Department of Energy (DOE) Advanced Technology Demonstration Program for Offshore Wind. This means that the Aqua Ventus project is now automatically eligible for an additional $39.9 Million in construction funding from the DOE, as long as the project continues to meet its milestones.

=== WindFloat ===
External videos
- A video describing the WindFloat.

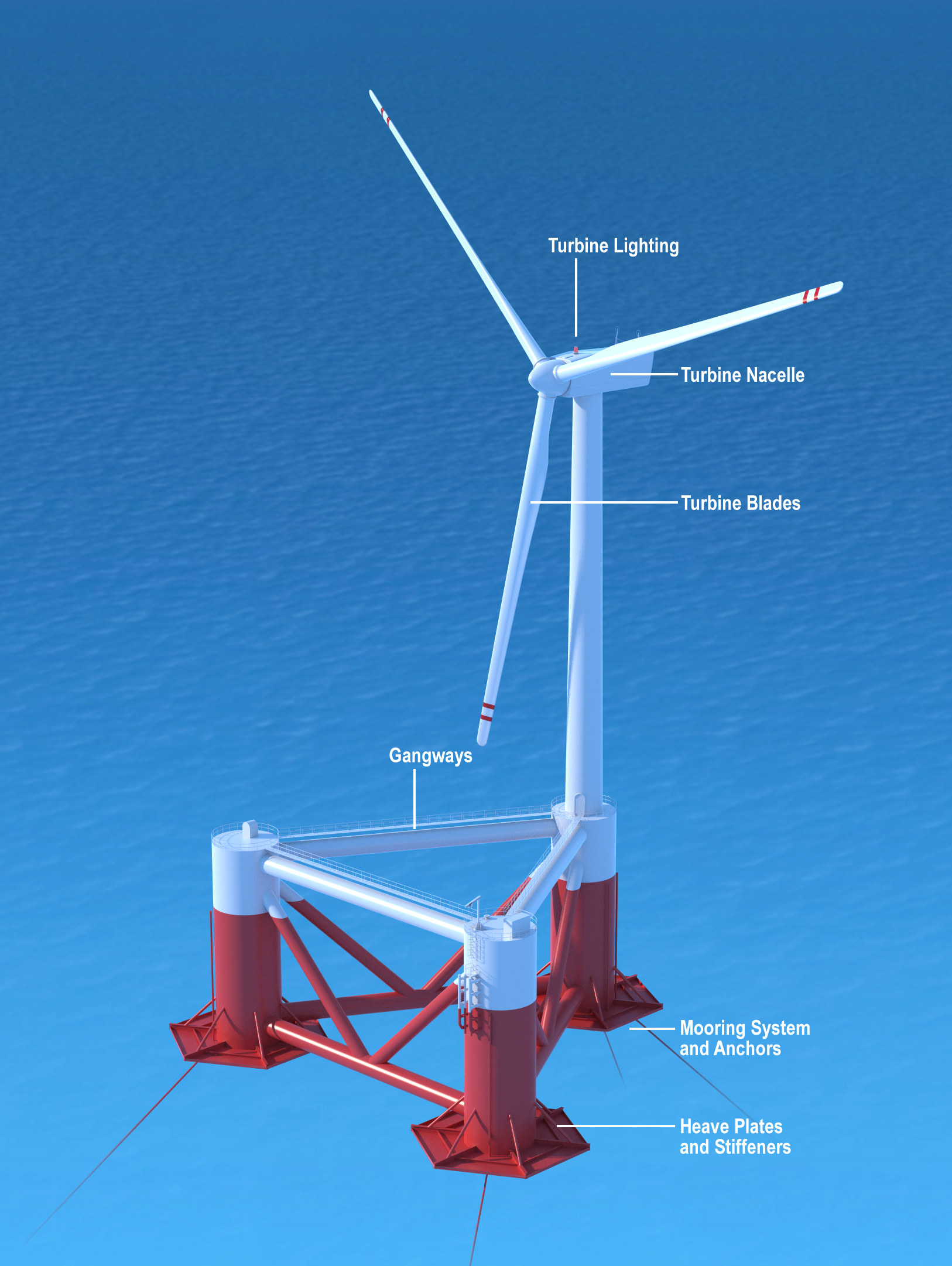
A diagram of the WindFloat system.

WindFloat is a floating foundation for offshore wind turbines designed and patented by Principle Power. A full-scale prototype was constructed in 2011 by Windplus, a joint-venture between EDP, Repsol, Principle Power, A. Silva Matos, Inovcapital, and FAI. The complete system was assembled and commissioned onshore including the turbine. The entire structure was then wet-towed 400 kilometres (250 mi) (from southern to northern Portugal) to its final installed location 5 kilometres (3.1 mi) offshore of Aguçadoura, Portugal, previously the Aguçadoura Wave Farm. The WindFloat was equipped with a Vestas v80 2.0-megawatt turbine and installation was completed on 22 October 2011. A year later, the turbine had produced 3 GWh. The cost of this project is around €20 million (about US$26 million). This single wind turbine can produce energy equivalent for 1300 homes. It operated until 2016, and survived storms without damage.

Principle Power was planning a 30-MW WindFloat project in 2013 using 6-MW Siemens turbines in 366 m of water near Coos Bay, Oregon to be operational in 2017, but the project has since been cancelled.

The subsea metal structure is reported to improve dynamic stability, whilst still maintaining shallow draft, by dampening wave– and turbine–induced motion utilizing a tri-column triangular platform with the wind turbine positioned on one of the three columns. The triangular platform is then "moored" using a conventional catenary mooring consisting of four lines, two of which are connected to the column supporting the turbine, thus creating an "asymmetric mooring." As the wind shifts direction and changes the loads on the turbine and foundation, a secondary hull-trim system shifts ballast water between each of the three columns. This permits the platform to maintain even keel while producing the maximum amount of energy. This is in contrast to other floating concepts which have implemented control strategies that de-power the turbine to compensate for changes in turbine thrust-induced overturning moment. This technology could allow wind turbines to be sited in offshore areas that were previously considered inaccessible, areas having water depth exceeding 40 m and more powerful wind resources than shallow-water offshore wind farms typically encounter.

A 25 MW WindFloat project received government permission in December 2016, with EU funding the €48 million transmission cable. The €100 million project is expected to be funded by 2017 and operational by 2019. Three structures with 8 MW Vestas turbines were towed to sea in 2019.

A WindFloat with a 2 MW Vestas turbine installed near Scotland began delivering power in late 2018.

By January 2020, the first of WindFloat's three 8.4-megawatt MHI Vestas turbines was in operation. Power is transmitted to a substation 12 miles away on shore, through a cable anchored to the seabed at a depth of about 100 meters.

=== TetraSub ===
An open source project was proposed by former Siemens director Henrik Stiesdal in 2015 to be assessed by DNV GL. It has tension leg platforms with replaceable pressurized tanks anchored to sheet walls, assembled from smaller modules. Shell and Tepco are partners in the project, with the TetraSpar prototype built in Grenaa and commissioned in Norway in December 2021 with a 65 meter draught in 200 meter water depth, using a 3.6 MW Siemens turbine. By 2024, it has an overall capacity factor of 54%, and an availability of 97—99%. The platform is included in a 92 MW UK project that won CfD at €250/MWh in January 2026.

=== Twin rotor floating wind turbine ===
Mingyang OceanX is designed with twin rotors to generate 16.6 MW and can withstand category 5 hurricane up to 260 km/h winds with waves as high as 30 meters. It was towed to sea in August 2024.

== Floating design concepts ==
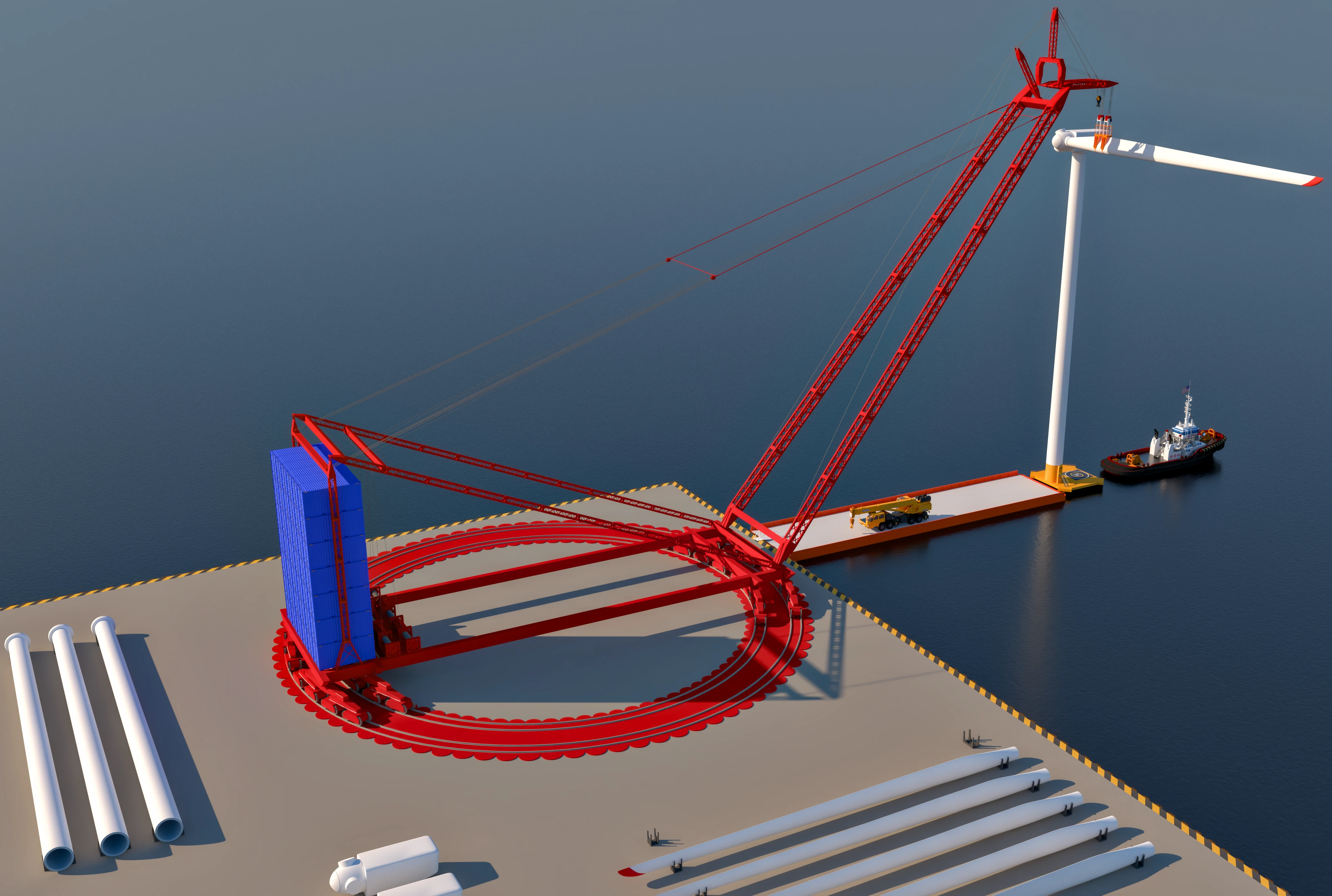
3D design of a ring crane doing shoreline assembly of an offshore wind turbine

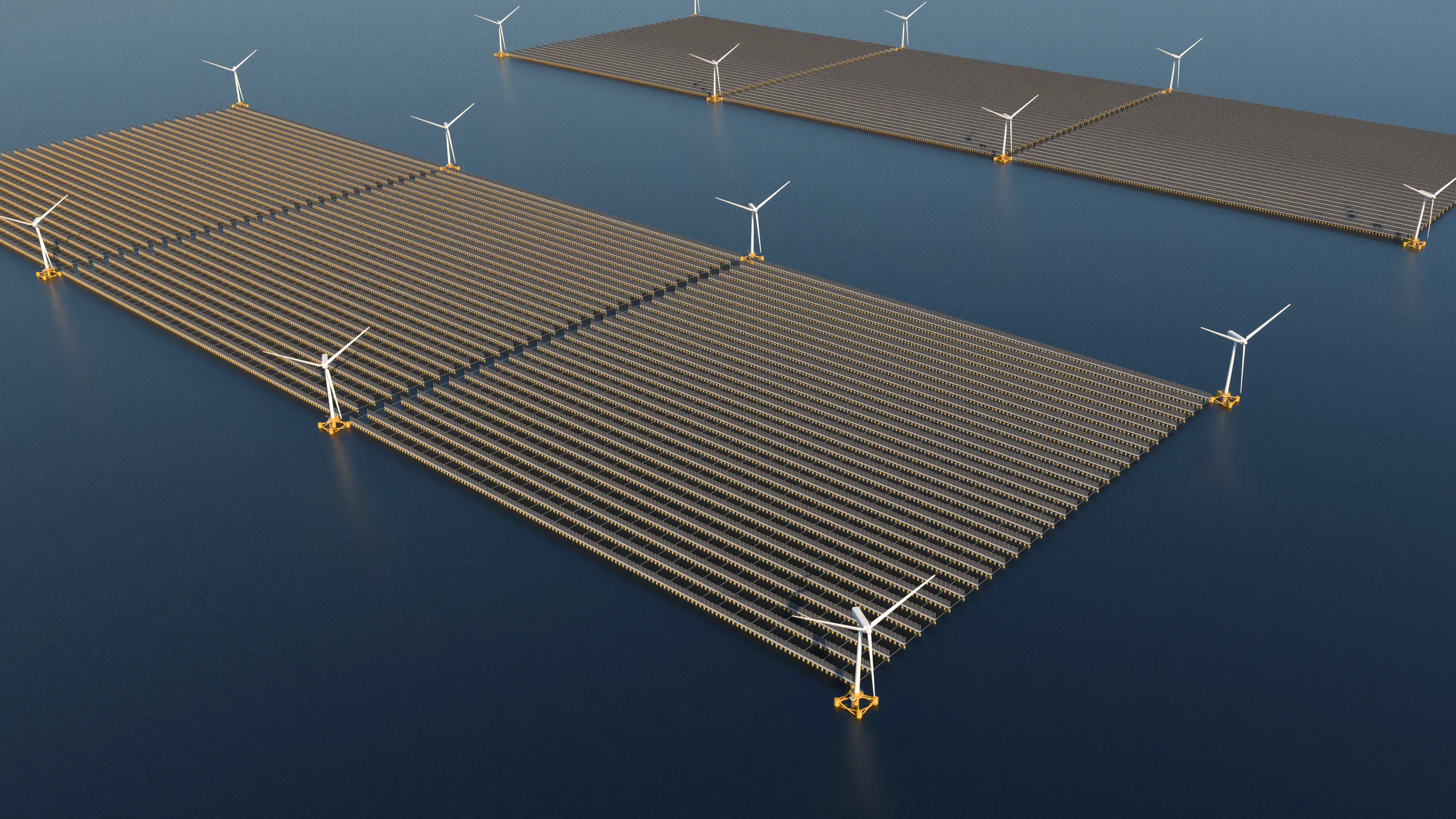
Vertical bifacial floating solar with offshore wind turbines have a lot of potential on the Great Lakes

=== DeepWind ===
Risø DTU National Laboratory for Sustainable Energy and 11 international partners started a 4-year program called DeepWind in October 2010 to create and test economical floating Vertical Axis Wind Turbines up to 20 MW. The program is supported with €3 million through EUs Seventh Framework Programme. Partners include TUDelft, Aalborg University, SINTEF, Equinor and United States National Renewable Energy Laboratory.

=== Flowocean ===
Flowocean is a Swedish technology company with its own proprietary technology for floating offshore wind power with head office in the city of Västerås, Sweden. FLOW is a semi-submersible floating offshore wind turbine technology with two wind turbine generators on one floating platform. The structure weather vanes passively so that the wind turbines always face the wind. Flow technology is a combination of Tension Leg Platform(TLP) and Semi-Submersible which gives the Flow unit the benefits of both principles and allows the unit to be robust and light.

Flowocean has developed a patented design for floating offshore wind power plants aiming to make floating offshore wind power cost-effective. FLOW can be considered an assembly of three systems, the floater, the buoy and the mooring system. The floater is all structure that is rotating. The buoy is of turret type, is moored to the sea bed and contains a bearing that allows the floater to rotate freely around it. The mooring system is the set of components that anchors the buoy to the sea bed, i.e. mooring lines/ropes/chains, chain stoppers and anchors. The FLOW units are highly standardised with all sub-systems well proven. Inter-array wind farm cabling and mooring systems are shared between the units.

=== GICON ===
The GICON-TLP is a floating substructure system based on a tension leg platform (TLP) developed by GICON GmbH. The system is deployable from 45 meters to 350 meters water depth. It consists of six major components: four buoyancy bodies, horizontal pipes for structural base, vertical pipes which pass through the water line, angled piles for connection with the transition piece. Cast nodes are used to connect all components. The TLP can be equipped with an offshore wind turbine in range of 6–10 MW.

The GICON-TLP is anchored to the seabed via four pre-tensioned mooring ropes with a buoyant gravity-base anchor consisting of concrete. No pile driving or drilling for anchoring is necessary. All ropes are connected at the corners of the square based system. The TLP for a 6MW wind turbine is currently being developed by the GICON Group and their key partner, the Endowed Chair for Wind Energy Technology (LWET) at the University of Rostock, utilizing prefabricated steel-concrete composite components in combination with components of steel. A main focus of the TLP design is on the modularity and the possibility of assembly in any dry dock near to the installation site and without the use of construction vessels. After offshore location is reached, joints of TLP and anchor will be decoupled and the gravity anchor will be lowered down by using ballast water. Once the anchor has reached the bottom, it is filled with sand. One unique feature of the system is the sufficient floating stability during transport as well as during operations.

In October 2017, model tests took place in the model test facility of French École Centrale de Nantes (ECN) with 1:50 model of the GICON®-TLP incl. wind turbine. Based on this test a Technology readiness level of 5 was reached.

=== Nautica Windpower ===
Nautica Windpower has proposed a technique for potentially reducing system weight, complexity and costs for deepwater sites. Scale model tests in open water have been conducted (September 2007) in Lake Erie and structural dynamics modeling was done in 2010 for larger designs. Nautica Windpower's Advanced Floating Turbine (AFT) uses a single mooring line and a downwind two-bladed rotor configuration that is deflection tolerant and aligns itself with the wind without an active yaw system. Two-bladed, downwind turbine designs that can accommodate flexibility in the blades will potentially prolong blade lifetime, diminish structural system loads and reduce offshore maintenance needs, yielding lower lifecycle costs.

=== SATH Technology ===
Saitec Offshore Technologies develops SATH (Swinging Around Twin Hull) a technology based on three fundamental principles: the use of concrete, the geometry of the floaters, and the single mooring system. It may overcome the limitations and challenges found in the current existing technologies used by wind farms: it attempts to remove the barriers related to water depth, reduce both CapEx and OpEx and enhance local content. A 2 MW test turbine began operating in 2023.

=== SeaTwirl ===
SeaTwirl develops a floating vertical-axis wind turbine (VAWT). The design intended to store energy in a flywheel, thus, energy could be produced even after the wind stopped blowing. The floater is based on a SPAR solution and is rotating along with the turbine. The concept limits the need for moving parts as well as bearings in the hub region. SeaTwirl is based in Gothenburg Sweden and is registered on the European growth market First North. SeaTwirl deployed its first floating grid connected wind turbine off the coast of Sweden in August 2011. It was tested and decommissioned. In 2015 SeaTwirl launched a 30 kW prototype in the archipelago of Sweden which is connected to the grid at Lysekil. The company aimed to scale the concept with a turbine of 1MW size in 2020. The concept is scalable for sizes well over 10MW.

=== Seawind Ocean Technology ===
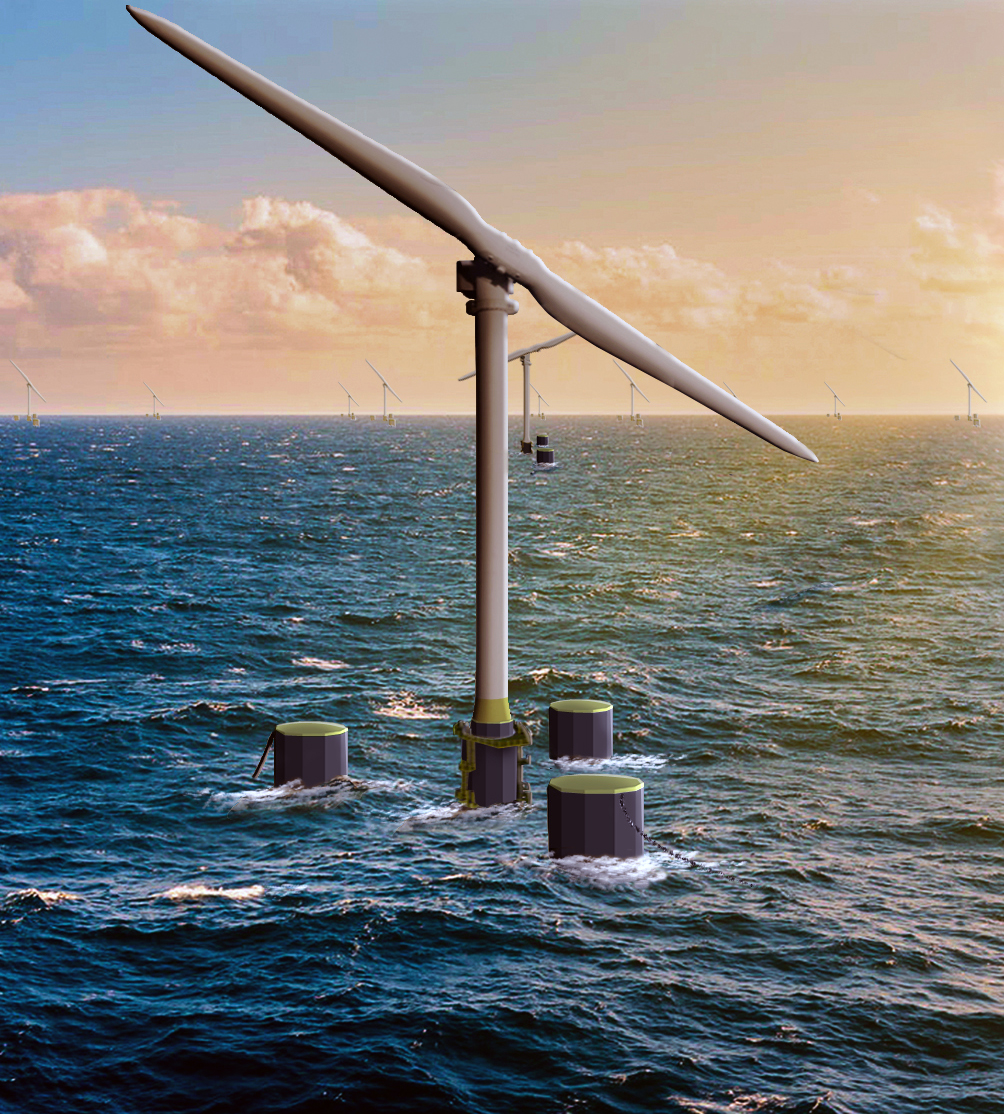
Seawind's integrated turbine, tower, & substructure.

Seawind Ocean Technology B.V. was established in Netherlands by Martin Jakubowski and Silvestro Caruso - the founders of Blue H Technologies. They acquired the proprietary rights to the two-bladed floating turbine technology developed by Blue H Technologies, the world's first floating wind turbine that was installed in 2007. Founded on original research and development work by NASA, Hamilton Standard (now United Technologies Corporation/Raytheon Technologies), Enel, and Aeritalia, Seawind's offshore wind power turbines with integrated foundations have been patented, proven at 1.5 MW – Gamma 60 wind turbine, and achieved Type D DNV GL certification in December 2019. Two-bladed floating wind turbines (6.2 MW and 12.2 MW) are being developed, suitable for installation in deep waters with extreme wind conditions. The technology stems from Glidden Doman’s flexible two-bladed turbine system design that is compliant with the forces of nature rather than resistant to them. The robust design simplicity, which supports higher turbine rotation speeds, achieves lower torque, lower fatigue, a lighter drive train, and a longer life due to its teetering hub technology. The teetering hub technology works in conjunction with a yaw power control system that eliminates all blade pitch control mechanisms. Seawind's predecessor wind turbines include the Gamma 60 wind turbine, the world's first variable speed wind turbine with a teetering hinge, and the WTS-4, which set a world wind turbine power output record that held for over 20 years.

=== Floating Multi-Turbine Platform ===
Floating multi-turbine platforms can accommodate multiple wind turbines on a single platform to reduce installation and mooring costs.

=== Others ===
A combined floating wave and wind power plant was installed at Vindeby Offshore Wind Farm in 2010.

The International Energy Agency (IEA), under the auspices of their Offshore Code Comparison Collaboration (OC3) initiative, completed high-level design and simulation modeling of the OC-3 Hywind system in 2010, a 5-MW wind turbine to be installed on a floating spar buoy, moored with catenary mooring lines, in water depth of 320 metres. The spar buoy platform would extend 120 metres below the surface and the mass of such a system, including ballast would exceed 7.4 million kg.

VertiWind is a floating vertical axis wind turbine design created by Nenuphar whose mooring system and floater are designed by Technip.

Tugdock Limited receives support from Cornwall and Isles of Scilly development agency Marine-i providing support to the Tugdock platform designed to help with the building and launching of floating offshore wind turbines.

== See also ==
- Airborne wind turbine
- Floating nuclear power station
- Floating solar
- List of offshore wind farms
- Ocean thermal energy conversion
- Offshore wind port
- Offshore wind power
- Ring crane
- Wind power
- Wind turbine installation vessel

== Bibliography ==
- Thomas, Torsten (2014). "Solutions for floating foundations". Ship & Offshore (5). Hamburg: DVV Media Group: 30–33. ISSN 2191-0057.
