= Hywind Scotland =

Wind farm off Peterhead, Scotland

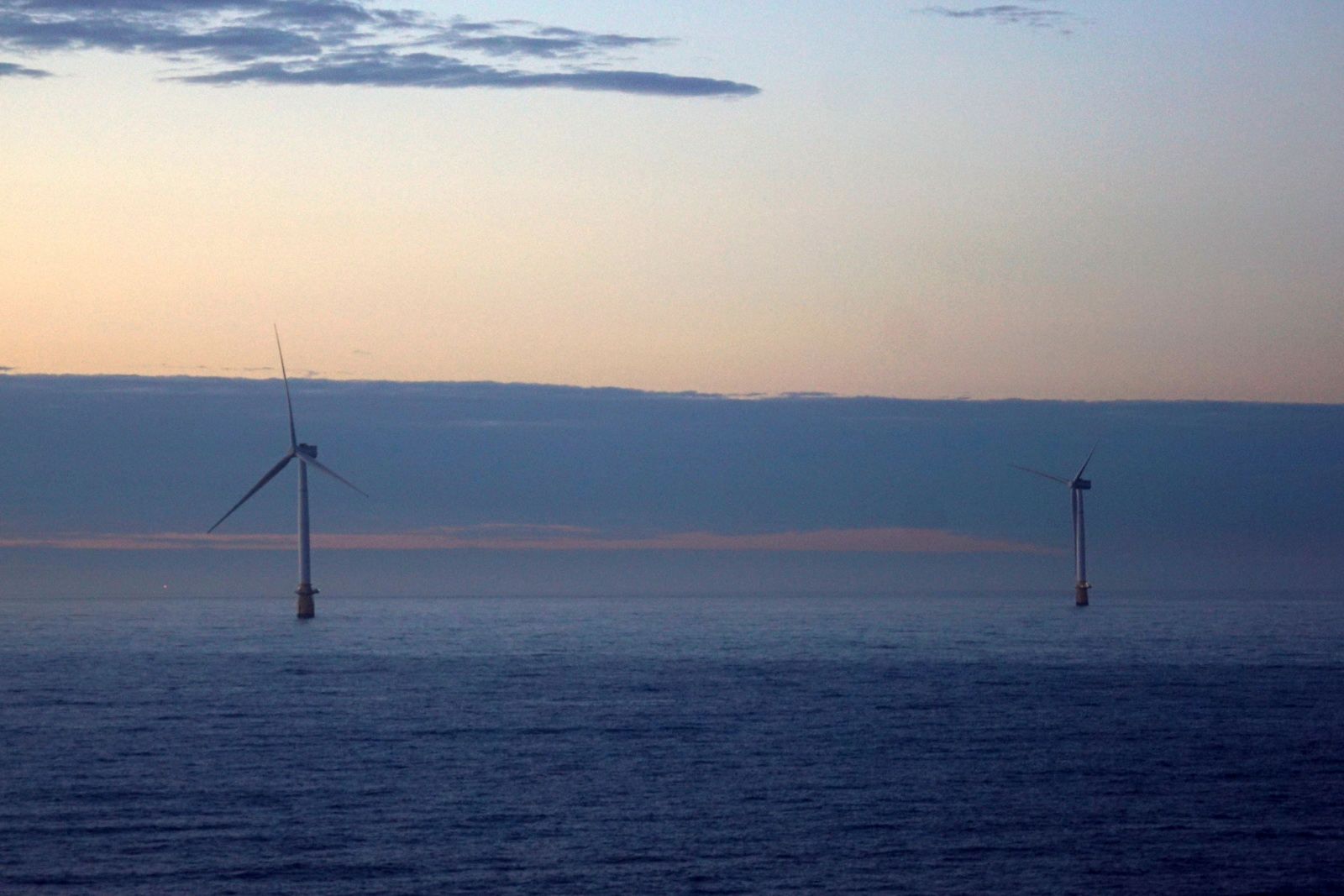
- Country: Scotland, United Kingdom
- Location: Scotland, Grampian
- Coordinates: 57°28′59″N 01°21′00″W
- Status: Operational
- Construction began: 2016
- Commission date: October 2017
- Construction cost: £264m
- Owners: Equinor (75%); Masdar (25%)
- Operator: Hywind (Scotland) Limited

Wind farm
- Type: Offshore
- Max. water depth: 95–120 m (312–394 ft)
- Distance from shore: 25 km (16 mi)
- Hub height: 101 m (331 ft)
- Rotor diameter: 154 m (505 ft)
- Rated wind speed: 10.1 m/s (36 km/h)
- Site area: 15 km^{2} (5.8 sq mi)

Power generation
- Units operational: 5 x 6 MW
- Make and model: Siemens Wind Power SWT-6.0-154
- Units planned: 5 × 6 MW
- Nameplate capacity: 30 MW
- Capacity factor: 54%

Buchan Deep

Hywind Scotland is the world's first commercial wind farm using floating wind turbines, situated 29 kilometres (18 mi) off Peterhead, Scotland. The farm has five 6 MW Siemens direct-drive turbines on Hywind floating monopiles, with a total capacity of 30 MW. It is operated by Hywind (Scotland) Limited, a joint venture of Equinor (75%) and Masdar (25%).

Equinor (then: Statoil) launched the world's first operational deep-water floating large-capacity wind turbine in 2009, the 2.3 MW Hywind, which cost 400 million NOK (US$71 million, $31/W). The 120 metres (390 ft) tall tower with a 2.3 MW Siemens turbine was towed from the Åmøy fjord and 10 kilometres (6.2 mi) offshore into the North Sea in 220 metres (720 ft) deep water, off of Stavanger, Norway on 9 June 2009 for a two-year test run, but remains working at the site while surviving 40 m/s (89 mph) wind speed and 19 m waves.

In 2015, the company received permission to install the wind farm in Scotland, in an attempt at reducing the cost relative to the original Hywind, in accordance with the Scottish Government's commitment for cost reduction. Manufacturing for the project, with a budgeted cost of NOK2 billion (£152m), started in 2016 in Spain, Norway and Scotland. The turbines were assembled in Stord Municipality in Norway in summer 2017 using the Saipem 7000 floating crane, and the finished turbines were moved to near Peterhead. Three suction anchors hold each turbine, measuring 16 metres in height, 5 metres in diameter, and weighing 300 tonnes each. Hywind Scotland was commissioned in October 2017.

While cost was reduced compared to the very expensive Hywind One at $31m/MW, it still came with a final capital cost of £264m, or £8.8m/MW, approximately three times the capital cost of fixed offshore windfarms. Measured by unit cost, Hywind's levelized cost of electricity (LCoE) is then £180/MWh ($248/MWh), about three times the typical LCoE of a fixed offshore wind farm at £55/MWh ($75.7/MWh). The high cost is partly compensated by £165.27/MWh from Renewable Obligation Certificates.

In its first 5 years of operation the facility has averaged a capacity factor of 54%, sometimes in 10 meter waves. By shutting down at the worst conditions, it survived Hurricane Ophelia, and then Storm Caroline with wind gusts at 160 km/h (99 mph) and waves of 8.2 metres.

The subsequent 88 MW Hywind Tampen (with concrete floating foundations) became operational at the Snorre and Gullfaks oil fields in Norway in 2023 at a cost of NOK 8 billion or £600m (£6.8/MW).

In May 2024 all 5 turbines were to be towed back to Norway for several months of the heavy maintenance of replacing the main bearings. All turbines were operating again by October 2024.

== See also ==
- Offshore wind power
