= Kalheim =

Kalheim is a Norwegian surname. Notable people with the surname include:

- Ragnar Kalheim (1926–1974), Norwegian trade unionist and politician
- Sigurd Kalheim (1927–2007), Norwegian politician
- Terje Kalheim (born 1952), Norwegian trade unionist and politician
