= Bernt Stilluf Karlsen =

Norwegian businessperson and politician

Bernt Stilluf Karlsen (born 25 April 1950) is a Norwegian businessperson and politician for the Liberal Party.

He holds the siv.øk. degree from the Norwegian School of Economics and military training from the Befalsskolen for Infanteriet i Sør-Norge. He has been an executive in Vard, Maritime Group, Iko, Aker Norcem and Saga. He has also worked as a civil servant in the Ministry of the Environment, the Ministry of Industry and as secretary in the Standing Committee on Local Government. From 1995 to 1999 he worked as a partner and broker in Fondsfinans. He has thereafter been an adviser in ProCorp, which notably was contracted by Yukos Oil in 2001.

He joined the Liberal Party in 1973, was deputy chair of the Young Liberals of Norway and was named by them as the Liberal Party's representative in Oslo Port Authority; he has chaired the board since 1999. He also chaired Oslo Sporveier from 2006 to 2007 and Ruter from 2012. From 1999 to 2000 he was a member of the Committee on Defence Policy named by Bondevik's First Cabinet. He has also been a board member of Dagbladet.

He resides on a small farm at Krokskogen in northern Bærum.
