= Hywind =

Floating wind turbine off Karmøy, Norway

Unitech Zefyros (Hywind Demo)
- Country: Norway
- Location: Karmøy
- Coordinates: 59°8′25.1″N 05°01′46.5″E
- Status: Operating
- Construction cost: Over 400m NOK
- Owner: Unitech Offshore

Wind farm
- Type: Floating offshore
- Max. water depth: 210 m (690 ft)
- Distance from shore: 10 km (6.2 miles)
- Hub height: 65 m (213 ft)
- Rotor diameter: 82.4 m (270 ft)
- Rated wind speed: 13 m/s (43 ft/s)

Power generation
- Units operational: 1 × 2.3 MW
- Make and model: SWT-2.3-82

Hywind was the first MW-class floating wind turbine concept, developed by StatoilHydro (now Equinor). It has a rated power of 2.3 megawatts (MW), and is mounted on a spar foundation derived from oil platforms. The basic development was done by Norsk Hydro, hence the name. The Hywind turbines are designed to be installed offshore in water depths of 120–700 metres.

The first pilot Hywind turbine was installed and commissioned in the North Sea, 10 km (6.2 miles) south-west of Karmøy, south-west Norway, in September 2009.

In 2019, the turbine was acquired by Unitech Offshore and renamed the Unitech Zefyros. It will be used for development and testing of new technologies, and as a hub to connect other turbines in the Marine Energy Test Centre (METCentre) test site for offshore wind turbines.

Following the single turbine demonstration, the Hywind Scotland and Hywind Tampen wind farms have been constructed.

== Device concept ==
The Hywind platform is a spar-buoy type floating foundation, a slender vertical cylinder that extends 100 metres (330 ft) below the sea surface. This is anchored to the seabed with three cables, with slack moorings allowing the turbine to move sideways in surge and sway. The foundation is however designed, with the centre of gravity is below the sea surface, to prevent the turbine from pitching and rolling or from heaving up-and-down, all of which could mean the blades hitting the water.

This type of foundation has been used for oil and gas platforms for many years. It is similar to that used in the Troll B & C platforms. The position of Hywind is monitored using GPS.

A standard Siemens Wind Power offshore wind turbine is mounted on top of the foundation.

The Hywind concept was originally developed by marine engineer Dagfinn Sveen in 2001, at Norsk Hydro's new energy department. The concept was patented and industrial relations were established with Siemens, among others. When Statoil (now Equinor) took over Norsk Hydro's oil division in 2008, Hywind was also transferred.

== Demo-project ==
The Hywind demo project consists of the wind turbine, the floating foundation and anchors as well as a connection cable to shore. The floating structure was developed, built, and installed by the French engineering company Technip, while the actual construction was carried out by the Finnish subsidiary Technip Pori.

Of the total weight of approx. 5,300 tonnes, approximately 3,500 tonnes consists of ballast, mainly olivine with a density of 2.6 t/m^{3}. The wind turbine is a standard Siemens 2.3 MW wind turbine with Statoil's proprietary control system. Nexans Norway has supplied and installed the 13-kilometre cable that supplies power to the local grid supplier Haugaland Kraft. The cable comes ashore near Skudeneshavn on the southern tip of Karmøy.

The investment amounts to almost NOK 400 million (around US$62 million) to build and deploy., of which NOK 59 million is support from the Norwegian government through Enova. Statoil receives income from electricity production, but this is not the primary focus of the project. The main purpose is to gain experience from full-scale power production from floating wind turbines, and is one of several of Statoil's focus areas within renewable energy.

The core competences Statoil has gained as a leading offshore oil and gas operator have proven to be of great importance for the development of the Hywind concept. These areas of expertise, combined with our financial strength and ability to innovate, mean that Statoil is well positioned to develop this project.

— Statoil

Equinor estimates that floating wind turbines in the North Sea will deliver the equivalent of 4,000 full load hours — which corresponds to a production of 46% of installed capacity. For a 2.3 MW wind turbine, as in the pilot project, this would mean an annual production of 9.2 GWh. In order to obtain the best possible wind data, Statoil has entered into a collaboration with the Norwegian Meteorological Institute and Kjeller Vindteknikk for measuring and forecasting wind and waves. The Norwegian Meteorological Institute has set up special versions of its numerical weather models that include measurement data from Statoil's 100-metre-high wind measuring mast on Karmøy, as well as the wave and current measuring buoy at Hywind. In addition, a LIDAR on Utsira will be used to assess the quality of the wind forecasts.

As the wind turbine is floating, the wind and waves will cause movement in all six degrees of freedom of motion. The movement leads to complicated dynamic loads on the wind turbine and tower, and is one of the most important test areas for the project as this is difficult to calculate correctly with computer-aided design. In the Autumn of 2005, model tests were carried out at Marintek (now SINTEF) in Trondheim with a 1:47 scale model.

=== The First Turbine ===
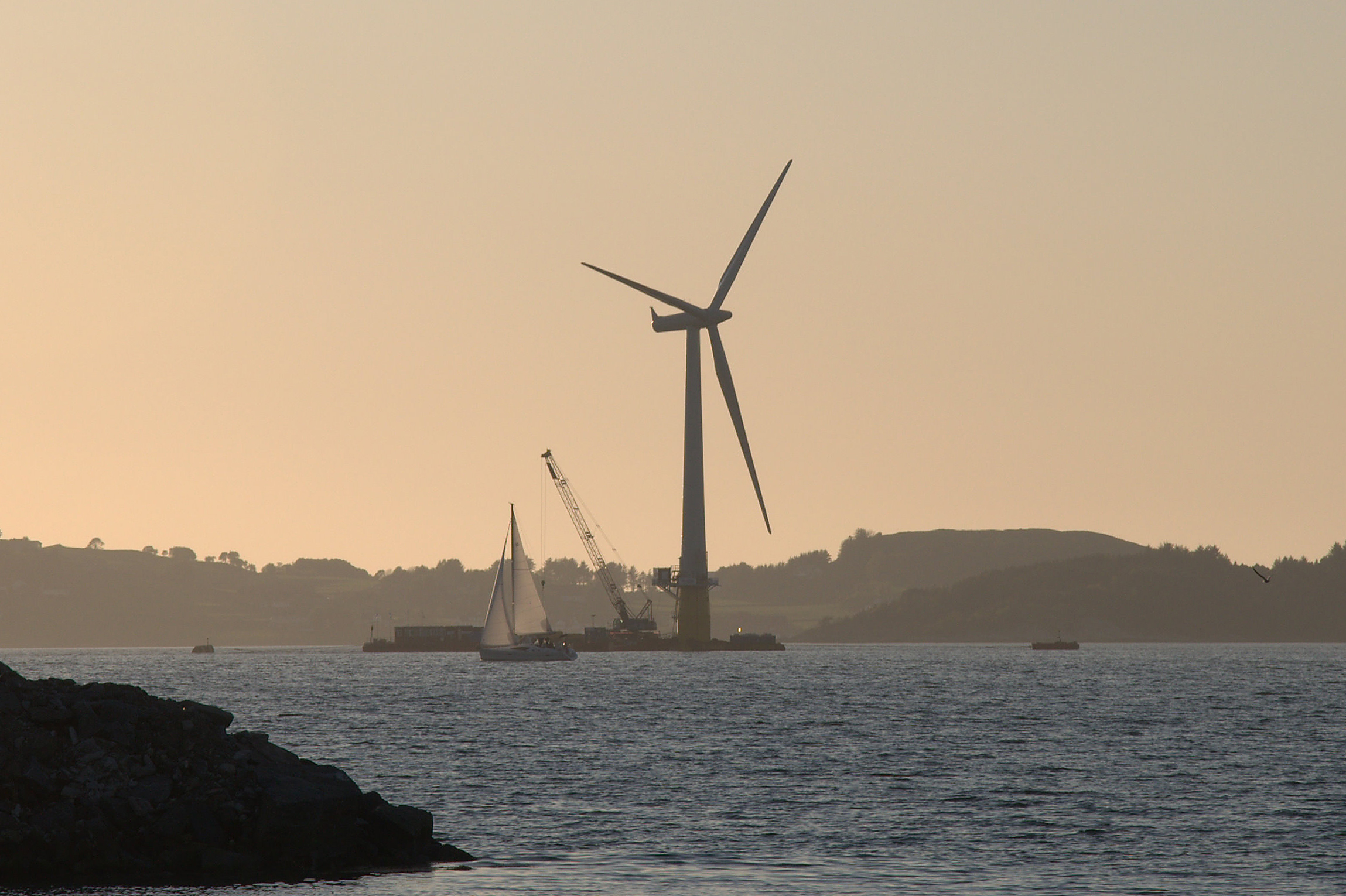
The Hywind turbine after assembly in Åmøyfjorden. Credit: Lars Christopher

The floating foundation was built in Finland, then was towed floating horizontally to Norway. In the Åmøyfjord near Stavanger, the spar foundation was then rotated vertically on 23 April 2009, and ballasted. The wind turbine was then mounted on top of the floating structure. On 6 June 2009, the entire structure was towed approximately 10 km south west of Karmøy, where it was anchored with three anchors at a depth of approximately 220 metres. This was initially for a two-year test deployment.

The 13-kilometre (8.1 mi) long submarine power transmission cable was installed in July 2009 and system test including rotor blades and initial power transmission was conducted shortly thereafter.

The turbine was connected to the grid in August, with the official inauguration on 8 September 2009.

The first full year the turbine was in trial operation, 2010, it delivered 7.3 GWh against the expected 3.5 GWh. The turbine was exposed to waves up to 11 m and proved more stable than expected. The floating installation does not place greater loads on the turbine than an onshore installation, and vibration loads are reduced compared to land-based turbines.

By 2016, the turbine had produced 50 GWh; an overall capacity factor of 41%. The turbine survived 40 m/s wind speed and wave 19 metres (62 ft) high.

In 2019, the turbine was sold to Unitech Offshore, with the expectation of 10 more years of production and tests. In 2022, Unitech mounted a helicopter pad on the turbine, the first time for a floating offshore wind turbine.

Wind turbine specifications
Wind turbine	Siemens SWT-2.3-82
Rated capacity	2.3 MW
Weight of turbine	138 tonne
Nacelle height	65 metres (213 ft)
Nacelle weight	82 tonne
Rotor diameter	82.4 metres (270 ft)
Rotor weight	54 tonne
Rotor speed	6-18 revolutions per minute
Foundation depth below sea level	100 metres (328 ft)
Total weigh and displacement	5,388 tonne (3,516 tonne ballast)
Foundation diameter at water line	6 metres (20 ft)
Foundation diameter at kel	8.3 metres (27 ft)
Natural periods	surge: 125 seconds, heave: 27.4 seconds, pitch: 23.9 seconds
Water depth	210 metres (689 ft)
Moorings	Three lines (chain and wire) with crow-foot anchors

=== Full-scale measurements ===
The Hywind demo was extensively instrumented to see how it behaved compared to calculations made with time-domain simulation software. More than 200 sensors were used. Some of the conclusions are that, with a few exceptions, it is possible to calculate the movements well. The exceptions are related to anchoring, where the response for long wave periods is much larger than in the analyses, while in the wave period range the measured response is smaller than what the analyses show. Furthermore, the statistical differences between simulated and measured wind turbine parameters are relatively large, but within acceptable limits given the uncertainties.

== Further development ==
Due to the success of the project, Equinor moved to the next phase where the focus was on cost reduction and on increasing the number of possible site options by reducing the minimum depth to 100 metres or less.

The next phase was a farm with three to five turbines, with both Scotland and Maine considered as possible locations in 2015-16. The Hywind 2 project in Maine was abandoned, with Statiol citing legislative changes as the reason. A new bill (LD 1472) would allow the University of Maine to bid in a second round competitive auction for an offshore wind project in the state’s waters. However, Statoil built five 6 MW floating turbines, deployed in the Hywind Scotland project in 2017 at 70 per cent lower cost.
