= Oslo Port Authority =

- Interactive map of Oslo Port Authority

Location
- Country: Norway
- Location: Oslo
- Coordinates: 59.902205°N 10.7407683°E

Details
- Opened: 2004
- Employees: 123 (June 2015)
- Port Director: Anne Sigrid Hamran

Statistics
- Annual container volume: 200,000 TEU's (2013)
- Passenger traffic: 6,500,000 people annually (2013)
- Website http://www.oslohavn.no

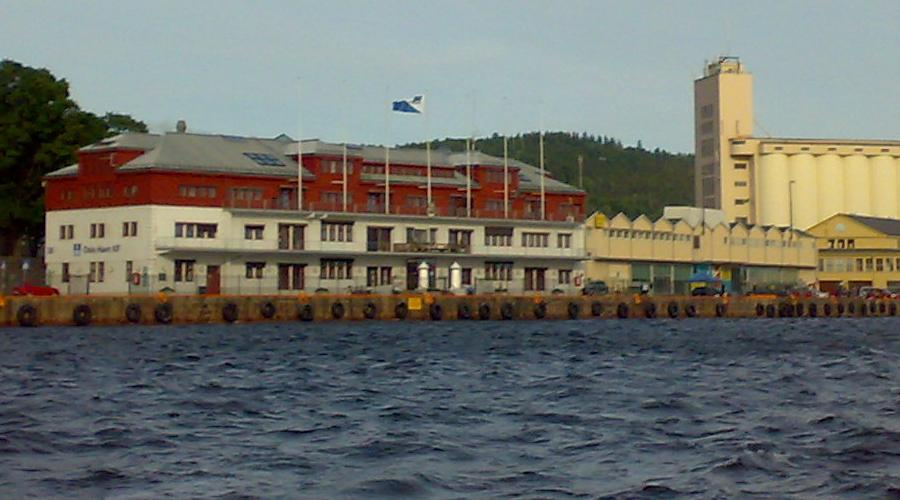
Oslo Havn KF's main offices at Vippetangen

Oslo Port Authority (Norwegian: Oslo Havn KF) is a kommunalt foretak (municipal enterprise), and accountable to the Municipality of Oslo. For many years, Oslo Havn KF was known as Oslo havnevesen (OHV) but was renamed on June 8, 2004, to its current name.

As of 2021, the enterprise has around 100 employees and is managed by an elected board and a Port Director. The organisation as a whole is divided into: market, communication and environment, administration, finance and IT, real estate and urban development.

Oslo Havn KF's principal objectives are to ensure an effective and sustainable enterprise at the Port of Oslo by facilitating green and efficient maritime transport. Apart from the daily management of the port, it is also Oslo Havn KF's task to monitor the traffic in and out of the port and manage the port's estates in a responsible and sustainable manner.

== History ==
Oslo Havn KF was first established by a royal charter, on September 16, 1735. The current day enterprise was then created as an executive body, a Port Commission, which makes Oslo Havn KF one of Norway's oldest organisations still in existence. The Port Commission, Havnekommissionen, was responsible for overlooking all the ports within Oslo's jurisdiction. In the first few decades the work primary consisted of controlling the depth of the waters, dredging works and mooring equipment, but as the years passed its responsibilities multiplied.

== The Board ==
The highest authority in Oslo Havn KF is havnestyret, the executive board. The board consists of representatives from a range of positions; Oslo Municipality, the port's commercial users, employees and other nearby municipalities. On May 8, 2012, a new board was appointed with Bernt Stilluf Karlsen from the Norwegian Liberal Party as leader and Terje Kalheim from the Labour Party as deputy.

Anne Sigrid Hamran is Oslo Havn KF's Port Director and she has had the position since 2003.
