= Roar Jens Haugen =

Norwegian general (1943–2025)

- Born: 26 February 1943; Trondheim, Norway
- Died: 16 April 2025 (aged 82); Kongsberg, Norway
- Occupation: Army officer

Roar Jens Haugen (26 February 1943 – 16 April 2025) was a Norwegian military officer. He was inspector general of the Norwegian Army from 1998 to 2003.

== Life and career ==
Born in Trondheim on 26 February 1943, Haugen completed the infantry officer training school Befalsskolen for Infanteriet i Sør-Norge in 1962, and graduated from the Norwegian Military Academy in 1967. He later received further training at the NATO Defence College and the Norwegian Defence University College.

His assignments included officer at infantry battalions and Hærens Fallskjermjegerskole, instructor at the Norwegian Military Academy, and chief of intelligence staff at the Norwegian High Command. Promoted to the rank of major general and chief of the district command DKØ in 1998, he served as inspector general of the Norwegian Army from 1998 until his retirement in 2003.

During this period, the government, supported by the Storting, reduced military budgets dramatically. In his position as head of the army, he wrote a letter to the Minister of Defence Kristin Krohn Devold warning about severe negative consequences of the budget reductions.

Haugen died in Kongsberg on 16 April 2025, at the age of 82.
