= Bekken =

Bekken is a Norwegian surname. Notable people with the surname include:

- Einar Bekken (born 1946), Norwegian former ski jumper
- Elling Bekken (1840–1909), Norwegian Nordic skier
- Fredrik Bekken (born 1975), Norwegian former representative rower and Olympic medalist
- Harald Bekken (born 1942), Norwegian priest and politician
- Tor Einar Bekken (born 1964), Norwegian blues and jazz musician
