= SeaTwirl =

SeaTwirl is a vertical floating wind turbine that was tested off the west coast of Sweden in 2011. It is also the name of the company that produces the turbine.

== History ==
The design was developed by Daniel Ehrnberg. Chalmers University of Technology built a prototype and tested it at SSPA. A 30 kW (1/50 scale) third-generation anchored prototype rising 3 m above the water and reaching 7 m deep was installed off the west coast of Sweden near Halmstad in August 2011, tested successfully and de-commissioned. In 2022, Norway granted concession to install a 1 MW prototype in the Boknafjord.

== Design ==
SeaTwirl has a vertical axis, with blades above water and the generator below. It is one of several designs that can float and therefore be positioned far offshore and take advantage of the stronger winds there. The SeaTwirl design uses the seawater itself as a roller bearing and stores energy in a water-filled torus. The company intends to use the design to enable the use of cheaper and heavier materials to lower the cost below conventional turbines and generate energy even when the wind is not blowing.

If the design is scaled to 430 m long, the company claims that it could provide 4.5 MW of electricity and store 25 MWh of energy.

== See also ==
- Renewable energy
