= Hywind Tampen =

Floating wind farm off Bergen, Norway

- Country: Norway
- Location: North-west of Bergen
- Coordinates: 61°19′47.9″N 02°42′00″E
- Status: Operational
- Commission date: November 2022
- Owner: Equinor
- Operator: Equinor

Wind farm
- Max. water depth: 300 m (980 ft)
- Distance from shore: 140 km (87 mi)
- Rotor diameter: 176 m (577 ft)

Power generation
- Units operational: 11 × 8.6 MW
- Make and model: Siemens Games SG 8.0-167 DD
- Nameplate capacity: 88 MW
- Annual net output: 384 GWh

External links
- Website: www.equinor.com/no/what-we-do/hywind-tampen.html

Hywind Tampen is a floating offshore wind farm 140 km off the Norwegian coast in the North Sea owned by the Norwegian state-owned energy company, Equinor. The turbines are mounted on cylindrical concrete spar-buoy foundations.

The wind farm provides electricity for Equinor's Snorre (platform A and B) and Gullfaks (platforms A, B and C) oil and gas field; Snorre lies just North of the wind farm, and Gullfaks lies just South. Hywind Tampen is the world's first renewable energy power source for offshore oil and gas, and when commissioned was the world's largest floating offshore wind farm. At full capacity, Hywind Tampen will provide 35% of the electricity demand for Snorre and Gullfaks.

== Timeline ==
Equinor started developing and testing offshore wind installations in 2009, with their first 2.3 MW Hywind Demo project off of the island of Karmøy in south-west Norway. Equinor also owns the world's first commercial floating wind park, Hywind Scotland, off the coast of Peterhead, Scotland, commissioned in 2017. After full implementation and operation of the wind farm, Equinor will stand for 47% of global floating wind capacity.

The scheduled power production start was in the 3rd quarter of 2022, but complete installation and operation was not in effect until May 2023. The first power production from Hywind Tampen started in November 2022, and was delivered to Gullfaks A Platform. The windfarm was then connected to the Snorre platforms in May 2023, and officially opened in August 2023. Supply chain issues around steel for the tower sections delayed the final four turbines, meaning they missed the weather window and had to be delayed until spring.

Hywind Tampen has an expected economic lifetime of 19 years, bounded by the respective lifetime of Snorre and Gullfaks operations (Snorre until 2040, Gullfaks A until 2034 and B until 2030, and C until 2032). Hywind Tampen is therefore expected to be abandoned in 2041.

== Design ==
The offshore wind farm consists of 11 Siemens Games SG 8.0-167 DD turbines with a system capacity of 8 MW. Each wind turbine has three 81.5 m blades with 176 m diameter rotors. The turbines are installed on individual floating cylindrical spar buoy concrete structures that are linked together in a shared anchoring system. The anchors are fixed on the ocean floor at a depth of 260–300 meters.

At such water depths, it is not possible to install bottom-fixed solutions, which are the more cost-efficient solution. However, 80% of global offshore wind resources are found in deeper waters (past 60m), and the wind is generally stronger and more consistent. Installation of floating turbines therefore requires a large technical expertise and investments, but the wind farm has greater potential for electricity generation. Equinor intends to expand their offshore wind capacity while reducing cost, and their main strategy for doing so is to invest in technological improvements and large-scale building projects.

The concrete foundations are 107 metres (351 ft) tall, with the lower 66 m (217 ft) being 18 m (59 ft) diameter, and the top section reducing in diameter to 8 m (26 ft). They were constructed using a slip forming method by Aker Solutions, who merged with Kværner in 2020. The bottom 20 metres (66 ft) was constructed in a dry dock in Stord, before being towed to the Vindafjord where the remainder was built and the mechanical outfitting completed.

The turbines are moored to the seabed using anchors and mooring lines and are held afloat both by tension in the mooring system and buoyancy from gravity. The blade movement is regulated through turbine motion controllers, intended to maximize electricity generation, and reduce strain on the tower from corrosion and rough weather.

The turbines are inter-connected in a loop via a string of eleven 2.5 km (1.6 mi) long dynamic cables, with a 630 mm^{2} (0.98 sq in) cross-section. There are also two export cables that transport the electricity to the Gullfaks-A and Snorre-A Platforms, at 16 km (9.9 mi) and 12.9 km (8.0 mi) respectively. The cables are rated at 66 kV, and were produced by JDR Cable Systems in Hartlepool, although the cores were manufactured by parent company TFKable in Bydgoszcz, Poland. The cables lack the capacity to export all the electricity produced by Hywind Tampen when running at full capacity.

Hywind Tampen is a largely unmanned wind farm, with an onshore control room in Bergen, on the western coast of Norway.

== Contributing parties ==
=== Funding ===
The final investment decision for the project came in October 2019, with contracts worth NOK 3.3 billion. Equinor received NOK 2,329.8 million (approx. $341m USD) in public funding from Enova; a green investment body owned by the Norwegian Ministry of Climate and Environment. Preceding Enova's investment, the project also received a NOK 566 million investment grant from the Norwegian business sector's NOx Fund. Further investment was primarily made by the Snorre and Gullfaks partners: Equinor Energy, Petoro AS, OMV (Norge) AS, ExxonMobil Exploration and Production Norway AS, Idemitsu Petroleum Norge AS, DEA Norge AS and Vår Energi AS.

=== Provisions of parts and installation ===
Hywind Tampen has awarded a broad series of multinational companies (mostly based in Europe) for the provision of parts and installation of the wind park. DEME Offshore participated in the front-end engineering and design of the windmill structures. Siemens Gamesa was awarded the turbine supply contract and a 5-year maintenance contract for delivering, machine rooms, blades, and towers; seven of which were delivered as planned and in operation in the last quarter of 2022, while the production of the last four lagged behind due to a steel shortage as a result of the war in Ukraine. Their installation was further stalled until the spring of 2023 in anticipation of a manageable weather window. Kværner ASA received the design, construction, and installation contract for the floating substructures. JDR Cable System was awarded the manufacturing contract for the inner array cable network and export cables, with power cores provide by TFKable. Seaway 7 was awarded the contract for their installation. The final array cables were installed by Ocean Installer.

== Political support ==
=== Support from the Norwegian Government ===
Based on annual revenues from 2018, Equinor was the world's seventh largest transnational corporation in the core industries of the ocean economy, which can be attributed to their oil and gas extraction. Although directly benefitting from oil and gas, the Norwegian government has in recent years focused on developing a large-scale growth of green industries, both as a response to climate change and biodiversity loss and to get a first mover advantage within green industries. Their strategy and focal points can be found in the government's roadmap for green industrial growth. One of its key goals is to make Norway a competitive and leading nation in offshore wind. The oil and gas sector is responsible for approx. ¼ of Norway's total greenhouse gas emissions (equivalent to 12.2 mill. tons of CO_{2}). The development of the industry and offshore wind technology is therefore the primary initial strategy of the roadmap. Their ambition is to delegate offshore wind areas with the potential of 30 GW production capacity, which is approx. 75% of the current Norwegian energy system capacity. They also highly encourage local supply chain development.

Equinor is a state-owned company, so their practices are obligated to be in line with national strategies and policy. Enova's financial support should therefore not as come as a surprise. Hywind Tampen is expected to contribute to 200,000 CO_{2} and 1,000 NOx yearly emission offsets through reductions in first scope emissions from Snorre and Gullfaks. In addition, the project will be used as a testbed to further develop turbines, installation methods, mooring, structures, integration systems etc. This could potentially reduce the cost of future offshore wind projects while creating new industrial opportunities and licences for Norwegian suppliers of offshore wind technologies. Offshore wind is expected to have a 50-fold growth by 2050.

=== ESA approval ===
The project has received broad political support, as clearly presented by Enova's NOK 2.3 billion funding. To approve state funding, the Norwegian Ministry of Trade had to notify the EFTA Surveillance Authority (ESA) to monitor compliance with the European Economic Area. Although Norway is not a member of the EU, they are a member of the EEA and bound by EFTA and ESA rules. The ESA found that Enova funding constituted state aid within art. 61(1) of the EEA Agreement, on the basis that it served to correct market failures.

=== Support from the EU ===
The EU Green Deal also lays the foundation for Norway to become a competitive actor in the global offshore wind market. The Norwegian governments expects the Green Deal to lay the foundations for the expansion of Norwegian offshore wind, insofar that EU member states will require a massive increase in their supply of renewable energy to meet their climate targets, and in parallel to increasing energy security. The EU developed a comprehensive offshore energy implementation strategy in 2021. It sets offshore renewable energy as a top EU priority; aiming to decarbonize electrical generation, hard-to-abate sectors, while simultaneously creating jobs and economic growth, and making the EU a global leader in clean technologies. They aim to create 300 GW of offshore wind installed capacity by 2050, which they suggest would require a massive growth of the industry (about 30x) and an estimated investment of EUR 800 billion. The success of the Norwegian industry can therefore significantly contribute to the EU's goal. Hywind Tampen involves a wide array of contracts for provisions of parts and installation. Their multinational supply chain, consisting largely of EU member state-based companies, could thereby have a positive effect on the development of offshore wind industries for both parties.

== Operational safety considerations ==
The operation of offshore floating wind farms raises a series of questions related to security and safety. Generally, safety concern factors relating to offshore wind farms are corrosion, fire, lightning strikes, blade failure, personal injury, ship collision and submarine cable damage. The most likely risk relating to the individual safety of Hywind Tampen's employees comes from are helicopter transportation between the installations and land. Extreme weather conditions could also pose a risk if employees present in, on or around the farm, but the digitalization of operations makes manual labour unnecessary under such circumstances.

=== Navigation concerns and conflicts ===
International navigation is in large part protected by the United Nations Convention on the Law of the Seas (UNCLOS), but the traffic around the Hywind Tampen area is in the Norwegian exclusive economic zone and overseen by the Norwegian Coastal administration. Offshore wind farms are known to create navigational conflicts, especially with the shipping industry, fisheries, and navies. Avinor finds no risk of collision with towers for aircraft, nor a need for rerouting. Conflicts mainly arise from an increased risk of collision and economic losses relating to rerouting and loss of fishing areas. The North Sea is an area of high traffic, but Equinor finds in their impact assessment of Hywind Tampen that the likelihood of collision is negligible; largely based on experiences from Snorre and Gullfaks. They find small consequences for the rerouting of navigation, particularly for fishing vessels.

The impact assessment acknowledges potential negative consequences for the commercial fishing and oil and gas industry. Hywind Tampen's 22.5 km^{2} (8.7 sq mi) anchoring system prohibits the use of bottom trawling equipment in this area. The system's chains can resist damage from trawling, but the trawling vessels equipment could suffer damage or loss of equipment. Hywind Tampen is therefore expected to have a certain impact on the trawling practice in the area, but alternative fishing techniques are unlikely to be affected. The anchoring system also limits expansion of the petroleum industry in the area as seismic studies and drilling could destabilize the wind turbines.

=== Environmental concerns ===
Hywind Tampen was accepted by Norwegian authorities partly to green the oil and gas sector. The park will have a positive effect on the reduction of greenhouse gasses from Snorre and Gullfaks, primarily CO_{2} and NOx from natural gas combustion electricity and to run the gas compressors. The reduction of carbon emissions has been a key driver of OFW technologies. However, offshore wind parks are also objects of environmental concern. The production offshore wind turbines require large quantities of raw materials, including rare metals. Their installation also contributes to substantial carbon emissions, and the disruption of marine ecosystems and migratory species movement. Furthermore, the maintenance of the turbines is assessed to emit 400,000 tons of CO_{2} over their entire lifespan, and the rerouting of navigation could potentially lead to longer sailing routes which requires more fuel. The decommissioning of wind turbines is perhaps under the most scrutiny. The wind turbines have a life expectancy of 25 years, and their methods of repurposing or disposal is yet to be decided. This hinges on the development of technology, which is currently limited.

Offshore wind parks also attract large scholarly attention regarding their effect on marine life. Interestingly, offshore wind farms can have a positive effect on marine life by acting as an artificial reef concentration nutrients and biodiversity, while also providing shelter from boats, predators, and fishermen. Equinor's impact assessment finds that the sea floor is uniform and lacks coral structures, and therefore argues that Hywind Tampen's artificial reef effect can be beneficial for biodiversity. An important contribution to the artificial reef effect is that sufficient light for plant growth only reaches 50m below the water surface in the North Sea, so the Hywind Tampen structures can contribute to the increase of phytoplankton and other key nutrients for marine life.

The North Sea is a rich area of biodiversity and biological production of birds, fish and marine mammals. Equinor was required to present an elaborate assessment on Hywind Tampen's potential effect on marine life. Their assessment reveals that the most active bird species in the area are Northern Fulmar, Black-Legged Kittiwake, and several species of seagulls and suggest that the wind turbines will have a minimal effect on such seabirds. Hywind Tampen could pose a risk for collision, create interferences, habitat change, and loss, and create a barrier for navigation. The wind farm could affect marine mammals through noise pollution from the wind turbines and anchoring chains, e.g., by interfering with the echolocation of whales. However, Equinor claims that the frequency and range of such noise is unlikely to affect mammals. The North Sea is home to a large diversity of fish species. The most common species in the area around Hywind Tampen are cod, haddock, saithe, and Norwegian pout, and Equinor's own assessment yet again finds little effect on fish population except for some spawning interferences during implementation.

== Security risks ==
=== National security considerations ===
The Norwegian Water Resources and Energy Directorate (NVE) is responsible for coordinating emergency preparedness planning and established the Power Supply Preparedness Organization (KBO) to monitor energy security risks. As a result of an increased global weaponization of energy, particularly emphasized after the attack on the North Stream pipeline, Norway, the EU, and NATO have set an increased focus on the protection, resilience and security surrounding critical infrastructure, and in turn critical marine infrastructure. Whether Hywind Tampen can be considered critical infrastructure is debatable, but it certainly involves in critical processes both directly and indirectly, through connections to submarine cables and pipelines, communication networks and energy provision. Sabotage and disruption could therefore have significant socio-economic effects, especially in terms of financial losses and social trust.

The updated European Union's Maritime Security Strategy calls for a higher level of cooperation across member states on issues of critical marine infrastructure protection. The EU is also becoming more tightly involved with NATO and the two parties launched a joint military action force to protect critical infrastructure and reinforce common security in January 2023. This task force plays an important and increasing part in the surveillance of Norwegian waters, and NATO presence around platforms and installations in the North Sea is intended to evade attacks on critical infrastructure.

As a result of Russia's invasion of Ukraine, the EU has rapidly phased out their supply of Russian gas. The importance of renewable energy and the export of Norwegian natural gas has therefore become crucial for the EU and NATO's energy security, in addition to security and risk management. Norway is now the EU's largest provider of natural gas, and green industrial growth could make Norway a central supplier of renewable energy. Hywind Tampen's contribution to the Norwegian oil and gas sector could in fact have a direct positive effect on EU energy security. Norwegian energy access and reliability is extremely high, and 96% of national electricity use (in 2015) is produced in local hydropower plants. Most production of natural gas is therefore exported, and a higher influx of greener supply is beneficial to the EU's Green strategy. The testbed qualities of Hywind Tampen should therefore seemingly be encouraged by the EU and the Norwegian state.

=== Sabotage and surveillance ===
The Norwegian National Security Authority (NSM) asserts that Norway's national security is less stable than before and will likely become more acute with time. The increasing threat is largely attributed to a broader array of interests and actors, who make use of a wider portfolio of disruptive means for sabotage, espionage, and the mapping of critical infrastructure. On these grounds, the Norwegian Defence as heightened their focus on the resilience and protection of critical marine infrastructure. The Nordic national broadcasting channels have collectively uncovered an increased, prolonged and suspicious activity of Russian ships in the proximity of offshore wind farms and important submarine cable junctures, often ahead of disruptions. The NSM asserts that submarine infrastructure is especially vulnerable to sabotage, and the thousands of kilometres of gas pipeline off the Norwegian coast is impossible to fully monitor. In recent years two submarine cables have been damaged with unknown causes, where in one case 4,2 km of cables disappeared without a trace outside of Vesterålen in 2021. Hywind Tampen may be comforted by their spatial proximity to the largest naval base in the Nordic region, Haakonsvern in Bergen, and a relatively large distance to the Russian boarder.

=== Cyber security ===
Cyber attacks could pose a threat to the operations of Hywind Tampen as large parts of operations are controlled from an onshore control room in Bergen. Dependence on computational systems could expose a series of vulnerabilities. Offshore wind farms are generally dependent on digital processing and communication technologies, e.g., long globe-encircling, ICS-specific and hyper local satellite communications and especially the internet. All communication across the Hywind Tampen installations, to the control room and to other vessels will be done through wireless communication. Vulnerabilities in software could therefore lead to accidental or intentional communication interferences between various links. This could for example be tampering with the turbine motion controllers leading to material damage and halts in electricity generation. Hywind Tampen's breadth of suppliers could also be a potential source of vulnerability in their cyber security. The breadth of external parties involved in the park's value chain could potentially be a risk factor of leakage of vital information, like vulnerabilities in the cable system or turbines. Most suppliers are however European based companies, which one could assume pursue the same political interests. Suppliers may on the other hand have access to valuable technological insight in Hywind technology which could be in the interest of competitors to get a hold of.

=== Smuggling ===
Offshore wind farms, especially unmanned installations, have been an area of interest for anti-smuggling authorities and research. Offshore wind turbines could facilitate smuggling activities by acting as a remote and uncontrolled drop-off point for illegal cargo. Suppliers can simply connect the cargo to the floating structures and leave it there for pick up. International trade routes frequently pass in the vicinity of Hywind Tampen, so smugglers can easily avoid suspicion when being in close range. The wind turbines are intended to mostly be unmanned and therefore serve as a discrete intersection. Hywind Tampen could alternatively serve as a useful base of state and NATO surveillance. Surveillance footage and AIS tracking could uncover illegal actions, such as smuggling, pollution, and unauthorized fishing in protected areas. At the time being, there is no available information on the surveillance capabilities or functions of Hywind Tampen.
