= Harald Bekken =

Norwegian politician (born 1942)

Harald Bekken (born 4 August 1942) is a Norwegian priest and politician for the Labour Party.

He grew up in Nesodden Municipality. After graduating with the cand.theol. degree, he was ordained in Nesodden Church in 1970 by bishop Per Lønning.

In his early career he was a priest in the King's Guard, for the youth in Bøler Church and worked at the Seaman's Church in Haifa. After a period as chaplain in the Diocese of Nord-Hålogaland, he served as vicar in Vålerenga Church, Gamlebyen Church, and in Oslo Prison.

He was active in the Labour Party in Tromsø Municipality, and remained so after moving back south. From 1986 to 1987 he was a member of Brundtland's Second Cabinet as a State Secretary in the Ministry of Church and Education. He was elected as a deputy representative to the Parliament of Norway from Oslo for the term 1989–1993. He only met during 1 day of parliamentary session. He was city commissioner for culture and urban development in Rune Gerhardsen's city government in Oslo.

Bekken also served as leader of YNCA/YWCA in Norway as well as Kristne Arbeidere.

Political offices
| Preceded by Terje Kalheim | Oslo City Commissioner of Culture and Urban Development; 1995–1997 | Succeeded by Olaf Stene |
