= Green Volt offshore wind farm =

Proposed floating wind farm off north-east Scotland

Green Volt
- Country: Scotland, United Kingdom
- Location: North-east of Aberdeen
- Coordinates: 57°33′06″N 1°36′03″W
- Status: Proposed
- Commission date: Expected 2029
- Owners: Floatation Energy (50%); Vårgrønn (50%)
- Operator: Green Volt Offshore Wind Farm Ltd.

Wind farm
- Type: Offshore

Power generation
- Units planned: 35 x 16 MW
- Nameplate capacity: 560 MW (proposed)

External links
- Website: https://greenvoltoffshorewind.com/

Green Volt is a proposed offshore wind farm in the North Sea located about 80 kilometres (50 mi) off the East Coast of Scotland, which will use floating turbines. When consented in April 2024, it was the world's largest floating offshore wind farm at 560 MW from 35 turbines each rated at 16 MW. It is described as "Europe’s first commercial scale floating offshore wind farm". As of August 2025 its future is problematic as the cabling costs to shore increase, and islanded oil platforms (which are usually powered by diesel) have problems switching to unreliable renewable energy.

If operational in 2029 the farm may provide power to the National Grid and to nearby oil and gas platforms. The project was one of 13 projects awarded exclusivity agreements for seabed lease from Crown Estate Scotland in March 2023 as part of the Innovation and Targeted Oil and Gas leasing round (INTOG).

The wind farm will be located north-east of Aberdeen, on the site of the decommissioned Ettrick and Blackbird oil fields.

The project is expected to cost around £2.5bn, and create 2800 jobs during its construction.

Green Volt Offshore Wind Farm Ltd. is equally co-owned by Flotation Energy and Vårgrønn, a joint-venture between Plenitude (Eni) and HitecVision.

A scoping request for the environmental impact assessment (EIA) was made to Marine Scotland by Flotation Energy and CNOOC Petroleum Europe in November 2021. The EIA was then submitted in February 2023, and the Section 36 consent was granted on 19 April 2024. All of the necessary planning approvals were secured by April 2024.

In September 2024, the first phase of the project was awarded Contracts for Difference for 400 MW at £139.93/MWh (2012 prices), as part of the sixth Allocation Round.
