= Terje Kalheim =

Norwegian politician (born 1952)

Terje Kalheim (born 21 September 1952) is a Norwegian trade unionist and politician for the Socialist Left and Labour parties.

He grew up in Bøler, Oslo as a son of trade unionist Ragnar Kalheim. Terje Kalheim attended Sogn Vocational School and became a carpenter, eventually being hired in Oslo Sporveier. Here, he became the leader of the trade union. Kalheim was also deputy leader of the organization against Norwegian EU membership, Nei til EF, until 1991.

In 1991 he became City Commissioner (byråd) of Culture in the city government of Oslo, sitting until 1995 when he was not re-nominated for the 1995 Norwegian local elections. The reason was his change of heart in the EU membership question, relinquishing his opposition . In 1996 Kalheim and fellow former city commissioner Raymond Johansen both left the Socialist Left Party and joined the Labour Party. Kalheim was employed by the Norwegian Confederation of Trade Unions.

Political offices
Preceded by Sveinung Lunde	Oslo City Commissioner of Culture; 1991–1995	Succeeded by Harald Bekken
