= Gullfaks oil field =

Oil and gas field in the North Sea

Gullfaks
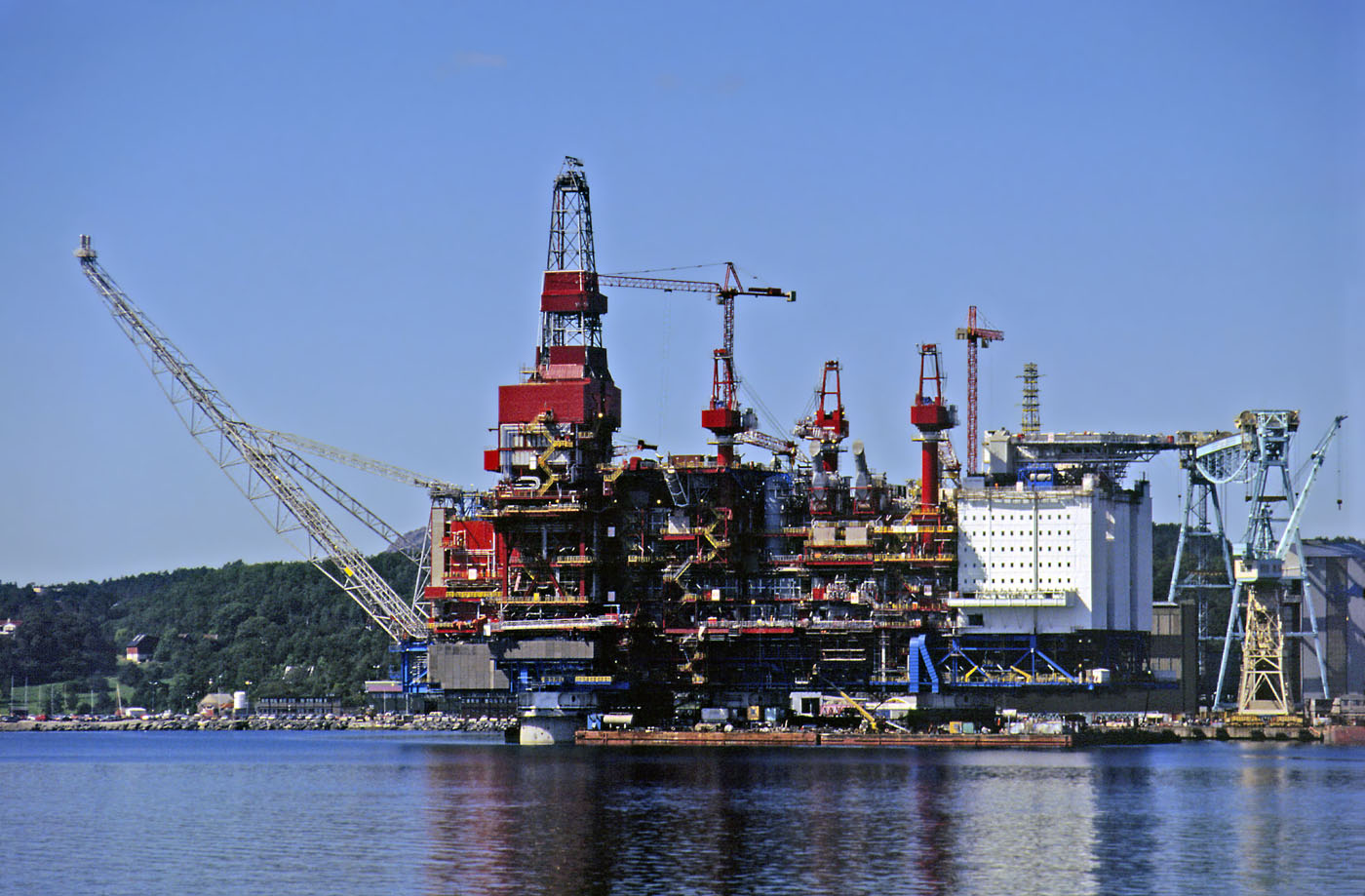
- Gullfaks A being completed in Stord

- Location within North Sea
- Country: Norway
- Location: North Sea
- Block: 34/10
- Offshore/onshore: offshore
- Coordinates: 61°12′54″N 2°16′48″E
- Operator: Equinor
- Partners: Petoro

Field history
- Discovery: 1978
- Start of production: 1986
- Peak of production: 180,000 barrels per day (29,000 m^{3}/d)
- Peak year: 2001

Production
- Current production of oil: 39,000 barrels per day (~1.9×10^{6} t/a)
- Year of current production of oil: 2013
- Estimated oil in place: 73 million barrels (~1.0×10^{7} t)

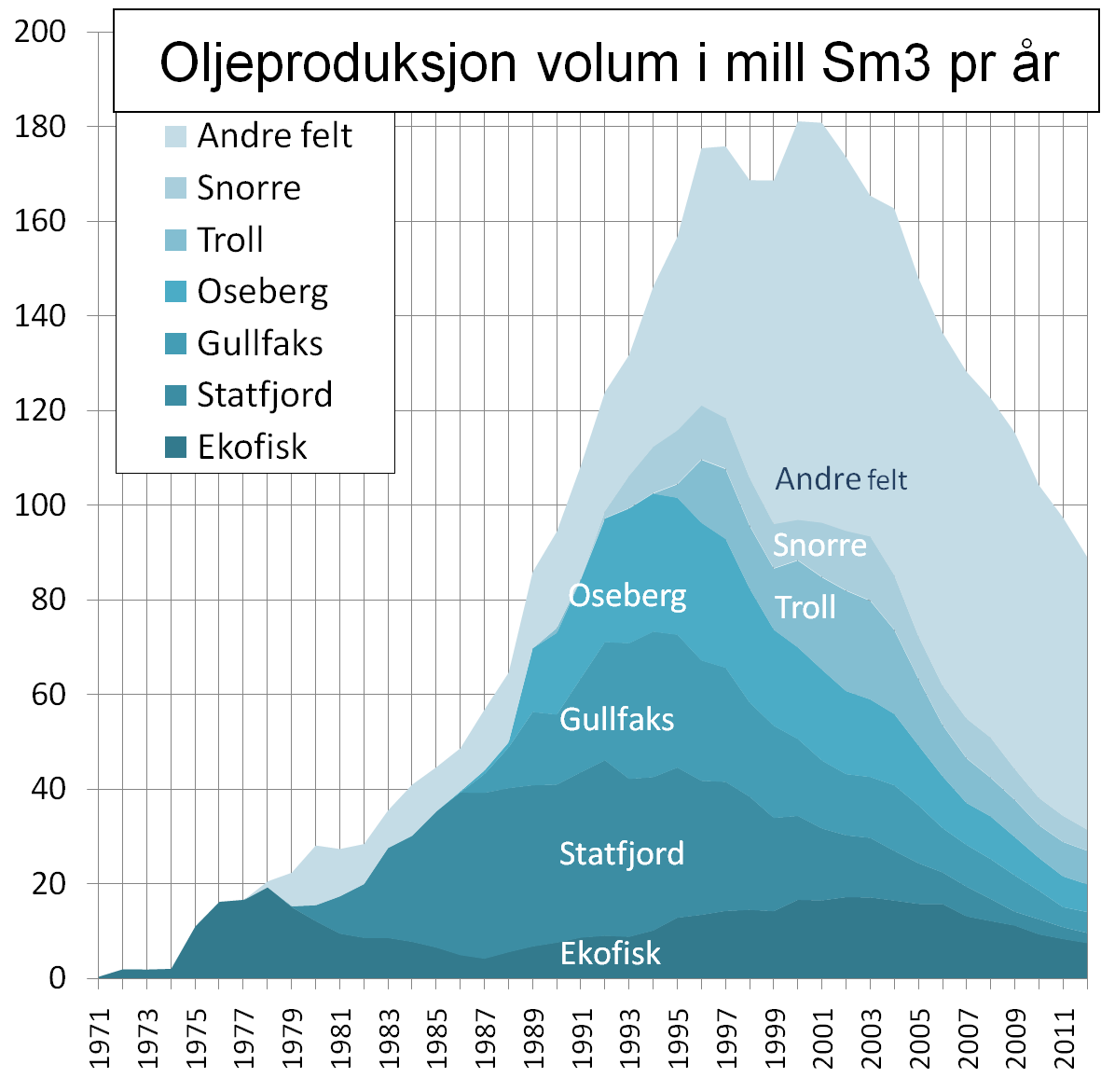
Petroleum production of Norway by year and oil field

Gullfaks is an oil and gas field in the Norwegian sector of the North Sea operated by Equinor. It was discovered in 1978, in block 34/10, at a water depth of 130-230 meters. The initial recoverable reserve is 2.1 billion barrels (330×10^{6} m^{3}), and the remaining recoverable reserve in 2004 is 234 million barrels (37.2×10^{6} m^{3}). This oil field reached peak production in 2001 at 180,000 barrels per day (29,000 m^{3}/d). It has satellite fields Gullfaks South, Rimfaks, Skinfaks and Gullveig.

In November 2022, the Hywind Tampen floating offshore wind farm started supplying power to the Gullfaks platforms.

== Platforms ==
The project consists of three production platforms Gullfaks A (1986), Gullfaks B (1988), and Gullfaks C (1989). Gullfaks C sits 217 metres (712 ft) below the waterline and the height of the total structure measured from the sea floor is 380 metres (1,250 ft), making it taller than the Eiffel Tower. Gullfaks C holds the record of the heaviest object that has ever been moved to another position, relative to the surface of the Earth with a total displacement between 1.4 and 1.5 million tons. The platform produces 250,000 barrels per day (40,000 m^{3}/d) of oil. The Tordis field, which is located 11 kilometres (6.8 mi) southeast of Gullfaks C, has a subsea separation manifold installed in 2007 which is tied-back to the existing Gullfaks infrastructure.

Gullfaks platform design data
Installation	Gullfaks A	Gullfaks B	Gullfaks C
Type	Concrete gravity platform	Concrete gravity platform	Concrete gravity platform
Function	Drilling, production, storage, accommodation	Drilling, production, accommodation	Drilling, production, accommodation
Location	SW part of field	NW part of field	
Water depth, metres	135	142	216
Fabrication substructure	Norwegian Contractors Stavanger	Norwegian Contractors Stavanger	Norwegian Contractors Stavanger
Topsides design	Aker Engineering and Foster Wheeler	Aker Engineering and Foster Wheeler	
Substructure weight, tonnes	340,000	173,000	370,000
Topside weight, tonnes	40,000	25,000	49,000
Accommodation (crew)	330	160	300
Legs	4	3	4
Cells	24	19	24
Storage capacity, barrels	180,000	Nil	
Well slots	42	42	
Wells	21 production, 17 injection	20 production, 13 injection	
Throughput oil, barrels per day (bpd)	245,000	150,000	
Water injection, bpd	4 x 95,000	95,000	
Platform installed	1986	1987	May 1989
Production start	1987	1988	January 1990
Oil production to	2 x SPM buoys (8,400 m^{3}/hour)	Gullfaks A	
Gas production to	Statfjord C	Statfjord C	

== Incidents ==
Between November 2009 and May 2010 a well being drilled from Gullfaks C experienced multiple well control incidents which were investigated by Petroleum Safety Authority Norway and summarized in a report released on 19 November 2010. The report stated that only chance prevented the final and most serious incident on 19 May 2010 from becoming a full-scale disaster. The report also questioned why the Statoil’s probe that was supposed to assess which barriers functioned "and thereby helped to prevent or limit the hazard" did not seem to have been assessed.

On 29, April 2016, a helicopter carrying oil workers crashed while flying from the Gullfaks oil field to Bergen. All 13 people on board were killed.

== Geology ==
The reservoir consists of delta sandstones from the Middle Jurassic Brent Group, shallow-marine Lower Jurassic Cook Formation sandstones, and the fluvial-channel and delta-plain Lower Jurassic Statfjord Formation.

== See also ==
- 2016 Turøy helicopter crash
- List of tallest oil platforms
