= Snorre oil field =

Norwegian oil field in the North Sea

Snorre field
- Location within North Sea
- Country: Norway
- Region: Northern North Sea
- Location: Tampen area
- Blocks: 34/4 and 34/7
- Offshore/onshore: offshore
- Coordinates: 61°31′31.58″N 2°12′41.42″E
- Operator: Statoil

Field history
- Start of production: August 1992
- Abandonment: 2040 (est)

Production
- Estimated oil in place: 1,400 million barrels (~1.9×10^{8} t)
- Estimated gas in place: 6×10^{9} m^{3} (210×10^{9} cu ft)

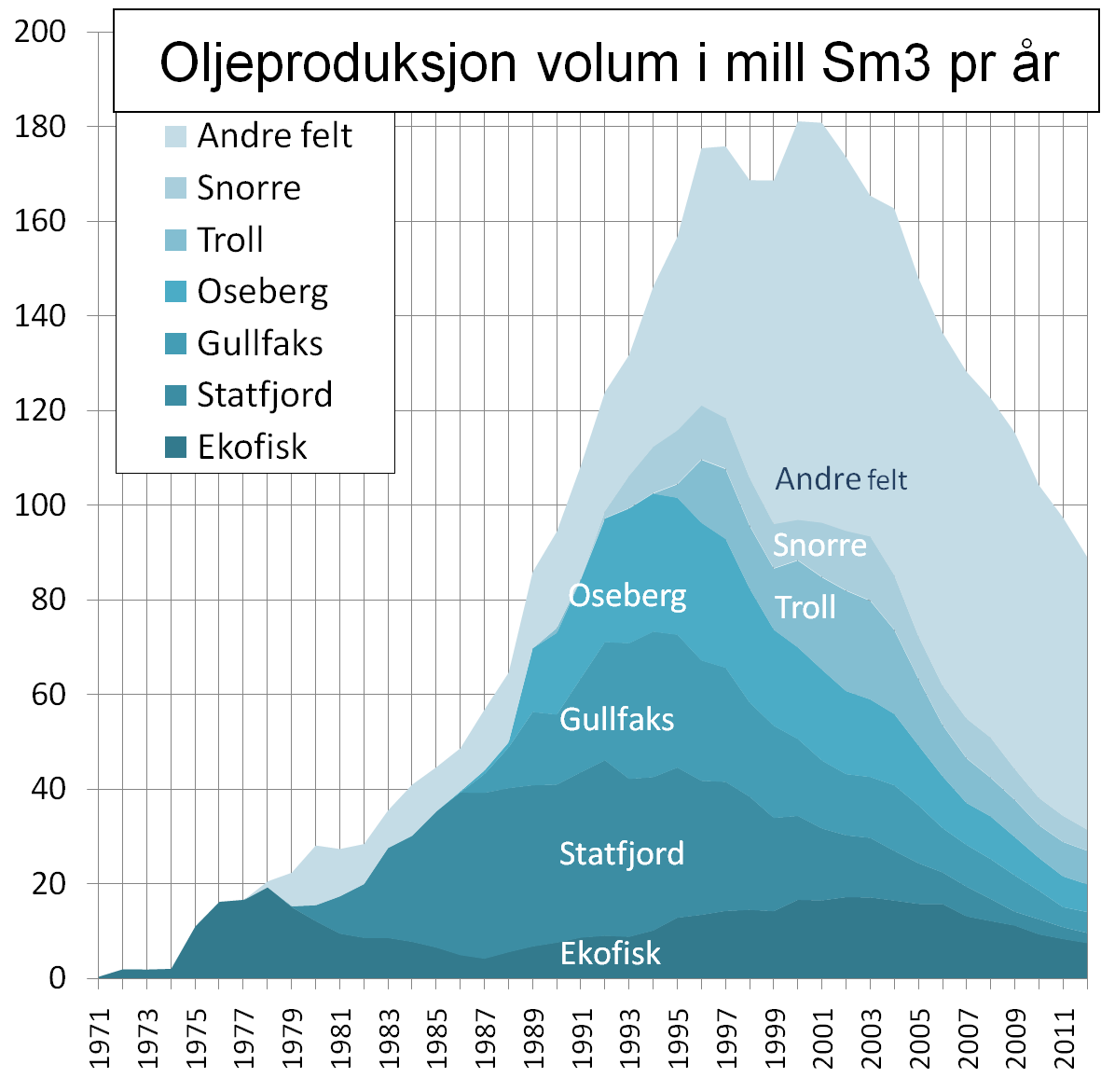
Petroleum production of Norway by year and oil field

Snorre is an oil and gas field in the Tampen area in the southern part of the Norwegian Sea. The sea depth in the area is 300 to 350 metres (980 to 1,150 ft). Snorre has been operational since August 1992. It was the first field developed by Saga Petroleum.

A Plateosaurus knucklebone, specimen PMO 207.207, was discovered in 1997 at 2,256 metres (7,402 ft) while drilling the Snorre oil field.

In May 2023, the Hywind Tampen floating offshore wind farm started supplying power to the Snorre platform.

== Production ==
Snorre A platform in the south is a floating steel facility for accommodation, drilling and processing. Snorre A has also a separate process module for production from the Vigdis field. A subsea template with ten well slots, Snorre UPA, is located centrally in the field and connected to Snorre A. Oil and gas from Snorre A is piped to the nearby Statfjord A platform for final processing.

Snorre B platform is located in the northern part of the field and is a semi-submersible integrated drilling, processing and accommodation steel facility. Oil from Snorre B is piped 45 km to Statfjord B platform for storage and export.

The Snorre field is operated by Statoil. In 2009, Statoil started a project to upgrade the offshore production complex. The Norwegian Petroleum Directorate is requesting Statoil to build a new platform at the field.

On 12 December 2020, the Snorre Expansion Project in the North Sea started production. The major Increased Oil Recovery project was to add nearly 200 million barrels of recoverable oil reserves besides extending the Snorre field's productive life through 2040.

Multiple efforts to enhance oil recovery over several years make Snorre perhaps the largest improved oil recovery project on the Norwegian shelf.

== Reserves ==
The reserves consist of 1.6 billion barrels (250×10^{6} m^{3}) of oil, 6.7 billion cubic metres (240×10^{9} cu ft) of natural gas, and 4.8 million tons of natural gas liquids.
