= Befalsskolen for Infanteriet i Sør-Norge =

Training school for officers

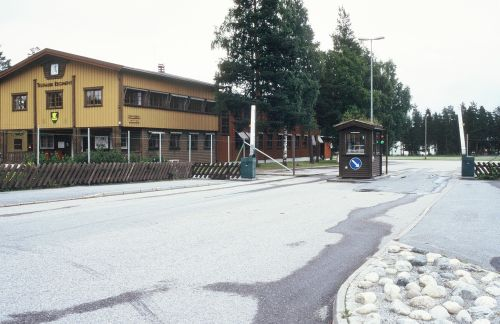
Main gate at Heistadmoen.

Befalsskolen for Infanteriet i Sør-Norge (BSIS) (59°35′49″N 9°39′52″E) was a Norwegian infantry officer training school, in operation between 1945 and 1994.

== History ==
BSIS was established by royal resolution in the autumn of 1945 to serve as the new infantry officer training school in the south of Norway. The new government formed by Einar Gerhardsen on 25 June 1945 had immediately initiated a comprehensive review of Norway's military capability after the end of hostilities with Germany on 8 May 1945. BSIS was established in order to complement Befalsskolen for Infanteriet i Trøndelag (BSIT), established 1804, and Befalsskolen for Infanteriet i Nord-Norge (BSIN), established in 1899, and would form the new backbone of army officer training in southern Norway.

The school was located at Heistadmoen infantry base outside Kongsberg, which had been the home of Telemark Infantry Regiment since 1909 and had been expanded by the German occupation forces during the war years between 1940 and 1945. The landscape around Heistadmoen was ideal for infantry training with large surrounding forests and hilly terrain. The inland climate at Heistadmoen, ranging from −30 °C in winter to 30 °C in summer, was also ideal for infantry training in harsh weather conditions.

During the 1950s and 1960s BSIS grew to become the largest officer training facility in Norway. A large weapons testing and training area was built in the Hengsvatn region near the base which was also used by other branches of the armed forces. The school educated approximately 12,700 sergeants for service in the army between establishment in 1945 and disbandment in 1994.

== Heistadmoen after BSIS ==
BSIS was disbanded in June 1994 in connection with Heistadmoen infantry base becoming the training base of Norway's contingent in NATO's Immediate Reaction Force (IRF). In August 2001, Telemark Infantry Battalion was moved to Rena base in Hedmark, which was also home of the cavalry and airborne forces in the south of Norway. In January 2003, Telemark Infantry Regiment was disbanded having existed at various locations since the formation of the Norwegian army in 1628 and at Heistadmoen since 1909.

Heistadmoen is today under administration by the Norwegian Home Guard and activity is much reduced from the 1990s with part of the base area redeveloped for civilian use.

== Literature ==
- Sigurd Friis og Magnar Saltnes: Befalsskolen for Infanteriet, 2003
