= Ragnar Kalheim =

Norwegian trade unionist and politician

Ragnar Toralf Kalheim (22 December 1926 – 26 May 1974) was a Norwegian trade unionist and politician for the Socialist Electoral League.

== Early and personal life ==
Born Ragnar Toralf Edh in Nesbyen to laborer Yngvar Reinholdt Edh (1901–1975) and Josefine Alette Kalheim (1905–1996), the family lived several places, and moved to Tønsberg in the interwar period. Here, Kalheim was a member of Milorg during the occupation of Norway by Nazi Germany. He changed his last name from Edh to Kalheim in 1946. In December 1950, he married Anne Grethe Thorsen.

== Politics and trade unionism ==
In 1945, when the Second World War was over, Kalheim openly joined the communist movement. From 1946 he chaired the Young Communist League of Norway chapter in Tønsberg, and from 1949 he was a secretary in the Young Communist League nationally. However, following the Peder Furubotn controversy in 1949 and 1950, in which Kalheim sided with Furubotn, he was excluded from the party.

He instead concentrated more on his trade union activity. Since 1949 he worked in Akers Mekaniske Verksted. In 1957 he became a board member in the Norwegian Union of Iron and Metalworkers. He chaired the local chapter Oslo Jern og Metall from 1973. He was also active in the movement against nuclear arms and against European Economic Community. In 1972 he was a member of the popular movement Folkebevegelsen mot EF, which worked, successfully, to prevent Norwegian membership in the European Communities.

He was a member of the Labour Party from 1959 to, but partly since the Labour Party was a strong advocate for European Communities membership, he left the party in 1973. He was instead one of the main architects behind the new Socialist Electoral League, and was elected as a deputy representative to the Parliament of Norway from Oslo during the term 1973–1977. However, he died shortly into the term, in May 1974 in Oslo. He had struggled with heart problems for a while. A square at Aker Brygge, near the old Akers Mekaniske Verksted factory, was named Ragnar Kalheims plass after him.
