= Human factors in diving safety =

Human factors are the physical or cognitive properties of individuals, or social behavior which is specific to humans, and which influence functioning of technological systems as well as human-environment equilibria. The safety of underwater diving operations can be improved by reducing the frequency of human error and the consequences when it does occur. Human error can be defined as an individual's deviation from acceptable or desirable practice which culminates in undesirable or unexpected results. Human factors include both the non-technical skills that enhance safety and the non-technical factors that contribute to undesirable incidents that put the diver at risk.

[Safety is] An active, adaptive process which involves making sense of the task in the context of the environment to successfully achieve explicit and implied goals, with the expectation that no harm or damage will occur. – G. Lock, 2022

Dive safety is primarily a function of four factors: the environment, equipment, individual diver performance and dive team performance. The water is a harsh and alien environment which can impose severe physical and psychological stress on a diver. The remaining factors must be controlled and coordinated so the diver can overcome the stresses imposed by the underwater environment and work safely. Diving equipment is crucial because it provides life support to the diver, but the majority of dive accidents are caused by individual diver panic and an associated degradation of the individual diver's performance. – M.A. Blumenberg, 1996

Human error is inevitable and most errors are minor and do not cause significant harm, but others can have catastrophic consequences. Examples of human error leading to accidents are available in vast numbers, as it is the direct cause of 60% to 80% of all accidents. In a high risk environment, as is the case in diving, human error is more likely to have catastrophic consequences. A study by William P. Morgan indicates that over half of all divers in the survey had experienced panic underwater at some time during their diving career. These findings were independently corroborated by a survey that suggested 65% of recreational divers have panicked under water. Panic frequently leads to errors in a diver's judgment or performance, and may result in an accident. Human error and panic are considered to be the leading causes of dive accidents and fatalities.

Only 4.46% of the recreational diving fatalities in a 1997 study were attributable to a single contributory cause. The remaining fatalities probably arose as a result of a progressive sequence of events involving two or more procedural errors or equipment failures, and since procedural errors are generally avoidable by a well-trained, intelligent and alert diver, working in an organised structure, and not under excessive stress, it was concluded that the low accident rate in professional scuba diving is due to these factors. The study also concluded that it would be impossible to eliminate absolutely all minor contraindications for scuba diving, as this would result in overwhelming bureaucracy and would bring all diving to a halt.

Human factors engineering (HFE), also known as human factors and ergonomics, is the application of psychological and physiological principles to the engineering and design of equipment, procedures, processes, and systems. Primary goals of human factors engineering are to reduce human error, increase productivity and system availability, and enhance safety, health and comfort with a specific focus on the interaction between the human and equipment.

== Factors influencing the performance of a diving team ==
A diving team may be considered as a system which is influenced by equipment, environment, procedures, organisation, individuals, and interactions. There are considerations associated with each of these factors relating specifically to diving. The diving environment and equipment are external influences with which the diver interacts, and their effects are partly independent of human factors, but procedures, organisation and individuals are primarily human factors.

Humans function underwater by virtue of technology, as our physiology is poorly adapted to the environment. Human factors are significant in diving because of this harsh and alien environment, and because diver life support systems and other equipment that may be required to perform specific tasks depend on technology that is designed, operated and maintained by humans, and because human factors are cited as significant contributors to diving accidents in most accident investigations

Professional diving is a means to accomplish a wide range of activities underwater in a normally inaccessible and potentially hazardous environment. While working underwater, divers are subjected to high levels of physical and psychological stress due to environmental conditions and the limitations of the life support systems, as well as the rigours of the task at hand. Unmanned remotely operated underwater vehicles (ROUVs ot ROVs) and autonomous underwater vehicles (AUVs) allow performance of a variety of tasks at almost any depths for extended periods, but there are still many essential underwater tasks which can only be performed, or are most effectively performed, by a diver. A diver is still the most versatile underwater tool, but also the most unpredictable, and his own behaviour may threaten his safety.

Recreational, or sport divers, including technical divers, dive for entertainment, and are usually motivated by a desire to explore and witness, though there is no distinct division between the underwater activities of recreational and professional divers. The primary distinction is that legal obligations and protection are significantly different, and this is reflected in organisational structure and procedures.

Recreational diving has been rated more risky than snow skiing, but less risky than some other adventure sports such as rock climbing, bungee jumping, motorcycle racing and sky diving. Improvements in training standards and equipment design and configuration, and increased awareness of the risks of diving, have not eliminated fatal incidents, which occur every year in what is generally a reasonably safe recreational activity.

Both categories of diver are usually trained and certified, but recreational diving equipment is typically limited to self-contained underwater breathing apparatus (scuba), whereas professional divers may be trained to use a greater variety of diving systems, from scuba to surface-supplied mixed gas and saturation systems. A recreational diver may use some ancillary equipment to enhance the diving experience, but the professional will almost always use tools to perform a specific task.

Since the goal of recreational diving is personal enjoyment, a decision to abort a dive, for whatever reason, normally only affects the diver and his companions. A working diver faced with the same decision, must disappoint a client who needs and expects the diver's services, often with significant financial consequences. Therefore, the working diver often faces greater pressure to provide the service at the cost of reduced personal safety. Legal constraints are more necessary to protect the employee under these conditions, and are applied with variable levels of effectiveness. An understanding of the human factors associated with diving may help the diving team to strike an appropriate balance between service delivery and safety.

== Human factors ==
Human factors are the influences on human behavior, and the resulting effects of human performance on a process or system. Safety can be improved by reducing the frequency of human error and the consequences when it does occur. Human error can be defined as an individual's deviation from acceptable or desirable practice which culminates in undesirable or unexpected results.

Human factors engineering has also been defined as "the science of people at work". It is mainly concerned with understanding human capabilities, and applying that knowledge to the design of tools, equipment, systems, and processes. Input from various disciplines may be used and the field is considered a mix of engineering and psychology, with four main goals: enhancing safety, comfort and productivity, and reducing and managing errors. Human factors have also been equated to non-technical skills, the interpersonal skills, which include communication skills, leadership skills, team-work skills, decision-making skills, and situation-awareness skills.

Non-technical skills can be defined as "interpersonal skills which include: communication skills; leadership skills; team-work skills; decision-making skills; and situation-awareness skills." They do not include the technical skills required to get the job done. However, they complement these technical skills making them more efficient and effective:

Situation awareness is the continuous cycle of perception, comprehension, and prediction of the near future developing situation. It is a critical foundation for successful decision-making where conditions are evolving and there is little room for error. Attention is a limited resource and must be shared among the current situations, with due consideration of their importance. The part of the diver's attention focused on physical skills is high with new skills, but decreases with experience as the skills become internalised and more automatic, making more attention available for monitoring the environment and the dive, giving a broader awareness of the situation. Focus of attention may change with noticing a hazard, an interesting event, a need to make a decision, or a distraction, reducing the attention available for other matters. In some situations the combined attention of team members can significantly broaden the overall awareness of a team. Factors of delegated responsibility and team redundancy are relevant to achieving a good balance between excessive overlap and gaps in awareness.

Diver communications are a safety-critical skill for both professional and recreational divers, as a large number of emergency procedures depend on conveying the problem to the team member who is expected to help. Voice communications follow a specific protocol to minimise confusion, and recreational divers communicate mostly by hand signals, which must be intelligible to the dive buddy to avoid inappropriate response.

Communication between divers and between surface personnel and divers is imperfect at best, as a consequence of the physical characteristics of water. This prevents divers from performing at their full potential. Voice communication is the most generally useful format underwater, as visual forms are more affected by visibility, and written communication and signing are relatively slow and restricted by diving equipment.

Decision making is an essential component of diving operations from the dive planning stage through preparation, during the normal conduct of the dive, and particularly where contingencies, emergencies, and rescues may occur. Decisions are made based on information provided by communication and personal observation of the environment and developing situation.

- Leadership

Effective teamwork requires the members of the team to each be familiar with, and competent at, their allotted tasks, to communicate effectively with each other, and to be able to trust that the others will perform their tasks and communicate all necessary information at the appropriate times. In a commercial diving team this is facilitated by explicit and familiar job descriptions for each member, and the use of standard procedures, so that a team assembled from strangers can start work at a reasonable level of effectiveness.

== Effects of human factors on diving safety ==
Two ways of analysing the effects of human behaviour on safety are applied. One attempts to identify who was involved in a deviation from the recommended procedure, and the other attempts to identify why deviation from the recommended procedure seemed to be a good idea at the time. The first approach tends to apportion blame, on the assumption that the recommended procedure was, in fact, optimum, and the other aims to learn why the recommended procedure was not considered appropriate at the time. This second approach has been shown to be more productive of learning from the experience, but can only work within a just culture in which the people involved feel safe to discuss the details.

=== Categories of error ===
Reason categorizes how errors occur by analysing what causes a plan to fail.

- If a plan is good, but poorly executed, then failure is due to slips, lapses, trips or fumbles.
- If the plan itself is faulty, then failure is due to a mistake.
- If established or approved procedures or regulations are intentionally ignored, then a mistake can be categorised as a violation.

==== Levels of performance ====
These error categories relate to three levels of human performance:

- Skill-based: Routine, practiced tasks performed in a largely automatic fashion, with occasional conscious progress checks.
- Rule-based: If the automatic responses are unsuitable, a switch of level can be made where memorized performance patterns or rules are applied. These are structured on an If (situation), then do (actions) pattern, often similar to one from previous experience, and perceptions of the current situation are used to select an appropriate solution from memory. Potential solutions are developed through education, training, and experience, and are selected automatically from memory, but verified that they are appropriate by conscious thought.
- Knowledge-based: When solutions from memory do not suit the current situation, the fall back is to knowledge-based solutions, where the current situation must be analysed and a solution developed in real time. Performance is relatively slow and laborious and the process is subject to errors resulting from constraints of information, time, understanding, intelligence and distractions. During emergencies, well-reasoned responses are often substituted by inappropriate and unsuccessful reactions.

==== Error mechanisms ====
Three error mechanisms can be defined which correlate the error categories with human performance levels:

- Skill-based slips, lapses, and fumbles, where the plan is good but execution is not, due to inattention, distraction, confusion, or simply inadequate ability.
- Rule-based mistakes, where a good rule is misapplied, a bad rule applied, or there is a failure to apply a good rule.
- Knowledge-based mistakes, where a cognitive error is made in an attempt to analyse an unfamiliar problem.

==== Violations ====
Violations are a special category of mistakes where someone intentionally fails to apply a good rule, or deviates from acceptable or desirable practice.

Four categories of violations may be identified:

- Routine violations, which involve cutting corners, or taking short cuts, increasing risk for convenience or profit.
- Violations 'for kicks', where rules are broken to prove machismo or to alleviate boredom.
- Necessary violations, where the rules prevent people from performing a necessary task.
- Exceptional violations, which usually are the result of extreme emotions.

Age and gender are factors in the tendency to violate rules: Young men are more likely to violate rules than most older women, but men and women of all ages are similarly prone to error.

These error mechanisms explain the psychological basis for errors, but the mechanisms are not readily observable.

=== Stress ===
Stress has been defined as "the result of an imbalance between the demands placed upon an individual and the capacity of that individual to respond to the demands".

A person will respond to stress by taking actions to change the situation to reduce the stress. When the actions are successful the result is described as 'coping', when unsuccessful the level of stress will increase and may lead to panic.

The person exposed to a stressful situation (beyond skill based response), cognitively appraises the situation and compares it to previous experience using rule based or knowledge based assessment. The perception of stress is an individual reaction based on learned behaviour and available information and can vary dramatically between subjects. Perceived stress levels can in many cases be reduced by a reduction in uncertainty, which may result from education, training and experience, and a stressor which is perceived by one person as a threat, may be regarded as a challenge by someone else, or an inconvenience by a third person. These perceptions all evoke a response, but they indicate a very different level of tolerance and ability to cope with the situation.

Once stress is perceived, the person must decide how to respond to the stressor. The situation must be assessed, memory interrogated, options evaluated, and an appropriate response chosen.Ability to perform the chosen response may be affected by the stress situation, and once the response has been attempted, the subject will review how the response has affected the situation, and judge whether the response has been effective. Depending on the perceived residual stress, the process may be stopped or repeated indefinitely until the situation has been resolved, or the stress level increases until the subject is no longer able to cope.

==== Performance under stress ====
The level of perceived stress can affect performance. When there is little stress there is a tendency toward carelessness that may result in poor performance, but sufficiently high stress can overwhelm capacity and cause degraded performance due to inability to cope. Optimum performance occurs when the stress levels are less than the person's ability to respond, but sufficient to keep them alert. This varies with the individual and the situation, and can not be maintained continuously, but performance can be improved through personnel selection and training.

==== Training ====
The benefits of training may include an increase in performance at a given stress level and improvement of coping skills by developing response reactions to given stress situations. These are patterns of action which have been learned by experience, and can be applied to similar situations when the person operates on Reason's rule-based performance level, and reduce the need for a long and error prone cognitive process, thereby saving time, reducing stress and improving the ability to cope.

The objective of training should be to improve ability to continue the normal coping process when presented with unforeseen circumstances. A possible danger of training is over-reliance on learned procedures, as each stress situation is in some way unique and therefore no learned procedure will be a perfect match. The individual must retain the ability to assess whether the learned procedure is appropriate and adapt it to the specific situation. Therefore, training should include situational assessment and decision making under stress.

==== Coping ====
Appropriate stress response, or coping, is a cognitive process which evaluates a stress situation and the available options, then selects an appropriate course of action to respond. A diver needs to retain the ability to process information and make decisions while under stress, especially when confronted with unforeseen events. A sense of control and competence while under stress is crucial. An over-stressed person will tend to lose control and truncate the coping process, and become indecisive, losing the ability to analyze and act. As the situation overcomes the individual's ability to cope, panic sets in and creates a barrier in the stress response that blocks the decision process. A lack of action or continuation of an inappropriate action may lead to errors and accidents.

The diver's maxim, "stop, breathe, think, act", is a widely taught method for working through unexpected events underwater. The intention is to calm the diver and maintain an ability to cognitively appraise a stress situation.

1. Stop any action which may have created or is exacerbating the stress situation. This is intended to stabilise the situation sufficiently for the subsequent steps to be effective.
2. Focus on breathing effectively, concentrating on breathing rate and depth, and relaxing as much as possible. Experience shows that the majority of diver fatalities are due to drowning even though ample air was still available to the diver. This step should calm the diver's rising anxiety by showing that adequate life support is on hand, and counteract any carbon dioxide buildup that may be contributing to anxiety.
3. Think about the problem. Assess the situation and evaluate the options for resolving the imposed stress. At this stage the diver is probably operating in Reason's knowledge-based performance level where training and education can provide tools to help solve the problem.
4. Select a preferred option and act. This completes the stress response process. If the response has the desired effect, the situation should resolve, otherwise further thought and another response will be needed.

The dive maxim, "stop, breathe, think, act" is generally a good response, but it is not appropriate for all diving emergencies. This response assumes that both time and an adequate supply of breathing gas are available, and though this is often true, some situations require immediate learned responses which must be habituated by education, training and repetitive practice to overcome inappropriate instinctive and natural reflexive responses. For example, a diver should exhale while ascending to prevent lung overexpansion injuries, and if the diver is subject to a collision or sudden upwelling underwater, the natural reaction may be to tense up and hold his breath, particularly if the breathing gas supply is interrupted at the same time. This reaction could prove fatal if the diver is lifted sufficiently to cause lung overexpansion. Only through education training and practice, and perhaps proper selection, will the diver reflexively exhale as a response to a pressure reduction.

Other factors suggested by Bachrach to prevent panic are listed below:

1. Physical fitness: having a reserve capacity.
2. Training which emphasizes in-water skills and comfort
3. Medical examinations to ensure no hidden contraindications to diving
4. Fatigue prevention or avoidance
5. Age limits

==== Panic ====
The most frequently cited cause of diver injury or death is panic, or a loss of control Analysis of the human factors associated with diving can identify the primary influences which lead to panic, and suggest methods to promote safety.

Dive safety is primarily controlled by the individual diver and their ability to cope with stress underwater. The development of a diving accident may begin with a diver in a normal psychological and physiological state. The presence of a stressor may alter the diver's psychological and physiological state, and if the stress becomes excessive the diver's skills will diminish. Stressors may arise from human factors, the environment, equipment, procedures, organizational factors, or interactions between any of these, and these stress effects are cumulative.

A diver is normally able to cope with applied stressors and perform the dive safely, and while the diver has sufficient capacity for coping, the stress is relieved or controlled and the operation can continue, but if the stress exceeds the diver's capacity, then the stressor is beyond the diver's control and an accident may result.

When underwater, it is possible to see direct evidence of stress. A diver breathing rapidly produces more bubbles at closer intervals than a relaxed diver. If a diver's breathing is erratic, their ability to control their position in the water is often compromised, and their depth control may be reduced so that they move up and down and flail their limbs, or drift away from their appropriate depth without adjusting buoyancy to compensate.

Panic tends to occur when three elements are present: The diver is unprepared for the triggering situation, has difficulty with emotional regulation, and a stressor occurs. This model has been suggested as potentially useful for encouraging divers to identify and stay within the limits of their competence and to learn, practice, and refine the skills likely to be necessary for the dives they plan to undertake as a strategy to reduce the risk of panic in the event of any reasonably foreseeable contingency.

==== From errors to accidents ====
An accident is an unintended event leading to injury, occupational illness, death, or material loss or damage. A "near accident", "near miss" or "close call" is an event which had the potential to cause injury, occupational illness, death, or material loss or damage, but did not due to some corrective action.

Three critical stages can be identified in the development of an error into an accident:

- contributing events and conditions, which create the situation in which the error is possible, or increase the probability of it occurring.
- a direct cause: The action or lack of action which precedes and precipitates the error, and is an essential contribution to the commission of the error.
- compounding events and conditions, which alter the consequences of the error once it has occurred.

Equipment, procedures, organization, environment, individual factors and interactions between them are the sources of contributing and compounding events and conditions. Analysis of near accidents can be of great value to identify sources of error and allow planning to reduce or eliminate contributing and compounding conditions.

A safety study estimated about a million shortcuts taken per fatal accident.

The fatality is the peak of the accident pyramid. The base of the pyramid is the shortcuts, and in between are escalating levels of near-accidents which could (but too often do not) serve as lessons learned. Blumenberg, 1996.

Accident investigations typically focus on the end event, and attempt to erect barriers to similar accidents, such as personal protection equipment, backup equipment or alarm systems. These are intended to prevent the recurrence of similar accidents, and are often effective in this limited goal.

Accidents continue to occur because the majority of the contributing and compounding factors are not addressed. Human behavior and the systems in which people work are too complex to analyse all possible interactions. A more effective route to accident prevention is to reduce or mitigate the occurrence of human error by focusing on the contributing and compounding human factors that create an environment in which accidents are likely to occur.

==== Crisis management ====
Accidents frequently appear to happen unexpectedly because people failed to recognize the indications of developing crisis which resulted in the accident. A crisis can be defined as a rapidly developing sequence of events in which the risks associated with the system rapidly increase to a hazardous state. The interaction of system factors is complex and often unpredictable, and hazard can accumulate at a rate which varies depending on the system, until corrective action is taken, the hazard dissipates without intervention, or an accident occurs.

Although the individual operator is most often responsible for committing errors that cause accidents, it is also often the individual operator who is best placed to recognize the development of a dangerous situation and take corrective action, and this usually happens before the situation escalates into an accident.

The ability of the operator to recognize potentially dangerous situations can be improved by incorporating warning mechanisms into systems, and training can significantly improve their ability to recognize the development of a hazardous situation and take appropriate corrective action in time to return the system to an acceptable level of safety.

==== Equipment ====
Diving equipment can be grouped into four general categories:

- Life support equipment - the system that provides breathing gas to the diver.
- Safety and protective equipment.
- Equipment that helps the diver adapt to the underwater environment.
- Specialized tools for performing underwater work.

Manufacturers are continuously improving diving equipment to allow deeper, longer and safer diving operations, but the equipment still has ergonomic limitations and can exert significant stress on the diver:

- Regulators require increased breathing effort.
- Protective suits restrict mobility.
- Fins work muscles differently to walking or running, which are more natural activities for humans.
- Tools are often bulky, heavy, and physically difficult to move and operate underwater.

Proper ergonomic engineering can reduce the physical demands on the diver due to the equipment, but it is also important for equipment design to consider psychological aspects. Research by Morgan and others has shown that anxiety states may be a response to disordered breathing caused by use of breathing apparatus, and that some people experience respiratory distress or panic behaviour while doing physical exercise wearing scuba. Morgan has also recommended that more research be done on psychological aspects of human-respirator interface.

==== Procedures ====
Diving procedures are promulgated in many forms, including:

- Navy diving manuals, like the U.S. Navy Diving Manual and the Royal Navy Diving Manual
- Training and instructor reference manuals of the recreational diver certification agencies
- Government health and safety regulations
- Codes of practice published by government departments, IMCA and other associations of diving contractors, NOAA, AAUS, and other scientific diving institutions, cave diving organisations etc.
- Operations manuals of individual diving contractors.

Among the organisations publishing diving procedures, the US Navy, British Health and Safety Executive and NOAA are notable for funding published scientific research on diving safety.

Separate diving procedures are developed for each mode of diving, such as air and mixed gas diving, inshore and offshore diving, or recreational and professional diving. Decompression tables, programs and algorithms that prescribe depth and time limitations are also a subset of procedures, and highlight the unique nature of the hyperbaric work environment.

==== Environment ====
The underwater work environment exposes divers to physical, psychological and pathological stresses. No other industrial working environment alters normal worker physiology more than diving. Blumenberg, 1996.

Environmental influences include pressure, cold, currents, surge, and limited visibility, and underwater conditions can change rapidly, often without warning. Dive teams must anticipate environmental conditions and their effects, and plan accordingly. The diving environment cannot be controlled, but the diving team can control when and how the diver enters the underwater environment.

==== Individual ====
The dominant factor controlling diver safety is the individual diver's physical and mental fitness to dive, and physical and psychological evaluation of divers can improve dive safety.

Not everyone has the physical and mental capacity to dive safely. Professional diving can be physically demanding work, and some diving tasks require considerable strength and stamina, and a sufficient reserve of physical and psychological strength to cope with unexpected situations. The requirements for recreational diving may be less rigorous, but any diver, whether professional or recreational, should have some minimum capabilities in order to dive safely. Physical screening standards which take into account anticipated work demands are commonly used by commercial and military divers, and detailed lists of physical contraindications to diving have been published. These standards can vary widely, but the need for physical screening is generally accepted.

Behavioral problems may be more important than physical problems because 'no amount of physical screening can protect a diver from his own stupidity' and 'the majority of diving accidents are caused by poor judgment or inattention to the basic rules of diving safety... ' Mental fitness may be at least as important as physical fitness for divers, and maturity and responsibility should be evaluated as carefully as physical health and fitness.

Selection of divers should match the individual's mental and physical abilities to job demands, but although research has successfully developed a unique psychological profile for divers, psychological screening is seldom applied. According to Morgan, divers are "characterized by low scores for measures of anxiety, and high scores for measures of aggression, assertiveness, confidence and sensation-seeking; they also tend to possess an internal locus of control." Morgan has also successfully used Spielberger's State-Trait Anxiety Inventory to predict with 88% accuracy which divers amongst a class of new recreational divers would experience panic.

==== Organization ====
The organizational factor is the dominant controllable factor affecting behavior of the individual diver. The organization can be analysed at several levels ranging from a two-man buddy team through the dive team, the whole organization and up to the whole diving industry, and all organizational levels influence the individual diver's behavior and performance.

==== Interactions ====
Interactions between the other factors is the most unpredictable factor. Some interactions are linear and relatively easily predicted, but others are complex. Unanticipated interactions between factors can be critical when a diver is working in an isolated hyperbaric environment. Thorough planning and preparation can help to minimize unanticipated interactions, and effective coping skills may be necessary to control interactions when they occur.

== Why accidents happen ==
The simplistic statement that most diving accidents are due to diver error does not address the underlying reasons for the diver making the mistake. Errors are inherent in human nature, and it is more useful to consider all levels of influence on the behaviour of the diver as this may throw light on the reasons why the same errors are repeated so often.

Analyses of aviation accidents show that 60 to 80% of aviation accidents are at least partly due to human error. The techniques of Human Factor Error Analysis can be applied to diving at all levels of the industry and sport, and can provide insight into why incidents occur and divers die. Industrial accident analysis indicates a ratio of around 1 in 600 of fatalities to reportable accidents, and the British Hyperbaric Association indicates that approximately 3.5 times the number of divers are recompressed as are reported through the BSAC incident reporting system.

=== Failure of accident filters ===
A four layered model for defense against human error has been described, which attributes error to three levels of latent failure and one of active failure, and posits that in general an accident is due to failure of all four levels of defence. These levels are:

- Influence of the organisation, which should provide a culture of safety.
- Supervision, which should provide a system of oversight and checks, and backup for contingencies.
- Preconditions: The state of the diver and equipment, including levels of health, fitness, skill and training, condition and suitability of equipment, planning and communications.
- Actions of the diver: Situational awareness, response to contingencies.

The failures associated with these levels are labelled:

- Organisational influences - a level of latent failures: In professional diving, the employer, diving contractor, health and safety authority etc. In recreational diving, the organisational culture of the training and certification agencies and dive schools, resorts and employers of instructors and divemasters.
- Unsafe supervision - a level of latent failures: In recreational diving this level includes the other members of a dive team, such as the buddy, dive leaders (divemasters) and skippers, who are to some degree responsible for safety.
- Preconditions for unsafe acts - a level of latent failures: These are preconditions in the diver and his equipment which aggravate the risk of diver error occurring.
- Unsafe acts - the active failures: The actions which lead directly to the accident, the actual "Diver error", usually blamed in isolation for the accident.

=== Unsafe actions ===
Unsafe actions can be categorised as errors or violations.

==== Errors ====
Errors are events where the outcome is not that which was intended or hoped for, or expected, and the precipitating action is unintentional.

===== Errors of skill =====
Skill based errors refer to skills learned during training. These should generally be sufficiently well learned to be done without much conscious thought, as an almost automatic reaction to the circumstances. This makes them more reliable in a stressful situation, but also makes them more susceptible to performance loss with retention interval (when not practiced often enough). The rate of performance degradation depends on degree of overlearning, skill type and personal differences.

Other skill based errors involve incorrect technique. This can be a result of incorrect training or inadequate assessment and feedback during training, or learning bad habits after training. Skill based errors are prevented by practicing skills and ensuring that they are effective.

Skill based errors include:

- Incorrect equipment assembly and checking
- Inadequate performance of standard and emergency procedures

- Poor finning technique, causing silting out, inefficient propulsion.
- Poor buoyancy control, causing violations of decompression obligation, barotraumas.

- Omitted step in a procedure where order is critical
- Incorrect gas planning and monitoring

===== Errors of decision =====
These are errors where the actions proceed according to intention, but prove to be inappropriate.

====== Procedural errors ======
- Inappropriate response to an emergency.

- Failing to recognise an emergency in time to take corrective action.
- Failure to communicate a problem to the team.
- Misunderstanding a communication from another diver in difficulty.
- Applying the wrong procedure when the situation is correctly identified.

These errors occur when a situation is either not recognised, or misdiagnosed, or the diver has forgotten the correct reaction. These are all more probable if the stress level is already high unless the procedures have been well entrenched in memory by regular training and practice. Regular training with multiple scenarios and honest debriefings are recommended as mitigation for this class of error.

====== Poor choice ======
- Poor decision on whether or not to terminate a dive.

- Continuing a dive after equipment failure eliminates bailout options.
- Continuing dive after buddy separation.
- Continuing dive in inappropriate environmental conditions.
- Continuing dive after gas critical pressures are reached.
- Continuing dive after agreed time or decompression limits reached.

- Wrong gas chosen for the depth.
- Inadequate thermal protection chosen.
- Diving without appropriate bailout equipment.

====== Problem solving errors ======
When a problem is not fully understood and learned procedures do not fit the situation the diver is more likely to make errors in problem solving.

The suitability of the process for making decisions depends to a large extent on the time available. Immediately life-threatening problems must be dealt with immediately, but other problems allow some time for considering the situation before reacting. As available time increases, the applicability of knowledge based processes and analytical processes also increases.

Errors of decision can be mitigated by ensuring that the diver has experienced a wide variety of reasonably probable scenarios, preferably as live simulations, or if this is not practicable, as mental exercises. Having considered the scenario and worked on problem solving provides a pattern of thought which can assist in solving similar problems in real incidents, and the diver is more likely to work on problem solving and less likely to panic. Instructors with varied, relevant and current diving experience are more likely to provide this sort of training experience.

===== Errors of perception =====
- Misjudgement of environmental conditions.
- Misreading of instruments.
- Misjudgement of gas consumption and requirement
- Disorientation. Misinterpretation of landmarks and loss of way.
- Misperception of ascent or descent rate.

Depth and visual perception errors are easily made underwater as we are not optimised for the environment, and lack of recent experience can aggravate the problem. This can easily lead to disorientation. Nitrogen narcosis can compound this effect and make reasoned judgements considerably more difficult below 30m, but this can be reduced by the use of helium. Colour discrimination is also diminished with depth and darkness, and colour-coding becomes an unreliable method of identifying equipment at the times when it is most critical and an error can be fatal.

Human error is often linked to design details. Some errors are more likely to be made because the design of a control or display can be mistaken for a different control or display under conditions of stress or poor visibility, or the operation of a control is sufficiently complicated to make an error without noticing (as in some dive computer button sequences).

==== Violations ====
Violations are events where the consequences are foreseeable, and the action is taken with knowledge of the possible consequences, and knowledge that the risk is not generally considered acceptable within the organisational environment of the agent.

Routine violations occur when policy violations are made due to a history of "getting away with it", so the perception develops that the risk is lower than it really is and the violation can become the norm. Accident analysis suggests that most accidents are caused by violations of teaching or agency recommendations.

Exceptional violations occur when the procedures or policies are intentionally violated without need or good cause.

Situational violations occur when the consequences of the violation are understood, but the violation is assessed to be the best course of action available under the circumstances.

Some examples of violations:

- Failure to follow dive plan.
- Exceeding range of training or competence.
- Diving without appropriate equipment for the expected circumstances.
- Neglecting to prepare equipment properly
- Exerting pressure on other divers to exceed their range of competence.
- Exceeding MOD of breathing gas.
- Ignoring warning alarms and information on instruments and safety systems.

- going into unplanned decompression
- continuing the dive beyond critical pressures for turnaround or ascent
- continuing the dive after equipment failure has degraded emergency recovery capabilities.

=== Preconditions for unsafe actions ===
==== Substandard practices ====
===== Communication and team skills =====
Good communication and team or buddy skills are necessary to limit the risk of a recoverable incident deteriorating into an accident. A good team has more capacity to deal with an emergency than a solo diver in most circumstances, but in the absence of adequate team or buddy skills, a solo diver may be safer

Team and communications skills are relevant at the planning and preparation stages as well as in the water. A team must be familiar with each other's equipment, and the gas planning of all members must be compatible. Constructive debriefing after the dive can help the team members make the most of the learning opportunities of the dive.

- Planning failures

- Inadequate risk assessment
- Inadequate contingency planning
- Inadequate dive planning: Gas and decompression planning
- Failure to use available and appropriate resources

- Communications failures

- Inadequate briefing
- Misinterpretation of signals
- Failure to log in and out with backup personnel
- Unfamiliarity with buddy or team's equipment.

===== Personal readiness =====
There are a large range of circumstances, some within the control of the dier, some not, which can temporarily degrade the ability of the diver to dive safely. Some of these are purely physical, others have a psychological influence. Many are to some extent self-inflicted.

Examples:

- Accepting the responsibilities of a buddy diver before the dive and then not paying due attention to staying within appropriate distance of the buddy.
- Taking on responsibilities of a buddy diver knowing that one is not capable of carrying them out in an emergency.
- Accepting appointment as standby diver while knowing that one is unfit or not competent to perform a rescue under the apparent circumstances.
- Self medication with unsuitable medications
- Use of alcohol or recreational drugs.
- Inadequate rest
- Dehydration
- Time stress due to running late
- Overheated or chilled
- Poor preparation of personal equipment
- Poor condition of personal equipment
- Denial of existing medical problem

Divers should not be deterred by peer pressure from declining a dive when they are ill-prepared, and they should not allow themselves to be pressured by service providers such as boat skippers and divemasters into accepting responsibility for the safety of another diver if they do not feel confident that both they and the other diver can deal adequately with any reasonably foreseeable problem that may occur during the dive.

==== Substandard conditions of operators ====
===== Adverse mental states =====
Divers need to be aware of their surroundings as they operate in an alien environment and inattention can result in missing a critical cue which could have allowed early response to a problem. Any mental state which is likely to reduce the situational awareness of the diver will increase risk.

Examples:

- Task fixation.
- Complacency.
- Distraction.
- Fatigue.
- Undue haste.
- Lack of situational awareness, inattention.
- Misplaced motivation.
- Excessive task loading.
- Pre-existing stress.

===== Adverse physiological states =====
Diving while in a sub-optimal physical condition reduces the reserves available for dealing with a problem. Clearly not all divers are equal in their physical strength and fitness, but people learn to compensate for personal differences, and become accustomed to dealing with situations from their ground state. Any reduction in capacity from the normal status is likely to present unfamiliar challenges in a crisis, and may precipitate an unrecoverable chain of events, as normally adequate reactions are found to be insufficient, and fail to rectify the situation as expected.

Furthermore, some conditions such as injuries, dehydration or illness may physiologically predispose the diver to other conditions such as decompression sickness, hypothermia or barotraumas.

Examples:

- Impaired physiological condition, illness.
- Physiological incapacitation,

- seasickness,
- hypothermia,
- exhaustion,
- dehydration etc,

===== Physical and mental limitations =====
Personal strength and fitness vary amongst people. Furthermore, they vary with time for the same person, and although the underwater environment reduces the effects of gravity, there are other factors which can make activity more strenuous, such as viscous drag, increased work of breathing and adverse water movements.

Mental abilities also affect a diver's capacity to deal with unexpected situations. Two common factors influencing a diver's accurate and objective assessment of situations and their ability to cope with conditions are ignorance of the realities, and the tendency to overestimate personal competence which is most notable in those with the least ability to make an accurate judgement. Both of these factors can be mitigated by continued study and training. In effect, the best way to learn how to accurately judge competence in a skill set, is to be competent at those skills. In the absence of personal competence, the person must rely on the objective judgement and accurate feedback of instructors, supervisors and other persons in perceived positions of authority. Failure to provide this feedback is not a kindness, it is a dereliction of responsibility, as it may lead to potentially dangerous misjudgements of ability to deal with the rigour of the underwater environment, particularly where the specific circumstances are outside the experience of the diver.

The influence of experience on the accurate self-assessment of competence is not so clear cut. Some incompetent people are able to go through a wide range and depth of experience without discovering their incompetence or improving their skills.

Kruger and Dunning suggest that those with limited knowledge in a field suffer a double burden: "Not only do they reach mistaken conclusions and make regrettable errors, but their incompetence robs them of the ability to realize it."

Examples:

- Physical inability to manage the conditions.
- Inadequate strength or fitness to perform emergency procedures.
- Ignorance of skill limitations.
- Denial of skill limitations.

=== Unsafe supervision ===
Causal factors go beyond the operator, and extend to supervision.

In the context of recreational diving, supervision refers to dive leaders, dive guides, instructors, topside dive marshals and dive boat skippers, and in the club environment, also to the diving officer or training officer and experienced divers acting as mentors to less experienced divers. In the professional context, it refers to the dive supervisor and other on-site management personnel.

Supervisors have a moral duty to their charges, and may have a legal duty as well. These duties may include giving guidance, providing training or learning opportunities, leadership by example and direction, information and motivation.

The duty to act as a good role model is important as although the supervisor may advise or instruct charges to do things in an appropriate way, it is what the role model actually does that often has the most lasting impression.

Poor technique and incorrect information passed on by a person in a supervisory position may perpetuate the use of unsafe or inefficient procedures. Failure to correct poor technique or skills has a similar effect, whether it is due to indifference or ignorance on the part of the supervisor.

A further manifestation of poor supervision may occur when the supervisor does not have the experience appropriate to the current environment.

Unsafe supervision can be split into four categories?

==== Inadequate supervision ====
Examples:

- Failure to provide guidance
- Failure to comply with agency policies or operations manuals
- Failure to provide oversight
- Failure to provide training
- Failure to provide feedback
- Allocation of unsuitable buddies

==== Failure to correct a known problem ====
Examples:

- Failure to correct documentation errors
- Failure to identify a diver at risk
- Failure to initiate corrective action
- Failure to report unsafe tendencies or behaviour
- Failure to report reportable incidents
- Use of equipment or support facilities known to be unreliable or defective

==== Inappropriately planned operations ====
Examples:

- Failure to provide sufficient briefing time
- Failure to allow sufficient time for preparation and checking of equipment and kitting up
- Planning or authorising operations in conflict with authorised procedures, codes of practice, operations manuals, regulations etc.
- Failure to check emergency equipment
- Failure to conduct adequate risk assessment
- Failure to monitor diving operations according to agreed protocol
- Failure to modify dive plans to compensate for changing conditions
- Failure to record next of kin and contact details

==== Supervisory violations ====
Examples:

- Promoting or tolerating in-group peer pressure.
- Sanctioning unnecessary risk
- Failure to enforce regulatory requirements, organizational rules and requirements.
- Sanctioning inappropriate transgression of qualification, experience or known competence.

=== Organisational influences ===
The influence of an organisation are less immediately obvious, and may be difficult to quantify. Many latent unsafe conditions originate with decision makers who are at a distance from the dive site and may be unaware of the full consequences of their directives. They may be biased by economic or political pressures and outdated knowledge and experience. Often decisions are made without full consideration of the possible consequences, not necessarily intentionally, and some unsafe policy decisions can not be avoided, so there should be measures to identify them and mitigate them before they have adverse consequences.

==== Resource management ====
Examples:

- Human resources

- Selection
- Staffing
- Training

- Financial resources

- Excessive cost cutting
- Lack of funding

- Equipment and facilities

- Poor design
- Acquisition of unsuitable equipment
- Inadequate maintenance

==== Organisational philosophy ====
Examples:

- Structure
  - Chain of command
  - Delegation of authority
  - Communication
  - Accountability
- Policies
  - Job security
  - Promotion
  - Dealing with violations
- Culture
  - Norms
  - Values
  - Fairness

A just culture and psychological safety within an organisation encourages reporting and analysis of both incidents and near misses, which facilitates the development of preventative improvements, rather than allocating blame and hiding near misses which tends to stifle and delay improvements to procedure and design until something goes badly wrong and the issues can no longer be avoided.

==== Organisational process ====
Examples:

- Operations

- Time pressure, schedules and deadlines
- Work quotas, measures of success
- Schedules and planning

- Procedures

- Standards
- Clarity of objectives
- Documentation
- Instructions

- Oversight

- Risk management
- Safety programs

== Conditions conducive to errors ==
In the operational environment:

- Interruptions and distractions during tasks that require accurate work, a specific order of actions or a number of critical actions, such as pre-dive checks, assembly of life-support equipment, specially if a written checklist is not in use.
- Late changes of plan and departures from routine.
- Displays which are not clear, controls which can be confused under stress, input and processes which are complex or rely on being performed in a specific order.
- Procedures used to work around a problem using unproven or unfamiliar methods.
- Unfamiliar equipment or unexpected equipment status or condition.
- Circadian rhythm issues.
- Information overload.

In the capacity of the individual:

- Lack of familiarity with the task, lack of proficiency or experience in a skill or procedure.
- Lack of knowledge or information, poor or incorrect understanding of information.
- Poor communication skills, or incompatible communication skills
- Overconfidence in abilities, misconception of personal competence (see Dunning–Kruger effect)
- Physical or psychological unfitness, general or temporary, fatigue or weariness.
- Unawareness of relevant contextual matters.
- Inadequate or degraded situational awareness

In task loading and requirements:

- High task loading
- High exertion
- Multiple simultaneous tasks
- High task complexity
- Time pressure
- Monotonous repetitive tasks
- Unclear goals or standards
- Unclear work allocation, roles, or responsibilities
- Irrecoverable actions.

In general human nature:

- Assumptions
- Attitude
- Complacency
- Communication shortcuts - inaccurate or incomplete communication
- Habits
- Inaccurate perception of risk
- Stress

== Improving dive safety ==
=== Failing safely ===
While there may be multiple barriers to failure, generally none are completely reliable, (swiss cheese model) When all the barriers to adverse events fail, degradation of performance should when possible allow enough time to recognise the failure and provide sufficient information to allow correct or appropriate decisions, so that appropriate action can be taken in time.

- teamwork barriers

=== Accident investigations ===
An investigation of some kind usually follows a fatal diving accident, or one in which litigation is expected. There may be several investigations with different agendas. If police are involved, they generally look for evidence of a crime. In the US the Coastguard will usually investigate if there is a death when diving from a vessel in coastal waters. Health and safety administration officials may investigate when the diver was injured or killed at work. When a death occurs during an organised recreational activity, the certification agency's insurers will usually send an investigator to look into possible liability issues. The investigation may occur almost immediately to some considerable time after the event. In most cases the body will have been recovered and resuscitation attempted, and in this process equipment is usually removed and may be damaged or lost, or the evidence compromised by inappropriate handling. Witnesses may have dispersed, and equipment is often mishandled by the investigating authorities who are often unfamiliar with the equipment and may store it improperly, which can destroy evidence and compromise findings.

Recreational diving accidents are usually relatively uncomplicated, but accidents involving an extended range environment of specialised equipment may require expertise beyond the experience of any one investigator. This is a particular issue when rebreather equipment is involved.

For every incident in which someone is injured of killed, it has been estimated that a relatively large number of "near miss" incidents occur, which the diver manages well enough to avoid harm. Ideally these will be recorded, analysed for cause, reported, and the results made public, so that similar incidents can be avoided in the future.

Professional diving accidents are usually investigated when a reportable injury occurs in terms of occupational health and safety legislation. The purpose is generally to allow avoidance of recurrences of the circumstances leading to the incident if practicable, and where relevant, to establish whether there was fault attributable to any involved party, which could lead to criminal or civil charges.

Accident investigation may help to identify the cause of a specific accident. If a pattern can be identified this may inform procedures and legislation to reduce the risk of the same pattern of accident recurring in the future. An investigation may identify shortcomings in training or procedures, or problems with equipment. Fatalities are often investigated as potential crimes until the cause of death has been identified. Insurance claims may rely on information from an investigation to establish whether the accident is covered by a policy. Occupational health and safety inspectors may investigate an occupational diving incident to identify whether regulations have been violated. Civil litigation for claimed damages can be more equitably decided when the circumstances leading to the injury have been identified. The ability to provide documentary evidence showing that correct procedure was followed can simplify the investigation and may lead to more accurate and reliable findings.

Equipment, procedures, organization, environment, individual factors and interactions between them are the sources of contributing and compounding events and conditions. Analysis of near accidents can be of great value to identify sources of error and allow planning to reduce or eliminate contributing and compounding conditions. A safety study estimated about a million shortcuts taken per fatal accident.

Accident investigations typically focus on the end event, and attempt to erect barriers to similar accidents, such as personal protection equipment, backup equipment or alarm systems. These are intended to prevent the recurrence of similar accidents, and are often effective in this limited goal. Accidents continue to occur because the majority of the contributing and compounding factors are not addressed. Human behavior and the systems in which people work are too complex to analyse all possible interactions. A more effective route to accident prevention is to reduce or mitigate the occurrence of human error by focusing on the contributing and compounding human factors that create an environment in which accidents are likely to occur.

The quality of diving accident investigation in the US is very variable between states. In many cases the investigators have no experience, training or understanding of diving theory or practice, so competence is inadequate, and there is often also a lack of interest and unwillingness to call in experts, or sometimes even ignorance of what evidence (such as data logged by the dive computer or the rebreather control system) can be provided by diving equipment, while may of the investigators do not know how to access or preserve the evidence. In the USA, equipment manufacturers are legally obliged to investigate fatal accidents in which their products are involved so they can inform the U.S. Consumer Product Safety Commission within 24 hours if something about their product caused the harm, and therefore have a legal right to access to the information, and also have a duty to correct a problem if it is found to exist. The equipment manufacturers and training agencies tend to be represented by attorneys and technical experts, who can only discover problems if they are allowed access to the equipment. This access is frequently denied or hindered by the investigating authorities, making what could potentially be life-saving corrections difficult or impossible. This blocking of access to information hinders attempts to make diving safer for the general public. The United States Coast Guard, US National Park Service, sheriffs offices and medical examiners have been named as contributing to this problem.

The accident investigation is intended to identify the elements in the causal chain. In commonwealth countries such as the UK, Canada, Australia where a coroners inquest is usually held, experts are often called in, evidence is gathered and is made publicly available.

The chain of events starts with one or more triggering events which leads to the disabling agent (harmful event), which causes the disabling injury, which leads to the cause of death, which in most cases is drowning, but a finding of drowning is, on its own, not usually useful to improve safety, simply because so many possible chains of events underwater lead to drowning.

=== Learning from accidents ===
The general recreational diving community's capacity for learning from accidents is limited by several factors, though this is not a universal trend:

== Uncertainty of risk ==
Risk in diving is seldom known with any accuracy. The large amount of uncertainty regarding the probability of most forms of failure make it necessary for the diver or diving supervisor to estimate risk based on experience and what little data is available, often not much more than personal experience. Decisions based on these estimates tend to be affected by bias and circumstances. A dive that has required a major outlay in time and monetary cost, or which affects reputation, if cancelled, represents a definite loss, which when balanced against a possible loss of unknown probability, may induce the team to take a greater risk than if the perceived loss due to cancellation were less, even when the likely consequences of the low probability consequences are relatively dire. There is a tendency for losses to have a bigger subjective value than gains, which pushes people to risk more to avoid a definite loss.

Various cognitive biases may influence decisions whether or not to cancel a dive on site:

- Plan continuation bias and the sunk cost fallacy
- Availability bias
- Hindsight bias
- Overconfidence
- Dunning–Kruger effect. When one doesn't know what one doesn't know, incompetent decisions may be made without being aware of it. When training and education are reduced to the minimum which appears to provide competence to manage the situations which are likely to occur within the restricted scope of operations associated with a certification, the person cannot effectively extrapolate into the adjacent reality of circumstances which may occur in practice when the operation goes beyond the limits of the defined scope, whether intentionally or due to unforeseen circumstances. Informed acceptance of risk is limited by knowledge and understanding of the hazards, consequences and probabilities involved.
- Practical drift, the tendency for actual procedure and performance to diverge from the designed, trained, or recommended procedural baseline due to conflicts with perceived reality, and Normalisation of deviance, the tendency to accept practices that do not comply with standards after experiencing a continued lack of catastrophic consequences while following the non-compliant practices. The reasons for initial non-compliance vary, and may include operational or time pressures, or a procedure being judged inadequate, inefficient, or unnecessary. This will frequently continue until an accident occurs. Both of these effects are encouraged by excessively stringent or unnecessary constraints claimed to be in the pursuit of safety, but perceived to be obstructive to operational efficiency. These effects may be combined with an expectation of compliance by other parties, which may be unrealistic.
  Compliance does not always result in safety, as rules and procedures cannot be written to effectively cover all possible situations. In many cases rules are largely followed as a protection against litigation, and in some cases may be in place specifically for that purpose, rather than to ensure operational safety, and sometimes strict compliance can produce unsafe situations. An understanding of the principles and the logic of the reasons why rules are in place allows the diving team to modify procedures when needed, though they may technically be non-compliant.
- Peer pressure:

One of the strategies available for reducing these tendencies is setting the goals for the dive. In professional diving this is a requirement. Professional divers dive for a specific purpose, so it is easier to be more objective in making decisions based on the situation on-site. Recreational divers tend to have less clearly defined goals, which makes decision making more susceptible to cognitive bias. For this purpose, it helps to have well defined goals, which are measurable, specific and meaningful to the dive team, for which the criteria for success are clear, and for which the reward is worth the risk.

Any plan may fail: in high consequence situations, it is important that when failure occurs, it is safe failure, and that when any further single point of failure may have unacceptable consequences, the dive is called off. Good contingency planning makes the dive plan more robust.

A mechanism for adaptation of procedures to better fit the demands of the work is desirable, and this may involve adapting the work to allow sufficient flexibility of practice, so that alternative procedures can be developed. A large allowable range of procedural variation facilitates effective learning.

== Cultural factors ==
A culture is an attribute of a group of people, which has been loosely defined as "How we do things around here". Organisations that have been established for some time develop a culture which tends to stabilise and develop inertia. A culture is a complex emergent property of the relationships and interactions of a group of people, rather than a property of the individual members.

A large part of the safety culture of recreational diving has been described as "pathological" in terms of the Hudson and Parker safety culture ladder, (Note: The six levels of the Hudson and Parker safety culture ladder are: Pathological: The focus is on regulatory compliance and not getting caught in non-compliance.; Reactive: safety is mainly taken seriously after things have gone wrong.; Calculative: focus on systems and statistics. Data is collected and analysed, and audits are performed, but the relevance of the data in not always proven.; Proactive: focus on preventing what might go wrong in the future.; Generative: failure is used to build improvement, not to blame. Management is informed by the workforce and the organisation prepares for the unexpected.) which focuses on rules and standards compliance, at the expense of operational safety. While rules are a useful starting point for discussion and evaluation of procedures for improving safety, they do not often consider context of the related activity. There is a disconnect between "work as imagined" and "work as done".

=== Cultural inertia and resistance to change ===
Bodies at the highest levels of recreational diving training policy making, such as the World Recreational Scuba Training Council (WRSTC), the Rebreather Training Council (RTC) and the Rebreather Education and Safety Association (RESA) are made up predominantly of members who have a significant investment in the status quo, and may also have a veto power on change if it does not suit their interests. This may be strongest where for-profit organisations are involved, but the effect also occurs with non-profits as they also need to remain financially viable to survive.

The standards written by these bodies are used to develop training and assessment materials, which instructors are trained to use in training and assessing learners. Most training agencies do nor require re-qualification to retain teaching status, just payment of an annual renewal fee, and commonly a minimum annual number of student certifications registered. There is seldom any further quality assurance process, and practical drift may occur unchecked. Diver training tends to follow a rote process, based more on standards compliance than actual transfer and understanding of knowledge. In some cases the depth and breadth of knowledge required by the standard is minimised to allow easier memorisation, but with the side effect of being insufficient to develop a useful comprehension of the bigger picture in which the specified knowledge is a part.

The focus in diver and instructor education is often on continuing education, breaking the training down into small, convenient, easily manageable units, with just enough content to justify the specified certification, and relying on return business to build on that foundation, in the hope that it will still be sufficiently solid to support the next training programme. This can promote a culture of "card collecting", where the perceived value is in the certification rather than the competence nominally associated with the card.

Words like Advanced and Master, used in the context of recreational certification, such as advanced open water diver, peak performance buoyancy, master scuba diver, or master scuba diving instructor are used to market further courses where performance- or evidence-based reasons for the description are dubious or lacking, and the minimum competence level required for the related certification is quite ordinary in comparison with predecessor courses. Divers can move rapidly through the system, including to instructor level, without much breadth or depth of real-world diving experience.

Talking about one's own mistakes, especially as an instructor, is not something actively promoted within most agencies, as it is perceived to expose instructors to possible litigation. The mantra of "dive within your limits and training", if followed, limits the divers' experience to environments where most things are controlled, and can leave them unprepared for when things do not go to plan. Other organisations encourage gradual and careful development of experience in small steps. Followed strictly, diving within ones training is extremely limiting, and it is not explained exactly what ones limits are, and they are not necessarily restricted to conditions identical to those in which training was done.

Recreational diver training and certification organisations tend to avoid admitting that it may be necessary or desirable to gradually dive beyond one's current limits to develop experience, for fear that this could expose them to litigation, but divers who explore beyond the limits of their current experience, cautiously and intelligently, are the people who break new ground which those same organisations later exploit for profit. Experience and expertise come from pushing boundaries, making mistakes, failing safely, and learning from them.

- Failures to lead by example. Cases where high profile members and officials of organisations have very visibly grossly violated the rules of their own organisations.

== See also ==
- Acceptable risk – Risk that is understood and tolerated
- Buddy diving – Practice of mutual monitoring and assistance between two divers
- Diving safety – Risk management of underwater diving activities
- Ergonomics – Designing systems to suit their users
- Failure mode and effects analysis – Analysis of potential system failures
- Fault tree analysis – Failure analysis system used in safety engineering and reliability engineering
- High reliability organization – Organization successful in avoiding catastrophes where accidents are expected due to risk
- Human error – Action with unintended consequences
- Human factors in diving equipment design – Influence of the interaction between the user and the equipment on design
- Informed consent – Ethical principle
- Just culture – Balanced accountability for both individuals and the organization
- List of diving hazards and precautions – Hazards associated with underwater diving
- Occupational safety and health, also known as Occupational health and safety – Field concerned with the safety, health and welfare of people at work
- Resilience engineering – Subfield of safety science research
- Safety culture – Risk-averse attitudes
- Safety engineering – Engineering discipline
