= Deepwater Horizon Oil Spill Trust =

The Deepwater Horizon Oil Spill Trust is the $20 billion trust fund established by BP to settle claims arising from the Deepwater Horizon oil spill. The fund was established to be used for natural resource damages, state and local response costs and individual compensation. It was established as Gulf Coast Claims Facility (GCCF), announced on 16 June 2010 after a meeting of BP executives with U.S. President Barack Obama. In June 2012, the settlement of claims through the GCCF was replaced by the court supervised settlement program.

== Background ==
After the Deepwater Horizon oil spill started, BP promised to compensate all those affected. Then CEO Tony Hayward stated, "We are taking full responsibility for the spill and we will clean it up and where people can present legitimate claims for damages we will honor them. We are going to be very, very aggressive in all of that." Prior to establishing the GCCF, emergency compensation was paid by BP from an initial facility.

== Gulf Coast Claims Facility ==
=== Establishment ===
On 16 June, after meeting with President Obama, BP executives agreed to create a $20 billion spill response fund. BP said it would pay $3 billion in third quarter of 2010 and $2 billion in fourth quarter into the fund followed by a payment of $1.25 billion per quarter until it reaches $20 billion. In the interim, BP posted its US assets worth $20 billion as bond. The amount of the fund was not a cap on BP's liabilities. For the fund's payments, BP said it would cut its capital spending budget, sell $10 billion in assets, and drop its dividend. After provisions of the Deepwater Horizon Oil Spill Trust were released 11 August 2010, it was revealed that the BP Spill Fund may be backed by future drilling revenue, using BP's production as collateral. BP pledged as collateral all royalties from the Thunder Horse, Atlantis, Mad Dog, Great White, Mars, Ursa, and Na Kika fields in the Gulf of Mexico.

Two independent trustees, Kent Syverud and John S. Martin, were named to administer the account.

One aim of the fund was said to be minimizing lawsuits against the company. According to BP officials, the fund could be used for natural resource damages, state and local response costs and individual compensation but could not be used for fines or penalties.

=== Operations ===
The Gulf Coast Claims Facility began accepting claims on 23 August 2010. At the time it was handed over to Kenneth Feinberg, BP had already paid out $375 million. Almost 19,000 claims were submitted in the first week. Of those, roughly 1,200 claims were compensated, totaling about $6 million, the remaining applicants "lacked proper paperwork". Feinberg pointed out that those closest to the spill area were the most likely to receive compensation. Claimants could receive between one and six months' compensation without waiving their right to sue; only those who file for and receive a lump-sum payment later in the year will waive their right to litigate.

By November, BP said it had sent $1.7 billion in checks. About 92,000 claimants had been paid or approved for payment as of 30 October 2010. The claims facility declined to reveal the total amount requested by the nearly 315,000 people who have now filed. Denied claims rose dramatically in October; some 20,000 people had been told they have no right to emergency compensation, compared to about 125 denials at the end of September. Others say they are getting mere fractions of what they've lost, while still others received large checks and full payments.

As of 8 September 2010, 50,000 claims, 44,000 of those for lost income, had been filed. Over 10,000 claims had been paid, totaling nearly $80 million. By 17 September, about 15,000 claims remained unpaid. The claims were from individuals and businesses that had been fully documented and had already received loss payments from BP. Feinberg acknowledged that he had no excuse for the delay. By early October, denied claims dropped from 528 to 116, as checks were cut and mailed to businesses that were initially told they would get no help. Along with those still waiting for money, dozens of people say they have received small fractions of the compensation they requested. To July 2011, the fund has paid $4.7 billion to 198,475 claimants. The total number who have filed claims stands at 522,506, many with multiple claims. In all, the fund had nearly 1 million claims.

Over its existence More than one million claims of 220,000 individual and business claimants were processed and more than $6.2 billion was paid out from the fund. 97% of payments were made to claimants in the Gulf States. During the transition period before the settlement of claims through the GCCF was replaced by the court supervised settlement program additional $404 million in claims were paid.

=== Feinberg's controversies ===
Feinberg confirmed that BP is paying his salary, but questioned who else should pay it. Feinberg has been asked repeatedly to reveal his salary. In late July 2010, he stated that he would disclose the salary BP is paying him, after initially declining to do so. In mid-August, he said that he would disclose the amount "probably next month" but insisted he is not beholden to BP. However, in early October, he had not yet divulged the information as promised and when asked, declined to say how much he was compensated, only that it is a flat fee "totally unrelated" to the size of the fund and amounts paid. On 8 October 2010, it was revealed that Feinberg and his law firm have been paid more than $2.5 million from mid-June to 1 October.

Feinberg stated, "If I haven't found you eligible, no court will find you eligible." Florida Attorney General Bill McCollum disputed Feinberg's statement in a letter. By late September 2010, Floridians and businesses criticized the claims process, claiming it has gotten worse under Feinberg's leadership, some saying the president and BP "should dump Feinberg if he doesn't get his act together soon". The Obama administration responded to criticism from Florida officials, including Gov. Charlie Crist and CFO Alex Sink, with a stern letter to Feinberg, saying the present pace of claims is "unacceptable" and directing his office to make whatever changes necessary to move things along. "The Deepwater Horizon Oil Spill has disrupted the lives of thousands upon thousands of individuals, often cutting off the income on which they depend. Many of these individuals and businesses simply do not have the resources to get by while they await processing by the GCCF" associate U.S. Attorney General Thomas Perrelli wrote. One family in Louisiana has been waiting for a month on emergency funds from Feinberg's Gulf Coast Claims Fund, and says for them it is urgent. "Bills aren't paid, they take my car, they take my insurance, they take my house, and then I can't get him back and forth to dialysis," claims the wife of the former owner of "Lafourche Seafood".

On 25 September, Feinberg responded to the complaints in a news release. "Over the past few weeks, I have heard from the people of the Gulf, elected officials, and others that payments remain too slow and not generous enough," Feinberg said. "I am implementing new procedures that will make this program more efficient, more accelerated and more generous." In less than five weeks, the dedicated $20 billion fund that BP set up has paid out over $400 million to more than 30,000 claimants. Funds allocated so far equal 2% of the total amount that BP agreed to set aside. Feinberg has denied about 2,000 claims, another 20,000 applications were returned for more financial documentation, and about 15,000 more claims await review. Feinberg has said he's processing claims at a rate of 1,500 a day.

In a letter sent 20 November by the Department of Justice (DOJ), Associate Attorney General Thomas Perrelli told Kenneth Feinberg that transparency is needed in the claims process so victims can see they're being treated fairly. The DOJ also expressed concerns about the pace of the pay-out process as the interim and final claims begin.

Feinberg had said claimants would have to surrender their right to sue BP to receive payments beyond emergency disbursements. The deadline to apply for emergency payments expired 23 November. But after Gulf residents complained that the emergency payments were so small that they felt pushed into a hurried settlement to get more money, Feinberg made a concession. Under the new rules (beginning 24 November and lasting until 23 August 2013), businesses and individuals may request compensation once a quarter while they decide whether to permanently settle their claim. Still, the claims process has its critics. Alabama Rep. Jo Bonner asked the Justice Department to investigate the claims facility and to assume direct oversight of the process, saying he had no more trust in the new process than he had in the emergency-payment program. Feinberg had said he would hire his own adjusters, but according to Rep. Bonner, he is still using the same ones as when BP administered the fund. A spokeswoman for Feinberg said the hiring process of new adjusters was under way.

According to BP's law firm, Feinberg's law firm received a total of $3.3 million from BP as of early November. The law firm was paid $850,000 a month since June 2010, and payment of this fee will continue until the end of the year; afterwards, the contract will be reviewed.

In March 2011, Feinberg's law firm received an increase in the monthly wage from BP. Compensation rose from $850,000 to $1.25 million.

In July 2011, Mississippi's attorney general Jim Hood announced he is suing Feinberg to get access to claims filed by coastal residents, saying he's "seeking to make the process more transparent so people will know if Feinberg is looking out for the best interests of oil spill victims or BP". Hood has stated he believes Feinberg's operation is "intentionally delaying and denying legitimate claims". Feinberg has been criticized by others about the amount and speed of payments as well as a lack of transparency.

=== Closure ===
In July 2011, Attorney General Eric Holder announced that an independent audit will be performed on the GCCF. The audit was approved by Senate on 21 October 2011. In December 2011 BDO Consulting was selected as the auditor. In early 2012, auditor found that 7,300 claimants were wrongly denied or underpaid. As a result, about $64 million of additional payments were made. 2,600 claimants were incorrectly rejected but "can't get their money now because their files didn't include information needed to calculate their proper payment amount".

On 8 March 2012, after BP and a team of plaintiffs' attorneys agreed to a class-action settlement, a court-supervised administrator Patrick Juneau took over administration. In June 2012, the settlement of claims through the GCCF was replaced by the court supervised settlement program.

== Court supervised settlement program ==
The court supervised settlement program began on 4 June 2012. It covers $9.6 billion of the total $20 billion. It is administrated by the court appointed settlement administrator Patrick Juneau. Claims through the program will be accepted until April 2014.

In March 2013, BP sued Patrick Juneau over his interpretation of the settlement agreement conditions and damage claims arguing that Juneau has compensated certain business economic-loss claims which were not seen in the agreement. In April 2013, BP requested to halt claims payouts from the fund due to a number of fraudulent damages. According to BP, more than 7000 claims were "scams". According to BP's CEO Bob Dudley, disputed claims accounts more than a billion dollars. The request was rejected by the district judge of the United States District Court for the Eastern District of Louisiana Carl Barbier. Barbier reasoned his decision saying that "BP has not produced any evidence that would warrant the court taking the drastic step of shutting down the entire claims program."

As of 30 June 2013, the total payments made from the fund amounted to $19.7 billion. After paying out remaining $300 million, the remaining claims will be compensated from the company's future profits.
