= RaDonda Vaught homicide case =

American legal trial, held in 2022

Tennessee v. Vaught
- Date: March 21, 2022
- Venue: Davidson County Criminal Court
- Location: Nashville, Tennessee
- Outcome: Conviction
- Convicted: RaDonda L. Vaught
- Charges: Reckless Homicide, Gross Neglect of an Impaired Adult
- Verdict: Guilty (Gross Neglect of an Impaired Adult) Guilty (Negligent Homicide; as a lesser included charge of Reckless Homicide) Not Guilty (Reckless Homicide)
- Sentence: Three Years of Probation

State of Tennessee v. RaDonda L. Vaught was an American legal trial in which former Vanderbilt University Medical Center nurse RaDonda Vaught was convicted of criminally negligent homicide and impaired adult abuse after she administered the wrong medication to a patient on December 26, 2017, resulting in their death. She was sentenced to three years of probation.

Vaught's trial, which was held in Nashville, Tennessee, in March 2022, garnered national attention and sparked debate over when it should be appropriate to prosecute health care professionals for medical errors that result in harm to patients.

Nurses and other medical practitioners closely monitored the trial, and many expressed concern, alarm, and outrage following the verdict. Some experts and professional organizations warned that the case was likely to negatively affect the quality of American health care by discouraging health care workers from reporting their mistakes. Similarly, the case was seen as undermining the practice of just culture, a concept that had been widely popularized in the medical field over the past two decades. Proponents of just culture tend to view errors as system failures and discourage penalizing workers who report making them.

Concerns were also raised that Vaught's prosecution would cause some nurses to leave the field, or would cause some prospective nurses not to enter it in the first place, at a time when there was already a nursing shortage.

== Incident and aftermath ==
RaDonda Vaught began work as a nurse at Vanderbilt University Medical Center in December 2015.

On December 24, 2017, 75-year-old Charlene Murphey was admitted to the hospital for a subdural hematoma. Two days later, Vaught, a registered nurse, was instructed to administer Versed (midazolam, a sedating drug) to Murphey, but instead administered vecuronium (a paralyzing drug). Murphey was to be given Versed prior to an MRI scan.

Vaught initially tried to withdraw Versed from an automated dispensing cabinet which was designed to communicate with the hospital's Medication Administration Record (MAR). Though an order for the intended medication (Versed) was present in Murphey's MAR, Vaught "couldn't find [it] in Murphey's profile" in the dispensing cabinet after typing "VE" into its search function without realizing she should have been looking for its generic name, midazolam. Vaught then triggered an override that unlocked a much larger swath of medications and then searched for "VE" again, and selected the first medication in the list (vecuronium).

Vaught claimed that using overrides was a common and daily occurrence; other witnesses similarly testified that technical issues and delays at medication cabinets were common, and that "nurses could use overrides to overcome those delays."

Vaught looked at the back of the vial and saw that it needed to be reconstituted, but did not look at the front of the vial to verify that it was, indeed, Versed. Vaught proceeded to reconstitute the vial, went to the imaging unit, and administered a dose to Murphey. Murphey went into cardiac arrest at the imaging unit following administration of the medication, and was transferred to an intensive care unit. After Murphey was transferred, Vaught informed other staff that she had administered vecuronium and admitted to several errors (with her admissions detailed in a Tennessee Bureau of Investigation investigative report). Murphey was placed on life support which was withdrawn the next day as a result of permanent brain death.

Vaught was fired from the hospital after an internal investigation in January 2018 and was arrested and charged in Murphey's death in 2019.

== Revocation of nursing license ==
After the incident, the Tennessee Board of Nursing reviewed Vaught's case and initially rendered "a decision that [the] matter did not merit further action." However, In September 2019, the Tennessee Department of Health's Board of Nursing reversed their decision, charging Vaught with three infractions: unprofessional conduct, abandoning or neglecting a patient who required care, and failing to maintain an accurate patient record.

In July 2021, the nursing board revoked Vaught's license and fined her $3,000. During her testimony, she took responsibility for the error, but also described procedural issues at the hospital. "Overriding was something we did as a part of our practice every day. You couldn't get a bag of fluids for a patient without using an override function."

The Institute for Safe Medication Practices called the board decision "disturbing and unjust." It alleged that the decision reflected "significant outcome bias," "inability to differentiate between human error, at-risk behavior, and reckless behavior," "lack of a thorough investigation," and other shortcomings.

== Criminal trial ==
After being delayed for more than a year due to the COVID-19 pandemic, Vaught's trial began on March 21, 2022.

Prosecutors portrayed the use of the override function as evidence of recklessness. On the other hand, defense experts testified that overrides were daily events at many hospitals, and Vaught testified that Vanderbilt's 2017 upgrade of its computer systems had caused such delays that nurses were instructed to use overrides to get medication that they needed.

A Tennessee Bureau of Investigation agent testified that the medical center had a "heavy burden of responsibility" for the deadly medication error, but that the Bureau of Investigation only pursued criminal charges and penalties against the nurse, not the hospital.

After Murphey's death, the hospital did not report the error to federal or state regulators (as required by law) and reported to the county medical examiner that Murphey died of natural causes with no mention of the vecuronium. The hospital also negotiated an out-of-court settlement with Murphey's family which prevents them from disclosing details of her death.

On March 25, 2022, the jury convicted Vaught of gross neglect of an impaired adult and negligent homicide, which carries a maximum sentence of eight years in prison. She was acquitted of the more serious charge of reckless homicide. On May 13, 2022, Judge Jennifer Smith ruled that Vaught would not have to spend time in prison, sentencing her instead to three years' probation.

== Public reaction ==
After the trial, a Change.org petition requesting clemency for Vaught quickly garnered over 200,000 signatures.

In response to the public backlash, the prosecutor's office issued a statement in which it defended its decision to prosecute Vaught: "The jury's conviction of Radonda Vaught was not an indictment against the nursing profession or the medical community. This case was, and always has been about the gross neglect by Radonda Vaught that caused the death of Charlene Murphey."

Nursing unions and other concerned organizations issued statements warning that Vaught's prosecution could set a precedent for criminalizing honest medical errors and lead to compromised patient care due to medical workers failing to report their errors out of fear of severe punishment.

Janie Harvey Garner of Show Me Your Stethoscope, a nurse advocacy group, said that Vaught's case undermined the practice of just culture, which seeks to improve health care by not penalizing health care workers who are transparent about mistakes and near mistakes. The "just culture" philosophy has been adopted by hospitals since a 1999 study by the National Academy of Medicine found that 98,000 people may have been dying due to medical errors annually.

Robin Begley of the American Hospital Association said the case was likely to have a "chilling effect on the culture of safety in health care."

The American Nurses Association, the American Association of Critical-Care Nurses, and the National Medical Association all expressed concern that Vaught's prosecution set a "dangerous precedent."

The American Nurses Association stated:

"We are deeply distressed by this verdict and the harmful ramifications of criminalizing the honest reporting of mistakes.

Health care delivery is highly complex. It is inevitable that mistakes will happen, and systems will fail. It is completely unrealistic to think otherwise. The criminalization of medical errors is unnerving, and this verdict sets into motion a dangerous precedent. There are more effective and just mechanisms to examine errors, establish system improvements and take corrective action. The non-intentional acts of Individual nurses like RaDonda Vaught should not be criminalized to ensure patient safety.

The nursing profession is already extremely short-staffed, strained and facing immense pressure – an unfortunate multi-year trend that was further exacerbated by the effects of the pandemic. This ruling will have a long-lasting negative impact on the profession."

The American Bar Association issued a statement saying that, "A robust culture of safety relies on self-reporting and transparency to drive process improvement, and criminalizing errors instead foments blame and creates fear."
