= Seawind Ocean Technology =

Dutch manufacturing company

Seawind Ocean Technology B.V.
- Type: B.V. (Privately held company)
- ISIN: 63902796
- Industry: Renewable Energy, Floating Wind Power Generation
- Predecessors: Condor Wind Energy Ltd; Blue H Technologies B.V.
- Founded: 2014
- Headquarters: Amsterdam, Netherlands
- Key people: Vincent Dewulf (CEO & Chairman); Geoff Henderson (CTO)
- Products: Floating Wind Turbine, Technology, OEM, Project Management, R&D, Offshore Wind Energy
- Website: www.seawindtechnology.com

Seawind Ocean Technology B.V., a Netherlands based company, is a manufacturer (OEM) of integrated floating wind turbine and green hydrogen systems. Seawind is developing two-bladed floating wind turbines (6.2 MW and 12.2 MW) suitable for installation in all seas, including hurricane regions and ultra-deep waters. Founded on original research and development work by NASA, Hamilton Standard (now United Technologies Corporation/Raytheon Technologies), Enel, and Aeritalia; Seawind's offshore wind power turbines with integrated foundations have been patented, proven at 1.5 MW, and achieved Type D DNV certification in December 2019. The company is now planning the launch of its Seawind 6 demonstrator to be followed by the pre-series Seawind 12, a project earmarked for installation as early as 2024-25 that seeks to obtain DNV's highest certification level.

== Overview ==
Seawind Ocean Technology is developing offshore wind energy solutions that meet the needs of large and small installations to support global decarbonization. Seawind's technology stems from Glidden Doman’s flexible two-bladed turbine system design that is compliant with the forces of nature rather than resistant to them. Seawind's robust design simplicity, which supports higher turbine rotation speeds, achieves lower torque, lower fatigue, a lighter drive train, and a longer life due to the teetering hub technology. The company's teetering hub technology works in conjunction with a yaw power control system that eliminates all blade pitch control mechanisms.

Seawind's floating wind turbines, which allow for increased accessibility through its nacelle helideck, do not require pile driving, cranes, and heavy vessels for installation at sea. Seawind's system design results in a simpler turbine with fewer parts that significantly reduces overall weight. The Seawind 12.2 MW turbine has a 640-ton turbine head weight, which is 210 tons lower than its nearest comparable competitor. This weight disparity substantially increases the power generated per ton, making it a highly efficient turbine. Reducing design complexity and the turbine head weight on top a floating wind turbine system is critical to ensure structural stability and technology optimization.

Seawind calculates the levelized cost of energy (LCOE) for the energy produced by its two-bladed floating wind turbines to be more than 25% lower than state-of-the-art three-bladed offshore wind energy technologies. Seawind states that its projected LCOE advantage will also accelerate the company's target objectives for offshore and onshore green hydrogen production.

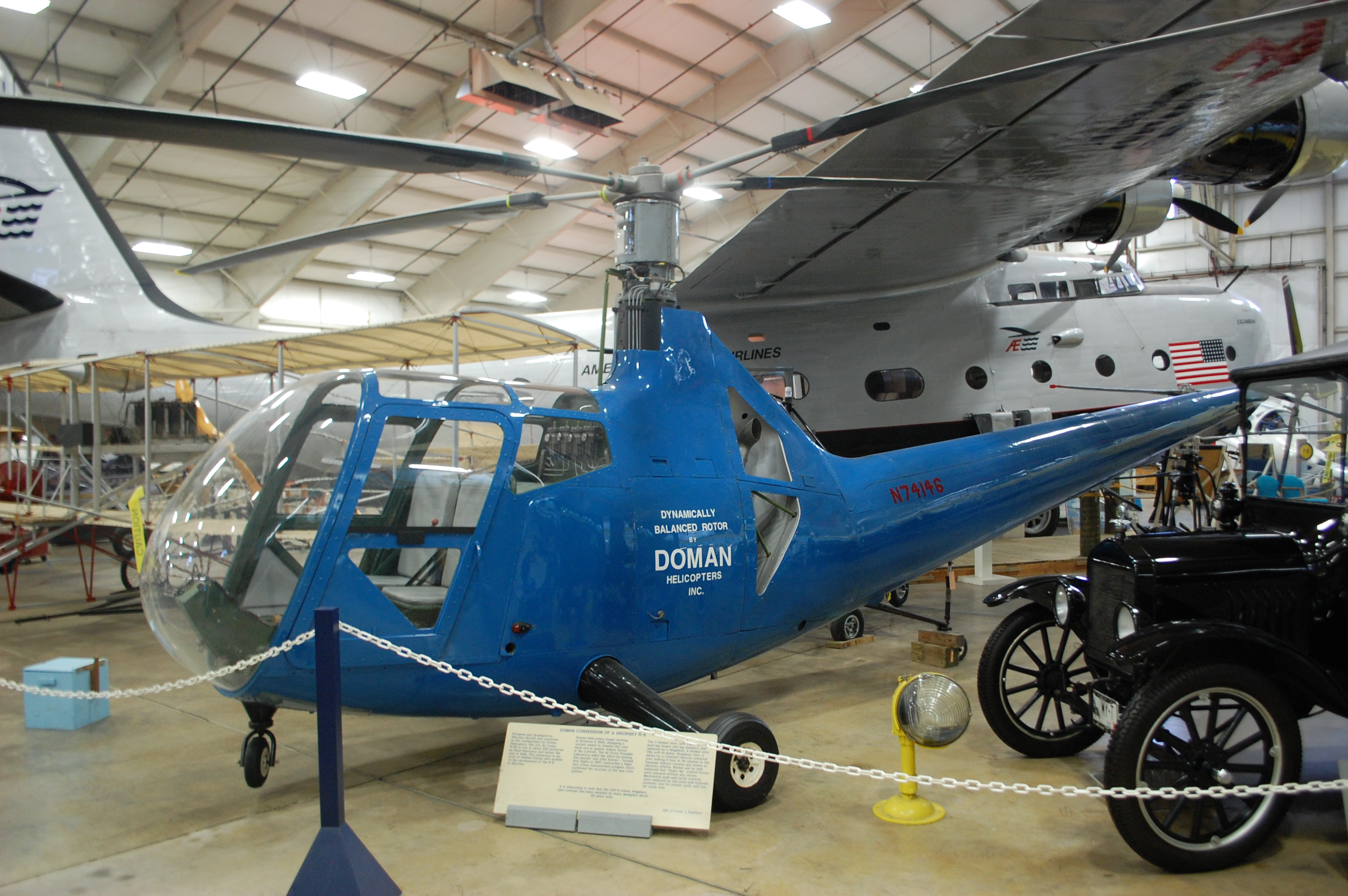
Doman LZ-1A (Sikorsky R-6 conversion)

== History ==
=== Helicopter innovations ===
Evolution of Seawind's floating wind turbine technology can be traced back to World War II when Sikorsky Aircraft (now United Technologies Corporation) hired American engineer Glidden Doman to address helicopter structural and dynamic problems including blade failures. Igor Sikorsky developed and flew the first successful helicopter in the United States during 1939.

Doman's successful efforts for Sikorsky led to the filing of patents and the establishment of Doman Helicopters, Inc., one of America's original six helicopter companies, on 31 August 1945. In 1947, Doman Helicopters purchased a Sikorsky R-6 from the United States Army Air Corps to test its new rotor design and control system, which featured an unorthodox gimbaled rotor head system that eliminated rotor hinges and dampers while including blades of soft-in-plane dynamic design. Doman's initial helicopter, the LZ-1A - a Sikorsky R-6 converted to a Doman rotor and control system, first flew in 1947. The LZ-1A was followed in development by the larger LZ-4 in 1950. Doman Helicopters' crowning achievement was the Doman LZ-5/YH-31 eight-place helicopter, which achieved FAA certification on 30 December 1955. The unique feature of this helicopter was its hinge-less but gimbaled, tilting rotor hub that greatly reduced stress and vibration in the blades and in the whole helicopter.

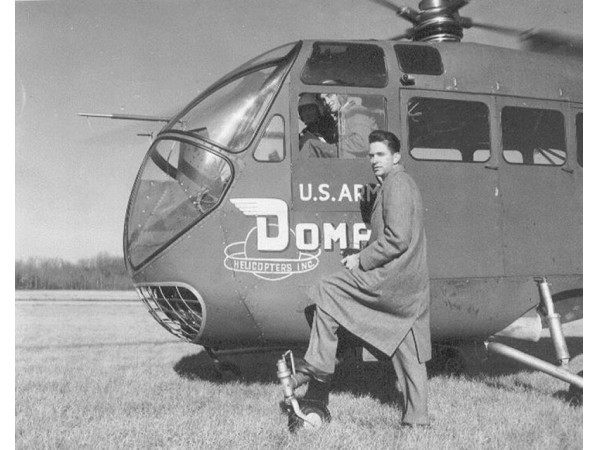
Glidden Doman with the Doman LZ-5/YH-31 helicopter (1953)

Doman Helicopters, Inc operated for 25 years by applying its engineering concepts and manufacturing capabilities to a number of applications beyond helicopters. Pilots that have flown Doman's helicopters note the exceptional hovering stability, significant reduction in vibrations, and the ‘finger-tip control’ with which they could fly the machines.

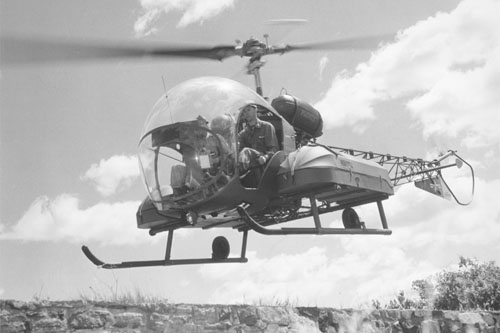
Bell 47 (H-13G)

=== Two-bladed helicopters ===
Two-bladed, teetering hinge rotor designs have been used extensively in helicopters, most notably in numerous models and many thousands of helicopters built by the Bell Helicopter company. The Bell 47, with its distinctive "soap bubble" cockpit canopy windshield, was used in the Korean War (e.g. MEDEVAC missions, in M*A*S*H series, and one is on display at the Museum of Modern Art in New York) and the Bell 204 was used extensively in the Vietnam War.

Bell's two-bladed rotor with a teetering hinge and Doman Helicopters' four-bladed rotor with a gimbaled hinge, offered similar benefits in reducing stresses in the rotor blades and preventing much of the stress from being transmitted to the fuselage. Glidden Doman believed that the four-bladed rotor was smoother during a helicopter's forward flight, but since wind turbines are not involved in forward flight, the two-bladed wind turbine design offered the same benefits with greater simplicity.

Two of Doman's helicopters, the converted Sikorsky R-6 (Doman LZ-1A) and a Doman LZ-5/YH-31, are on display at the New England Air Museum in Windsor Locks, Connecticut. Glidden Doman was one of the first to transfer knowledge of helicopter rotor dynamics technology to wind turbines.

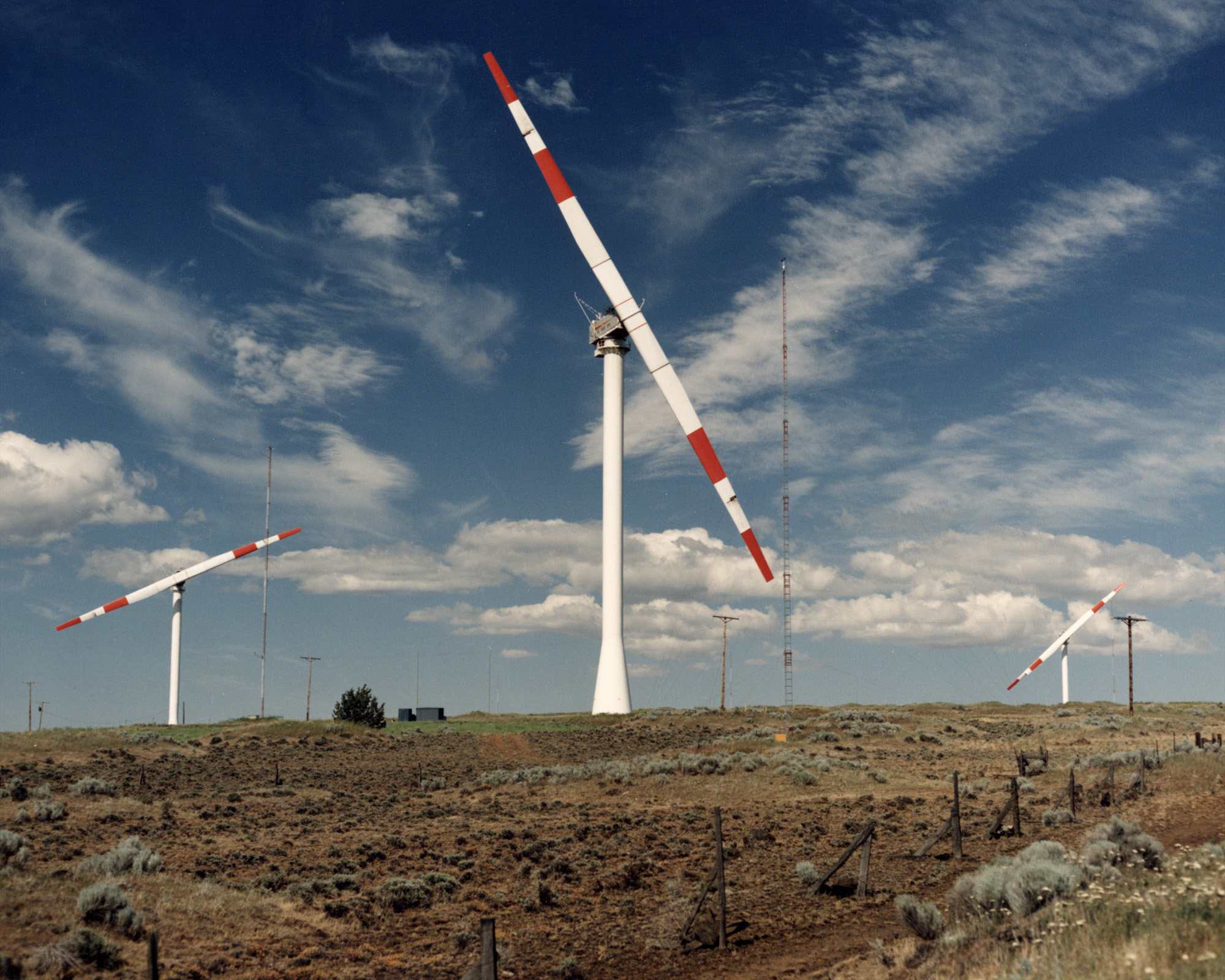
Mod-2 (2.5 MW wind turbine cluster in Goodnoe Hills, Washington)

=== NASA research and development ===
In 1973, the Middle East oil embargo escalated interest in wind energy technology development. From 1974 - 1981, the NASA Glenn Research Center, formerly the Lewis Research Center in Cleveland, Ohio, initiated a US wind energy program for the development of utility-scale horizontal-axis wind turbines.

A 1975 National Science Foundation (NSF) contract provided Glidden Doman with funding to explore wind turbine structural dynamics with the objective to eliminate the possibility of wind turbine blade failures due to turbulence. Boeing's MOD-2 with the Doman-conceived flexible design, two-bladed wind turbine with a teeter hinge, became a flagship achievement in this 7-year NASA managed wind energy program for the U.S. Department of Energy and the U.S. Department of the Interior.

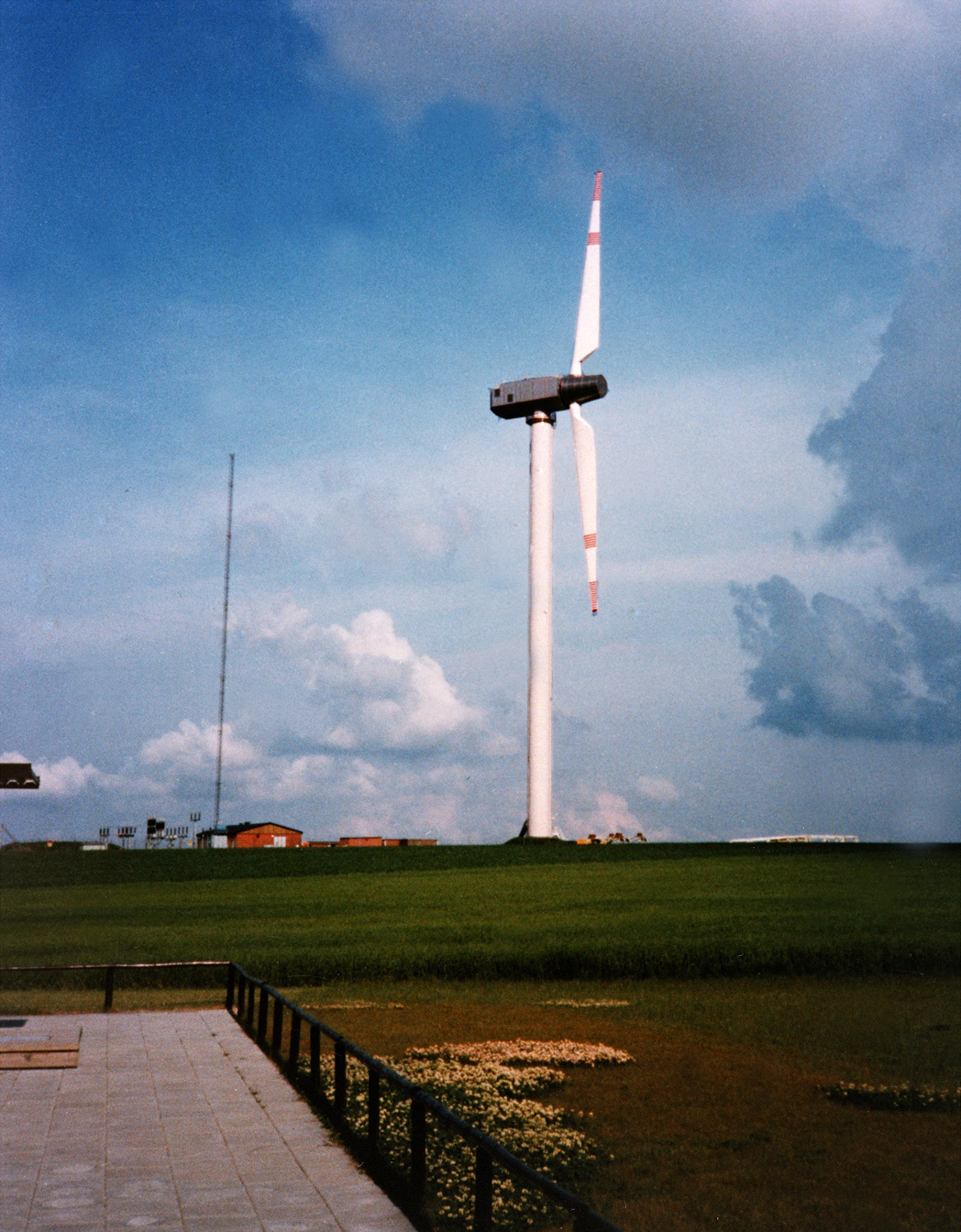
WTS-4 (4.2 MW wind turbine in Medecine Bow, Wyoming. This turbine held the world power output record for over 20 years)

=== Two-bladed wind turbines ===
==== Hamilton Standard ====
In 1978, Glidden Doman was hired by Hamilton Standard (now a United Technologies Corporation company) to design wind turbines. In 1982, Hamilton Standard installed the WTS-4, a 4.2 MW two-bladed wind turbine with a teetering hub, soft steel tower, and pitch power control in Medecine Bow, Wyoming. In 1983, the Karlskronavarvet shipyard installed the WTS-3, a 3 MW two-bladed, downwind design wind turbine in Maglarp, Sweden. The WTS-3 design, which was developed in cooperation with US based Hamilton Standard, also featured a soft steel tower that has become the standard for multi-MW wind turbines.

To this day, the WTS-4 is the most powerful wind turbine to have operated onshore in the US and it held the world record for power output for over 20 years. Toward the end of this project, NASA provided Doman with funding to explore broad range variable speed on the WTS-4. The outcome of Doman's work was a strong patent in his name and the conclusion that such a variable speed system (i.e. the Gamma turbine) should be developed.

After an extensive due diligence review, Enel (Italy's largest utility) and Aeritalia bought a license from United Technologies and moved Doman to Italy where the Gamma 60 technology was designed and demonstrated under Wind Energy Systems Taranto SpA (WEST).

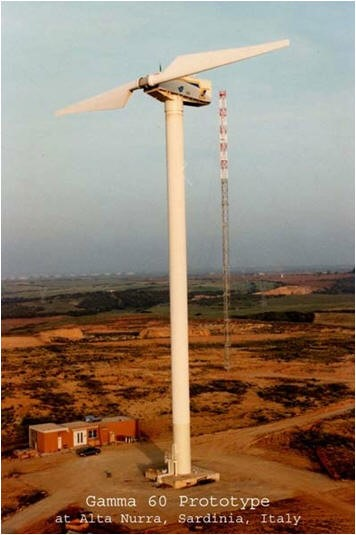
Gamma 60 (1.5 MW in Alta Nurra, Sardinia, Italy)

==== Gamma 60 ====
Gamma, the Italian acronym for WEST's (Wind Energy Systems Taranto SpA) project - "Advanced Multi Megawatt Wind Generator", began in 1987 and explored all available technology to create a turbine design optimized for economic performance. Gamma's technology is based on Doman's design philosophy of compliance with the forces of nature in its flexible tower, teetered hub, low-modulus blade material, and broad-range variable-speed power train rather than resistance to these forces which is prevalent in 3-bladed Danish turbine designs.

Doman's work was further inspired by German aerospace engineer Kurt Hohenemser who declared that wind turbines should be two-bladed, fixed pitch, and controlled by yawing to achieve the highest reliability. Dr. Hohenemser, along with his mentor Anton Flettner, developed helicopters for the U.S. military after being among the first German immigrants in the United States after World War II.

The 1.5 MW Gamma 60 horizontal-axis wind turbine began operations at Alta Nurra, Sardinia, Italy in 1992. Power from the Gamma 60 turbine is controlled by yawing the rotor, a maneuver made possible by the load alleviation resulting from the soft-system design. Features including the teeter hinge that eliminate major vibratory loading, allow a Gamma system to be very lightweight and longer lived than its competitors. Broad range variable speed allows the Gamma 60 wind turbine to operate at rotational speeds proportional to the wind speed. This allows the Gamma turbine to be very quiet when the wind is moderate and to run faster under high wind conditions. The Gamma 60 wind turbine operated successfully in Sardinia, Italy from 1992 – 1997.

Doman successfully replicated the benefits associated with the four-bladed helicopter rotor with a gimbal hinge, while also recognizing advantages inherent in two-bladed helicopter rotors, in the development of the Gamma 60 two-bladed rotor with a teetering hinge. The Gamma 60 was the world's first variable speed wind turbine with a teeter hinge.

In 1997, Italian nuclear mechanical engineer Silvestro Caruso, who was assigned by Finmeccanica (now Leonardo S.p.A.) for an independent review of the Gamma 60 turbine, concludes that Gamma technology has great potential. Commercialization of the Gamma 60 prototype was planned, including a conditional investment for 10 Gamma turbines by a US utility, but legal disputes and contractual claims between WEST and Enel, the privatization of Enel, and tumbling oil prices in 1998 resulted in the program's cancellation. These factors created the opportunity for Doman, Caruso, and the other shareholders to launch a new company. In 2004, Gamma Ventures, Inc was formed by Glidden Doman and Silvestro Caruso after the company acquired two yet to be completed 2 MW Gamma turbines and the technology rights from the successful Italian Gamma venture.

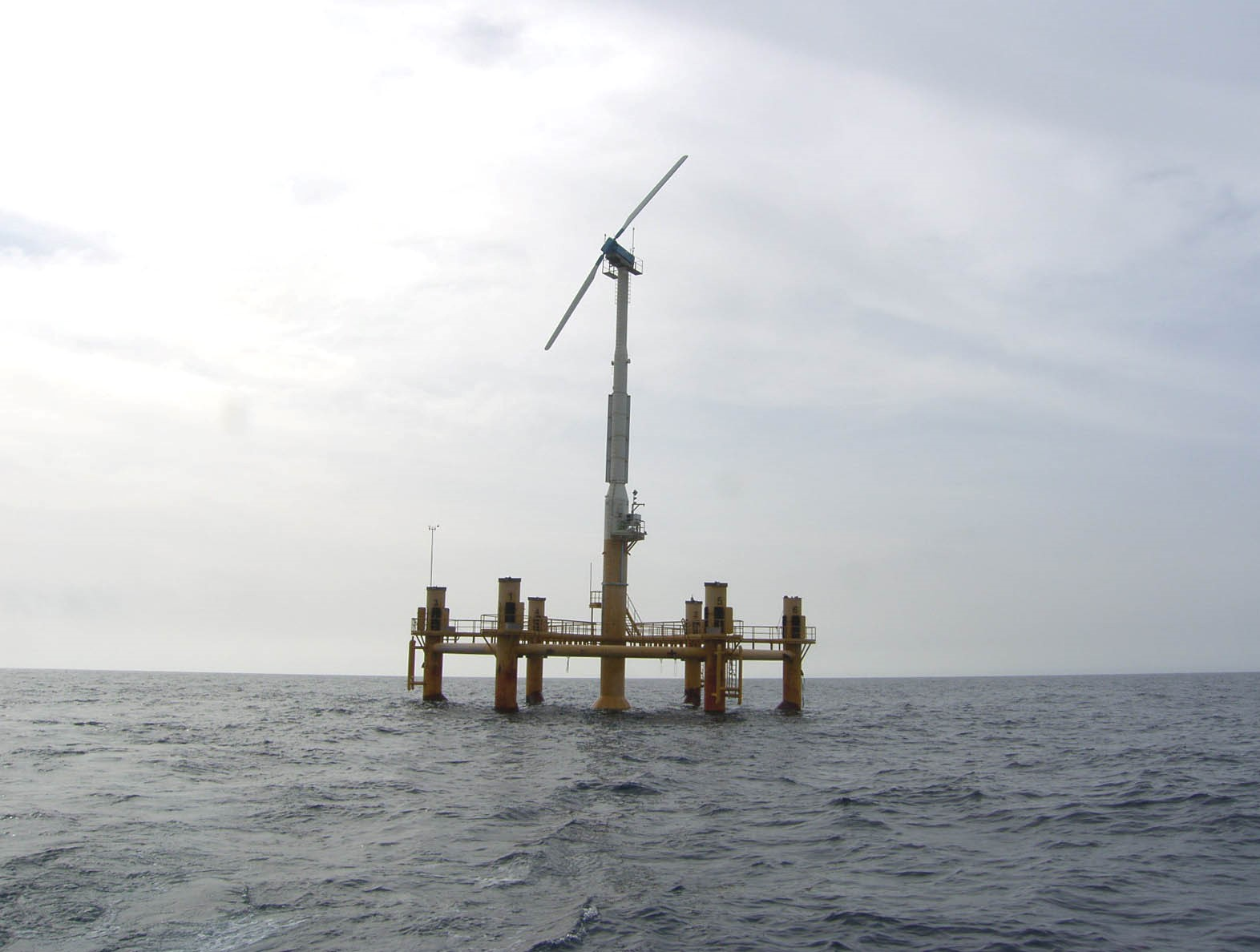
Blue H Technologies - World's first floating wind turbine

=== Floating wind turbines ===
In 2004, Martin Jakubowski founded Blue H Technologies B.V. to develop floating wind turbines. Sky Saver Srl, the Italian subsidiary of Blue H Technologies, files for a grant and permission to install a two-bladed wind turbine on a floating tension-leg platform (TLP) off the coast of Southern Italy in the Strait of Otranto.

In December 2007, Blue H Technologies deployed the world's first floating wind turbine, 21.3 kilometers (13.2 miles) off the coast of Apulia, Italy. The prototype was installed in waters 113 meters (371 ft) deep in order to gather test data on wind and sea conditions, and was decommissioned at the end of 2008. The turbine utilized a tension-leg platform design and a two-bladed turbine.

In 2007, Blue H Technologies acquired the Gamma 60 turbine and manufacturing rights from Gamma Ventures, Inc.

In January 2009, the Energy Technologies Institute (ETI) invested £3.3m in Project Deep Water to examine the economic and technical feasibility of a tension-leg platform design using a two-bladed teeter hinge 5 MW floating wind turbine with hybrid concrete/steel floater and concrete counter weight. This project, which was led by Blue Technologies, included BAE Systems, Romax, CEFAS, EDF Energy, PAFA Consulting Engineers and Sea & Land Power, and Energy Ltd. Project Deep Water determined that two-bladed teetered turbines with tension-leg platforms could help reduce the costs of offshore wind in the UK and helped shape the next stage of ETI's Offshore Wind program.

In May 2010, Blue H USA LLC, the US affiliate of Blue H Technologies B.V., secured the first permit in North America for a full-scale floating deep water offshore wind energy platform (United States Army Corps of Engineers Permit Number: NAE-2007-02626).

In 2010, Blue H Technologies shareholders decline funding for additional development of the two-bladed floating offshore wind turbine. Martin Jakubowski and Silvestro Caruso, with support from Gamma Ventures, Inc, establish Condor Wind Energy Ltd after acquiring all relevant assets from Blue H to further develop its proprietary two-bladed teetering hinge offshore wind energy technology.

In 2014, Condor Wind Energy Ltd operations decline after internal differences.

== Seawind Ocean Technology corporate structure ==
In 2014, Martin Jakubowski and Silvestro Caruso established Seawind Ocean Technology B.V. in The Netherlands. In 2015, Seawind Ocean Technology signed an agreement to buy back all assets of Condor Wind Energy Ltd, including most importantly, all technological and intellectual property. In 2017, all shareholders of Gamma Ventures, Inc became shareholders of Seawind Ocean Technology Holding B.V.

In 2019, Seawind Ocean Technology Ltd was created in the UK to develop a British legal entity to support the growing offshore wind industry in UK waters.

In December 2019, Seawind's 6.2 MW and 12.2 MW two-bladed floating wind turbines receive ‘Technology Qualification’ status from DNV GL. DNV GL has agreed to an accelerated schedule resulting in Type A certification for the Seawind 6.2 MW wind turbine in 2025 and the Seawind 12.2 MW turbine in 2026.

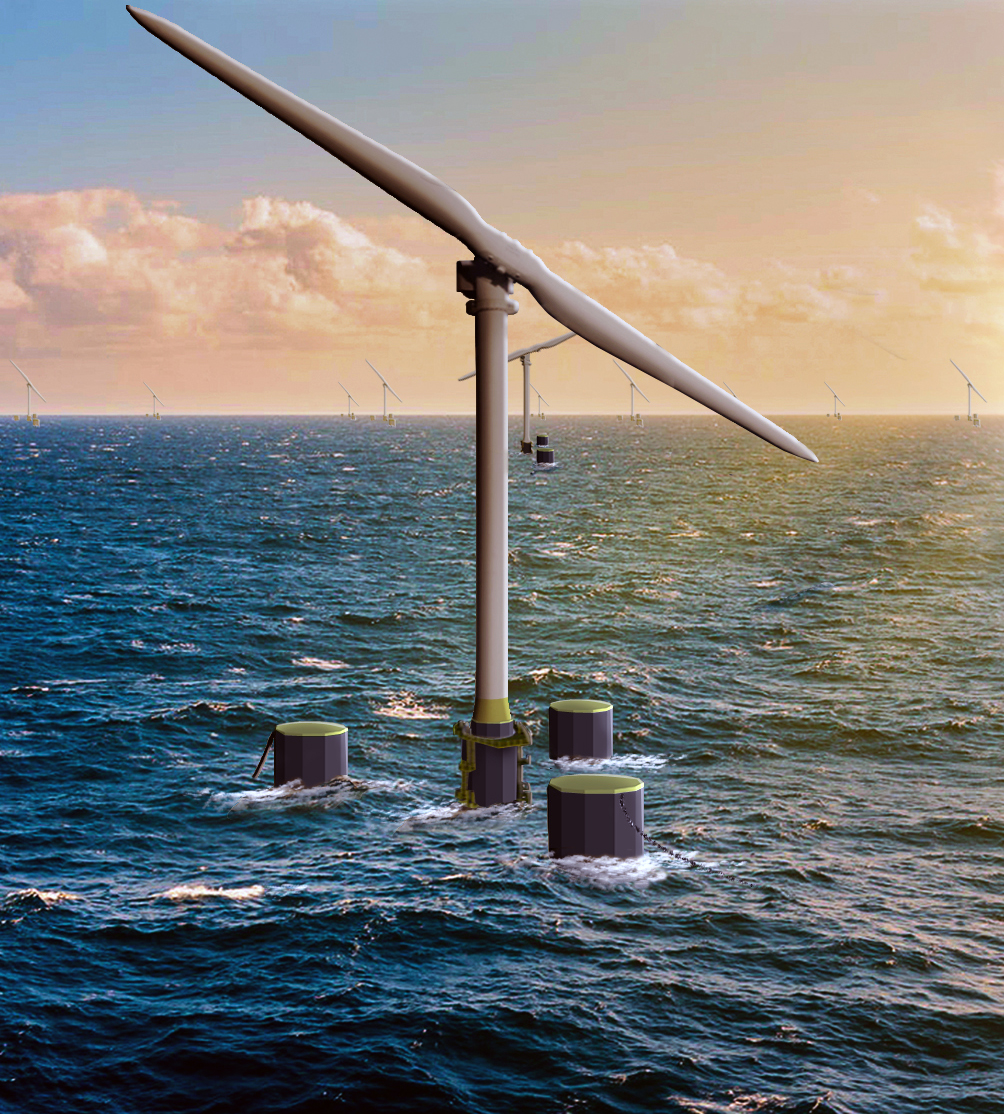
Seawind's Integrated Turbine, Tower, & Substructure

== Seawind Ocean Technology offshore wind turbines ==
=== Seawind 6-126 ===
The Seawind 6-126 wind turbine is a lightweight offshore two-bladed upwind configuration with a teeter hub and active yaw control. Its nacelle is reinforced with rafters, like a ship's hull, and is linked to a central circular-shape helicopter landing deck that can accommodate large twin-engine-helicopters. Seawind's two-bladed teeter hub, which rigidly attaches the two blades to a flexible structure with limited pivoting capability, provides stability and reduces overall system fatigue.

Seawind's teetering hinge introduces an additional degree of freedom to the running rotor (blades and hub). This degree of freedom, decoupling the rotor from the drivetrain, greatly reduces the aerodynamic cyclic loads transferred by the rotor to the drivetrain and greatly reduces the torque necessary to yaw the nacelle around the tower axis. Therefore, Seawind's turbine design can eliminate all blade pitch control mechanisms with its yaw power control system.

Target markets for the Seawind 6-126 include hurricane-prone regions and remote islands.

=== Seawind 12-225 ===
The Seawind 12-225 wind turbine is a lightweight offshore two-bladed upwind configuration with a teeter hub and active yaw control that has a turbine head mass 203 tons lower than its nearest comparable competitor. Power converters, MV-transformers, and switchgears for the Seawind 6-126 and Seawind 12-225 offshore wind turbines are placed inside the integrated support structure base below water level. This design supports service accessibility, passive seawater cooling, reduces vibration-related power electronics risks, and decreases nacelle mass. The Seawind 12-225 and Seawind 6-126 offshore wind turbine sister models were developed for a design life of more than 25 years.

Seawind's two-bladed offshore wind turbine with teetering hinge is designed to survive hurricane conditions. In the case of extreme wind speeds, Seawind's two-bladed rotor can be positioned horizontally with the blades aligned with the direction of the wind. This configuration, with the flexibility provided by the elastic hinge, is effective to reduce the wind loads on the blades and other components. In extreme wind conditions, the loads are only slightly higher than the maximum loads in normal operations.

Target markets for the Seawind 12-225 include high-wind projects in Europe and the US.

=== Offshore wind turbine specifications ===
Turbine name	Rated capacity (MW)	Rotor diameter (m)	Rotor speed (rpm)(*)	Tip speed (m/s)	Water depth (m)	Operating wind speed	Cyclone withstanding	Projected market launch
Seawind 6-126	6.2	126	20.8	137	Beyond 50	3.5 – 25 m/s (12.5 – 90 km/h)	up to 70 m/s (250 km/h) with 90 m/s (325 km/h) gusts	2025
Seawind 12-225	12.2	225	11.8	139	Beyond 50	3.5 – 25 m/s (12.5 – 90 km/h)	To be determined	2026

(*) At rated power

== See also ==
- Glidden Doman
- Gamma 60 wind turbine
- NASA wind turbines
- Floating wind turbine
- Anton Flettner
- Kurt Hohenemser
- Variable speed wind turbine
- Offshore wind power
