= Olympus tension leg platform =

Coordinates: 28.159886°N 89.239128°W

Olympus is a tension leg platform oil rig, planned as a further development of the Mars field (hence "Mars B").

== Design ==
Olympus is a Tension Leg Platform, with 24 wells; added to Mars A, this means a combined 48 wells and more than 350,000 barrels (56,000 cubic metres) per day of oil equivalent capacity.

The body of the platform was fabricated in South Korea, then transported to Texas on the MV Blue Marlin, arriving in January 2013, to be fitted with topside equipment made by Kiewit Offshore Services.

== Project ==
Shell owns 71.5% of the project; BP owns 28.5%. It was originally expected to become operational in 2015 but first oil production safely occurred as quickly as early February 2014. The platform is moored about 130 miles south of New Orleans, and was planned to extract oil from eight Mississippi Canyon blocks: 762, 763, 764, 805, 806, 807, 850 and 851.

Wells are being drilled by the Noble Bully 1. Production is expected to start in 2014.

In February 2026, the broader Mars field development, which incorporated both the original Mars platform and the Olympus platform "Mars B", surpassed a milestone of one billion barrels of oil produced. This milestone marked three decades of deep water production since operations began in 1996.

== See also ==
- Offshore oil and gas in the US Gulf of Mexico
- Mars (oil platform)
