= Safety culture =

Risk-averse attitudes

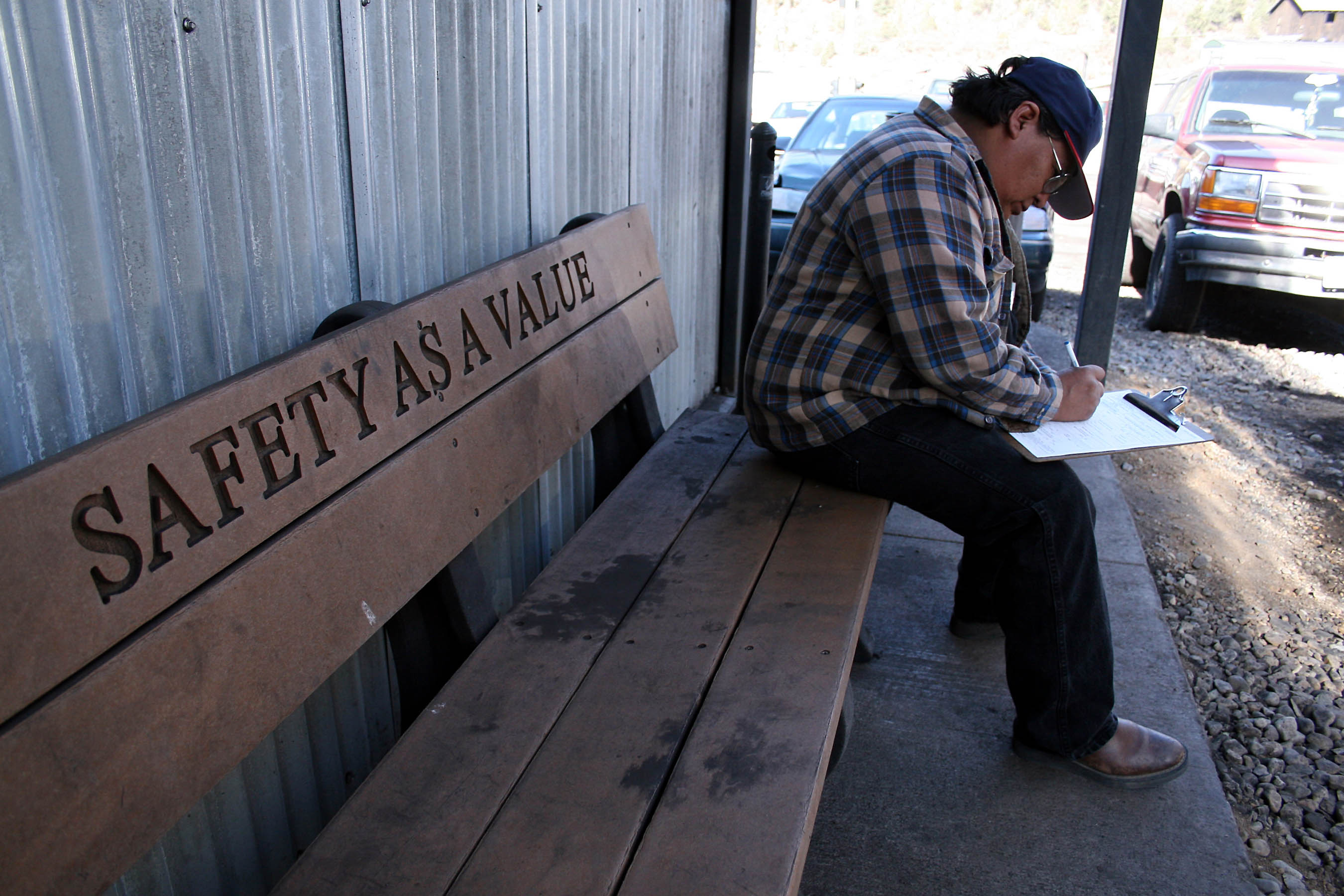
"Safety as a value" inscribed on a bench at a coal mine in Colorado

Safety culture is the element of organizational culture which is concerned with the maintenance of safety and compliance with safety standards. It is informed by the organization's leadership and the beliefs, perceptions and values that employees share in relation to risks within the organization, workplace or community. Safety culture has been described in a variety of ways: notably, the National Academies of Science and the Association of Land Grant and Public Universities have published summaries on this topic in 2014 and 2016.

A good safety culture can be promoted by senior management commitment to safety, realistic practices for handling hazards, continuous organisational learning, and care and concern for hazards shared across the workforce. Beyond organisational learning, individual training forms the foundation from which to build a systemic safety culture.

== History ==
The Chernobyl disaster highlighted the importance of safety culture and the effect of managerial and human factors on safety performance. The term "safety culture" was first used in INSAG's (1986) "Summary Report on the Post-Accident Review Meeting on the Chernobyl Accident", where safety culture was described as:

"That assembly of characteristics and attitudes in organizations and individuals which establishes that, as an overriding priority, nuclear plant safety issues receive the attention warranted by their significance."

Since then, a number of definitions of safety culture have been published. The U.K. Health and Safety Commission developed one of the most commonly used definitions of safety culture: "The product of individual and group values, attitudes, perceptions, competencies, and patterns of behaviour that determine the commitment to, and the style and proficiency of, an organisation's health and safety management". "Organisations with a positive safety culture are characterized by communications founded on mutual trust, by shared perceptions of the importance of safety and by confidence in the efficacy of preventive measures."

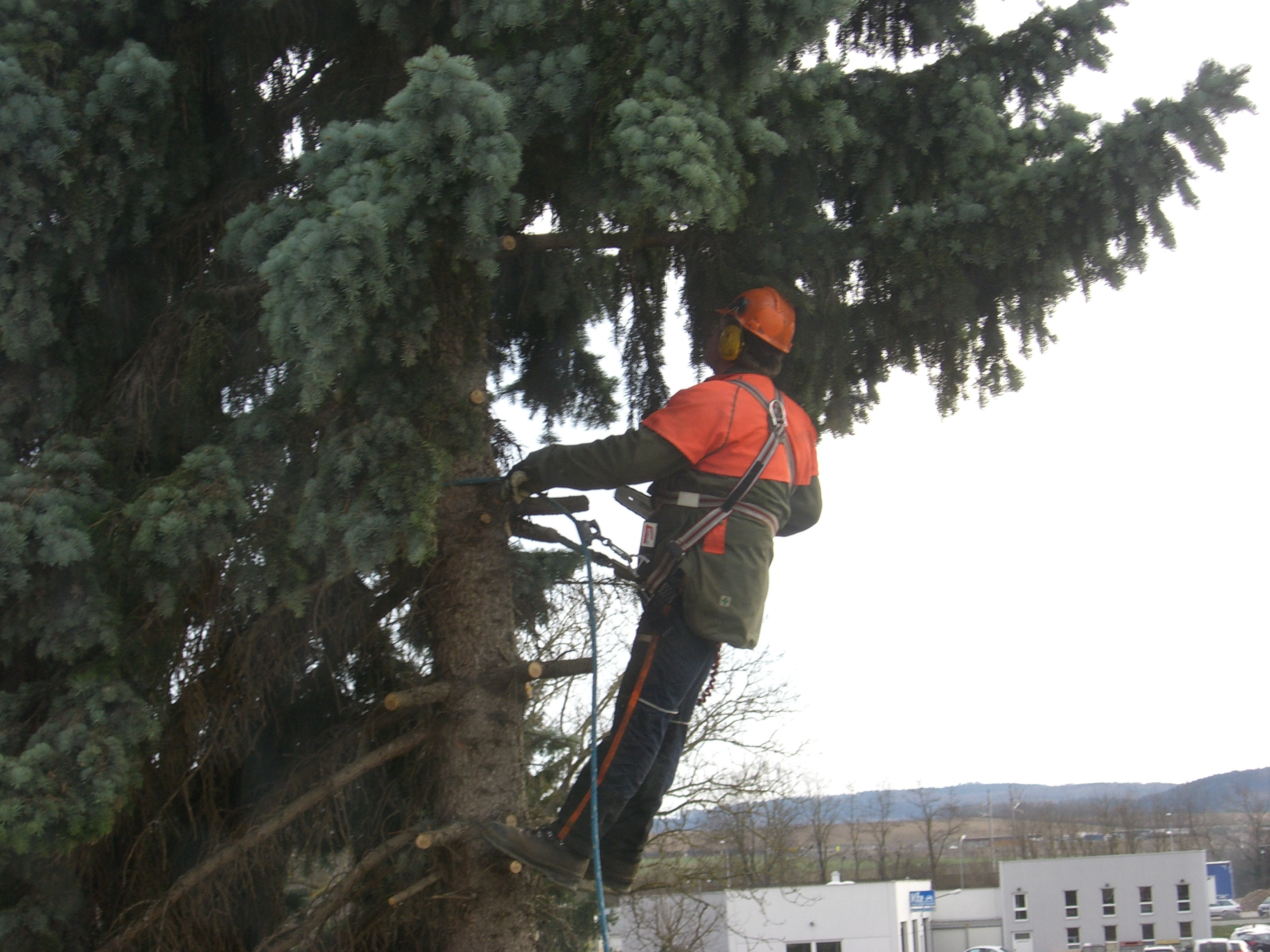
Doing a job with inadequate safety equipment may indicate a poor safety culture.

The Cullen Report into the Ladbroke Grove rail crash saw safety culture as "the way we typically do things around here"; this would imply that every organisation has a safety culture – just some a better one than others. The concept of 'safety culture' originally arose in connection with major organisational accidents, where it provides a crucial insight into how multiple organisational barriers against such accidents can be simultaneously ineffective: "With each disaster that occurs our knowledge of the factors which make organisations vulnerable to failures has grown. It has become clear that such vulnerability does not originate from just 'human error', chance environmental factors or technological failures alone. Rather, it is the ingrained organisational policies and standards which have repeatedly been shown to predate the catastrophe."

The safety culture of an organization cannot be created or changed overnight; it develops over time as a result of history, work environment, the workforce, health and safety practices, and management leadership: "Organizations, like organisms, adapt". An organization's safety culture is ultimately reflected in the way safety is addressed in its workplaces (whether boardroom or shopfloor). In reality an organization's safety management system is not a set of policies and procedures on a bookshelf, but how those policies and procedures are implemented into the workplace, which will be influenced by the safety culture of the organization or workplace. The UK HSE notes that safety culture is not just (nor even most significantly) an issue of shopfloor worker attitudes and behaviours "Many companies talk about 'safety culture' when referring to the inclination of their employees to comply with rules or act safety or unsafely. However we find that the culture and style of management is even more significant, for example a natural, unconscious bias for production over safety, or a tendency to focussing on the short-term and being highly reactive."

Since the 1980s, a large amount of safety culture research has left the concept largely ill-defined. Within the literature there are a number of varying definitions of safety culture with arguments for and against the concept. Two of the most prominent and most-commonly used definitions are those given above from the International Atomic Energy Agency (IAEA) and from the UK Health and Safety Commission (HSC). However, there are some common characteristics shared by other definitions. Some characteristics associated with safety culture include the incorporation of beliefs, values and attitudes. A critical feature of safety culture is that it is shared by a group. Creating such a culture in new domains can be especially challenging.

When defining safety culture some authors focus on attitudes, where others see safety culture being expressed through behaviours and activities. The safety culture of an organization can be a critical influence on human performance in safety-related tasks and hence on the safety performance of the organization. Many proprietary and academic methods claim to assess safety culture, but few have been validated against actual safety performance. The vast majority of surveys examine key issues such as leadership, involvement, commitment, communication, and incident reporting. Some safety culture maturity tools are used in focus group exercises, though few of these (even the most popular) have been examined against company incident rates.

== Broken safety cultures ==
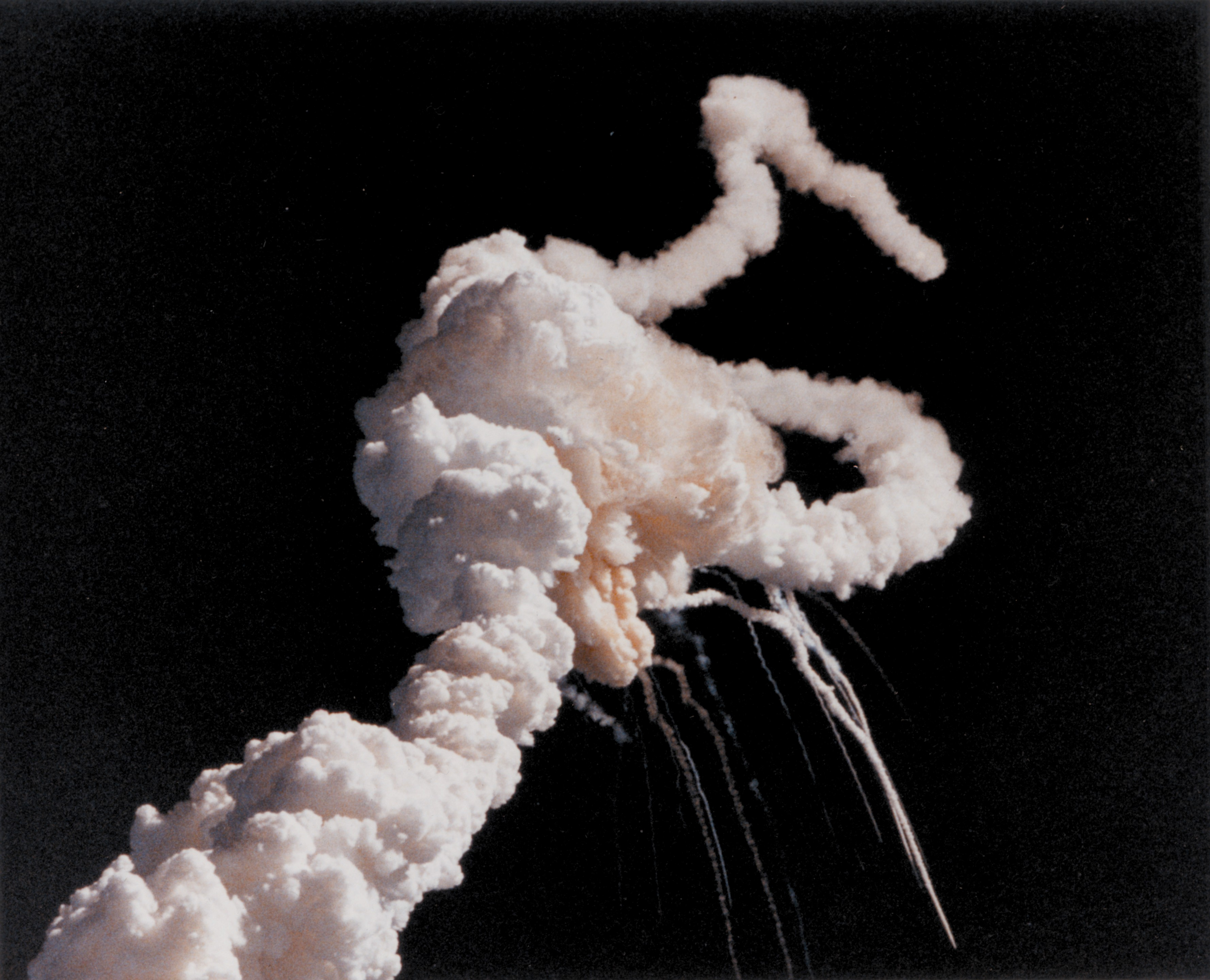
The first obvious sign of a poor safety culture may be a major accident e.g. the Challenger explosion.

Although there is some uncertainty and ambiguity in defining safety culture, there is no uncertainty over the relevance or significance of the concept. Mearns et al. stated that "safety culture is an important concept that forms the environment within which individual safety attitudes develop and persist and safety behaviours are promoted". With every major disaster, considerable resources are allocated to identify factors that might have contributed to the outcome of the event. Consideration of the considerable detail revealed by inquiries into such disasters is invaluable in identifying generic factors that "make organisations vulnerable to failures". From such inquiries, a pattern emerges; organizational accidents are not a result of randomly coinciding "operator error" or chance environmental or technical failures alone. Rather, the disasters are a result of a breakdown in the organization's policies and procedures that were established to deal with safety, and the breakdown flows from inadequate attention being paid to safety issues. In the UK, investigations into incidents such as the sinking of the Herald of Free Enterprise passenger ferry (Sheen, 1987), the Kings Cross underground station fire (1987) and the Piper Alpha oil platform explosion (1988) raised awareness of the effect of organisational, managerial and human factors on safety outcomes, and the decisive effect of 'safety culture' on those factors. In the US, similar issues were found to underlie the Space Shuttle Challenger disaster, subsequent investigation of which identified that cultural issues had influenced numerous "flawed" decisions on behalf of NASA and Thiokol management that had contributed to the disaster. The lesson drawn from the UK disasters was that, "It is essential to create a corporate atmosphere or culture in which safety is understood to be and is accepted as, the number one priority."

From public enquiries it has become evident that a broken safety culture is responsible for many of the major process safety disasters that have taken place around the world over the past 20 years or so. Typical features related to these disasters are where there had been a culture of:

- "Profit before safety", where productivity always came before safety, as safety was viewed as a cost, not an investment.
- "Fear", so that problems remained hidden as they are driven underground by those trying to avoid sanctions or reprimands.
- "Ineffective leadership", where blinkered leadership and the prevailing corporate culture prevented the recognition of risks and opportunities leading to wrong safety decisions being made at the wrong time, for the wrong reasons.
- "Non-compliance" to standards, rules and procedures by managers and the workforce.
- "Miscommunication", where critical safety information had not been relayed to decision-makers and/ or the message had been diluted.
- "Competency failures", where there were false expectations that direct hires and contractors were highly trained and competent.
- "Ignoring lessons learned", where safety critical information was not extracted, shared or enforced.

"Tough guy" attributes like unwillingness to admit ignorance, admit mistakes, or ask for help can undermine safety culture and productivity by interfering with exchange of useful information. A Harvard Business School study found an intervention to improve the culture at Shell Oil during the construction of the Ursa tension leg platform contributed to increased productivity and an 84% lower accident rate. After a number of Korean Air crashes, and particularly after the Korean Air Cargo Flight 8509 crash, a December 1999 review found that a culture of overly strong hierarchy (influenced in general Korean culture by Confucianism) prevented subordinates from speaking up in safety-critical situations. The airline's safety record later improved considerably.

== Ideal safety cultures ==
James Reason has suggested that safety culture consists of five elements:

- An informed culture.
- A reporting culture.
- A learning culture.
- A just culture.
- A flexible culture.

Reason considers an ideal safety culture "the 'engine' that drives the system towards the goal of sustaining the maximum resistance towards its operational hazards" regardless of current commercial concerns or leadership style. his requires a constant high level of respect for anything that might defeat safety systems and 'not forgetting to be afraid'. Complex systems with defence-in-depth (such as would be expected for a major hazard plant) become opaque to most if not all of their managers and operators. Their design should ensure that no single failure will lead to an accident, or even to a revealed near-miss, and there are no timely reminders to be afraid. For such systems, Reason argues, there is an 'absence of sufficient accidents to steer by' and the desired state of 'intelligent and respectful wariness' will be lost unless sustained by the collection, analysis and dissemination of knowledge from incidents and revealed near misses. It is very dangerous to think that an organization is safe because no information is saying otherwise, but it is also very easy. An organisation that underestimates danger will be insufficiently concerned about poor working conditions, poor working practices, poor equipment reliability, and even identified deficiencies in the defences-in-depth: the plant is still safe 'by massive margins', so why rock the boat? Hence, without conscious efforts to prevent it, complex systems with major hazards are both particularly vulnerable to (and particularly prone to develop) a poor safety culture.

E. Scott Geller has written of a "total safety culture" (TSC) achieved through implementing applied behavioral techniques.

The importance of considering supply chains or supply networks in establishing a safety culture has been addressed by the Business Leaders' Health and Safety Forum in New Zealand and CSR Europe's Portal for Responsible Supply Chain Management. Rob Handfield notes an example of the role of BP's procurement team in sourcing vendors and placing orders to respond to the Deepwater Horizon oil spill in 2010, commenting that the company's supply chain team "[did] everything that is humanly possible to stop the oil, and clean up the mess".

== Accidents ==
Over the years, a lot of attention has focused on the causes of occupational incidents. When incidents occur in the workplace it is important to understand what factors (human, technical, organizational) may have contributed to the outcome in order to avoid similar incidents in the future. Through developing an understanding of why and how incidents occur, appropriate methods for incident prevention can be developed (Williamson and Feyer 2002). In the past, improvement in workplace safety or in the control of workplace risks has come about through the provision of safer machinery or processes, the better training of employees, and the introduction of formal safety management systems. Consequently, (some argue) in a workplace that has benefited from these improvements, many of the residual workplace accidents result from operator error — one or more operators doing a job differently from the safe way they were trained to. Hence, there is now a move to apply the concept of safety culture at the individual level; worker behaviour is influenced by the safety culture of an organization, so safety culture could affect the worker injury rate. Although the overall culture of an organization may affect the behaviour of employees, much research has focused on the effect of more localised factors (i.e. supervisors, interpretation of safety policies) in the specific culture of individual workplaces, leading to the concept of a "Local safety climate, which is more susceptible to transition and change". This would also suggest that safety climate operates on a different level than safety culture. Mearns et al. note that although safety culture was a concept originally used to describe the inadequacies of safety management that result in major disasters, that the concept is now being applied to explain accidents at the individual level, although as they emphasize, "The validity of the safety culture concept with regard to individual accidents is yet to be ascertained." (p. 643).

Pidgeon and O'Leary argue that "a 'good' safety culture might reflect and be promoted by four factors

- Senior management commitment to safety
- Realistic and flexible customs and practices for handling both well-defined and ill-defined hazards
- continuous organisational learning through practices such as feedback systems, monitoring, and analysis
- Care and concern for hazards shared across the workforce

Only two of those factors fall within a management system, and leadership as well as management is necessary.

Several papers (e.g., for the UK offshore oil industry, Mearns et al. (2000)) have sought to identify specific safety management practices that predict (conventional) safety performance. Shannon (1998) gives details of many reported surveys in Canada and the US and reports the conclusions of Shannon et al. (1997). reviewing them. Variables consistently related to lower injury rates included both those specified by a safety management system and purely cultural factors.

'Safety Management' factors	Cultural/social factors
delegation of safety activities	(more general) empowerment of the workforce
conduct of safety audits	good relations between management and workers
monitoring of unsafe worker behaviors	encouragement of a long-term commitment of the work force
safety training - initial and continuing	low turnover and longer seniority
good housekeeping	active role of top management

Recently, some evidence showed that regional subculture has its own contribution to safety culture. Therefore, considering subculture values as predictors will be helpful to improve safety culture.

Furthermore, the culture of safety has a bearing on traffic safety. Research has shown a notable negative correlation between safety culture and the frequency of self-reported accidents.

== Process safety management ==
Control of major accident hazards requires a specific focus on process-safety management over and above conventional safety management, and Anderson (2004) has expressed concern at the implications for management of major hazards of the extension of the "safety culture" concept to justify behavioural safety initiatives to reduce injury (or lost-time accident) rates by improving safety culture. He argues that "loss of containment" rates on major hazard sites give a good indication of how well the major accident risks are managed; UK studies show no significant correlation with "lost time accident" rates. Furthermore, behavioural safety has come to be targeted on reducing the propensity for error of front line staff by getting them to be more careful; UK studies have shown that the vast majority of frontline errors are not free-standing, but are triggered by preceding errors by more senior grades. (In a study of over 700 loss-of-containment events in the 1990s - of 110 incidents due to maintenance, only 17 were due to a failure to ensure that planned maintenance procedures were followed: 93 were due to a failure by the organisation to provide adequate maintenance procedures. Under 6% of incidents were due to front-line personnel deliberately not following procedures.). There can be no objection to behavioural safety initiatives to reduce the rate of lost-time accidents, provided that they do not divert effort from the management of major hazards and that a low lost-time accident rate does not give rise to unwarranted complacency about the major hazard.

== Establishment ==
Building and maintaining a durable, effective safety culture is a conscious, intentional process that requires successfully completing several steps. These include:

1. Articulate Values. It's essential that top leadership state and reinforce these values.
2. Establish Expected Behaviors. This includes setting policies and procedures regarding how activities are to be conducted. It also involves building systems and structures such as human resources practices and supports to maintain mission integrity so the organization stays within its core competencies. This also requires maintaining an integrated safety culture that balances individual judgement and rules-based safety.
3. Establish Expected Ways of Thinking. A systems thinking approach is important for comprehensively addressing the interacting factors that lead to safety incidents.
4. Invest Resources. Resources include sufficient time, funding equipment, staff and intra-organizational political support.
5. De-incentivize Undesired Behaviors. This means enforcing consequences for inappropriate safety actions.
6. Incentivize Desired Behaviors. Incentives include recognition, awards, and promoting social norms.
7. Seek Continuous Improvement. Use of a management method such as PDCA may be useful.

== Measurement ==
Questionnaires are used to assess safety culture. Due to differences of national and organizational cultures, as well as different approaches in studies and researches, many types of safety culture questionnaires have emerged. For example, in oil companies a safety culture questionnaire was developed in UK.

== See also ==
- High reliability organization – Organization successful in avoiding catastrophes where accidents are expected due to risk
- Human reliability – Factor in safety, ergonomics and system resilience
- Human factors and ergonomics
- Industrial and organizational psychology – Branch of psychology
- Just culture – Balanced accountability for both individuals and the organization
- Occupational health psychology – Health and Safety psychology
- Occupational safety and health – Field concerned with the safety, health and welfare of people at work
- Occupational hygiene – Management of workplace health hazards
- Occupational stress – Tensions related to work
- Organizational studies – Academic field
- Overconfidence – Personal cognitive bias
- World Association of Nuclear Operators – Not for profit, international organisation
