= Tension-leg platform =

Type of offshore platform used in production of oil or gas

A tension-leg platform (gray) under tow with seabed anchors (light gray) held up by cables (red) on left-hand side; platform with seabed anchors lowered and cables lightly tensioned on right-hand side

Tension leg platform (gray) free floating on left-hand side; structure is pulled by the tensioned cables (red) down towards the seabed anchors (light-gray) on right-hand side (very simplified, omitting details of temporary ballast transfers)

A tension-leg platform (TLP) or extended tension leg platform (ETLP) is a vertically moored floating structure normally used for the offshore production of oil or gas, and is particularly suited for water depths greater than 300 metres (about 1000 ft) and less than 1500 metres (about 4900 ft). Use of tension-leg platforms has also been proposed for offshore wind turbines.

The platform is permanently moored by means of tethers or tendons grouped at each of the structure's corners. A group of tethers is called a tension leg. A feature of the design of the tethers is that they have relatively high axial stiffness (low elasticity), such that virtually all vertical motion of the platform is eliminated. This allows the platform to have the production wellheads on deck (connected directly to the subsea wells by rigid risers), instead of on the seafloor. This allows a simpler well completion and gives better control over the production from the oil or gas reservoir, and easier access for downhole intervention operations.

TLPs have been in use since the early 1980s. The first tension leg platform was built for Conoco's Hutton field in the North Sea in the early 1980s. The hull was built in the dry-dock at Highland Fabricator's Nigg yard in the north of Scotland, with the deck section built nearby at McDermott's yard at Ardersier. The two parts were mated in the Moray Firth in 1984.

The Hutton TLP was originally designed for a service life of 25 years in North Sea depth of 100 to 1000 metres. It had 16 tension legs. Its weight varied between 46,500 and 55,000 tons when moored to the seabed, but up to 61,580 tons when floating freely. The total area of its living quarters was about 3,500 square metres and accommodated over 100 cabins though only 40 people were necessary to maintain the structure in place.

The hull of the Hutton TLP has been separated from the topsides. Topsides have been redeployed to the Prirazlomnoye field in the Barents Sea, while the hull was reportedly sold to a project in the Gulf of Mexico (although the hull has been moored in Cromarty Firth since 2009).

Larger TLPs will normally have a full drilling rig on the platform with which to drill and intervene on the wells. The smaller TLPs may have a workover rig, or with most recent TLPs, production wellheads located at remote drillcentres subsea.

The deepest (E)TLPs measured from the sea floor to the surface are:

- 5,185 ft (1,580 m) Big Foot ETLP
- 4,674 ft (1,425 m) Magnolia ETLP. Its total height is some 5,000 feet (1,500 m).
- 4,300 ft (1,300 m) Marco Polo TLP
- 4,250 ft (1,300 m) Neptune TLP
- 3,863 ft (1,177 m) Kizomba A TLP
- 3,800 ft (1,200 m) Ursa TLP. Its height above surface is 485 ft (148 m) making a total height of 4,285 ft (1,306 m).
- 3,350 ft (1,020 m) Allegheny TLP
- 3,300 ft (1,000 m) W. Seno A TLP

== Use for wind turbines ==
Although the Massachusetts Institute of Technology and the National Renewable Energy Laboratory explored the concept of TLPs for offshore wind turbines in September 2006, architects had studied the idea as early as 2003. Earlier offshore wind turbines cost more to produce, stood on towers dug deep into the ocean floor, were only possible in depths of at most 50 feet (15 m), and generated 1.5 megawatts for onshore units and 3.5 megawatts for conventional offshore setups. In contrast, TLP installation was calculated to cost a third as much. TLPs float, and researchers estimate they can operate in depths between 100 and 650 feet (200 m) and farther away from land, and they can generate 5.0 megawatts.

MIT and NREL researchers planned a half-scale prototype south of Cape Cod to prove the concept. Computer simulations project that in a hurricane TLPs would shift 0.9 m to 1.8 m and the turbine blades would cycle above wave peaks. Dampers could be used to reduce motion in the event of a natural disaster.

Blue H Technologies of the Netherlands deployed the world's first floating wind turbine on a tension-leg platform, 21.3 kilometres (13.2 mi) off the coast of Apulia, Italy in December 2007. The prototype was installed in waters 113 metres (371 ft) deep in order to gather test data on wind and sea conditions, and was decommissioned at the end of 2008. The turbine utilized a tension-leg platform design and a two-bladed turbine. Seawind Ocean Technology B.V., which was established by Martin Jakubowski and Silvestro Caruso (the founders of Blue H Technologies), acquired the proprietary rights to the two-bladed floating turbine technology developed by Blue H Technologies.

== In literature ==
A fictitious tension-leg platform anchored in the Gulf of Mexico is at the centre of the plot of the novel Seawitch (1977) by Alistair MacLean. At the time of publication there were no commercially active TLPs, and the plot involves a conspiracy to destroy Seawitch by competing oil companies. The prologue to the novel explains the principles of operation.

== See also ==
- Floating cable-stayed bridge
- Oil platform
- Magnolia (oil platform)
- Mars (oil platform)
- Olympus tension leg platform
- List of tallest structures
