= Mars (oil platform) =

Permanent offshore drilling and production tension-leg oil platform

Coordinates: 28°10′10.29″N 89°13′22.35″W

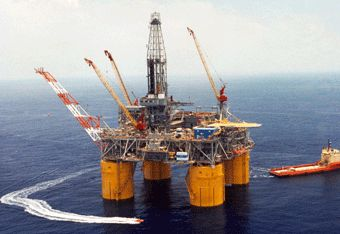
Mars Tension-leg Platform

Mars Tension-leg Platform showing damage from Hurricane Katrina (2005)

Mars is a permanent offshore drilling and production tension-leg oil platform (TLP) operating in Mississippi Canyon blocks 762, 763, 806, 807, 850 and 851 in the Gulf of Mexico and was approved by the MMS in December 1992 with production beginning on July 8, 1996. The leases were acquired by Shell in 1985 and 1988. The platform is a joint venture between Shell Oil Company and BP, with Shell owning the majority share and operating the facility.

Mars is positioned in a water depth of 896 m (2940 ft) and is designed to produce 220,000 barrels (35,000 m^{3}) of oil and 220 million cubic feet (6,200,000 m^{3}) of gas a day.

== Development and production ==
In October 1993, Shell announced plans to develop Mars utilizing an in-house designed and engineered TLP. The TLP was installed three years later in May at a water depth of 2,940 feet, making it the deepest TLP at the time as measured from its base on the seabed to the top of its tower. The Magnolia Tension-leg Platform has since surpassed the record set by Mars.

Ten of the TLP development wells were predrilled beginning in the fourth quarter of 1993 with the remaining wells drilled with a contract rig installed on the TLP after the facility was constructed and in position.

The oil produced is transported 116 miles via an 18/24-inch diameter pipeline to the Clovelly, LA area, and the gas is transported 55 miles via a 14-inch pipeline to West Delta 143. Both pipelines were installed as part of the Mars development.

== Hurricanes ==
In 2005, Mars was damaged when Hurricane Katrina hit the Gulf of Mexico but returned to production ahead of schedule in May 2006 and was producing slightly above its pre-Katrina rates in July 2006. Among the first-ever accomplishments were, most notably, the lift of the 1,000 ton damaged rig substructure, the repairs to both of the Mars product export pipelines in 2,000 feet of water and the mooring of the Safe Scandinavia in 3,000 foot water depth. The Mars recovery project encompassed more than one million man-hours without a recordable injury.

When Hurricane Ida hit in 2021, posts on social media circulated falsely claiming that the platform had broken loose.

== See also ==
- Offshore oil and gas in the Gulf of Mexico (United States)
- Olympus tension leg platform
