= Ursa tension leg platform =

Ursa Tension Leg Platform
- Interactive map of the Ursa Tension Leg Platform area

General information
- Status: Completed
- Type: Oil platform
- Location: 130 miles (210 km) southeast of New Orleans
- Coordinates: 28.154027°N 89.103553°W
- Opening: 2009
- Cost: $1.45 billion

Height
- Antenna spire: 1,306 m (4,285 ft)

Design and construction
- Developer: Shell 45.39% BP 22.69% ExxonMobil 15.96% ConocoPhillips 15.96%

The Ursa tension leg platform is an oil platform with a tension leg structure located at 28.154027°N 89.103553°W about 130 miles (210 km) southeast of New Orleans in the Gulf of Mexico. It is operated by Shell.

Shell is the operator of the project with 45.39%. BP has 22.69% while ExxonMobil and ConocoPhillips each have 15.96%.

The discovery well was drilled in 1991, with Sonat's Discoverer Seven Seas drillship, on Mississippi Canyon block 854. Construction was finished in 1998. It has a total height from the seabed to its top of 4,285 feet (1,306 m). At the time of completion, it was the tallest tension leg platform in the world. In 2009, Guinness World Records listed it as the tallest structure in the world, overtaking their 2007 pick of the Petronius Compliant Tower, at 640 m (2,100 ft). Although other types of oil platforms were much taller than either of them, even at the time. It was replaced as the tallest tension leg platform by the Magnolia Tension-leg Platform.

== See also ==
- List of tallest buildings and structures in the world
- Troll A platform
