= Magnolia (oil platform) =

Oil platform, and former tallest structure in the world

Coordinates: 27°12′13.86″N 92°12′09.36″W

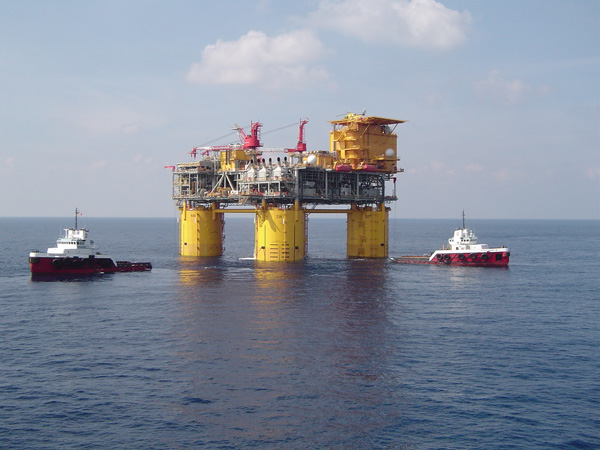
Magnolia oil platform

Magnolia is an offshore oil drilling and production Extended Tension Leg Platform in the Gulf of Mexico. It was the world's deepest ETLP, reaching 1,432 m (4,698 ft), beating the Marco Polo TLP by 120 m (390 ft). In March 2018, Big Foot ETLP took over this claim in 1,580 m (5,180 ft).

The hull consists of four circular columns connected at the bottom by rectangular pontoons. At the base of each column, a pontoon extends outward to support two tethers, which are connected to pile foundations on the seabed. The design capacity is an estimated daily production of 50,000 bbl (7,900 m^{3}) of oil and 150,000,000 cu ft (4,200,000 m^{3}) of natural gas.

The Magnolia field is located approximately 180 mi (290 km) south of Cameron, Louisiana, in Garden Banks blocks 783 and 784 in the Gulf of Mexico. It is located along the southern edge of the Titan Mini-Basin where multiple deep-water reservoir sands encounter a series of down-to-the-basin and antithetic faults adjacent to salt.

== See also ==
- Mars (oil platform)
- Gulf of Mexico
- Tension-leg platform
- Offshore oil and gas in the US Gulf of Mexico
- Oil platform
