= Just culture =

Balanced accountability for both individuals and the organization

Just culture is a concept related to systems thinking which emphasizes that mistakes are generally a product of faulty organizational cultures, rather than solely brought about by the person or persons directly involved. In a just culture, after an incident, the question asked is, "What went wrong?" rather than "Who caused the problem?". A just culture is the opposite of a blame culture. A just culture is not the same as a no-blame culture as individuals may still be held accountable for their misconduct or negligence.

A just culture helps create an environment where individuals feel free to report errors and help the organization to learn from mistakes. This is in contrast to a "blame culture" where individual persons are fired, fined, or otherwise punished for making mistakes, but where the root causes leading to the error are not investigated and corrected. In a blame culture mistakes may be not reported but rather hidden, leading ultimately to diminished organizational outcomes.

In a system of just culture, discipline is linked to inappropriate behavior, rather than harm. This allows for individual accountability and promotes a learning organization culture.

In this system, honest human mistakes are seen as a learning opportunity for the organization and its employees. The individual who made the mistake may be offered additional training and coaching. However, willful misconduct may result in disciplinary action such as termination of employment—even if no harm was caused.

Work on just culture has been applied to industrial, healthcare, aviation and other settings.

The first fully developed theory of a just culture was in James Reason's 1997 book, Managing the Risks of Organizational Accidents. In Reason's theory, a just culture is postulated to be one of the components of a safety culture. A just culture is required to build trust so that a reporting culture will occur. A reporting culture is where all safety incidents are reported so that learning can occur and safety improvements can be made. David Marx expanded the concept of just culture into healthcare in his 2001 report, Patient Safety and the "Just Culture": A Primer for Health Care Executives.
