= Wind power in the Netherlands =

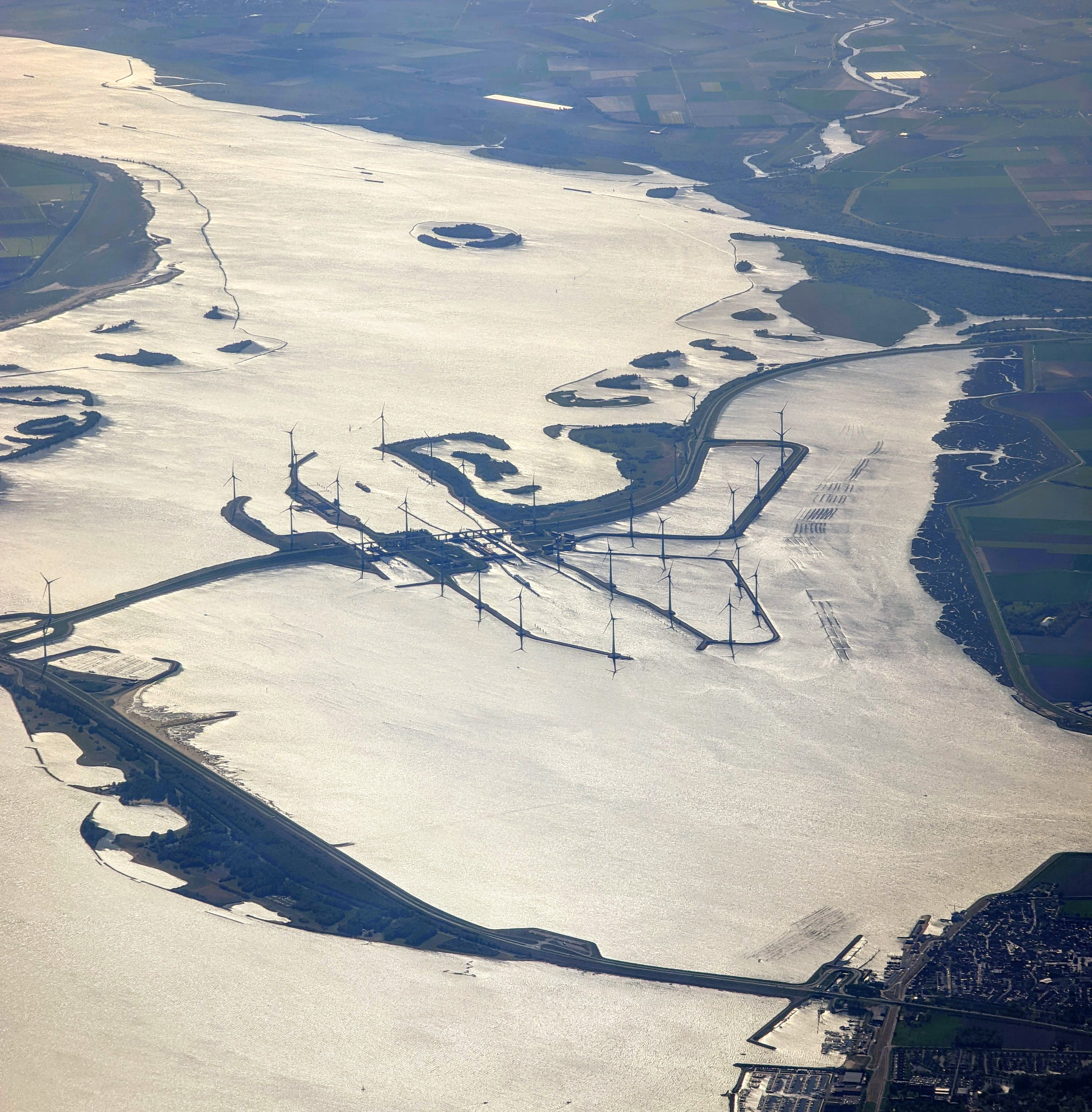
Aerial view of Windpark Krammer

As of January 2025, wind power in the Netherlands has an installed capacity of 11,714 MW, 40.5% of which is offshore. In 2022, the wind turbines provided the country with 18.37% of its electricity demand during the year. Windmills have historically played a major part in the Netherlands by providing an alternative to water driven mills.

In March 2022, the Dutch government announced that by 2030 offshore wind was to become the Netherlands' biggest power source, aiming at 21 GW of installed capacity.

Since 2015 there has been a trend towards the deployment and planning for large wind farms, both onshore and offshore, with a view to the approximate tripling wind power capacity from 2015 levels by 2023. The first of these, the 429 MW Noordoostpolder wind farm was already partially deployed by year end 2015 whilst the 600 MW Gemini offshore wind farm was commissioned in 2017. These newer and larger wind farms are making use of some of the largest wind turbines available, in particular in the case of Noordoostpolder the Enercon E-126 7500 kW wind turbine, the largest onshore turbine available at that time. The Netherlands is also well prepared for a significant rise in the production of intermittent power from wind energy by good interconnectors to its neighbours via high voltage cables enabling power to be imported or exported according to supply and demand. These include the 580 km NorNed submarine cable (700 MW) link to Norway, the 1,000 MW BritNed cable link to the United Kingdom and the COBRA cable link to Denmark (700 MW).

Many of the numerous smaller and older wind farms in the Netherlands consist of much smaller turbines compared to those typically deployed today. These were often manufactured by lesser known wind turbine manufacturers, sometimes producing innovative products such as the Nedwind 2 blade turbine. Many of these smaller companies were eventually acquired by the larger wind turbine manufactures such as Vestas, Siemens and Lagerwey.

== Installed capacity ==
Wind power installed capacity in MW

View chart definition.
Installed capacity by year (MW)
View chart definition.
Installed land-based wind capacity (MW) by province in 2022

Cumulative wind capacity in The Netherlands
Year	1990	1991	1992	1993	1994	1995	1996	1997	1998	1999
Installed capacity (MW)	50	83	101	131	152	250	296	324	363	410
Electricity generated (GWh)	56	88	137	173	221	314	435	489	571	642
% of electricity consumption	0.07	0.11	0.16	0.20	0.24	0.34	0.45	0.49	0.55	0.61
Capacity factor in percent (Note: Calculated value from total installed nameplate capacity and actual electricity generation. Statistical artifacts possible if new capacity was added late in the year)	12.79	12.10	15.48	15.08	16.60	14.34	16.78	17.23	17.96	17.88
Year	2000	2001	2002	2003	2004	2005	2006	2007	2008	2009
Sea-based capacity (MW)							108	108	228	228
Land-based capacity (MW)	447	485	672	905	1,075	1,224	1,453	1,641	1,921	1,994
Installed capacity (MW)	447	485	672	905	1,075	1,224	1,561	1,749	2,149	2,222
Electricity generated (GWh)	744	822	1,020	1,359	1,763	2,034	2,540	3,166	3,925	4,481
% of electricity consumption	0.69	0.74	0.91	1.19	1.50	1.72	2.11	2.58	3.18	3.78
Capacity factor in percent	19.00	19.35	17.33	17.14	18.72	18.97	18.57	20.66	20.85	23.02
Year	2010	2011	2012	2013	2014	2015	2016	2017	2018	2019
Sea-based capacity (MW)	228	228	228	228	228	357	957	957	957	957
Land-based capacity (MW)	2,009	2,088	2,205	2,485	2,637	3,034	3,300	3,245	3,436	3,527
Installed capacity (MW)	2,237	2,316	2,433	2,713	2,865	3,391	4,257	4,202	4,393	4,484
Electricity generated (GWh)	4,503	4,725	4,939	5,368	5,810	6,917	8,364	9,642	10,030	10,774
% of electricity consumption	3.69	3.84	4.10	4.47	4.92	5.81	6.97	7.98	8.22	8.82
Capacity factor in percent	22.98	23.29	23.17	22.59	23.15	23.29	22.43	26.19	26.06	27.43
Year	2020	2021	2022	2023	2024	2025	2026	2027	2028	2029
Sea-based capacity (MW)	2,460	2,460	2,570	4 110	4,748	4,748				
Land-based capacity (MW)	4,188	5,186	6,131	6 692	6,953	7 035				
Installed capacity (MW)	6,648	7,646	8,700	10,802	11,702	11 782				
Electricity generated (GWh)	13,949	18,998	21,404	26,983	32,201	33,526				
% of electricity consumption	11.54	15.52	18.25	23.26	26.92	27,64				
Capacity factor in percent	23.95	28.01	27.87	28.24	31.90					

== Past targets ==
The Dutch government set a target of 6,000 MW nameplate capacity of onshore wind power by 2020 and 4,450 MW of offshore wind power by 2023, neither of which were met. This would contribute towards the Dutch target of 14% renewable energy use out of total energy use by 2020 and 16% by 2023. In 2020 wind power provided 11.54% of Dutch electricity generation (see table above) while solar power provided an additional 7.25%, for a combined 18.79%

For offshore wind a new system of tendering is under development. New wind farm deployment is based on the SER agreement that describes a plan for five years of tendering 700 MW per year. Under this system the government chooses locations and organizes tenders for projects of 350 MW, and project developers can offer bids for each farm. These sites are also surveyed centrally by the government, allowing developers to avoid costly and multiple surveys.

Offshore wind energy targets defined in the 2015 SER agreement
Call for tender (year)	Capacity (MW)	Expected commissioning	Wind farms	Capacity (MW)	Commissioning
2016 (early)	700	2019–2020	Borssele I–II	752	2021
2016 (late)	700	2020	Borssele III–V	750.5	2021
2017	700	2021	Hollandse Kust (Zuid) I–II	759	2024 (planned)
2018	700	2022	Hollandse Kust (Zuid) III–IV	770	2024 (planned)
2019	700	2023	Hollandse Kust (Noord) V	759	2023
Total	3,500	by 2023	Total	3,790.5	by 2024

== Turbine manufacturers and repowering ==
Many small scale wind farms exist throughout the Netherlands which bear testament to earlier models of wind turbines and lesser known manufacturers which provided a range of niche products, ranging in size and power output. There are several Dutch turbine manufacturers that continue to manufacture both large and small installations for domestic and international clients. Smaller turbines are often used for off grid, bespoke and community power internationally.

Selected Dutch wind turbine manufacturers
Manufacturer/ model	Notes
Lagerwey	Started operations in 1979. Produced at least 19 models at 250, 750, 1500, 2000, 2300, 2500, 2600, 3000, 3600, 3800, 4000 and 4500 kW. Active 2020.
WES	Established 1983. Produced at least 3 models of outputs 100, 200, 250 kW. Two of the models are still under production.
NedWind	Began operating in 1990. Produced at least 8 models with power outputs of 100, 250, 500, 1000 kW. Acquired by Neg Micon 1998
Windmaster	Produced at least 14 models of 100. 150, 200, 225, 300, 500, 750, 850 and 1300 kW. Acquired by Lagerway in 1998.
2-B Energy	Started operation in 2001 and is developing a 6,000 kW two blade downwind turbine. Active 2016.
EWT	Founded in 2004, Produced at least 12 models at 250, 500, 750, 900 and 2000 kW. Active 2020.
XEMC-Darwind	Started operations 2009. Produced at least 12 models of 2000, 4000, 4500, and 5000 kW. Active 2016.

Some of the newer larger wind farms currently under construction are replacing smaller turbines previously installed at given locations. One such example is the largest wind farm in the Netherlands, Noordoostpolder, which is installing industrial scale wind turbines such as the new Enercon onshore wind turbines, at the time the largest onshore turbines in the world rated at 7500 kW nameplate capacity. The turbines have a hub height of 135 metres (443 ft) and each new turbine can generate as much electricity as all 50 turbines of the old wind farm combined. The wind farm demonstrates the growth in scale in wind power as between 1987 and 1991 it was the largest of its kind in Europe with 50 turbines and a total nameplate capacity of 15 MW. The new Zuidwester site at the wind farm will have just 12 turbines and a total nameplate capacity of 90 MW. A second hand market for turbines also exists, which could grow as older turbines are replaced by larger newer ones.

== Timeline of developments ==
=== 2022 ===
In February 2022 the Netherlands announced it increased its offshore wind target to 21 GW by 2030. That would meet approximately 75% of the country's electricity needs. With this, offshore wind energy makes an important contribution to achieving the increased climate target of 55% less CO_{2}-emissions.

=== 2018 ===
In March 2018 the Dutch government announced that between 2023 and 2030 it will build several new windfarms with a total installed capacity of 7 gigawatt. Where the parks will come and how they will be built is still being discussed. However, the government wants 40% of the total electricity used in 2030 in the Netherlands to be supplied by wind.

=== 2016 ===
In the first week of December 2016, all 150 turbines of the new 600 MW Gemini offshore windfarm began producing power, and the project is expected to be fully commissioned by mid 2017. In July 2016, the first two stages of offshore wind farm development for a combined 700 MegaWatt capacity in a water area near Borssele was awarded to DONG Energy at a price of 7.27 Euro cent per kilowatt hour for 15 years. Transmission costs of 1.4 eurocent/kWh is to be added as TenneT is required to take power from sea to shore.

=== 2015 ===
2015 was a record year for new installations in the Netherlands with 586 MW added of which 180 MW were offshore. This record was immediately beaten the following year with another 766 MW being added.

The Dutch government has expressed the aspiration to build 4.450 MW of offshore wind power by 2023 which will have a considerable impact on the Dutch electricity grid, operated by TenneT. As a first step, the government has determined 65 sites for offshore wind farms in the North Sea and IJsselmeer.

=== 2013 ===
By December 2013, 1,975 wind turbines were operational on land in the Netherlands, with an aggregate capacity of 2,479 MW. An additional 228 MW of capacity was installed at sea.

=== 2011 ===
In November 2011, the Dutch government decided to no longer fund €6 billion per year to maintain subsidized wind kWh at €0.18. It sharply cut subsidies down to €1.5 billion, leaving private sector to carry over wind turbine investments should these be beneficial.

== Onshore wind power ==
Whilst there are a growing number of large onshore wind farms in the Netherlands, most of the onshore farms in 2015 consisted of a large number of small wind farms, including many single installation turbines as well as farms of between 1–10 turbines. In total there were 3,004 MW of onshore wind power at the end of 2015. Most wind power is produced in the province of Flevoland. A few of the larger wind farms are listed here.

Selection of larger onshore wind farms in the Netherlands, March 2023
Wind farm	Province	Capacity (MW)	Turbines	Commissioning	Notes/ref
Windplan Groen	Flevoland	500	26 × GE Cypress 6MW; 15 × Nordex N163 6MW; 37 × Vestas V162 6.2MW; 8 × Vestas V126 3.45MW	2024	
Noordoostpolder	Flevoland	429	38 × Enercon E-126 7.5MW; 48 × Siemens 3.0DD-108 3MW	2017	
Princess Ariane Windpark	North Holland	360	82 × Nordex N117 3.6MW; 8 × Vestas V126 3.6MW; 9 × Other	2020	
Windplan Blauw	Flevoland	339.2	37 × EnVentus V162-5.6MW; 24 × GE Cypress 5.5MW	Planned 2024	
Zeewolde	Flevoland	321.5	9 × Vestas 2.2MW; 33 × Vestas 3.8MW; 41 × Vestas 4.3MW	2022	
De Drentse Monden en Oostermoer	Drenthe	175.5	45 × Nordex N131 3.9MW	2021	
Westereems	Groningen	171	50 × Enercon E82 3MW; 2 × Senvion M6 6.15MW; 2 × Lagerwey L136 4.5MW	2009/2012/2020	
Windpark N33	Groningen	147	35 × Siemens Gamesa DD-230 R19 4.2MW	2021	
Princess Alexia Windpark	Flevoland	122.4	36 × Senvion 3.4M104	2013	
Windpark Maasvlakte 2	South Holland	116.7	13 × Vestas V162 6.0MW; 9 × Vestas V117 4.3MW	2023	
Windpark Krammer	Zeeland	102	34 × Enercon E-115 3MW	2018/2019	
Windpark Oostpolder	Groningen	97.6	21 × Enercon E-136 4.65MW	2021	
Windpark Kreekraksluis	Zeeland	82.5	33 × Nordex 2.5MW	2013	
Windpark Kroningswind	South Holland	79.8	19 × Vestas 4.2MW	2022	
Windpark Oosterhorn	Groningen	77.4	18 × Vestas V136 4.3MW	2021	
Windpark Delfzijl Zuid	Groningen	75	34 × Enercon E70	2006	
Windpark Delfzijl Zuid Uitbreiding	Groningen	65	16	Planned 2024	
GroWind	Groningen	63	21 × Vestas	2008	
Windpark Delfzijl Noord	Groningen	62.7	19 × Nordex 3.3MW	2015	
Windpark Geefsweer	Groningen	60.2	14 × Vestas V136 4.3MW	2021	
Windpark Slufterdam	South Holland	50.4	14 × Vestas V112 3.6MW	2018	
Energiepark Pottendijk	Drenthe	50.4	14 × 3.6MW	2023	
Windpark Deil	Gelderland	46	11 × Vestas V136 4.2MW	2020	
Windpark Koegorspolder	Zeeland	42	21 × Vestas V80/2000	2007	
Windpark Nij Hiddum-Houw	Friesland	41.8	9 × Enercon E-136 4.65MW	2022	

=== Noordoostpolder ===
The largest wind farm in the Netherlands is Noordoostpolder with a capacity of 429 MW. The farm consists of three smaller wind farms owned by separate organisations with local community links. The wind farm's 86 wind turbines will produce 1.4 billion kWh of electricity annually, enough to satisfy the power needs of about 400,000 households, a figure roughly equivalent to the number of households in the Northern Netherlands.

=== Westereems ===
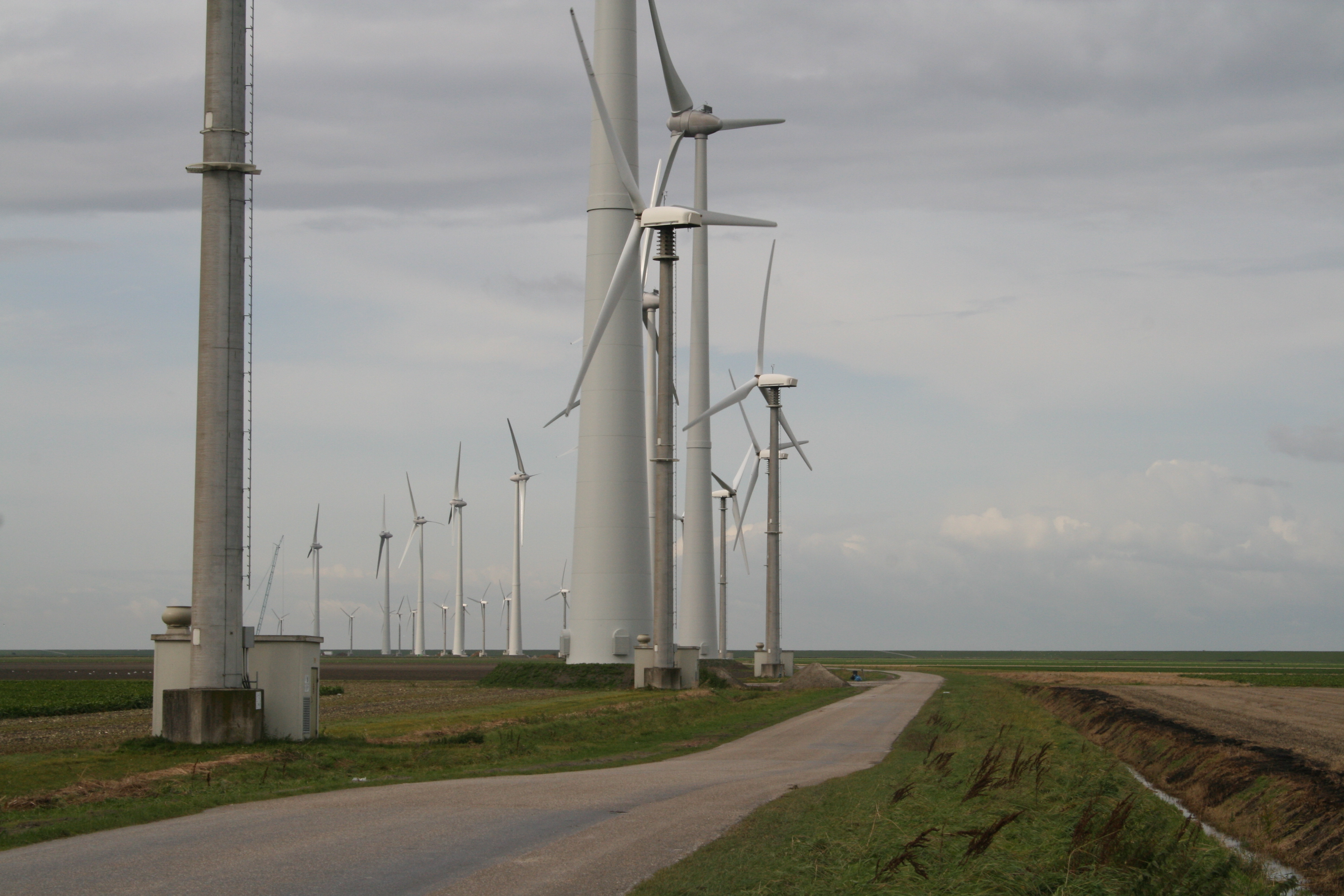
Wind turbines at the Westereems Wind Park

The next largest onshore wind farm is the Westereems wind farm located in Eemshaven in Groningen, in the north of the Netherlands.

=== Princess Alexia ===
Up until the Westereems Wind Park was commissioned the largest onshore wind farm was the Princess Alexia Windpark in Zeewolde (122MW), consisting of 36 REpower turbines and a 3.2MW/33MWh battery storage power station of BMW i3 batteries.

=== Eemmeerdijk ===
The Eemmeerdijk wind farm consists of wind turbines with just 2 blades, manufactured by Nedwind. The 19 turbines have a combined nominal power of 18 MW. The wind farm was built in 1998.

In 2006 the tower of one of the turbines had buckled. The damaged wind turbine could be safely dismantled. A second wind turbine was also dismantled. In January 2023 another wind turbine collapsed due to strong winds, leaving the farm with only 16 turbines. Later that year, exploitant of the park, Vattenfall decided to start the decommissioning of the remaining turbines.

== Offshore wind power ==
=== Current offshore wind farms ===
Wind farm	Nameplate capacity (MW)	Turbines	Commissioned	Depth range (m)	km to shore	Owner	Refs.
Wind farms in the North Sea
Egmond aan Zee	108	36 × Vestas V90-3MW	2007	15–18	13	Shell	
Princess Amalia	120	60 × Vestas V80-2MW	2008	19–24	26	Eneco	
Luchterduinen	129	43 × Vestas V112/3000	2015	18–24	24	Eneco, Mitsubishi	
Gemini	600	150 × Siemens SWT-4.0-130	2017	28–36	55	Northland Power, Siemens, Van Oord, HVC Groep	
Borssele I–II	752	94 × Siemens SWT-8.0-154	2020	14–40	22	Ørsted	
Borssele III–IV	731.5	77 × MHI Vestas V164 9.5MW	2021	14–38	22	Shell, Van Oord, Eneco, Partners Group, DGE	
Borssele V	19	2 × MHI Vestas V164 9.5MW	2021			Green Giraffe Holding, Investri Offshore, Van Oord	
Hollandse Kust (Zuid) I–IV	1529	139 × Siemens Gamesa 11.0-200 DD	2024	18–28	18–36	Vattenfall, BASF, Allianz	
Hollandse Kust (Noord) V	759	69 × Siemens Gamesa 11.0-200 DD	2023	15–28	18.5	Shell, Eneco	
Hollandse Kust (West) VI	760	52 × Vestas V236 15MW	Planned 2026		53	Shell, Eneco	constructed by Equans/Smulders
Hollandse Kust (West) VII	760	53 × Vestas V236 15MW	Planned 2028		53	RWE, TotalEnergies	
IJmuiden Ver Alpha	2000		Planned 2029		62	ABP, APG, SSE Renewables	
IJmuiden Ver Beta	2000		Planned 2029		62	Vattenfall, Copenhagen Infrastructure Partners	
Wind farms in the IJsselmeer
Lely (decommissioned 2016)	2	4 × Nedwind 500 kW/41	1994	3–4	0.8	Nuon	
Irene Vorrink (decommissioned 2022)	16.8	28 × Nordtank NTK600/43	1996	2–3	0.1	Vattenfall	
Westermeerwind (Noordoostpolder)	144	48 × Siemens SWT-3.0-DD	2016	4–7	0.7–1.2	Westermeerwind BV	
Friesland	380	89 × Siemens SWT-4.3–130	2021	3–6	2	Windpark Fryslân B.V.	
IJsselmeer Buitendijks (Windplan Blauw)	132	24 × GE Cypress 5.5 MW	2024		0.5–1.5	SwifterwinT, Vattenfall	

Offshore wind farm locations (interactive map)

=== Future offshore wind farms ===
Wind farm	Capacity (MW)	Tender	Planned commissioning
IJmuiden Ver Gamma	2000	2025	2031
Nederwiek (Zuid) I	2000	2025	2030
Nederwiek (Noord) II	2000	2026	2032
Nederwiek (Noord) III	2000	2026	2031
Doordewind I	2000	2027	2032
Ten noorden van de Waddeneilanden I	700	2027	2033
Hollandse Kust (West) VIII	700	-	-

=== Offshore grid ===
Early offshore wind farms were responsible for installing their own offshore grid infrastructure to connect their wind farm to the main electricity grid. From 2016 onwards, the national grid operator TenneT has been designated as the offshore grid operator and is responsible for the construction of transmission infrastructure at sea.

Wind farms are connected via standardised connections of 700 megawatts (MW) AC or 2 gigawatts (GW) HVDC for larger wind farms located further offshore. Through the standardisation of these offshore platforms, the government hopes to significantly reduce the overall development, construction and maintenance costs.

=== Luchterduinen ===
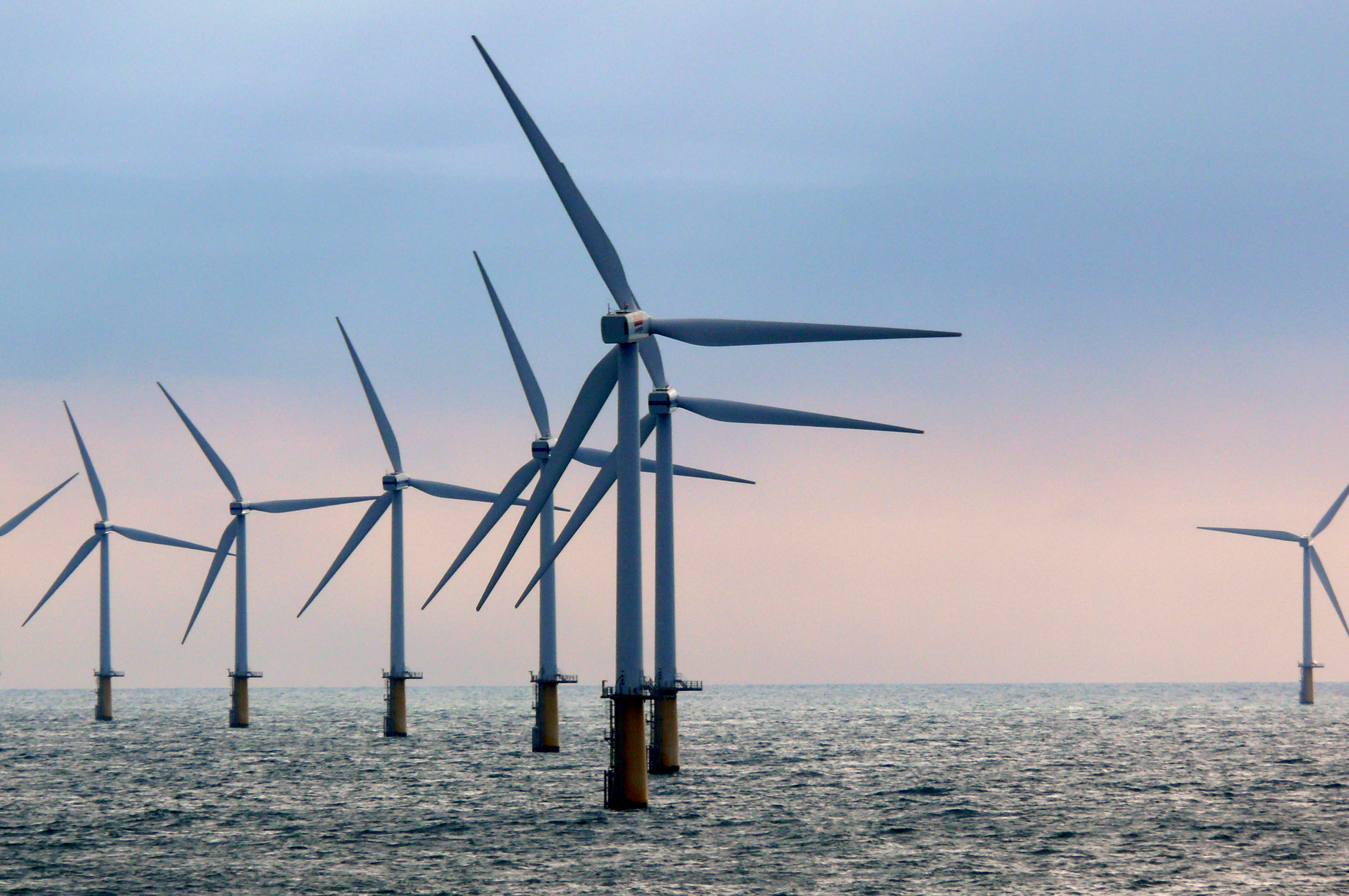
Princess Amalia Wind Farm in the North Sea

The Eneco Luchterduinen wind farm was officially opened in September 2015 and is a 50/50 joint venture between Dutch energy company Eneco and Japan's Mitsubishi corporation. The 129 MW Eneco Luchterduinen wind farm is located 23 km off the coast between Zandvoort and Noordwijk cities in the Netherlands. The farm consists of 43 Vestas V112 turbines of 3 MW capacity each.

=== Princess Amalia ===
In 2008, a second, somewhat larger offshore wind farm was built: the Princess Amalia Wind Farm, consisting of 60 Vestas V80 2MW turbines totaling 120 MW, sufficient to power 125,000 homes and help the Netherlands cut 225,000 tonnes of carbon dioxide emissions. The wind park was developed off the coast of IJmuiden by Econcern and Eneco Energie, at a total cost of $522.3 million.

=== Egmond aan Zee (OWEZ) ===
In 2006, the Egmond aan Zee Offshore Wind Farm was built, consisting of 36 Vestas V90 3MW turbines, totaling 108 MW, sufficient to light 100,000 houses. The project cost $272 million and is cooperatively owned by Royal Dutch Shell and the Dutch utility company Nuon.

=== Lely ===
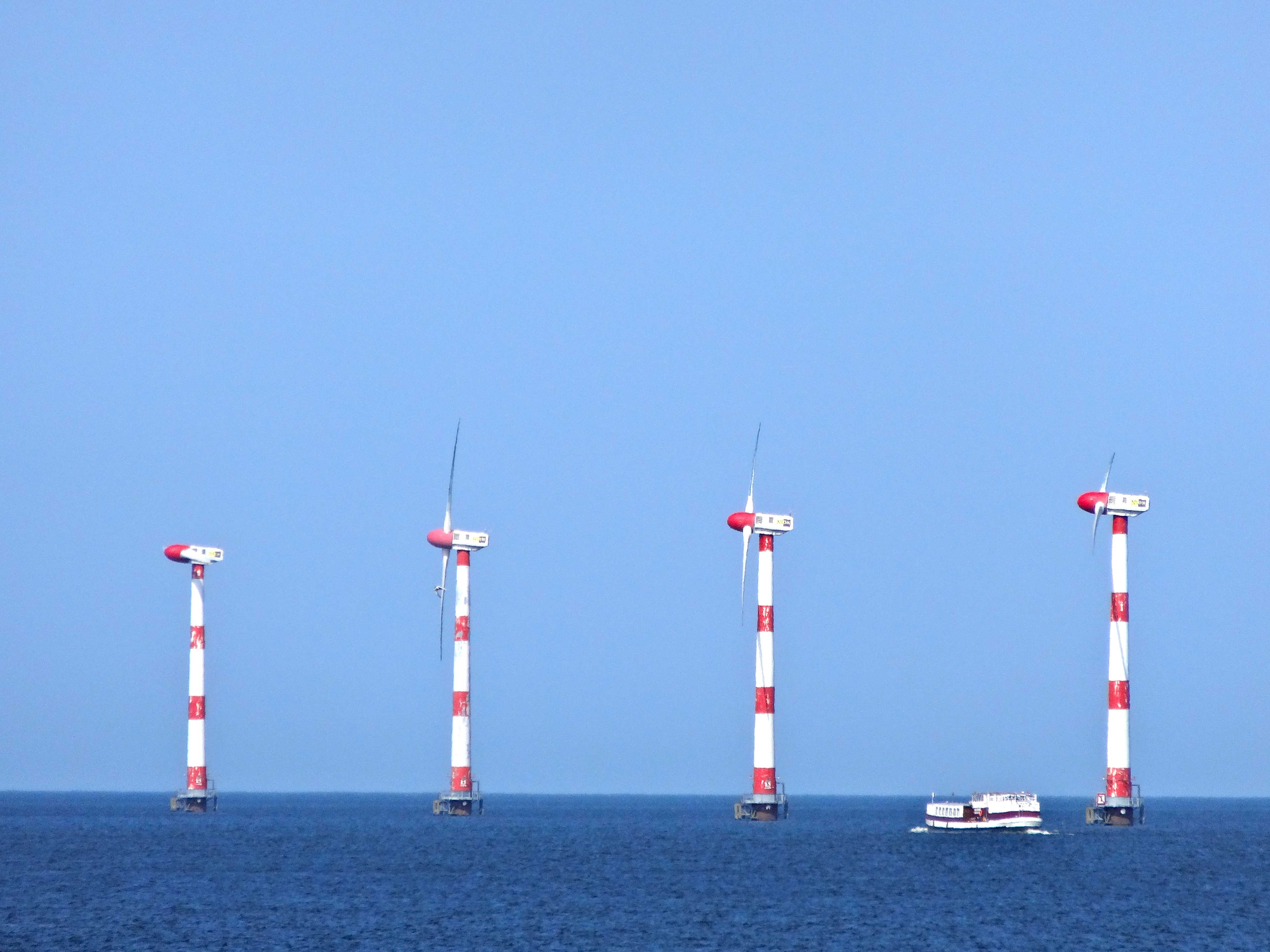
Lely Offshore Wind Farm

Lely was the first offshore wind farm in the Netherlands. Construction began in 1992 and the farm was completed in 1994. The nearshore wind farm had 4 Nedwind 500 kW turbines located 1 km to shore.

In 2014 one of the turbines lost its rotor with both blades due to metal fatigue. The 4 wind turbines were eventually dismantled in 2016, after 22 years of service.

== See also ==
- Community wind energy
- Solar power in the Netherlands
- Hydroelectric power in the Netherlands
- Renewable energy in the Netherlands
- Renewable energy by country
