= Egmond aan Zee Offshore Wind Farm =

Dutch offshore wind farm in the North Sea

Offshore Windpark Egmond aan Zee
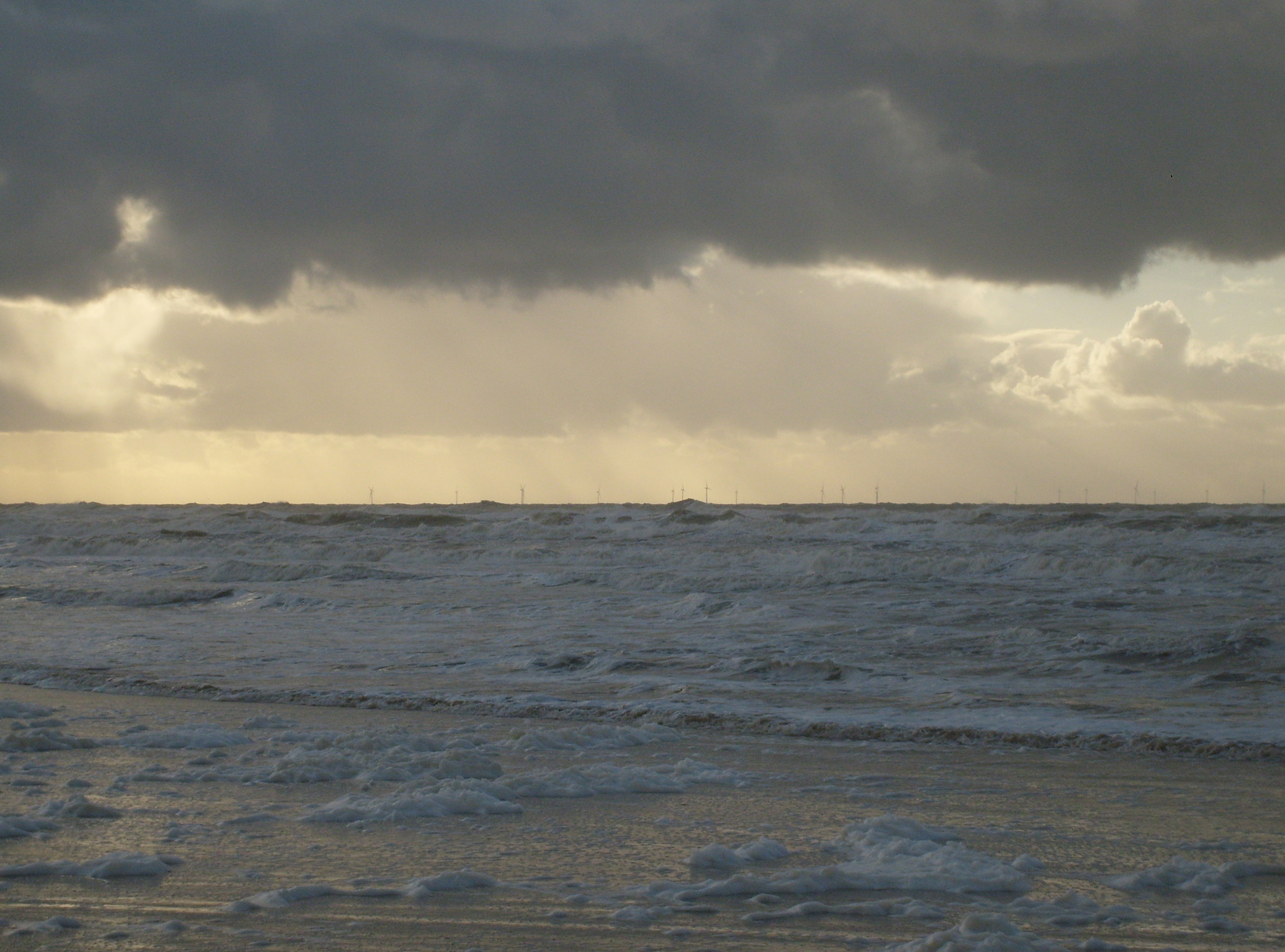
- View of the distant wind turbines from shore at Bergen aan Zee, North Holland
- Country: Netherlands
- Location: offshore of Egmond aan Zee, Netherlands
- Coordinates: 52°36′N 4°25′E
- Status: Operational
- Construction began: 2006
- Commission date: 18 April 2007
- Owner: Shell plc

Wind farm
- Type: Offshore
- Distance from shore: 10 km (6.2 mi)
- Hub height: 70 m (230 ft)
- Rotor diameter: 90 m (300 ft)
- Rated wind speed: 15 m/s (49 ft/s)
- Site area: 27 km^{2} (10 sq mi)

Power generation
- Units operational: 36 × 3 MW
- Make and model: Vestas V90/3000 (36)
- Nameplate capacity: 108 MW

External links
- Commons: Related media on Commons

Offshore Windpark Egmond aan Zee (OWEZ) is an offshore wind farm in the Dutch part of the North Sea, located approximately 10 km from the coast near Egmond aan Zee. It was the first large-scale offshore wind farm to be built off the Dutch North Sea coast. The wind farm was built by NoordzeeWind, a joint venture consisting of Shell and Nuon.

In March 2021, it was announced that Shell would take full ownership of the wind farm. It already owned 50% of the shares, and had acquired the other half from Vattenfall. The purchase price was not disclosed.

== History ==
In 2001, the Dutch government launched a tender for the offshore wind farm. NoordzeeWind was selected as the winner in the spring of 2001. In July of the same year, the concession agreement was signed with the government for the realisation of the wind farm.

The final contracts were signed in 2005 and construction of the farm began in 2006. It was built by a consortium of Ballast Nedam and wind turbine manufacturer Vestas.

The wind farm was officially inaugurated by Prince Willem-Alexander on 18 April 2007.

== Location and size ==
Wind farm layout

The wind farm is located 10 km (6.2 mi) to 18 km (11 mi) off the coasts of Egmond aan Zee and is visible from the shore. The total area of the farms is around 27 square kilometres (10 sq mi). The farm consists of 36 Vestas V90-3MW wind turbines, each with a nameplate capacity of 3 MW. In total, the farm has a capacity of 108 MW. Together, they are designed to provide energy for up to 100,000 Dutch households. The facility is being refurbished in 2021.

== Gallery ==
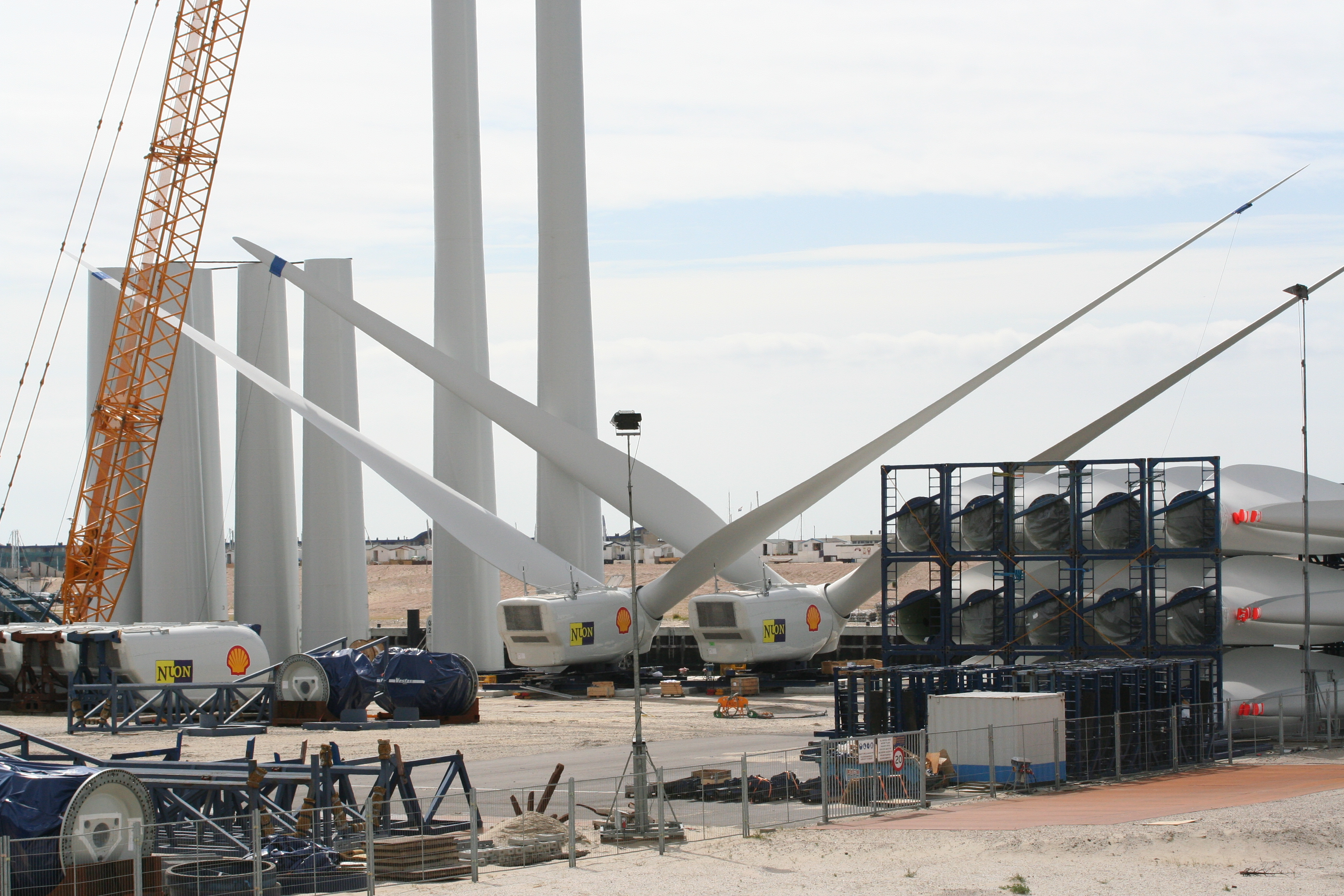
Wind turbine components in an assembly area onshore before installation at sea

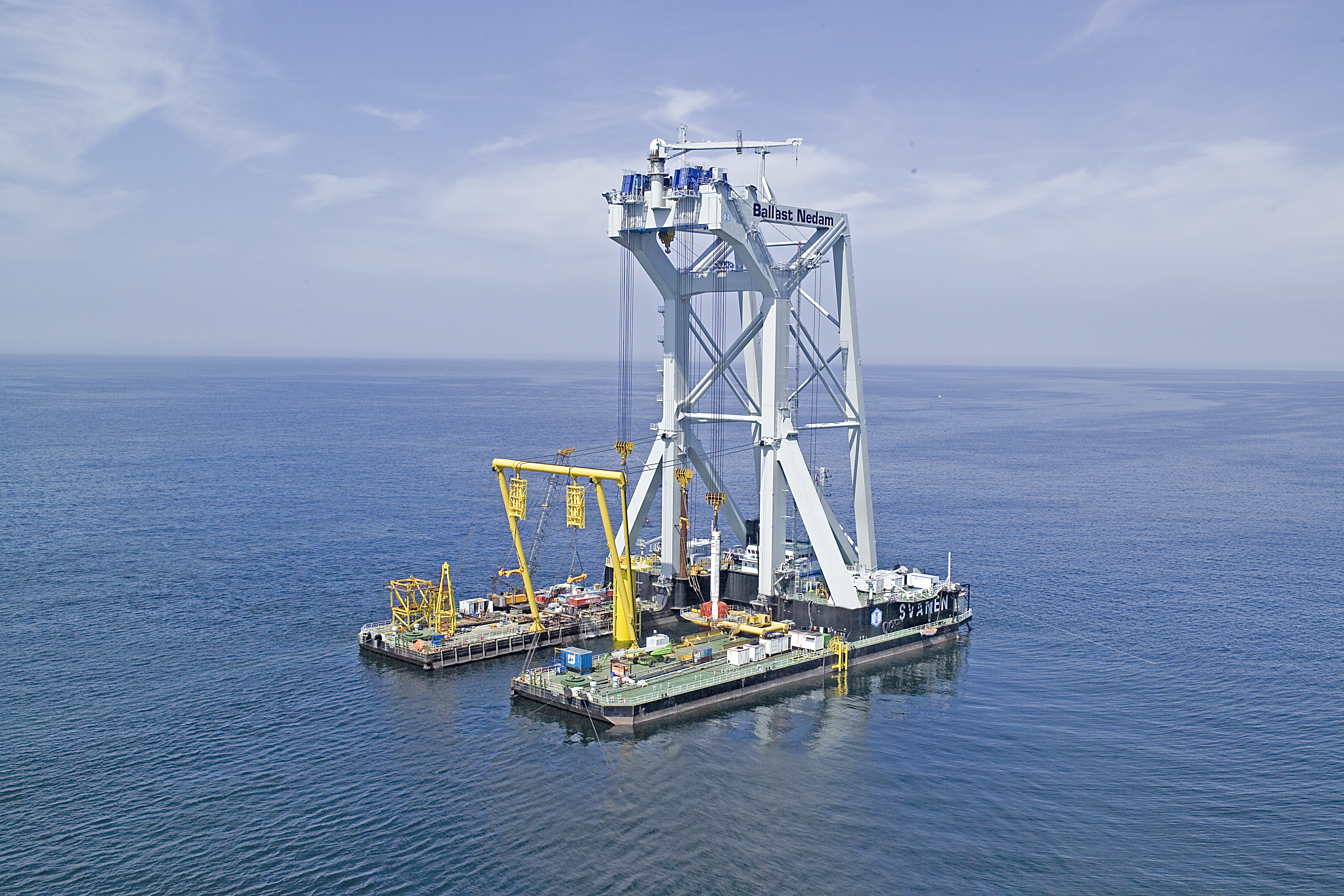
HLV Svanen at the Offshore Windfarm Egmond aan Zee

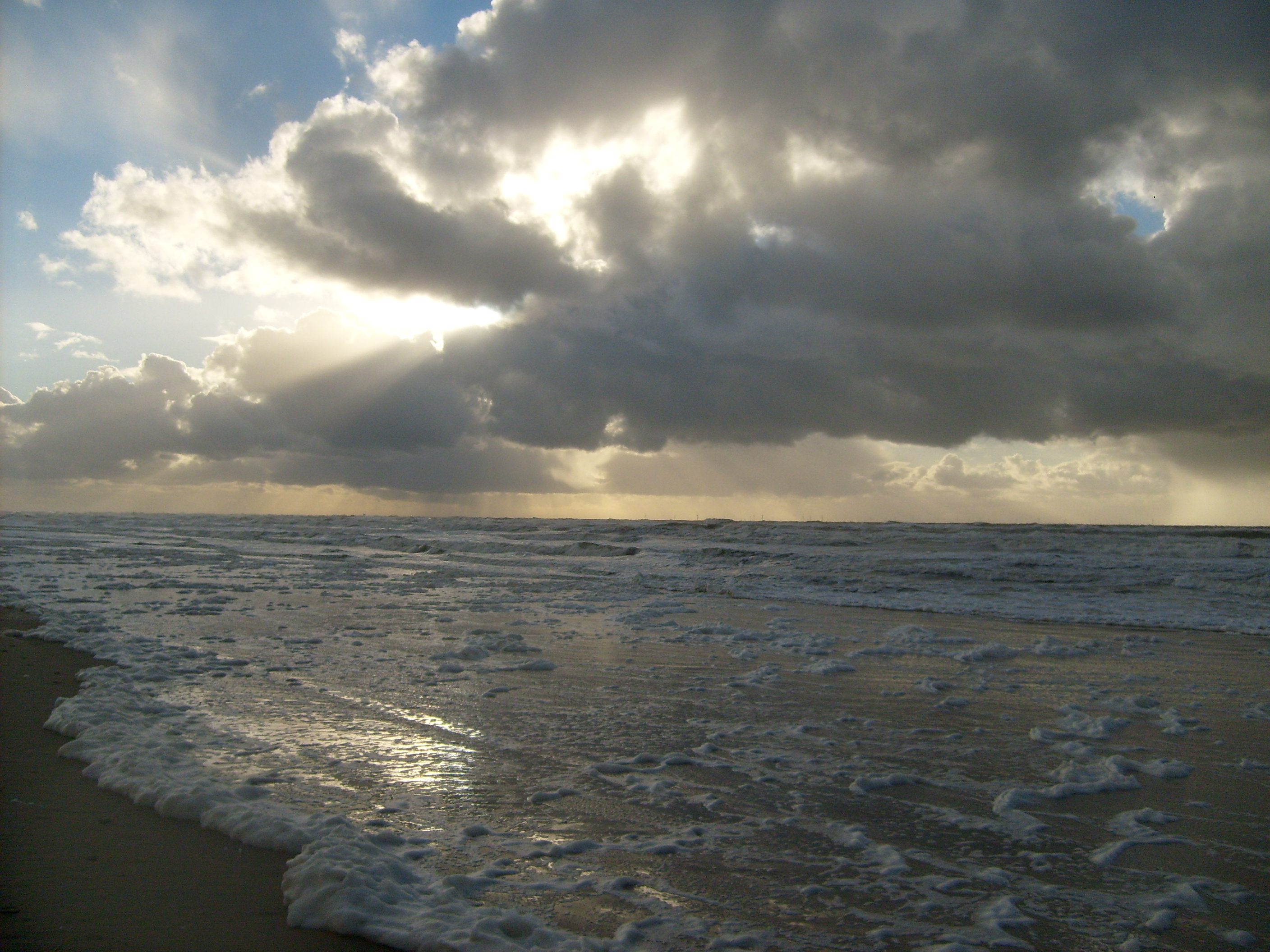
Another view from shore

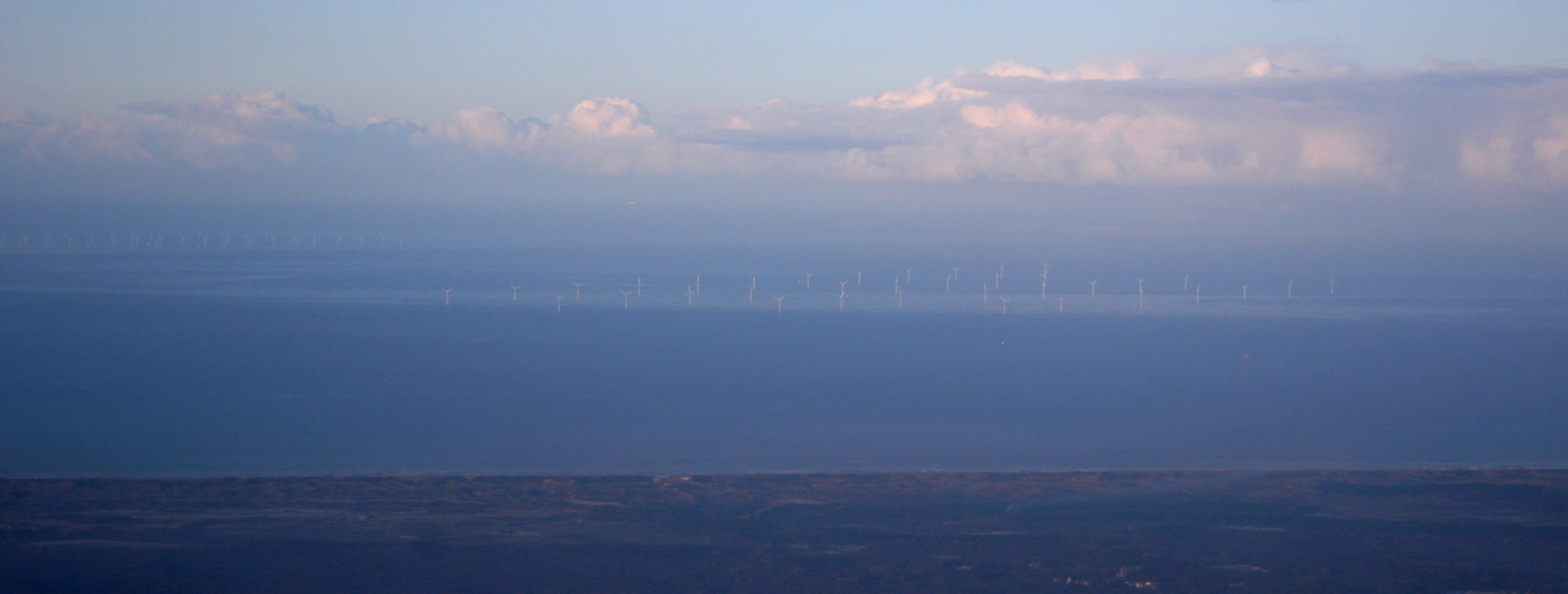
View from above

== See also ==
- List of Offshore Wind Farms
- List of offshore wind farms in the North Sea
- List of offshore wind farms in the Netherlands
- Princess Amalia Wind Farm
- Wind power in the Netherlands
- Renewable energy in the Netherlands
