= List of most powerful wind turbines =

This is a table of the most powerful wind turbines. The table includes wind turbines with a power rating that is within 5 MW of the current most powerful wind turbine that has received customer orders that is at least at the prototype stage. All the most powerful turbines are offshore wind turbines. This table also includes the most powerful onshore wind turbines, although they are relatively small compared to the largest offshore ones.

== Offshore wind turbine models ==
Manufacturer	Model	Power rating (MW)	Deployment status	Deployment date	Wind farms	Notes and references
Dongfang Electric	DEW-26 MW-310	26	Prototype	September, 2025		
Mingyang Wind Power	MySE 22MW	22	Concept			
Siemens Gamesa	SG DD-276	21.5	Prototype	April 2025	Denmark	
CTG	-	20	Prototype	January 2026	Zhangpu Liuao Phase 2, China	Most powerful prototype installed offshore
Mingyang Wind Power	MySE18.X-20MW	18.X to 20 MW	Prototype failed		Lingao, Hainan	
Dongfang Electric	DEW-18 MW-260	18	Prototype	June 2024	Shantou City, Guangdong Province, China	
Mingyang Wind Power	MySE 16.0-260	16	Prototype	July 2023	Fujian	
Goldwind	GWH252-16MW	16	Commercially deployed	June 2024	Zhangpu Liuao Phase 2, China	
Siemens Gamesa	SG DD 14-222/236	15.5 (with Power Boost)	Commercially deployed	April 2024	Moray West, United Kingdom	
Vestas	V236	15	Commercially deployed	April 2025	He Dreiht, Germany. Baltic Power, Poland. Hollandse Kust West, Netherlands. Empire Wind, United States.	
GE Wind Energy	Haliade-X	14.7	Prototype		Dogger Bank C, United Kingdom	
GE Wind Energy	Haliade-X	13	Commercially deployed	August 2023	Dogger Bank A and Dogger Bank B, United Kingdom. Vineyard Wind, United States.	
Mingyang Wind Power	MySE 12-242	12	Commercially deployed	August 2023	Qingzhou 4	

== Onshore wind turbine models ==
Manufacturer	Model	Power rating (MW)	Deployment status	Deployment date	Wind farms	Notes and references
Sany	SI-270150	15	Prototype	November 2024		
Sany	SI-230100	10	Commercially deployed	January 2025	Huadian Ning'an Fengshuishan, China	
Envision Energy	Unknown	8	Commercially deployed	January 2026	Egypt	
Envision Energy	EN182-7.8MW	7.8	Prototype	January 2026	China	
Goldwind	GWH221-7.7MW	7.7	Commercially deployed	September 2025	China	
Windey	WD200-7700	7.7	Commercially deployed	October 2024	Kazakhstan, Saudi Arabia	
Enercon	E-126 7.580	7.5	No longer offered for sale		Magdeburg-Rothensee, Ellern, Germany. Estinnes, Belgium. Noordoostpolder , Netherlands.	
Vestas	V172-7.2MW	7.2	Commercially deployed	Jun 2025	Eikel-Salzkotten, Germany	
WEG Industries	AGW172/7.X	7	Prototype			
Nordex	N163/6.X	6.8	Commercially deployed	February 2024	Olsterwind, Netherlands	
Siemens Gamesa	SG 6.6-170	6.6	Commercially deployed	2025	Ljusdal, Sweden	
Envision Energy	EN171-6.5 MW	6.5	Commercially deployed	May 2025	Egypt	
Vestas	V162-6.2	6.2	Commercially deployed	September 2023	Karstädt-Waterloo	
GE Wind Energy	Cypress 6.0-164	6	Commercially deployed	September 2023	Hanze	

== See also ==
- Østerild Wind Turbine Test Field, test site of several prototypes
