= Trillium Power Wind 1 =

Wind farm in Canada

- Location of Trillium Power Wind 1 in Ontario
- Country: Canada
- Location: Southwest of Main Duck Island Shoal, northeastern Lake Ontario
- Coordinates: 43°50′24″N 76°41′24″W
- Status: Under development
- Owner: Trillium Power Wind Corporation

Power generation
- Nameplate capacity: 500 MW

Trillium Power Wind 1 (TPW1) is a proposed 350 to 400 megawatt (MW) far-offshore wind farm in the Canadian waters of northeastern Lake Ontario at least 17 to 28 km (11 to 17 mi) from the nearest mainland. This renewable energy project is under development by Trillium Power Wind Corporation, a privately held, Canadian-owned company headquartered in Toronto, Ontario. The project was suspended by the Ontario government on February 11, 2011. This timing coincided with Trillium Power's scheduled closing of $26 million in financing for the project, prompting the company to file a lawsuit against the province. Given its level of development at the time of suspension, TPW1 would have been the first offshore wind farm built in the Great Lakes.

== Project description ==
The TPW1 far-offshore wind site is acknowledged as the premier site in North America and especially The Great Lakes. The TPW1 site will be located in northeastern Lake Ontario, approximately 38 km (24 mi) southwest of Kingston, Ontario on the shoals southwest of Main Duck Island. The project will consist of approximately 60 x 6.0MW turbines and linked via offshore substation to the Lennox Transmission Station by way of an underwater cable. The total project cost is estimated at $2 billion of private capital with no cost to taxpayers for the proposed construction.

TPW1 will produce between 350 and 400 megawatts (MW) of electricity with a net capacity factor of >45% (due to the quality of its power density), or up to 1.5 TWhs of energy per year which is equivalent to the amount of power consumed by a minimum of 150,000 typical Ontario households. TPW1 will offset at least 1.5 million tonnes of CO_{2} emissions from coal-fired generation and 931,745 tonnes of CO_{2} emissions from natural gas generation every year.

All offshore wind power projects were suspended by the Ontario government, on February 11, 2011, at the exact time of Trillium Power's closing of a $26 million tranche of equity financing on February 11, 2011 at 3:00 pm.

On May 19, 2011 Trillium Power Wind Corporation gave notice to the McGuinty Government that if its action against Trillium Power was not corrected it would initiate litigation against the Government of Ontario for CDN$2.25 billion. No correction was made as requested. Therefore, on September 28, 2011, Trillium Power Wind Corporation filed its claim in the Ontario Superior Court of Justice and was assigned the court file No. CV-11-436012. The legal claim was initiated against the government of Dalton McGuinty in 2011. In 2015 Trillium Power uncovered that evidence in the possession of the Government of Ontario had been destroyed and mislabeled (to not be found in searches) and presented this information to the court. The court then allowed Trillium Power to amend its litigation claims to include the claim of spoliation. In 2023, the Ontario Court of Appeal ruled in Trillium Power Wind Corp. v. Ontario (2023 ONCA 412) that the Ontario government deliberately destroyed evidence ("spoliation") related to the cancellation of a wind project, which amounted to an abuse of process. The Court ordered that Ontario be deprived of its costs and awarded costs to Trillium. The Court set aside the dismissal of the spoliation claim and awarded costs of the appeal to Trillium, although it did not immediately grant a massive damages award. In March 2024, the Supreme Court of Canada dismissed the application for leave to appeal this 2023 ONCA decision.

== Key attributes ==
- Mean wind speed of 9.0 m/s at 100 m hub height based on data collected by both LIDAR and in-situ Meteorological Mast wind-measuring devices, along with 36 years of data collected on Main Duck Island;
- Water depth ranging from 2 to 40 m (6 to 130 ft);
- A unique Power density of 938 W/m^{3};
- Close proximity to major grid interconnection points (28 km);
- Average wave height of less than 1 m (3.2 feet) 94% of the time from April to November;
- Low/zero visibility from mainland shore or nearby major islands.
- Fresh water site that does not require expensive wind turbines for salt-water oceans or seas.
- The Great Lakes (and other lakes) do not have tides.

== Approvals process and current status ==
Trillium Power followed Ontario's Renewable Energy Approval process. As of February 11, 2011, when the project was suspended, Trillium Power had completed over 105 studies, reports and regulatory actions including, but not limited to: avian, aquatic, geophysical, ice, wave, navigation, noise, etc. The first round of public consultations were held in Napanee, Ontario, Picton, Ontario and Cape Vincent, New York in early July 2010. While the province should and will need to update their offshore wind regulatory framework, they have an advantage due to the infrastructure already in place.

Since the suspension the government of Ontario has completed further scientific reports including the final piece that examines the decommissioning of offshore wind farms. Additionally, several fresh water offshore wind farms, including a 380 MW project in the Netherlands (Frysland). An additional and extensive report on offshore wind by the US National Renewable Energy Laboratory (NREL) concluded "no insurmountable barriers to Great Lakes wind energy development".

The TPW1 site will be located on provincial Crown Land that was paid for and secured through Ontario's MNR Windpower Site Release and Development Program that included an embedded Land Use Permit (LUP) at the time of its registration.

TPW1 remains the only offshore wind project in the Ontario Great Lakes with advanced development status to help Ontario meet its "all-of-the-above" mandate and aligns ideally with the province's integrated energy plan - Energy for Generations.

== Additional projects ==
TPW1 is the first of Trillium Power's four distinct offshore wind developments in the Great Lakes. Trillium Power's additional sites include: Trillium Power Wind 2 (TPW2) and ideal phase 2 in continuing the build-out of TPW1, The Great Lakes Array in Lake St. Clair and The Superior Array in Lake Superior.

== Ontario's energy transition 2025 ==
In its 2022 "Pathways to Decarbonization" report, the IESO identified the need for 11 TWhs of offshore wind energy to satisfy growing consumption in the province, which faced a 65% increase in electricity demand. In 2025, the IESO's annual outlook increased this estimate to 75%, and the province now projects the need to double its electrical energy generation by 2050. Ontario's most recent integrated energy plan Energy for Generations, which stresses that an "all-of-the-above" approach to generation technologies is needed to rapidly address the IESO's current outlook, has drawn criticisms for its exclusion of offshore wind technology. Opponents of the provincial ban on offshore wind argue that it aligns with the plan's scalability, affordability, security, and clean energy generation requirements.

== See also ==
- Wind power in Canada
- List of Offshore Wind Farms
- Feed-in tariff
- Green Energy Act 2009
