= Hollandse Kust West Offshore Wind Farm =

Hollandse Kust West
- Country: Netherlands
- Location: North Sea
- Coordinates: 52°41′N 3°46′E
- Status: Proposed
- Owners: Chubu Electric Power; Eneco; RWE AG; Shell plc; TotalEnergies

Wind farm
- Type: Offshore
- Distance from shore: 53 km (33 mi)
- Site area: 176 km^{2} (68 sq mi)

Power generation
- Make and model: Vestas V236-15.0MW (VI); Vestas V236-15.0MW (VII)
- Units planned: 52 × 15 MW (VI); 53 × 15 MW (VI)
- Nameplate capacity: 760 MW (VI); 760 MW (VII); 700 MW (VIII)

External links
- Website: https://ecowende.nl/

Hollandse Kust West Wind Farm (officially Hollandse Kust (West) Wind Farm Zone) is a planned offshore wind farm in the Dutch part of the North Sea. The wind farm consists of 3 sites with a capacity of around 700 MW each. The farm is located around 53 km off of the Dutch coast. It is the third offshore wind farm in the Netherlands after the Hollandse Kust Zuid and Hollandse Kust Noord wind farms to be built without subsidies.

Originally only 2 sites were planned. A possible third site was added in 2022.

== Wind Farms ==
=== Hollandse Kust (West) VI ===
The tender for this site was won by Ecowende, a consortion of Shell and Eneco. The wind farm will be built by Van Oord.

=== Hollandse Kust (West) VII ===
The tender for the second site was won by Oranje Wind Power II, a subsidiary of RWE. In July 2024, it was announced that TotalEnergies would acquire a 50% stake in the OranjeWind project from RWE.

The wind farm will consist of 53 Vestas V236-15.0 MW wind turbines. The site will have an installed capacity of around 795 MW and a grid connection capacity of 760 MW. The wind farm will be built by Jan De Nul. Construction is expected to start in 2026 with full commissioning expected in early 2028.

=== Hollandse Kust (West) VIII ===
The site was added in 2022. The tender for this site is expected to be held in 2026 or 2027.

== See also ==
- List of offshore wind farms in the North Sea
- List of offshore wind farms in the Netherlands
