= Eemmeerdijk Wind Park =

Wind farm in Zeewolde, Netherlands

Eemmeerdijk Wind Farm
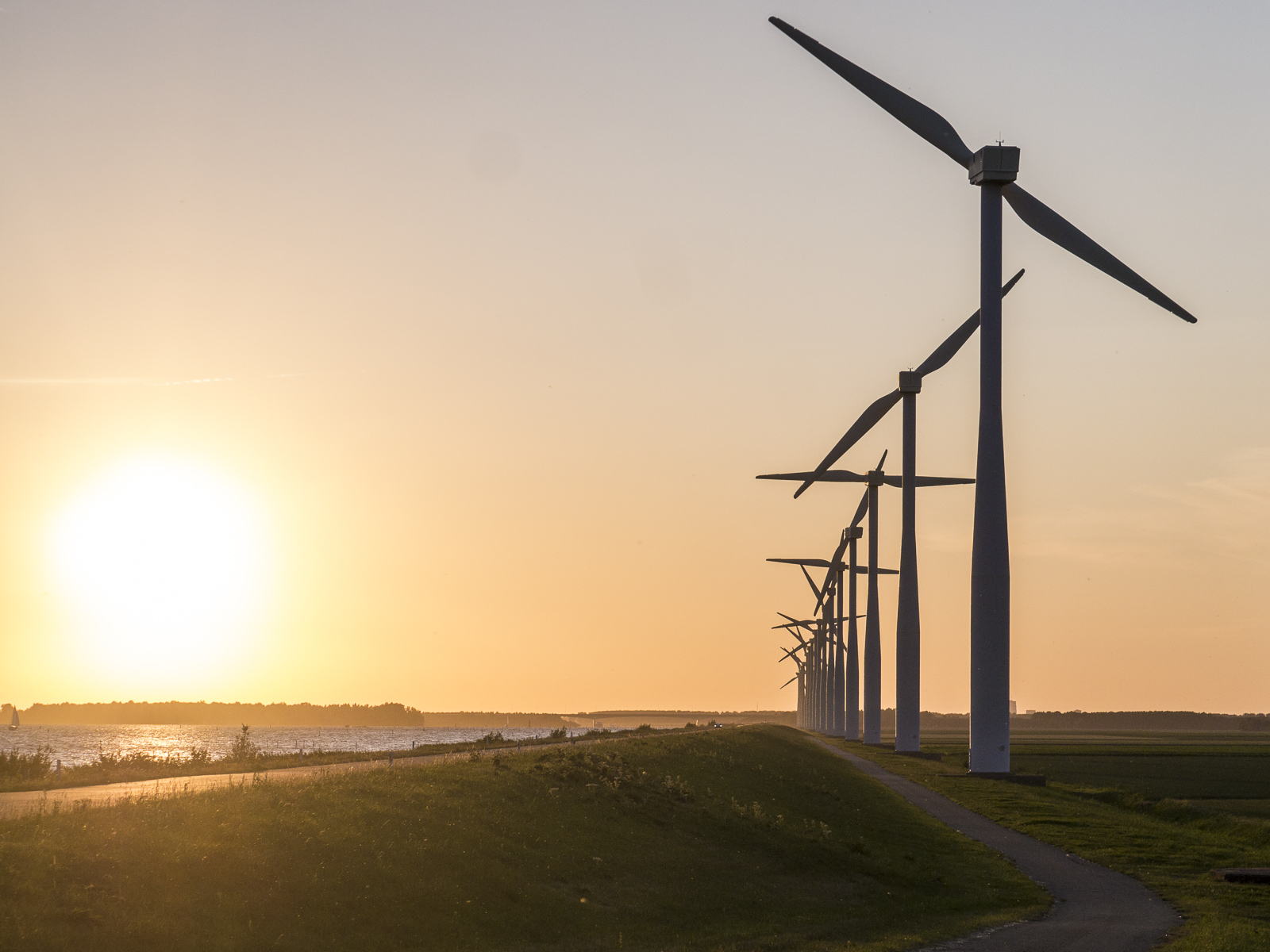
- Country: Netherlands
- Coordinates: 52°16′36″N 5°21′51″E
- Status: Decommissioned
- Commission date: 1998
- Decommission date: 2023
- Operator: Vattenfall Nederland

Wind farm
- Rotor diameter: 55 m (180 ft)

Power generation
- Units decommissioned: 19 × 1 MW
- Nameplate capacity: 19 MW

External links
- Commons: Related media on Commons

Eemmeerdijk Wind Park was a wind park situated at Zeewolde, Netherlands. It is one of the few wind parks using wind turbines with just two blades. It was built in 1998 and used 19 wind turbines manufactured by NedWind with a 60-metre tall tower and a 55-metre large rotor. However, turbines 6 and 9 have been decommissioned and dismantled after a nick was found in the pylon of turbine 6 in 2006. And after lightning hit a blade from turbine 9. Turbine 7 has fallen down on January 4, 2023, due to the heavy winds and a faulty blade pitch and braking system. The breaking of turbine 7 was the reason for the shutdown of the rest of the wind farm. The plan was to thoroughly examine all other turbines for faults and then switch the ones that were in good condition back on. But Vattenfall decided that it would not make sense to do the examination because the wind turbines were scheduled for removal before October 2023. So the windturbines were switched off until destruction.

== Locations ==
Wind turbine locations
- Turbine 1: 52.297877°N 5.329077°E
- Turbine 2: 52.296328°N 5.331717°E
- Turbine 3: 52.294773°N 5.334356°E
- Turbine 4: 52.293212°N 5.337006°E
- Turbine 5: 52.29165°N 5.339634°E
- Turbine 6: 52.290095°N 5.342274°E has been decommissioned
- Turbine 7: 52.288539°N 5.344913°E has been decommissioned / has fallen down
- Turbine 8: 52.286984°N 5.347563°E
- Turbine 9: 52.285422°N 5.350192°E has been decommissioned
- Turbine 10: 52.28386°N 5.352852°E
- Turbine 11: 52.282317°N 5.355470°E
- Turbine 12: 52.280742°N 5.35811°E
- Turbine 13: 52.279193°N 5.360738°E
- Turbine 14: 52.277624°N 5.363399°E
- Turbine 15: 52.276062°N 5.366017°E
- Turbine 16: 52.274506°N 5.368677°E
- Turbine 17: 52.272950°N 5.371306°E
- Turbine 18: 52.271401°N 5.373935°E
- Turbine 19: 52.269825°N 5.376574°E

== See also ==
- Wind power in the Netherlands
- Renewable energy in the Netherlands
