= Q10 =

Q10 or Q-10 may refer to:

== Science and technology ==
- Q10 (temperature coefficient)
- Coenzyme Q10, a dietary supplement
- BlackBerry Q10, a smartphone

== Transportation ==
- Q10 (New York City bus)
- MMIST CQ-10 Snowgoose, a U.S. Army cargo UAV
- LNER Class Q10, a class of British steam locomotives

== Other uses ==
- Q10 Wind Farm, an offshore wind farm in the Netherlands, now renamed to Luchterduinen
- Quran 10, Yūnus, 10th chapter

== See also ==
- 10Q, a quarterly financial report
