= Borssele Offshore Wind Farm =

Dutch offshore wind farm in the North Sea

Borssele
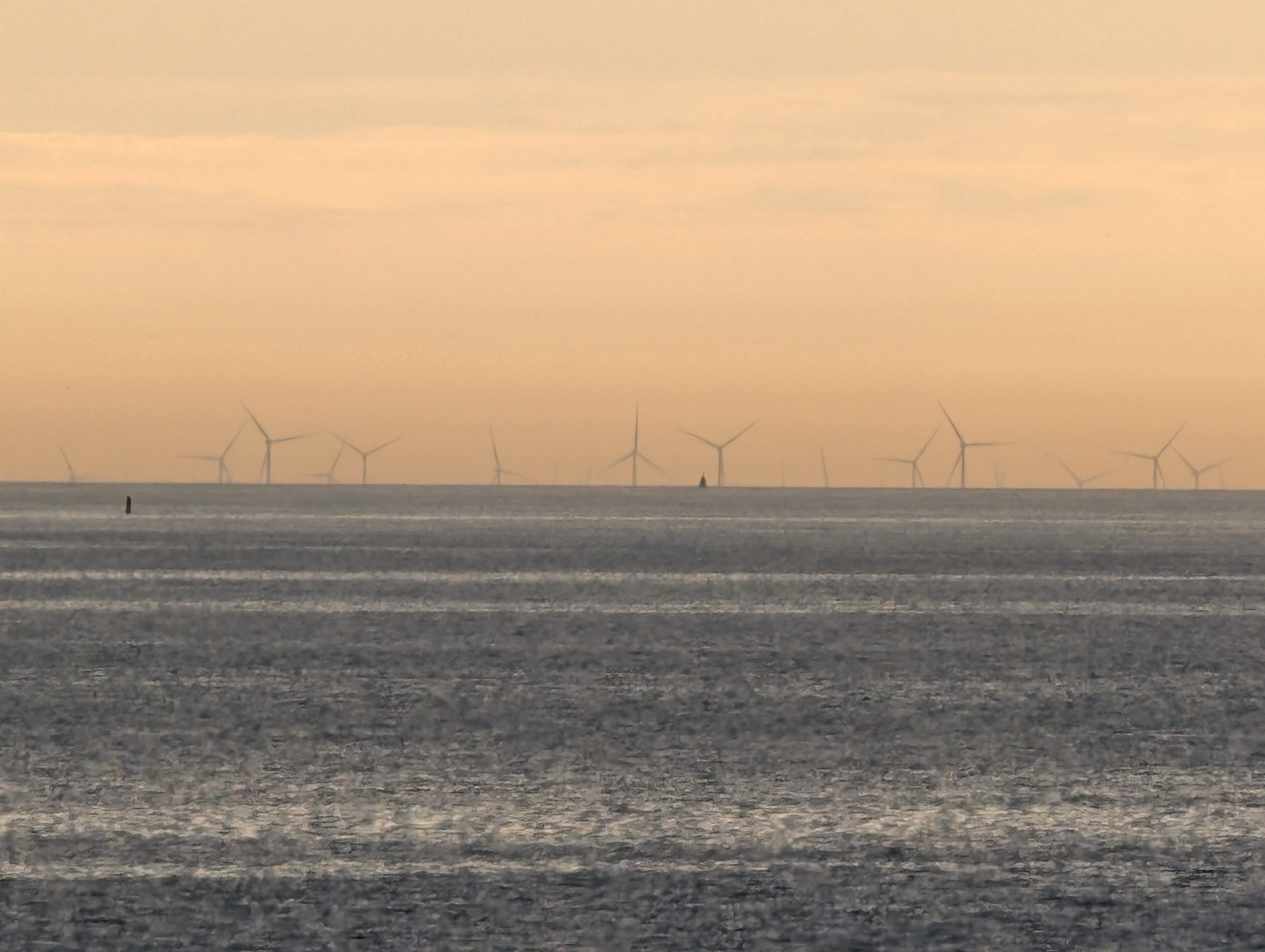
- Country: Netherlands
- Location: North Sea
- Coordinates: 51°43′N 3°00′E
- Commission date: 2021
- Owner: multiple

Wind farm
- Type: Offshore
- Distance from shore: 24 km (15 mi)
- Site area: 344 km^{2} (133 sq mi)

Power generation
- Units operational: 94 × 8 MW (I & II); 77 × 9.5 MW (III & IV); 2 × 9.5 MW (V)
- Make and model: Siemens SWT-8.0-154 (I & II); Vestas V164-9.5MW (III & IV); Vestas V164-9.5MW (V)
- Nameplate capacity: 752 MW (I & II); 731.5 MW (III & IV); 18 MW (V)

External links
- Commons: Related media on Commons

Borssele Offshore Wind Farm (officially Borssele Wind Farm Zone) is an offshore wind farm in the Dutch part of the North Sea, named for Borssele (the nearest village), near the border with Belgium. The offshore area consists of 5 sites and 3 farms so far with a total capacity of 1502.5 MW.

== Wind Farms ==
Wind farm layout

=== Borssele I & II ===
Borssele I & II consists of 94 Siemens Gamesa 8 MW wind turbines for a total capacity of 752 MW. It was built by Ørsted.

The tender for this farm took place in 2016. A total of 38 bids were received. On 5 July 2017, it was announced that Ørsted had won the tender. Construction of the wind farm began in January 2020 and the first electricity was generated in April 2020. By the end of 2020, the construction was finished. The official opening was on 6 September 2021. Ørsted tested cargo drones in 2024.

=== Borssele III & IV ===
Consists of 77 Vestas V164 9.5 MW wind turbines for a total capacity of 731,5 MW. Built by Blauwwind II, a consortium of Shell, Van Oord, Eneco and Mitsubishi. The tender for this farm was held in 2016. A total of 26 bids were submitted. On 12 December 2016, it was announced that Blauwwind II had won the tender.

=== Borssele V ===
Consists of 2 Vestas V164 9.5 MW wind turbines. The wind farm was built by Two Towers, a consortium of Van Oord Renewable Finance, Investri Offshore and Green Giraffe Holding.

== See also ==
- List of Offshore Wind Farms
- List of offshore wind farms in the North Sea
- List of offshore wind farms in the Netherlands
- Wind power in the Netherlands
- Renewable energy in the Netherlands
