= Luchterduinen Offshore Wind Farm =

Luchterduinen
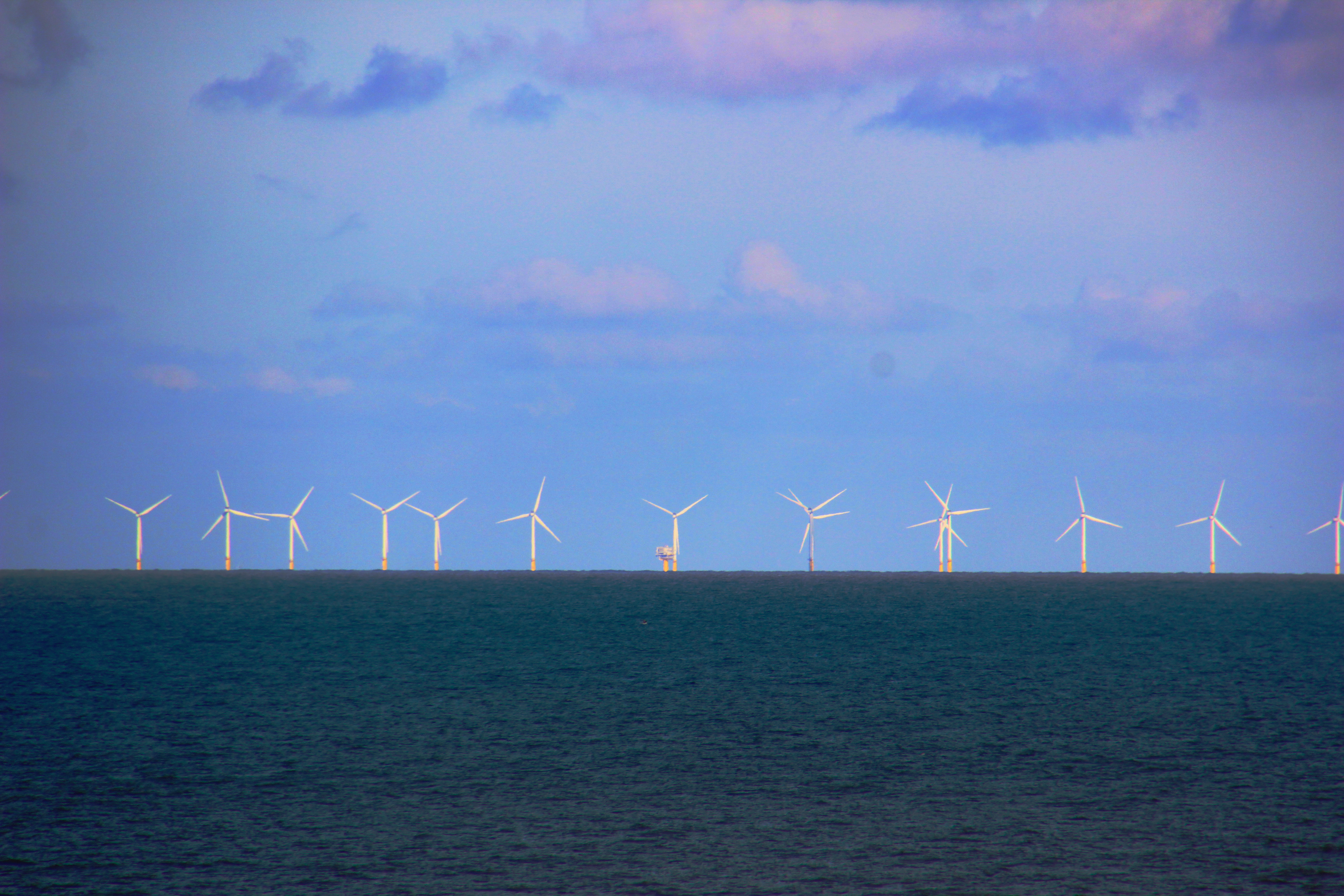
- Country: Netherlands
- Coordinates: 52°25′N 4°10′E
- Status: Operational
- Commission date: 21 September 2015
- Owners: Eneco; Mitsubishi Corporation

Wind farm
- Type: Offshore
- Rotor diameter: 112 m (367 ft)

Power generation
- Units operational: 43 × 3 MW
- Make and model: Vestas V112-3.0MW (43)
- Nameplate capacity: 129 MW

External links
- Commons: Related media on Commons

Luchterduinen is an offshore wind farm in the North Sea, 23 kilometres off the coast near Noordwijk aan Zee. The farm was developed by Eneco and has been fully operational since September 2015.

The wind farm had the working name Q10. A vote was held for a new name. On 15 May 2012, the name Luchterduinen was chosen from 150 submissions, referring to the dunes between Noordwijk and Zandvoort where a building called Huis ter Lucht used to stand.

Wind farm layout

The farm consists of 43 Vestas V112 (3 MW) wind turbines with a total capacity of 129 MW. The farm covers an area of approximately 16 square kilometres. it is encompassed by the Hollandse Kust Zuid offshore wind farm on the northwest, southwest and southeast.

== See also ==
- List of Offshore Wind Farms
- List of offshore wind farms in the North Sea
- List of offshore wind farms in the Netherlands
- Wind power in the Netherlands
- Renewable energy in the Netherlands
