= Windpark Fryslân =

Wind farm in the Netherlands

Fryslân
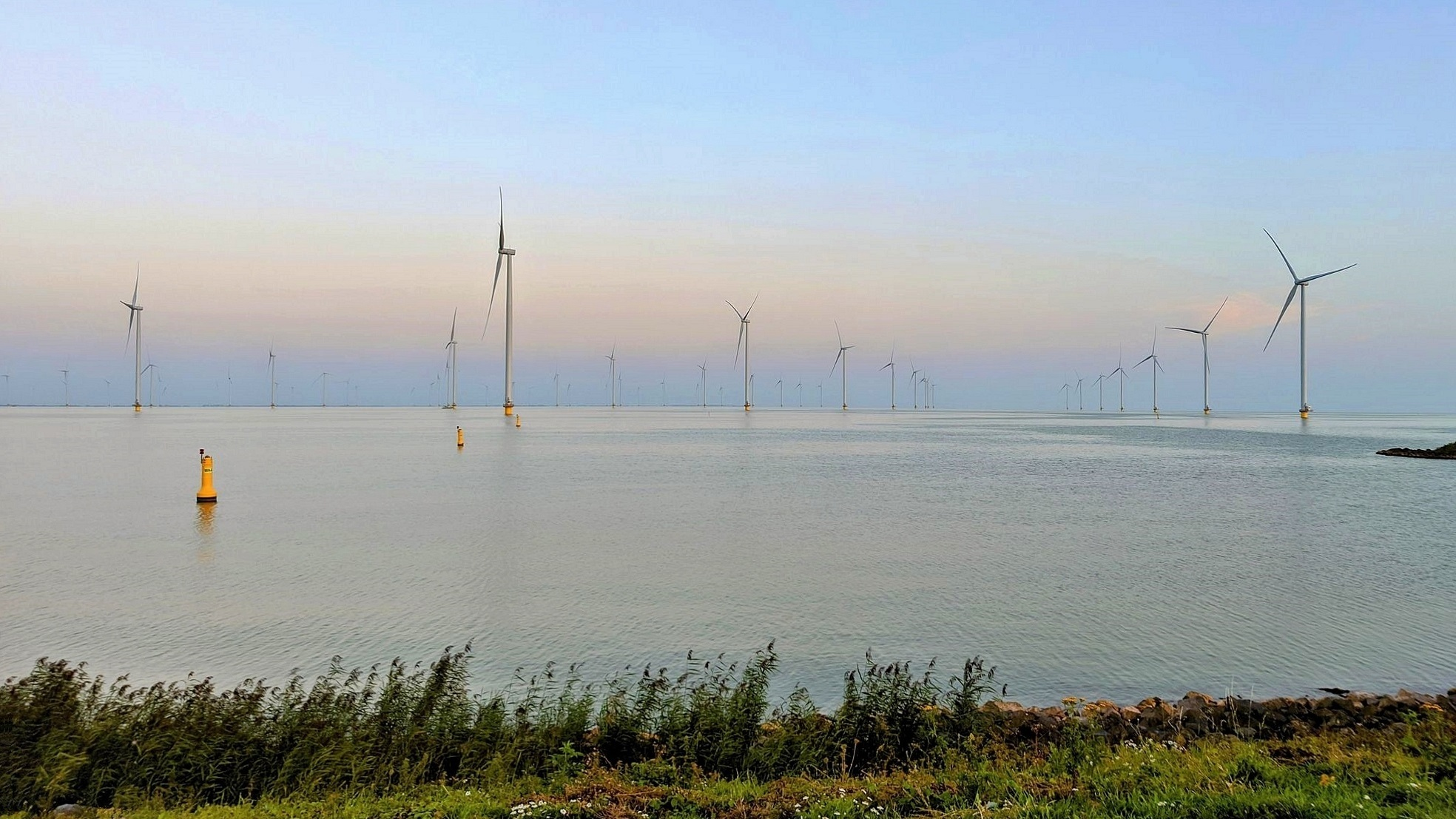
- Country: Netherlands
- Coordinates: 53°00′00″N 5°16′00″E
- Status: Operational
- Commission date: 2021

Wind farm
- Type: Offshore
- Rotor diameter: 130 m (430 ft)

Power generation
- Units operational: 89 × 4.3 MW
- Make and model: Siemens Gamesa Renewable Energy SWT-DD-130 (89)
- Nameplate capacity: 382.7 MW

External links
- Website: windparkfryslan.nl
- Commons: Related media on Commons

Wind farm layout

Windpark Fryslân is a near shore wind farm in the Frisian part of the IJsselmeer. The wind farm consists of 89 Siemens Gamesa wind turbines with a nameplate capacity of 4.3 megawatt (MW) each. At the time it was opened it was the largest lake based offshore wind farm in the world.

The wind farm is located south of the Afsluitdijk in the IJsselmeer to the east of Breezanddijk. The wind farm lies in the municipality of Súdwest Fryslân about 7 km from the Frisian coast. The shortest distance from the Afsluitdijk is around 600 meters. The distance between the wind turbines is around 660 meters.

== See also ==
- List of Offshore Wind Farms
- List of offshore wind farms in the Netherlands
- Wind power in the Netherlands
- Renewable energy in the Netherlands
