= Princess Amalia Wind Farm =

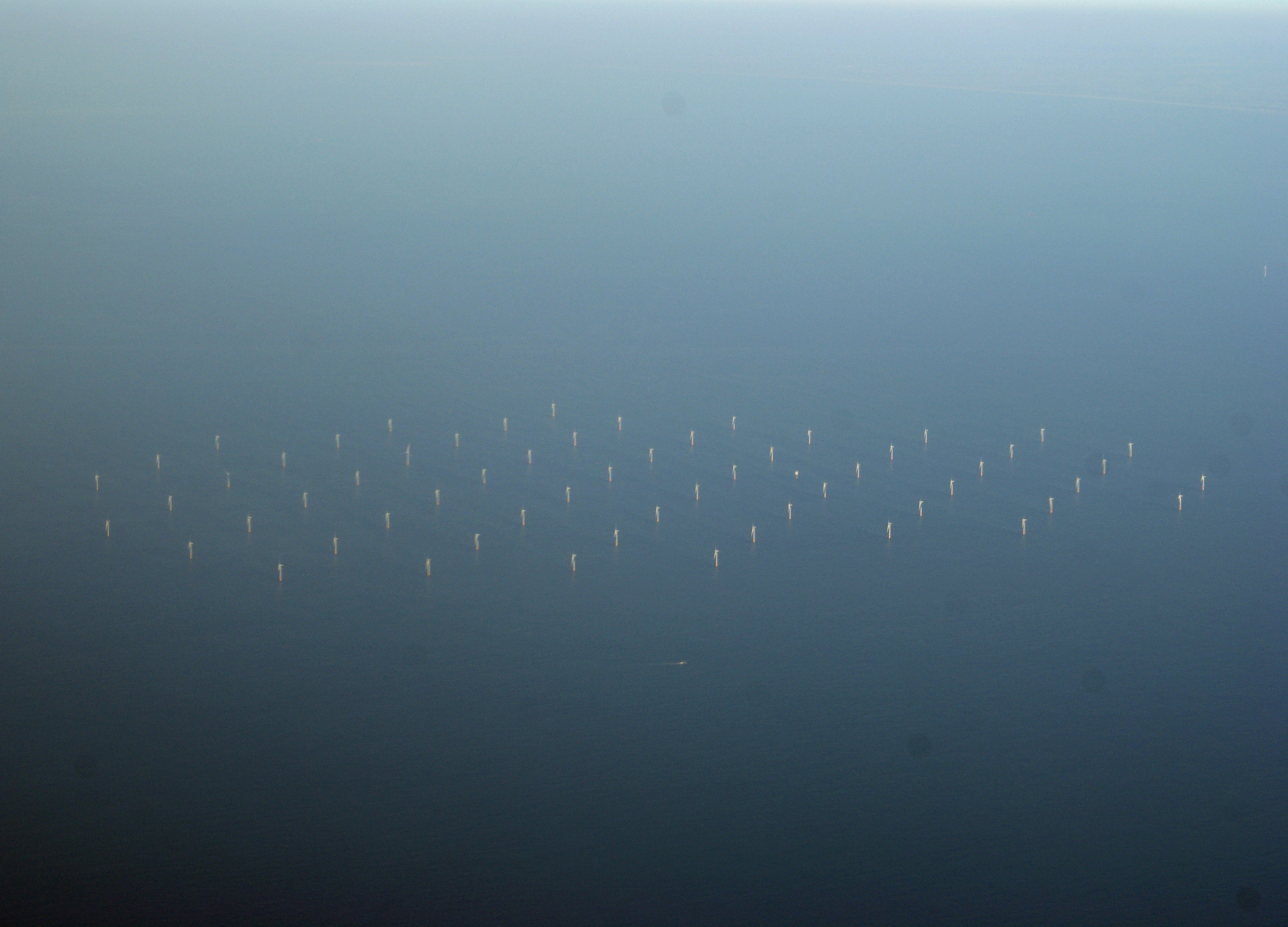
- Country: Netherlands
- Location: offshore of IJmuiden
- Coordinates: 52°35′22″N 4°12′23″E
- Status: Operational
- Commission date: 4 June 2008
- Owner: Eneco

Wind farm
- Type: Offshore
- Distance from shore: 23 km (14 mi)
- Hub height: 60 m (200 ft)
- Rotor diameter: 80 m (260 ft)

Power generation
- Units operational: 60 × 2 MW
- Make and model: Vestas V80 (60)
- Nameplate capacity: 120 MW

External links
- Commons: Related media on Commons

The Princess Amalia Wind Farm (Prinses Amaliawindpark in Dutch) is an offshore wind farm in the Netherlands. Prior to its official opening, it was known as the Q7 Wind Farm.

== Specifications ==
Wind farm layout

The wind farm lies approximately 23 km off the coast of IJmuiden. It consists of 60 Vestas V80-2.0MW wind turbines and has a total nameplate capacity of 120 MW. The wind turbine towers rest on steel monopile foundations, in water depths of 19 to 24 meters. Each monopile is a steel tube with diameter of about 4 meters, length of over 50 meters, weighing 320 tonnes, and driven 30 meters into the seabed. The construction barge Sea Jack required about 2 hours to drive in each monopile after positioning it.

== Development ==
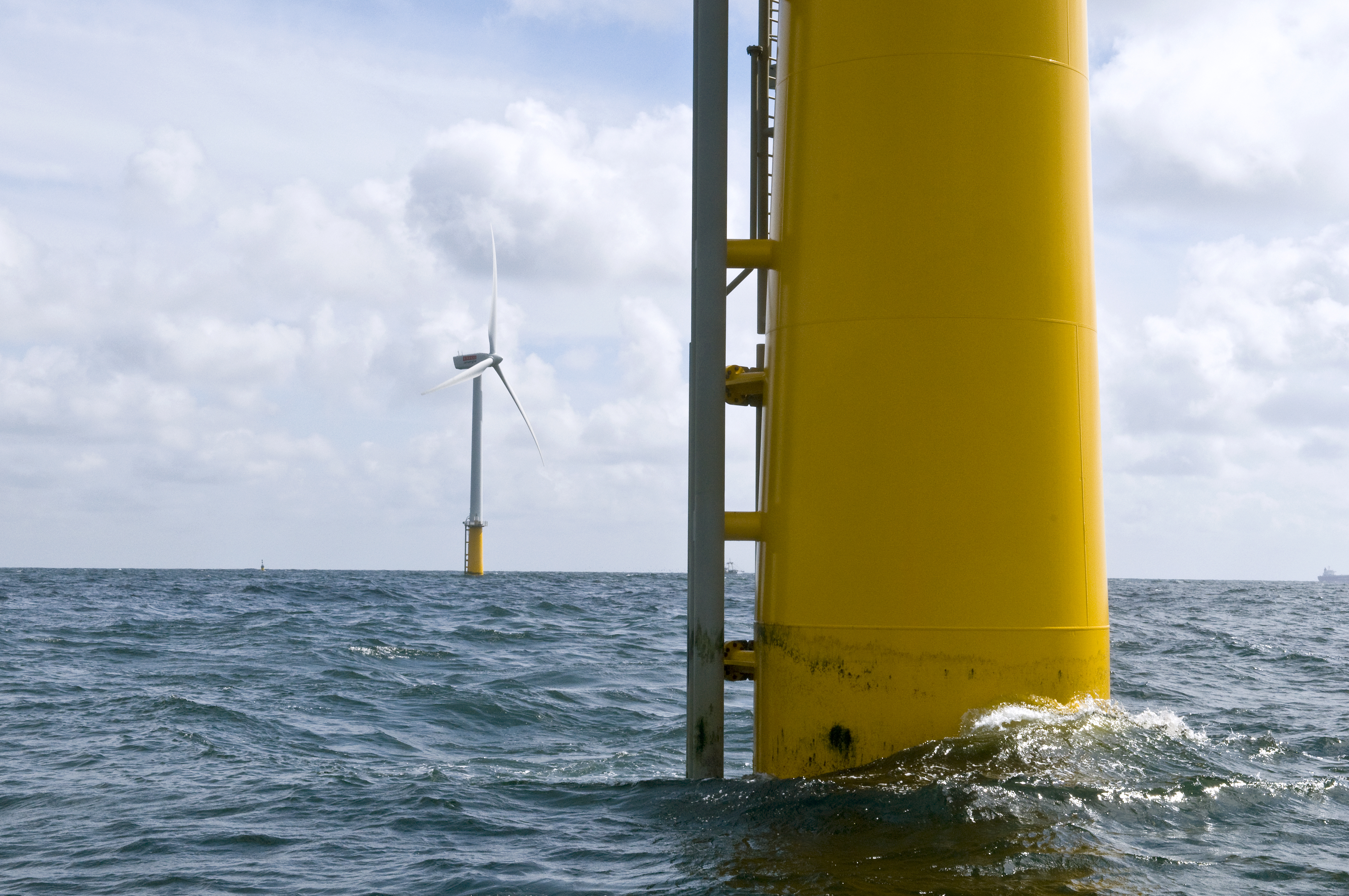
Close-up of the wind farm

Building this wind farm was an initiative of Eneco and Econcern. Upon completion, Eneco CEO Jeroen de Haas complained that the required procedures took seven years. By contrast, it only took two years to actually build. Project manager Bernard van Hemert stated that the long delay to obtain approval led to the project using a model of wind turbine (the Vestas V80-2MW) which was state-of-the-art at the start of project planning, but no longer the largest-capacity wind turbine on the market by the time of construction. (For example, the Thorntonbank Wind Farm off the adjacent Belgian coast uses larger 5 MW wind turbines from REpower.) However, the V80-2MW is considered a proven design with over 2700 units installed globally by 2008, thereby reducing the project risks.

The Princess Amalia Wind Farm was officially opened on June 4, 2008. It is named after Princess Amalia, Hereditary Princess of Orange.

== See also ==
- List of offshore wind farms
- List of offshore wind farms in the North Sea
- List of offshore wind farms in the Netherlands
- Wind power in the Netherlands
- Renewable energy in the Netherlands
