= Enercon E-126 =

Wind turbine model

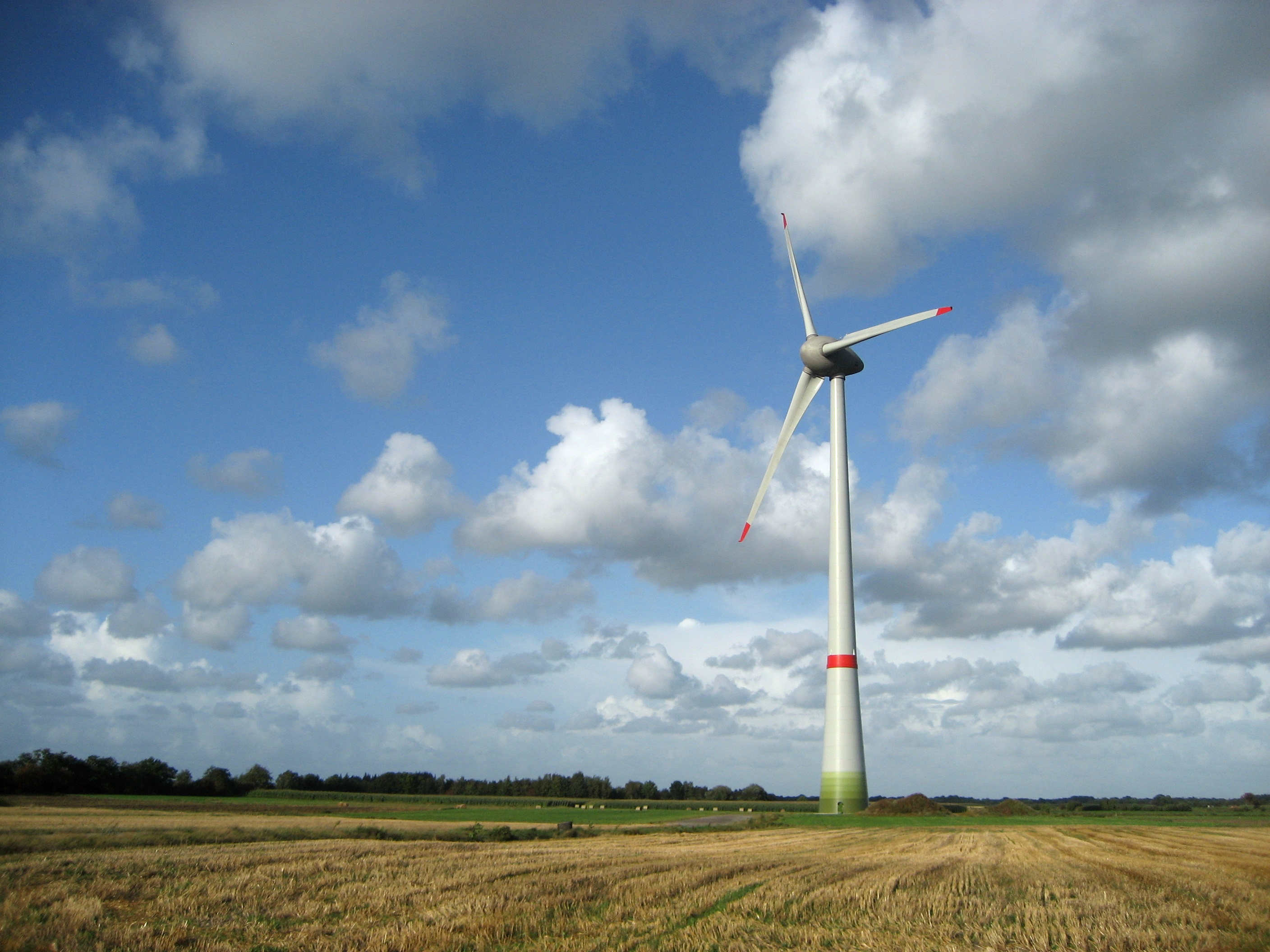
Enercon E-126 wind turbine.

The Enercon E-126 is an onshore wind turbine model manufactured by the German company Enercon. With a hub height of 135 m (443 ft), rotor diameter of 126 m (413 ft) and a total height of 198 m (650 ft), the turbine can generate up to 7.58 megawatts of power, making it the largest wind turbine in the world (by nameplate capacity) for several years, until it was overtaken in 2014 by the Danish company Vestas with their V164-8.0 turbine. Their model number is a reference to their rotor diameter.

== History ==
The project had come about after Enercon decided to pursue a larger turbine than the 2MW E-66. For some time, Enercon worked on the E-112 project - a turbine with a generator output of 2.25x the 2MW E-66, with it eventually being available for sale sometime in 2002. Enercon then tweaked the E-112's rotor diameter from 112m to 114m, for a slight benefit in efficiency. The turbine didn't sell well - only two 4.5 MW units exist as of today, which prompted Enercon to increase the generator output from 4.5 MW to 6 MW. However, while the generator power output increase did increase sales, by 2008 sales were essentially non-existent, due to two key factors:

- The fact that the wind turbines were extremely expensive to manufacture, transport and assemble,
- That Enercon was having to contend with ever-stiffening competition from fellow wind turbine builders, such as Senvion SE and Vestas Wind Systems A/S from Denmark.

Unfortunately for Enercon, the belief that the turbine's massive nameplate capacity would market itself to operators backfired, and it became a massive failure, with only 9 being ever installed, and this failure prompted Enercon to start tweaking the design. Enercon's new E-126 project, from the outset, didn't seem to be a massive change from the E-112, but rather an evolution of the model with a slightly higher hub height (135 m vs. 124 m) and a slightly larger rotor (diameter 127 m vs 112/114 m) with a new blade profile. For this new model, the sales were also slow, but sometime in 2011, Enercon increased the generator output from 6 MW to 7.58 MW. Sales then began to increase, with the first large-scale purchase of this wind turbine model at Estinnes wind farm in Belgium, with 11 wind turbines ordered for installation.

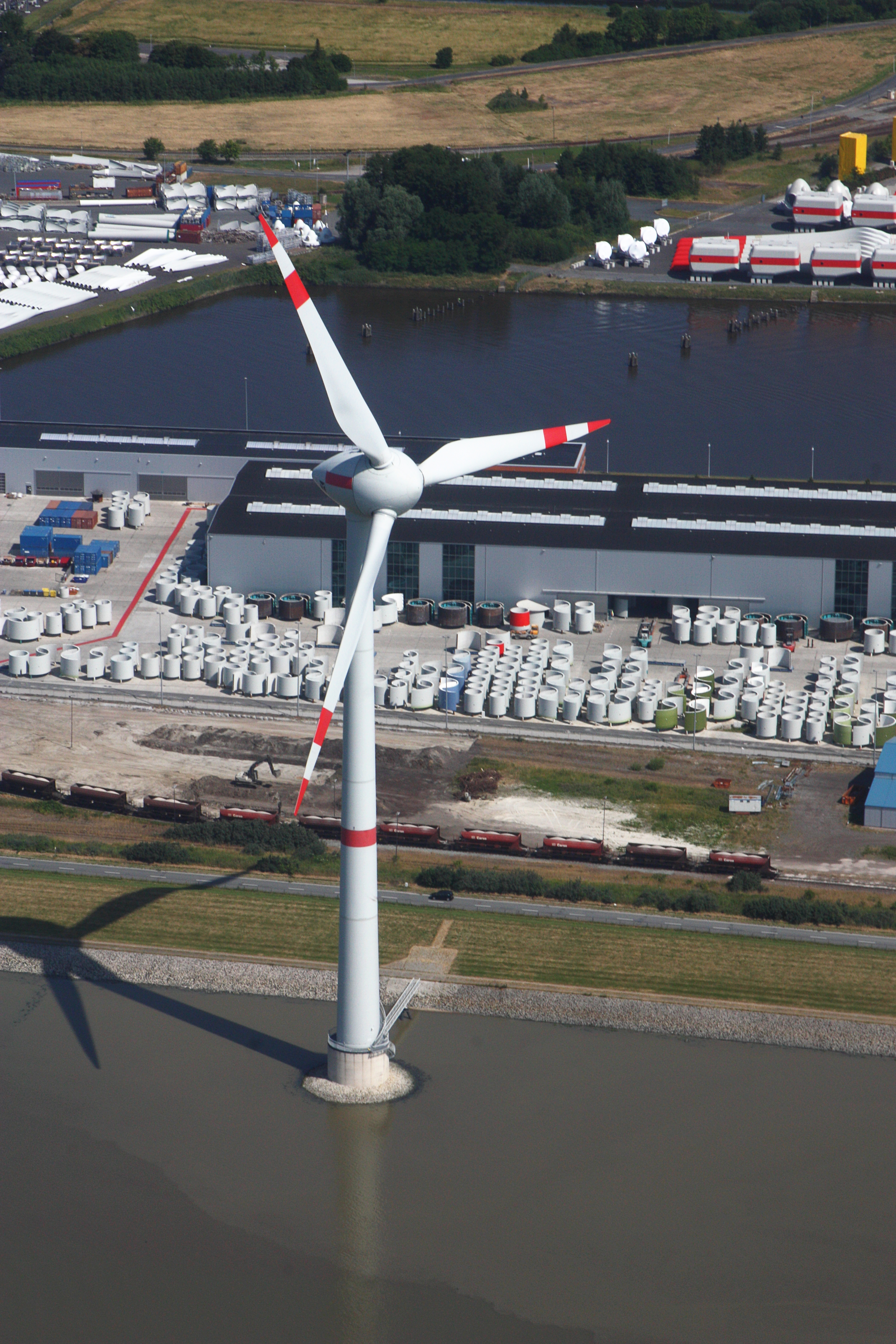
E-112, the predecessor to E-126. Note the different rotor blade profile.

== Specifications ==
There are three variants of the E-126, of which are: EP3 low-wind, EP4 mid-wind and EP8 high-wind models. For the sake of simplicity, this article focuses on the EP8 E-126. The power output of the generator was 6 MW, but has been uprated to 7.58 MW after technical revisions were performed in 2009. Since 2011 the E-126 is available as a 7.6 MW nameplate capacity. The E-126 incorporates power electronics and offers grid stabilising capabilities.

The weight of the foundation of the turbine tower is about 2,500 t, the tower itself 2,800 t, the machine housing 128 t, the generator 220 t, the rotor (including the blade) 364 t. The total weight is 6,012 tonnes exactly.

The first turbine of this model was installed in Emden, Germany in 2007, at Rysumer Nacken Wind Park. The list price of one unit is $14 million plus install costs.

== Market ==
In June 2012, at least 147 Enercon E-126 windturbines were operating, in construction, or nearing final approval, 35 of them completed and operating. Furthermore, during 2010-2011, onshore wind farm projects still in their early design processes were considering wind turbines of the 2-3.5 MW class, or wind turbines of the 5-8 MW class. This approach is at least applied in the Netherlands. Examples for this trend are found for instance in the preliminary research for the "Wind farm de Drentse Monden" aiming at 300-450 MW with possibly 50-60 E-126/7.5 MW turbines, "Wind farm N33" aiming at >120 MW with possibly 15-40 E-126/7.5 MW turbines, "Windpark Krammer" aiming at >100 MW with possibly 11-21 E-126/7.5 MW turbines, "Wind farm Wieringermeer" aiming 200-400 MW with possibly 60 or more 6+ MW turbines (in that case possibly Repower 6M/6.15MW).

=== Belgium: Estinnes wind farm ===
In September 2010, the world's first wind farm consisting entirely of Enercon E-126 turbines (11 turbines in total), was completed in Estinnes, Belgium. This wind farm is capable, at max capacity, to supply 55,000 residences with pure wind energy. This wind farm, though, has one 6 MW unit, so this reduces the wind farm's peak capacity from 83.38 MW to 81.8 MW.

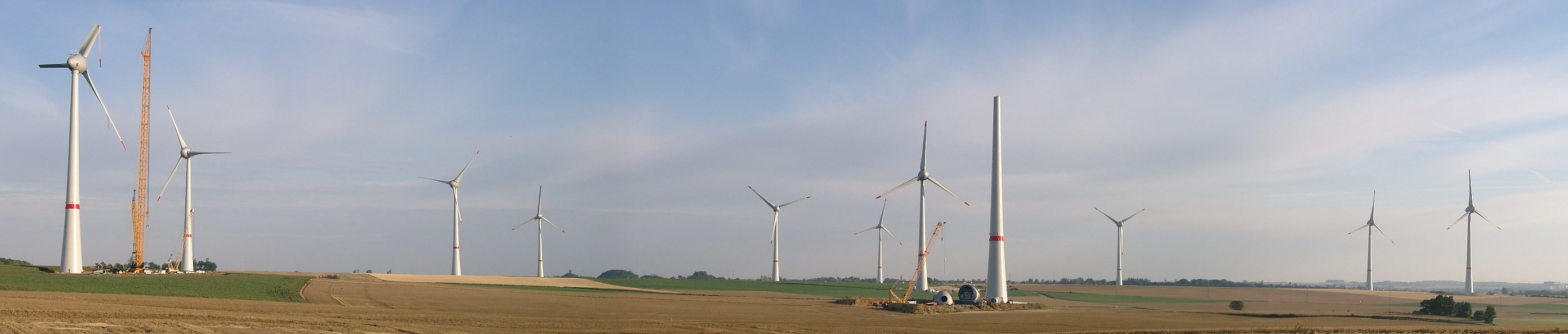
Wind farm consisting of ten 7.58 MW and one 6 MW Enercon E-126 turbines in Estinnes, Belgium as seen on 20 July 2010, two months before completion.

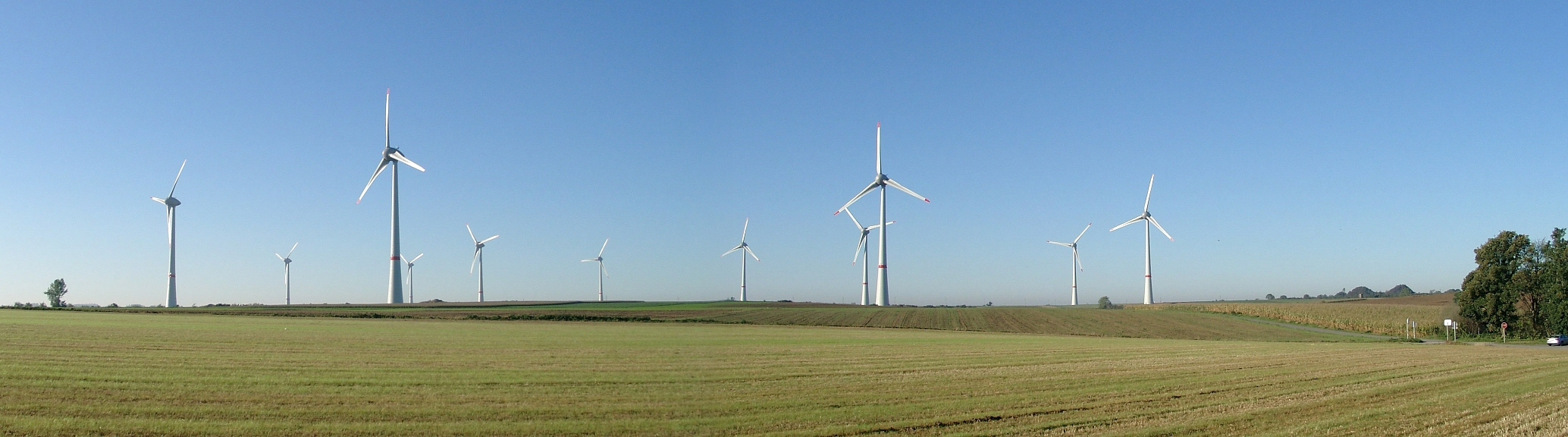
Wind farm Estinnes, Belgium, 10 October 2010, after completion.

=== Sweden: Markbygden Wind Farm ===
The Markbygden Wind Farm is planned to have 1,101 turbines covering 500 km^{2}, to generate 4,000 MW and an annual yield up to 12 TWh, making it one of the world's largest wind farms. Under construction in northern Sweden, it will contain a mix of Enercon E-126 7.58 MW wind turbines and Enercon E-101 3.05 MW wind turbines, the exact number of each type to be determined by further studies. The pilot stage wind farm at Dragaliden was completed in 2010, generating 24 MW with 12 turbines.

=== Netherlands: Windpark Noordoostpolder ===
The Netherlands government gave its final approval on 6 January 2011 for the 'Windpark Noordoostpolder, part of which would consist of 38 Enercon E-126 7.58 MW wind turbines. An ultimate case for the highest Court of state by opponents was closed on 8 February 2012, confirming the government decision. In 2011 it was expected preparatory works would start before the summer of 2012.

=== France: Wind Farm Le Mont des 4 Faux (Le Mont des 4 Faux Parc Éolien) ===
In France, a pending approval for the wind farm 'Le Mont des 4 Faux', consisting of an initial number of 52 Enercon E-126 7.58 MW wind turbines but in April 2012 reduced to a new variant of 47 turbines (deleting one 5-unit row in order to meet some ornithological concerns), is considered to be confirmed as such 47 turbines wind farm in 2012. This E-126 wind farm is situated between Juniville and Machault, at the southern side of the French Ardennes, near Reims. The project developer is the company Windvision.

== See also ==
- Record-holding turbines
