= Windpark Noordoostpolder =

Onshore and near-shore wind farm in Flevoland, the Netherlands

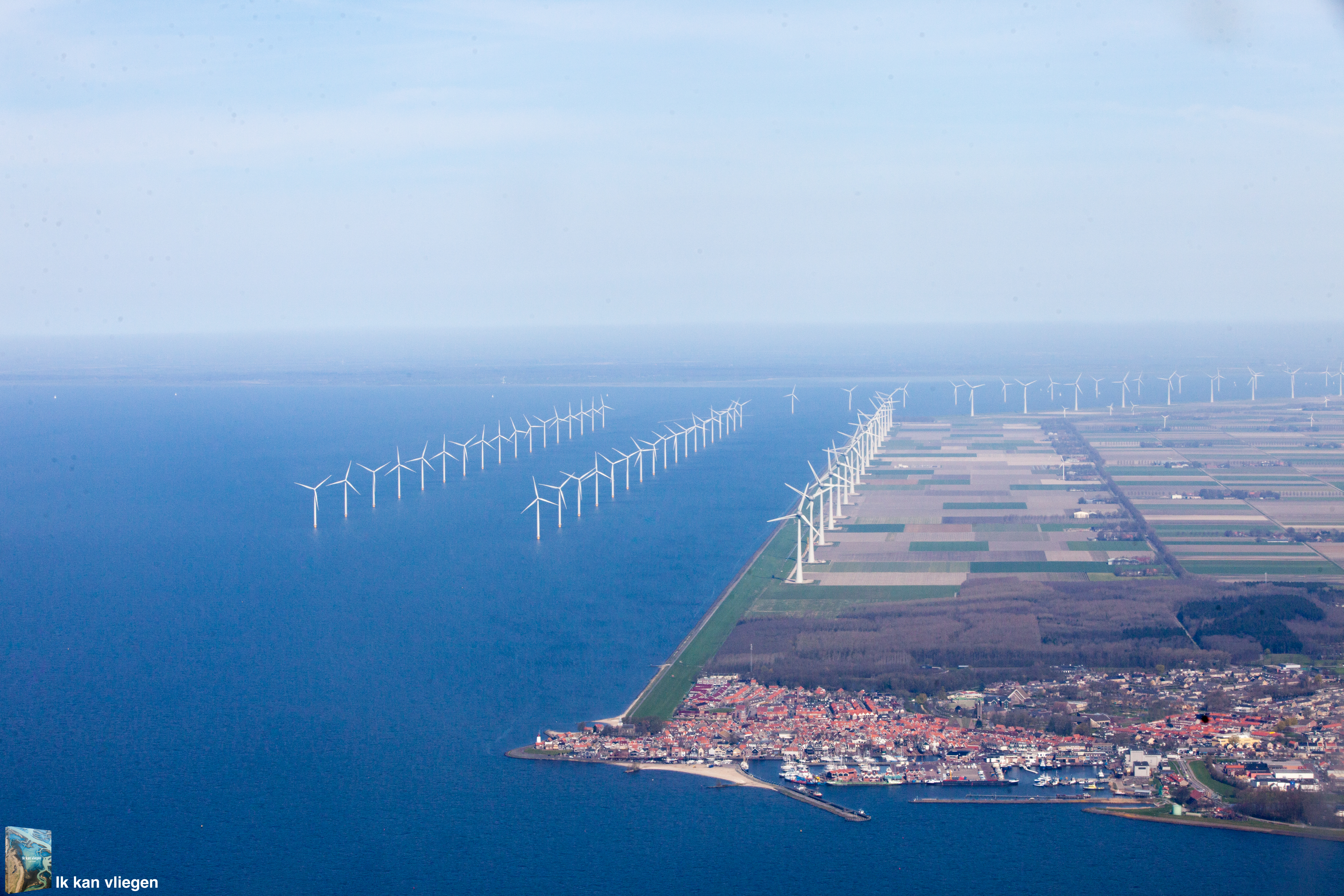
- Country: Netherlands
- Location: IJsselmeer, North East Polder, Flevoland
- Coordinates: 52.721°N 5.583°E
- Status: Operational
- Construction began: 2012
- Commission date: 2017
- Construction cost: 1 billion euros
- Owners: Koepel Windenergie Nordoostpolder and Innogy

Wind farm
- Type: Near-shore (Siemens); Onshore (Enercon)
- Max. water depth: 3–6 m (10–20 ft)
- Distance from shore: 0.5 km (0.3 mi)
- Site area: 8 km^{2} (3.1 sq mi)

Power generation
- Units operational: 48 x 3 MW (near-shore); 38 x 7.5 MW (onshore); 86 turbines in total
- Make and model: Siemens Wind Power: 3.0DD-108; Enercon: E-126
- Nameplate capacity: 429 MW

External links
- Commons: Related media on Commons

Windpark Noordoostpolder is an onshore and near-shore wind farm in Flevoland, the Netherlands. Upon completion in 2017, it was the largest wind farm in the Netherlands, and as of 2019 it is still one of the largest. Owner-operators are members of the Koepel Windenergie Noordoostpolder, a partnership of more than 100 agricultural entrepreneurs from the North East Polder (Noordoostpolder), and Innogy, a subsidiary of German energy company RWE.

== Planning ==
The Netherlands government gave its final approval for the project on 6 January 2011. The following year (8 February 2012), a ruling by the Council of State on an appeal brought before them by opponents of the wind park confirmed the government decision. Construction of access roads began in May 2012, and power grid operator TenneT began in June 2012 with expansion of the 110 kV transport network in order to connect the wind farm. A stone guided dam with a flora and fauna area was constructed, which serves as a shipping lane to safely divert shipping around the wind farm. Subsequently, the construction activity started on shore in 2013 and near shore in 2014.

The wind farm is located along the dikes of the IJsselmeer on the western side of the North East Polder. A total of 86 wind turbines have been erected; 48 are sited near-shore (Siemens, 3 MW) and 38 onshore (Enercon E-126, 7.5 MW), for a combined generating capacity of 429 megawatts. The wind farm produces 1.4 TWh of electricity annually, enough to provide electricity to some 400,000 households. This is roughly the number of households in the two adjacent provinces of Flevoland and Friesland.

Before the wind park was completed there were 55 older wind turbines in the same area: 50 along the Westermeerdijk and another 5 on and near the Zuidermeerdijk. The new wind farm generates significantly more energy than the previous wind farm, thanks to improved wind turbine technology. One new onshore wind turbine provides as much electricity as the previous 50 Westermeerdijk wind turbines put together. The older wind turbines were dismantled once the new farm was completed.

== Wind farms ==
Westermeerwind NOP Agrowind Zuidwester

=== Westermeerwind ===
The Westermeerwind wind farm is a near-shore facility off the coast of the municipality of Noordoostpolder. A total of 48 wind turbines of type Siemens 3.0DD-108 (capacity of 3 MW each) have been placed in water depths of 3–7 meters. The combined capacity of the turbines is 144 MW. Construction of the offshore work began in 2014, with commissioning carried out in two phases in 2015 and 2016.

=== NOP Agrowind ===
The majority of the onshore wind turbines are operated by NOP Agrowind. There are 26 wind turbines of type Enercon E-126, which have a nominal output of 7.5 MW each. The combined capacity of the turbines is 195 MW. Each turbine is next to the Westermeerdijk (Western Sea Dike) or the Noordermeerdijk (Northern Sea Dike) close to the near-shore turbines. The first turbine was commissioned in August 2014 and the wind farm was completed in 2016.

=== Zuidwester ===
The Zuidwester wind farm comprises 12 Enercon E-126 turbines with a combined capacity of 90 MW. As in the northern parts of the Noordoostpolder, the turbines are right next to the dike. The operator of the wind farm is RWE. The first turbines were installed in 2015, and Zuidwester came on stream in 2017.

== See also ==
- Wind power in the Netherlands
- Renewable energy in the Netherlands
