= Hollandse Kust Zuid Offshore Wind Farm =

Offshore wind farm in the North Sea

Hollandse Kust Zuid
- Image of wind farm site from Copernicus Sentinel-1
- Country: Netherlands
- Coordinates: 52°22′00″N 4°07′00″E
- Status: Operational
- Construction began: 2021
- Commission date: 2023
- Owners: Allianz; BASF; Vattenfall
- Operator: Vattenfall

Wind farm
- Type: Offshore
- Max. water depth: 28 m (92 ft)
- Distance from shore: 18.5 km (11.5 mi)
- Hub height: 125 m (410 ft)
- Rotor diameter: 200 m (660 ft)
- Site area: 225 km^{2} (87 sq mi)

Power generation
- Units planned: 139 × 11 MW
- Units cancelled: 1 × 11 MW
- Nameplate capacity: 1,529 MW

External links
- Website: vattenfall-hollandsekust.nl
- Commons: Related media on Commons

Hollandse Kust Zuid Wind Farm (officially Hollandse Kust (Zuid) Wind Farm Zone) is an offshore wind farm being built in the Dutch part of the North Sea. The farms consists of 4 sites and 2 wind farms. Both farms are developed by Vattenfall as a single project. The farm will have a total installed capacity of 1529 MW. The farm consists of 139 Siemens Gamesa 11.0-200 DD wind turbines with a capacity of 11 MW each. It encompasses the Eneco Luchterduinen offshore wind farm from the southwest, southeast and northwest.

Construction of the farm started in June 2021. The last wind turbine was installed on 13 June 2023. The wind farm was inaugurated by king Willem Alexander on 29 September 2023. The wind farm is expected to be fully operational in 2024.

Originally 140 wind turbines were planned. In January 2022 (while the wind farm was still being built) bulk carrier Julietta D lost power during a storm and became rudderless. It collided with one of the wind turbine foundations and one of the two offshore substations. The jacket of the substation suffered only minor damage. The monopile however was damaged beyond repair. The damaged foundation will be removed in 2024.

A seaweed farm opened in 2024.

== Wind Farms ==
Wind farm layout

=== Hollandse Kust (Zuid) I & II ===
The tender for this farm was held in December 2017. Chinook, a subsidiary of Vattenfall, was announced the winner on 19 March 2018. The wind farm has a total capacity of 770 MW.

=== Hollandse Kust (Zuid) III & IV ===
The tender for the second farm was held in March 2019. Vattenfall was announced the winner on 10 July 2019. The wind farm will also have a capacity of 770 MW.

== See also ==
- List of Offshore Wind Farms
- List of offshore wind farms in the North Sea
- List of offshore wind farms in the Netherlands
- Wind power in the Netherlands
- Renewable energy in the Netherlands
