= Hollandse Kust Noord Offshore Wind Farm =

Dutch offshore wind farm

Hollandse Kust Noord
- Country: Netherlands
- Coordinates: 52°42′54″N 4°15′04″E
- Status: Operational
- Construction began: 15 October 2022
- Commission date: 20 December 2023
- Owners: Eneco; Shell plc

Wind farm
- Type: Offshore
- Distance from shore: 18.5 km (11.5 mi)
- Hub height: 125.5 m (412 ft)
- Rotor diameter: 200 m (660 ft)
- Rated wind speed: 9.57 m/s (31.4 ft/s)
- Site area: 92 km^{2} (36 sq mi)

Power generation
- Units operational: 69 × 11 MW
- Make and model: Siemens Gamesa SG 11.0-200 DD (69)
- Nameplate capacity: 759 MW

External links
- Website: www.crosswindhkn.nl

Wind farm layout

Hollandse Kust Noord Wind Farm (officially Hollandse Kust (Noord) Wind Farm Zone) is an offshore wind farm in the Dutch part of the North sea. The wind farm zone consists of a single site. The farm will consist of 69 wind turbines with a capacity of 11 MW each and will have a total output of 759 MW.

Construction on the farm started in October 2022. The last of the monopile foundation was installed in February 2023 and the first wind turbine was installed in April 2023. The farm was originally expected to be fully operational by the end of 2023. The final turbine was installed in October 2023, and final operational notification was granted in June 2024.

== See also ==
- List of Offshore Wind Farms
- List of offshore wind farms in the North Sea
- List of offshore wind farms in the Netherlands
- Wind power in the Netherlands
- Renewable energy in the Netherlands
