= Gemini Wind Farm =

Dutch offshore wind farm in the North Sea

Gemini
- Country: Netherlands
- Location: 85 km north of Groningen
- Coordinates: 54°02′10″N 5°57′47″E
- Status: Operational
- Commission date: 8 May 2017
- Owners: Alte Leipziger – Hallesche; HVC; Northland Power; SAG

Wind farm
- Type: Offshore
- Distance from shore: 55 km (34 mi)
- Rotor diameter: 130 m (430 ft)

Power generation
- Units operational: 150 × 4 MW
- Make and model: Siemens Gamesa Renewable Energy SWT-4.0-130 (150)
- Nameplate capacity: 600 MW

External links
- Website: geminiwindfarm.com

Gemini is a 600 megawatt (MW) offshore wind farm off the coast of the Netherlands. Construction started in 2015 with final commissioning in 2017. At the time of completion it was the second largest offshore wind farm on Earth after the London Array.

Wind farm layout

The wind farm consists of two parts. The first part with 75 turbines is located north of Ameland. The second part also with 75 turbines is located 55 kilometres north of Schiermonnikoog. The 150 wind turbines are Siemens SWT-4.0, each with a capacity of 4 megawatts.

The wind farm has been developed by a consortium led by Northland Power, while Van Oord is the main contractor. Initially it was expected that the wind farm would be ready in the fourth quarter of 2015, but the start of construction was delayed until 2015. Electricity production started in February 2016 when the first turbine was connected to the grid. In the first week of December 2016, all 150 turbines began producing power, and the project was fully commissioned in May 2017.

The total construction cost of the Gemini project is estimated at 2.8 billion euros, and subsidies will be 3.6 billion euros.

Gemini has licences to operate the wind farm for 20 years. After this period, the wind farm and everything that has been introduced onto the seabed must be removed. A bank security of 40 million euros has been made available for this.

The first offshore service vessel with inverted bow and X-Stern was launched by Ulstein Group in April 2016 to service Gemini, housing 40 workers.

== See also ==
- Wind power in the Netherlands
- List of offshore wind farms
- List of offshore wind farms in the Netherlands
- List of offshore wind farms in the North Sea
