= Econcern =

Econcern was an international holding company, consisted of five operating companies: Ecofys, Evelop, Ecostream, Ecoventures, and OneCarbon. These companies delivered solutions for renewable energy (solar energy, wind energy, bioenergy) and carbon credits, it was with a mission to "ensure a sustainable energy supply for everyone". Econcern employed 1,200 professionals in over 20 countries across the world.

== Bankruptcy ==
In May 2009, Econcern filed for Dutch Chapter 11 for suspension of payments, the first step towards bankruptcy, after it failed to agree on refinancing terms on a €150 million corporate loan which matured on April 1st, 2009. An administrator was appointed by a Dutch court to work with the board to try to identify new financing solutions. At stake were assets under development, such as the Belwind and Gode Wind I offshore wind farms, as well as operational assets, such as Q7. The company went bankrupt in Q3 2009.
