= Windpark Krammer =

Wind farm in Zeeland, Netherlands

Coordinates: 51.659722°N 4.163139°E

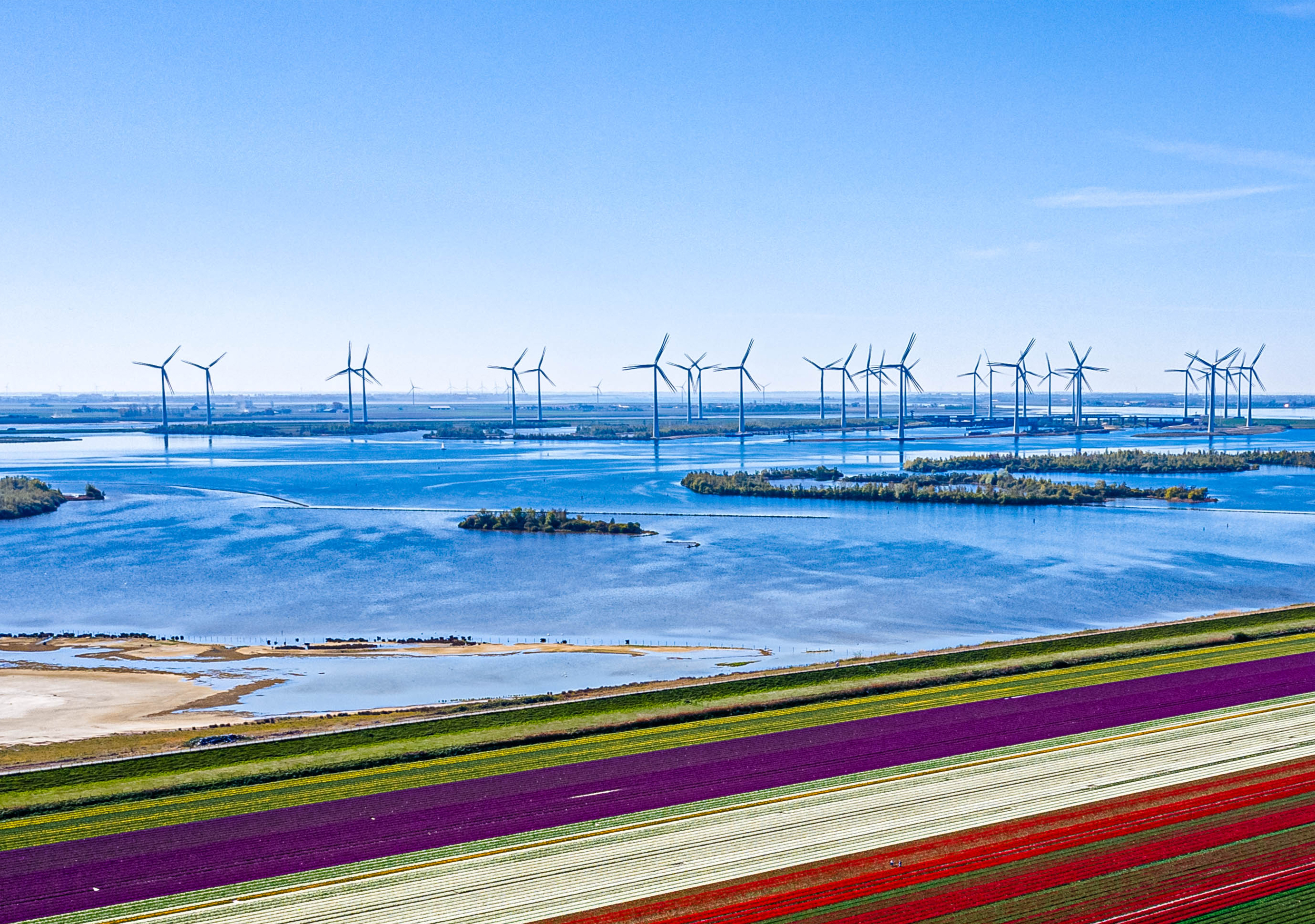
Land view with flower farm in the foreground

Windpark Krammer is a wind farm in Zeeland, the Netherlands, next to the Philipsdam.

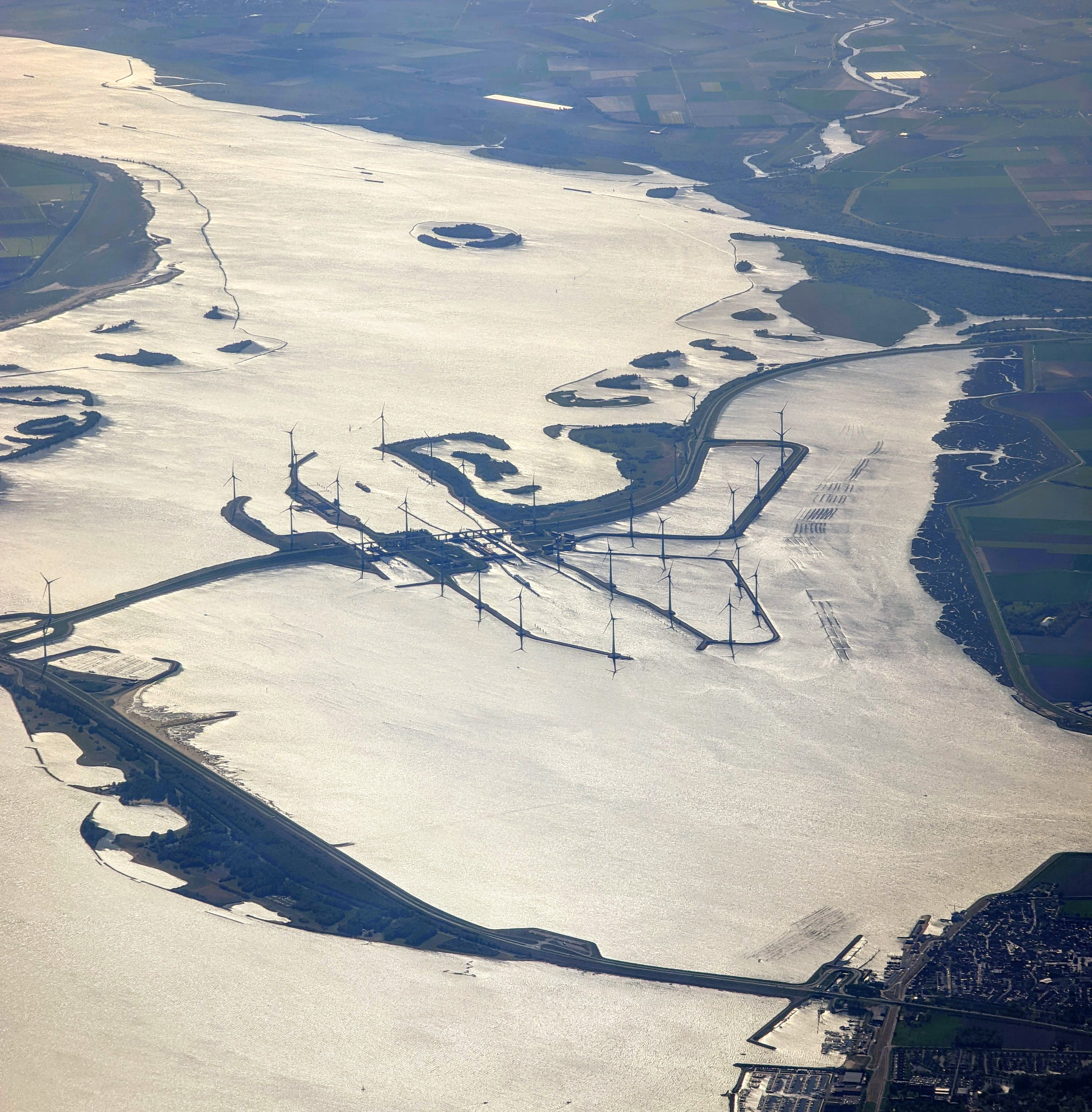
Aerial view

The wind farm was created by an alliance of two local cooperatives.
