= Renewable energy in the Netherlands =

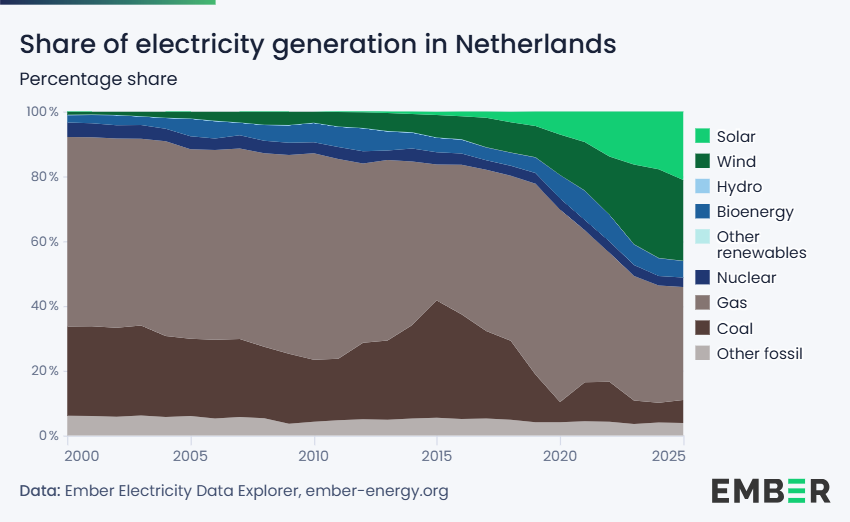
Netherlands electricity generation by source

Despite the historic usage of wind power to drain water and grind grain, the Netherlands today lags 21 of the 26 other member states of the European Union in the consumption of energy from renewable sources. In 2022, the Netherlands consumed just 15% of its total energy from renewables. According to statistics published by Eurostat, it was the last among the EU countries in the shift away from global warming-inducing energy sources. The leading renewable sources in the country are biomass, wind, solar and both geothermal and aerothermal power (mostly from ground source and air source heat pumps). In 2018 decisions were made to replace natural gas as the main energy source in the Netherlands with increased electrification being a major part of this process.

The low take up of renewable energy may be partially explained by the flat and often sub-sea level landscape and subsequent limits to hydropower resources, although hydro poor resource countries such as Denmark have still managed to make renewables the focus of their energy needs. In 2022, Dutch wind turbines had a total nameplate capacity of 8,831 MW, accounting for 4,20% of final energy consumption. As of 2022, a number of large offshore windfarms have either come online (Gemini wind farm) are planned or have been granted authorisation (145,628 GWh). The total average capacity of the current offshore windfarms is 10,169 GWh. Most of the tiny contribution made to electricity generation by hydroelectricity came from three power plants.

A large part of the renewable electricity sold in the Netherlands comes from Norway, a country which generates almost all its electricity from hydropower plants. In the Netherlands, household consumers can choose to buy renewable electricity. The relative amount of renewable energy used by household users has been steadily increasing, rising from 38% in 2008 to 80% in 2020.

One area in which the Netherlands is a relative leader is in the adoption of electric plug in vehicles. In 2022 plug-in electric vehicles in the Netherlands represented 10,7% of cars owned, making it the world's second highest share after Norway. Electric vehicles are able to run on renewable electricity with lower emissions and have the potential to provide grid power storage facilities.

== Historical trends ==
Total energy production by source in the Netherlands (1990–2021, in petajoules)

=== Early development in overall renewable energy ===
Total renewable energy use was just 1.1% of overall energy use in 1990. This increased to 7.4% in 2018. The electricity sector first overtook the heating and cooling sector in 2005 in terms of total renewable energy use.

Renewable energy in the Netherlands (by use, in TWh)
	1990	1995	2000	2005	2006	2007	2008	2009	2010
Electricity	0.81	1.4	2.86	7.44	7.86	7.33	9.22	10.8	11.7
Heat	5.00	5.25	5.28	6.86	7.56	8.08	8.67	9.36	9.61
Transport	0	0	0	0.03	0.50	3.61	3.33	4.33	2.67
Total	5.81	6.69	8.17	14.3	15.9	19.0	21.2	24.5	24.0
Renewable percent of total use	1.1%	1.2%	1.4%	2.3%	2.6%	3.1%	3.4%	4.1%	3.7%
Note: Rounding errors may be present due to conversion from original source reported in PJ

=== Recent trends in renewable energy ===
All EU countries along with Iceland and Norway submitted National Renewable Energy Action Plans (NREAPs) to outline the steps taken, and projected progress by each country between 2010 and 2020 to meet the Renewable Energy Directive targets for each country. Each plan contains a detailed breakdown of each country's current renewable energy usage and plans for future developments. According to projections by the Dutch submission in 2020 the gross final energy consumption in the Netherlands by sector breaks down as follows:

Projected energy use by sector in 2020	ktoe	RE 2020 target
Heating and cooling	24,989	8.7%
Electricity	11,681	37.0%
Transport	10,634	10.3%
Gross final energy consumption*	52,088	14.5%

*After adjustments.

Using the unadjusted NREAP data approximately half of energy consumption (52.8%) is used in the heating and cooling sector. The heating and cooling sector (also known as the thermal sector) includes domestic heating and air conditioning, industrial processes such as furnaces and any use of heat generally. The next largest share is the electricity sector at 24.7%, followed by the transport sector at 22.5%. Total annual energy consumption before adjustments for aviation is projected to be 52,088 ktoe (52.million tonnes of oil equivalent) by 2020.

The Netherlands has a minimum target of 14% of renewable energy use by 2020. The sectoral targets for 2020 break down into national targets of 8.7% in the heating and cooling sector, 37% in the electricity sector and 10.3% in the transport sector although these figures may be slightly different from those implied by the minimum trajectory path. The following table shows the actual results recorded of renewable energy use by sector:

Renewable energy by sector 2009-2022
	2009	2010	2011	2012	2013	2014	2015	2016	2017	2018	2019	2020	2021	2022
Heating and cooling sector	3.4%	3.1%	3.7%	3.9%	4.1%	5.2%	5.5%	5.5%	5.9%	6.1%	7.2%	8.1%	7.8%	8.6%
Electricity sector	9.1%	9.6%	9.8%	10.4%	10.0%	10.0%	11.1%	12.5%	13.8%	15.1%	18.2%	26.4%	33.3%	39.9%
Transport sector	4.5%	3.3%	4.8%	4.9%	5.1%	6.2%	5.3%	4.6%	5.9%	9.6%	12.3%	12.6%	9.0%	10.8%
Total consumption	4.3%	3.9%	4.5%	4.7%	4.8%	5.5%	5.8%	6.0%	6.6%	7.4%	8.9%	11.4%	13.0%	15.0%
Total consumption including statistical transfers from other EU members (Note: A statistical transfer is the administrative purchase by one European member state of a quantity of renewable energy from another member state that has achieved its target and has a surplus. Such a transfer does not involve any physical flow of renewable energy)	4.3%	3.9%	4.5%	4.7%	4.8%	5.5%	5.8%	6.0%	6.6%	7.4%	8.9%	14.0%	13.0%	15.0%

Actual overall renewable energy use grew from 4.3% in 2009 to 5.5% by 2014. The minimum trajectory planned for 2013–2014 was 5.9% and for 2015–2016 7.6% of total energy use. The Netherlands is regarded as amongst the most likely countries to miss 2020 national renewable energy targets as outlined by the Renewable Energy Directive.

== Energy consumption by sector ==
Projected total gross final energy consumption by sector in 2020
1. Heating and cooling (52.8%)
2. Electricity (24.7%)
3. Transport (22.5%)

=== Electricity ===
Total electricity production by source in the Netherlands, in TWh

Percentage of electricity generated from renewables in the Netherlands, by source

In 2023, 47.8% of electricity generation in the Netherlands came from renewable sources, up from 9.5% in 2010 and 3.4% in 2000.

Current Dutch government policy is, through the use of renewable sources and nuclear power, aiming for zero-emission electricity generation by 2035.

== Renewable energy sources ==
Installed wind power in the Netherlands
Year	Cumulative capacity (in MW)
2001	481
2002	682
2003	908
2004	1,078
2005	1,224
2006	1,561
2007	1,749
2008	2,149
2009	2,225
2010	2,218
2011	2,272
2012	2,391
2013	2,713
2014	2,865
2015	3,431
2016	4,328
2017	4,341
2018	4,393
2019	4,484
2020	6,619
2021	7,800

=== Wind power ===
2016 was a record year for new wind turbine installations totalling 887 MW bringing the totalled installed capacity to 4,328 MW by year end. 691 MW of the new installations were offshore. The Dutch government has a target of 6,000 MW of onshore wind power by 2020 and 4,450 MW of offshore wind power by 2023.

In 2017, the Netherlands had 2294 wind turbines. The wind capacity installed at end 2017 will, in a normal wind year, produced 9% of electricity, when the equivalent value for Germany was 16.1% and Portugal 14%.

In 2022 the Netherlands announced it increased its offshore wind target to 21 GW by 2030. That would meet approximately 75% of the countries electricity needs. With this, offshore wind energy makes an important contribution to achieving the increased climate target of 55% less CO_{2}-emissions.

=== Solar power ===
By 2017 year end cumulative installed capacity of solar PV power reached a preliminary estimate of 2,749 MW with 700 MW added in that year alone. Whilst the Netherlands saw its capacity grow by the fourth highest in Europe during 2017 its installed capacity per inhabitant remained relatively low at 160.9 Watts per inhabitant compared to the European average of 208.3 Watts per inhabitant.

=== Biomass ===
Sources of biomass in the Netherlands include the biogenic fraction of waste that is burned in waste incineration plants. Waste wood is also collected for use in the Netherlands and other EU countries. Manure is used to produce biogas and wood pellets are co-fired in electricity plants. 590 kton of pellets were imported, mostly from the United States of America and around 140 kton from Dutch sources contributing 12 to 13 PJ of primary energy to co-firing in energy plants in 2013–2014. Biofuels are produced in the Netherlands for both domestic and export markets.

Rapeseed and maize crops were hardly used in 2014 to produce biofuels in Holland with reasons cited being the high price of corn and resistance to using food crops for fuel production. Rapeseed is used for well over 1% of the imported biofuels (biodiesel) while corn is used for 11% (bioethanol). Germany was the largest supplier of rape seed in 2014 (53%), followed by Romania (13%). For maize the largest supplier in 2014 was Ukraine (39%), followed by France (24%). Some maize fodder is fermented for biofuel production in Holland.

Biomass gross final consumption (TJ) by energy sector, 2013 (data extract)
	Electricity	Heat	Transport	Total
Waste incineration plants	7 473	11 053		18 526
Co-firing of biomass in power stations	6 531	417		6 948
Decentralised electricity production from solid biomass and bioliquid	3 904	1 436		5 340
Total biomass boilers for heating in businesses		5 474		5 474
Wood-fired boilers for heating in businesses		4 038		4 038
Non-wood-fired boilers for heating in businesses		1 436		1 436
Total biomass in domestic use		17 910		17 910
Wood-burning stoves for domestic use		17 640		17 640
Charcoal for domestic consumption		270		270
Total biogas	3 741	5 794	1	9 535
Biogas from landfills	222	233	0	455
Biogas from wastewater treatment plants	699	1 341	-	2 040
Biogas, co-firing of manure	1 891	1 798	-	3 689
Other biogas	929	2 422	1	3 351
Total liquid biofuels for transport		*802	12 122	12 924
Bioethanol			5 210	5 210
Biodiesel		*802	6 912	7 714
Total biomass	21 649	42 886	12 123	76 657
- *The consumption of biofuels for mobile vehicles in the construction and farming sectors are assigned to the heat sector due to statistical definitions.

Biomass produced 76,657 TJ of energy for final consumption in 2013. The largest share was destined for the heat sector at 42,886TJ followed by the electricity sector at 21, 649T J and then the transport sector with 12,123TJ.

=== Hydroelectricity ===
Due to its flat landscape the Netherlands has only very limited hydroelectric resources. In 2014 hydroelectricity produced just 112 Gwh of power out of a total electricity production from all sources of 103,418 GWh.

=== Heat Pumps ===
− An interesting source of heat recovery used in the Netherlands is sourced from freshly milked milk, or warm milk. However at 0.3% of total renewable energy production (2010 figures) this source is not likely to accelerate energy transition in the country. Warm milk is still not mentioned in the EU Renewable Energy Directive, nor in international energy statistics and so is not included is gross final consumption figures. It does however provide Dutch farmers with plenty of hot water.

− In 2010, 740,000 dairy cows (about half of the country's total) provided 277 TJ of heat energy avoiding 18,000 tons of CO_{2} emissions. According to industry sources for every litre of milk cooled, 0.7 litres of warm water is produced. Water pumped through the plate heat exchanger reaches 50 °C to 55 °C. The energy recovered from 1000 litres of milk per day over a year generates heat equal to: 13,100 kWh of electrical energy, 1,900 litres of oil, 1,650 m³ of natural gas or 950 kg of propane gas.

== Climate change ==
In 2008 Prime Minister Jan Peter Balkenende claimed that the Netherlands annually uses €1–1.5 billion (0.3% of national income) to protect against the risks of the sea level rise. Many areas are under sea level in the Netherlands and are protected by dam and dikes. In 2010 the Netherlands supported raising the European Union emission restrictions from 20% to 30%; however, the Netherlands has only committed to reaching the minimum 14% goal for itself.

== See also ==
- Wind power in the Netherlands
- Solar power in the Netherlands
- Hydroelectric power in the Netherlands
- Electricity sector in the Netherlands
- Energy in the Netherlands
