= List of offshore wind farms in the North Sea =

This is a list of operational, offshore wind farms in the North Sea.

This information is gathered from multiple Internet sources, and primarily the 4C Offshore's Global Offshore Wind Farm Map and Database and is current up to July 2015. The name of the Wind Farm is the name used by the Energy Company when referring to the Farm and is usually related to a shoal or the name of the nearest town on shore.

== Operational wind farms ==
Wind farm	Country	Location	Cap. (MW)	Turbines	Commissioned	Build cost	Depth range (m)	km to shore	Owner	Ref.
Albatros	Germany	54°30′N 6°24′E	117.6	16 × Siemens SWT-7.0-154	2020					
Alpha Ventus	Germany	54°00′40″N 6°36′28″E	60	6 × Multibrid M5000, 6 × REpower 5M	2010	€250 million	28	56	EWE 47.5% E.ON 26.25% Vattenfall 26.25%	(Note: Alpha Ventus)
Amrumbank West	Germany	54°31′22″N 7°42′17″E	302	80 × Siemens SWT-3.6-120	2015		20-25	40	Amrumbank West GmbH	
Borkum Riffgrund I	Germany	53°58′00″N 6°33′00″E	312	78 × Siemens SWT-4.0-120	2015	€1.25 billion	23-29	55	Ørsted, Kirkbi, Oticon	(Note: Borkum Riffgrund 1)
Borkum Riffgrund II	Germany	53°56′49″N 6°29′07″E	448	56 × MHI Vestas V164	2019					
BARD Offshore 1	Germany	54°21′30″N 5°58′30″E	400	80 × BARD 5.0	2013	€2,900 million	40	100	Ocean Breeze Energy	(Note: BARD Engineering)
Beatrice Demonstration Project)	United Kingdom	58°06′20″N 03°05′35″W	10	2 × REpower 5M	2007	£35 million	45	23	SSE and Talisman Energy	(Note: Beatrice)^{p11}
Belwind	Belgium	51°40′N 2°48′E	165	55 × Vestas V90-3.0MW; 55 × Alstom Haliade 150-6MW	2010	€614 million		46	Parkwind	
Blyth Offshore	United Kingdom	55°08′09″N 01°29′25″W	4	2 × Vestas V66-2MW	2000	£4 million	6-11	1.6	E.ON	
Borssele I–II	Netherlands	51°42′N 3°05′E	752	94 × Siemens SWT-8.0-154	2020					
Borssele III–IV	Netherlands	51°42′25″N 2°54′45″E	731.5	77 × MHI Vestas V164 9.5MW	2021					
Borssele V	Netherlands	51.7092°N 3.0033°E	19	2 × MHI Vestas V164 9.5MW	2021					
Butendiek	Germany	55°00′49″N 7°46′07″E	288	80 × Siemens SWT-3.6	2015			35	WPD Nordsee Offshore GmbH	
DanTysk	Germany	55°08′N 7°12′E	288	80 × Siemens SWP-3.6-120	2015	$900 million	21-31	70	Vattenfall; Stadtwerke München	(Note: DanTysk)
Deutsche Bucht	Germany	54°18′N 5°48′E	260.4	31 × MHI Vestas V164-8.0 MW	2019					
Dudgeon	United Kingdom	53°15′00″N 1°23′0″E	402	67 × Siemens SWT-6.0-154	2017	£1.5bn		32	Equinor; Statkraft	(Note: Dudgeon Offshore Wind Farm)
Egmond aan Zee	Netherlands	52°36′N 4°25′E	108	36 × Vestas V90-3MW	2008	€200 million	15-18	13	Nuon, Shell	(Note: OWEZ)
Luchterduinen	Netherlands	52°25′N 4°10′E	129	43 × Vestas V112/3000	2015	€450 million	18-24	24	Eneco, Mitsubishi	(Note: Eneco project Luchterduinen)
Gemini	Netherlands	54°02′10″N 5°57′47″E	600	150 × Siemens SWT-4.0	2017	€2.8 billion		55	Northland Power, Siemens, Van Oord, HVC NV	(Note: Gemini Wind Farm)
Global Tech I	Germany	54°30′00″N 6°21′30″E	400	80 × Multibrid M5000	2015	€1.8 billion	39-41	110	Wetfeet Offshore Windenergy	(Note: Project - Global Tech I)
Gode Wind 1 & 2	Germany	54°04′00″N 7°02′00″E	582	97 × Siemens SWT-6.0-154	2016	€2.2 billion	30	42	Ørsted	
Greater Gabbard	United Kingdom	51°56′0″N 1°53′0″E	504	140 × Siemens SWT-3.6-107	2012	£1,500 million	20-32	23	SSE Renewables	(Note: SSE wind farm Project Website)
Gunfleet Sands 1 & 2	United Kingdom	51°43′0″N 01°12′50″E	172	48 × Siemens SWP-3.6-107	2010	£300 million	2-15	7	Ørsted	(Note: Gunfleet Sands)
Hohe See	Germany	54°26′N 6°19′E	497	48 × Siemens SWT-7.0-154	2019					
Horns Rev I	Denmark	55°31′47″N 7°54′22″E	160	80 × Vestas V80-2MW	2002	€272 million	10-20	18	Vattenfall 60% Ørsted 40%	(Note: Horns Rev 1 Vattenfall Horns Rev 1)
Horns Rev II	Denmark	55°35′54″N 7°34′34″E	209	91 × Siemens SWP-2.3-93	2009	€470 million	9-17	32	Ørsted	(Note: Horns Rev II turbines)
Horns Rev III	Denmark	55°41′49″N 7°40′09″E	406.7	49 x MHIVestas V164-8.3MW	2019		10-20	30	Vattenfall	(Note: Horns Rev III)
Humber Gateway	United Kingdom	53°38′38″N 0°17′35″E	219	73 × Vestas V112-3.0	2015	€900 million	10-18	10	E.ON	(Note: umber Gateway)
Hywind	Norway	59°08′24″N 05°01′55″E	2.3	1 × Siemens SWP-2.3-82	2009	NOK 400 million	220	10	Equinor	
Hywind Scotland	United Kingdom	57°29′N 01°21′W	30	5 × Siemens SWP-6.0-154	2017	NOK2 billion (£152m)		29	Equinor (75%); Masdar (25%)	
Hywind Tampen	Norway	61°19′47.9″N 2°42′0″E	88	11 × Siemens SG 8.0-167 DD	2023	NOK 7.5 billion	260-300	140	Equinor	
Kaskasi	Germany	54°29′00″N 7°41′00″E	342	38 × Siemens Gamesa SG 8.0-167DD	2022					
Kentish Flats	United Kingdom	51°27′36″N 01°05′24″E	90	30 × Vestas V90-3.0MW	2005	£121.5 million	3-5	10	Vattenfall	(Note: Kentish Flats)^{p69}
Lincs	United Kingdom	53°11′0″N 0°29′0″E	270	75 × Siemens SWT-3.6-120	2013	£1,000 million	10-15	8	Centrica, Siemens, Ørsted	
London Array	United Kingdom	51°38′38″N 1°33′13″E	630	175 × Siemens SWT-3.6	2013	£1,800 million	0-25	20	Ørsted, E.ON UK Renewables, Masdar	(Note: London Array)
Lynn and Inner Dowsing	United Kingdom	53°07′39″N 0°26′10″E	194	54 × Siemens SWP-3.6-107	2009	£300 million	6-11	5	Centrica 50% TCW 50%	^{p119}
Meerwind Süd/Ost	Germany	54°23′N 7°41′E	288	80 × Siemens SWT-3.6-120	2014	€1,300 million	22-26	53	WindMW GmbH.	(Note: Meerwind Süd/Ost)
Merkur	Germany	54°02′N 6°33′E	396	66 × GE Haliade 150-6MW	2019					
Nobelwind	Belgium	51°31′41″N 3°01′55″E	165	50 × Vestas V112-3.3 MW	2017					
Nordergründe	Germany	53°50′06″N 8°10′05″E	110.7	18 × Senvion 6.2M126	2017					
Nordsee One	Germany	53°58′44″N 6°48′50″E	332.1	54 × Senvion 6.2M126	2017					
Nordsee Ost	Germany	54°26′N 7°41′E	295	48 × Senvion 6.2M126	2015		25	55	RWE Innogy	(Note: Nordsee Ost)
Norther	Belgium	51°31′41″N 3°01′55″E	369.6	44 × Vestas V164-8.4 MW	2019				Elicio	
Northwester 2	Belgium	51°41′15″N 2°44′56″E	219	23 × Vestas V164-9.5 MW	2020					
Northwind	Belgium	51°37′00″N 2°54′00″E	216	72 × Vestas V90-3.0	2014	€850 million	16-29	37	Parkwind	(Note: Northwind Energy)
Princess Amalia	Netherlands	52°35′22″N 4°12′23″E	120	60 × Vestas V80-2MW	2008	€350 million	19-24	26	Eneco Energie	
Rentel	Belgium	51°35′28″N 2°56′38″E	309	42 × 7.35 MW	2020					
Riffgat	Germany	53°41′N 6°29′E	113	30 × Siemens SWT-3.6-120	2014	€480 million	16-24	15-42	ENOVA, EWE	(Note: Riffgat)
Sandbank	Germany	55°11′N 6°51′E	288	72 × Siemens SWT-4.0-130	2017	€1.2 billion	24-34	90	Vattenfall	
Scroby Sands	United Kingdom	52°38′0″N 1°47′0″E	60	30 × Vestas V80-2MW	2004	£75.5m	0-8	2.5	E.ON	(Note: Scroby Sands)^{p53}
Mermaid	Belgium	51°43′12″N 2°44′09″E	235.2	28 × Siemens SWP-8.4 MW	2020					
Seastar	Belgium	51°38′00″N 2°51′36″E	168	20 × Siemens SWP-8.4 MW	2020					
Sheringham Shoal	United Kingdom	53°07′0″N 1°08′0″E	317	88 × Siemens SWT-3.6-107	2012	£1,100 million	12-24	17	Equinor 50% Statkraft 50%	(Note: SCIRA - Sheringham Shoal)
Teesside	United Kingdom	54°38′50″N 1°05′40″W	62	27 × Siemens SWT-2.3	2013	£200 million	7-15	1.5	EDF-EN	
Thanet	United Kingdom	51°26′0″N 1°38′0″E	300	100 × Vestas V90-3.0MW	2010	£780-900 million	20-25	11	Vattenfall	
Thorntonbank	Belgium	51°33′06″N 2°58′01″E	325.2	6 × REpower 5M, 48 × Senvion 6M	2013	€1,100 million	13-19	27	C-Power	(Note: C-Power offshore windfarm)
Trianel Windpark Borkum (phase 1)	Germany	54°2′30″N 6°28′0″E	200	40 × Areva M5000-116	2015	€900 million	28-33	45	Trianel	(Note: Trianel wind farm Borkum)
Veja Mate	Germany	54°N 6°E	402	67 × Siemens SWT-6.0-154	2017	€1.9 billion	41	95	Highland Group Holdings Ltd, Siemens Financial Services, Copenhagen Infrastructure Partners	
Westermost Rough	United Kingdom	53°48′18″N 0°08′56″E	210	35 × Siemens SWT-6.0	2015	€1,000 million	10-25	8	Ørsted	(Note: Westermost Rough)
"Cap." is the rated nameplate capacity of the wind farm; "Commissioned" is the year when the windfarm was or will be commissioned and put into service.; "Cost" is the total capital cost of the project up to commissioning.; "km to shore" is the average distance of the windfarm to shore, or (where available) the distance from the in-farm transformer/substation to the shore; "Depth range (m)" is the range of minimum to maximum depths of water that the windfarm is sited in; "Refs" cite the source references for the information. The [w ...] footnotes link to each windfarm's own home page

== Map ==
Locations of offshore wind farms in the North Sea

== See also ==
- Wind power in Europe
- List of wind farms
- List of offshore wind farms
- Lists of offshore wind farms by country
- Lists of offshore wind farms by water area
- List of offshore wind farms in the United Kingdom
- List of offshore wind farms in Denmark
- List of offshore wind farms in the Netherlands
- List of offshore wind farms in Germany
- Wind power in the United Kingdom
- Wind power in Denmark
- Wind power in the Netherlands
- Wind power in Belgium
- Wind power in France
- Wind power in Germany
