= List of offshore wind farms in Germany =

Offshore wind farms in the German Bight

The following is a list of offshore wind farms in Germany, operational within the national maritime boundaries. Germany, along with Denmark and the United Kingdom is a worldwide leader in advancing offshore wind farm technology. The name of the wind farm is the name used by the energy company when referring to the farm and is usually related to a shoal or the name of the nearest town on shore.

== Offshore wind farms ==
Name	Coordinates	Capacity (MW)	Turbines	Commissioned	Cost	Capacity factor	Depth range (m)	Distance to shore (km)	Owner	Ref.
Albatros	54°29′1″N 6°15′8″E	112	16 × Siemens SWT-7.0-154	2019	€400 million		40	110	EnBW, Enbridge	
Alpha Ventus	54°1′0″N 6°36′0″E	60	6 × Multibrid M5000, 6 × REpower 5M	2010	€250 million	50.8% (2011)	28	56	EWE 47.5% E.ON 26.25% Vattenfall 26.25%	(Note: Alpha Ventus)
Amrumbank West	54°26′00″N 7°41′0″E	302	80 × Siemens SWT-3.6-120	2015		44.9% (2019)		40	E.ON	
Arkona Wind Park	54°46′59″N 14°07′16″E	385	60 × Siemens-Gamesa SWT-6.0-154	2018	€1.4 billion	44.2% (2019)	23-37	35	Energy Infrastructure Partners AG, RWE, Equinor	
BARD Offshore 1	54°21′18″N 5°58′48″E	400	80 × BARD 5.0	2013	€2.9 billion	39.9% (2019)	40	100	Ocean Breeze Energy	(Note: BARD Engineering)
Borkum Riffgrund I	53°58′01″N 6°33′14″E	312	78 × Siemens SWT-4.0-120	2015	€1.25 billion	36.5% (2019)	23-29	55	Ørsted, Kirkbi, Oticon	(Note: Borkum Riffgrund 1)
Borkum Riffgrund 2	54°58′0″N 6°29′44″E	450	56 x V164-8.0 MW MHI Vestas	2019		29.9% (2019)	25	54	Ørsted	
Breitling	54°9′40″N 12°7′52″E	2.5	1x Nordex N90 2.5MW	2006			0.5	0.3	Wind-Projekt GMBH	
Butendiek	55°01′08″N 7°46′26″E	288	80 × Siemens SWT-3.6	2015				35		
DanTysk	55°8′24″N 7°12′0″E	288	80 × Siemens SWP-3.6-120	2015	$900 million	51.5% (2019)	21-31	70	Vattenfall; Stadtwerke München	(Note: DanTysk)
Ems Emden	53°19′57″N 7°12′36″E	4.5	1x Enercon E-112	2004			3	0.6		(Note: Ems Emden)
Baltic 1	54°36′50″N 12°40′0″E	48.3	21x Siemens SWT 2.3-93	2011	€300 million	48.2% (2012)	16-19	16	EnBW	(Note: Baltic 1)
EnBW Baltic 2	55°00′00″N 13°12′00″E	288	80 × Siemens SWT 3.6-120	2015	€1.25 billion		23-44	32	EnBW	(Note: EnBW Baltic 2)
Global Tech I	54°15′43″N 6°24′38″E	400	80 × Multibrid M5000	2015				110		
Gode Wind 1 & 2	54°03′00″N 07°01′00″E	582	97 × Siemens SWT-6.0-154	2016	€2.2 billion	44.0% (2019)	30	42	Ørsted	
Hohe See	54°26′0″N 6°28′0″E	497	71 × Siemens SWT-7.0-154	2019	€1.8 billion		40	95	EnBW, Enbridge	
Hooksiel	53°38′13″N 8°6′14″E	5	1x Bard 5.0	2008			5	0.4		(Note: Hooksiel)
Meerwind Süd/Ost	54°23′0″N 7°41′0″E	288	80 × Siemens SWT-3.6-120	2014	€1.3b		22-26	53	WindMW GmbH.	(Note: Meerwind Süd/Ost)
Merkur	54°2′0″N 6°33′0″E	396	66 x GE Haliade 150-6MW	2019	€1.6 billion		30	60	TRIG /APG	
Nordsee One	53°58′44″N 6°48′50″E	332	54 × Senvion 6.2M126	2017					Northland Power, Innogy	
Nordsee Ost	54°26′00″N 7°41′0″E	295	48 × Senvion 6.2M126	2015				55	Innogy	(Note: Nordsee Ost)
Riffgat	53°41′24″N 6°28′48″E	113	30 × Siemens SWT-3.6-120	2014	€480 million		16-24	15-42	ENOVA, EWE	(Note: Riffgat)
Sandbank	55°11′30″N 06°51′30″E	288	72 × Siemens SWT-4.0-130	2017	€1.2 billion	53.2% (2019)	24-34	90	Vattenfall; Stadtwerke München	
Trianel Windpark Borkum (phase 1)	54°2′30″N 6°28′0″E	200	40 × Areva M5000-116	2015	€900 million		28-33	45	Trianel	
Veja Mate	54°19′00″N 5°52′0″E	402	67 × Siemens SWT-6.0-154	2017	€1.9 billion	45.4% (projected)	41	95	Highland Group Holdings Ltd, Siemens Financial Services, Copenhagen Infrastructure Partners	
Wikinger	54°50′2″N 14°4′5″E	350	70 × Adwen AD 5-135	2018	€1.4 billion				Iberdrola	
Trianel Windpark Borkum (phase 2)		200	32 x Senvion 6.2M152	2020			25-35	45	Trianel	
Kaskasi	Helgoland	342	38 x Siemens SG8.0-167DD	2022					Innogy	

=== Map of offshore wind farms ===
Offshore wind farm locations (interactive map)

=== Wind farms under construction ===
Wind farm	Coordinates	Capacity (MW)	Turbines	Commissioning	Cost	capacity factor	Depth range (m)	km to shore	Owner	Ref.
Baltic Eagle		476	Vestas V174-9.5	2024			40-45		Iberdrola	
Borkum Riffgrund 3		900	Siemens SG11.0-200DD	2025					Ørsted/Nuveen	
He Dreiht		960	Vestas V236-15.0	2025				85	EnBW	

=== Projects ===
Wind farm	Coordinates	Capacity (MW)	Turbines	Planned commissioning	Cost	Capacity factor	Depth range (m)	km to shore	Owner	Ref.
Gode Wind 3		242	Siemens SG11.0-200DD	2024				40	Ørsted	

== Gallery ==
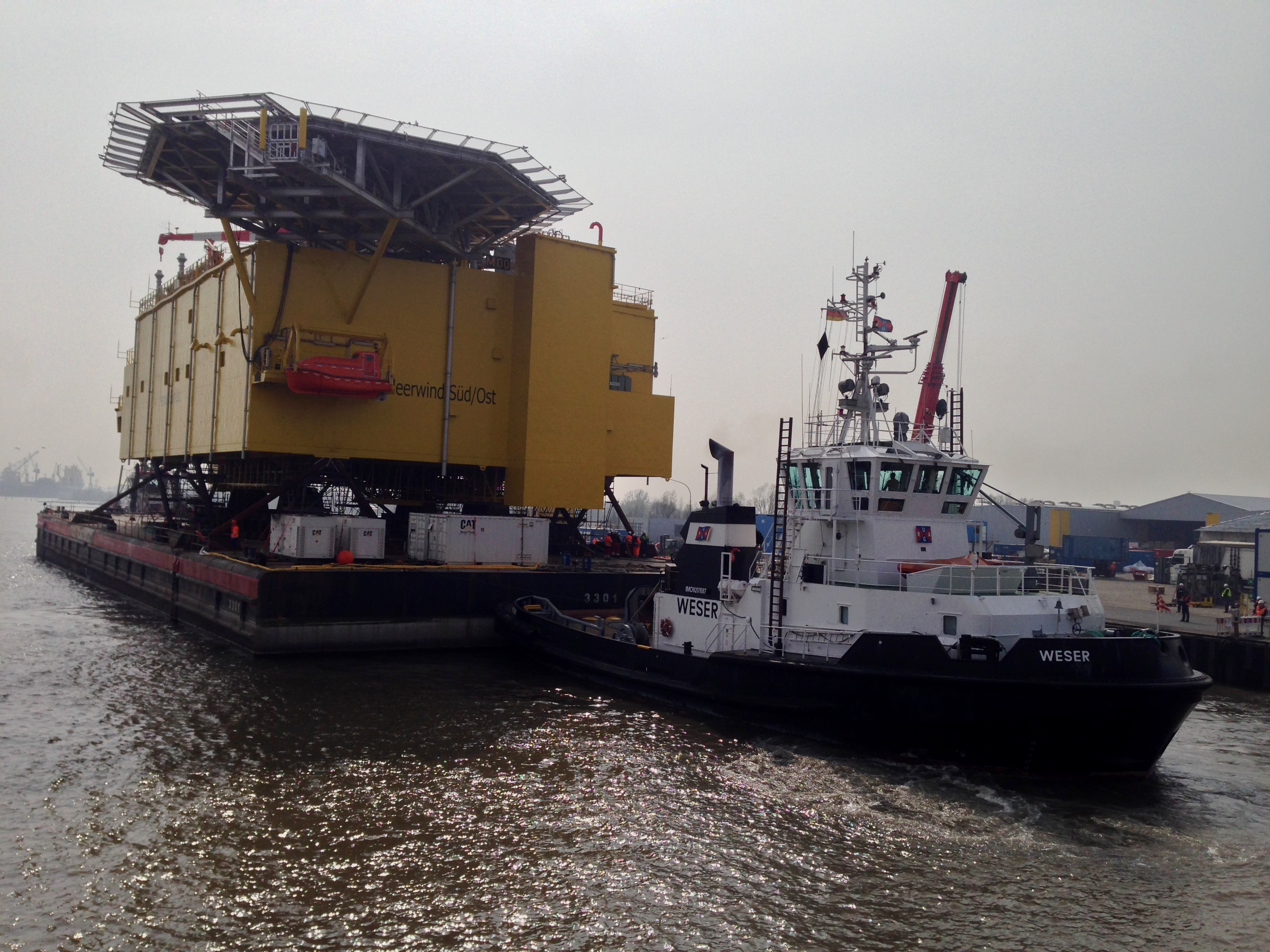
Offshore transformer platform "Meerwind Süd/Ost" being transported

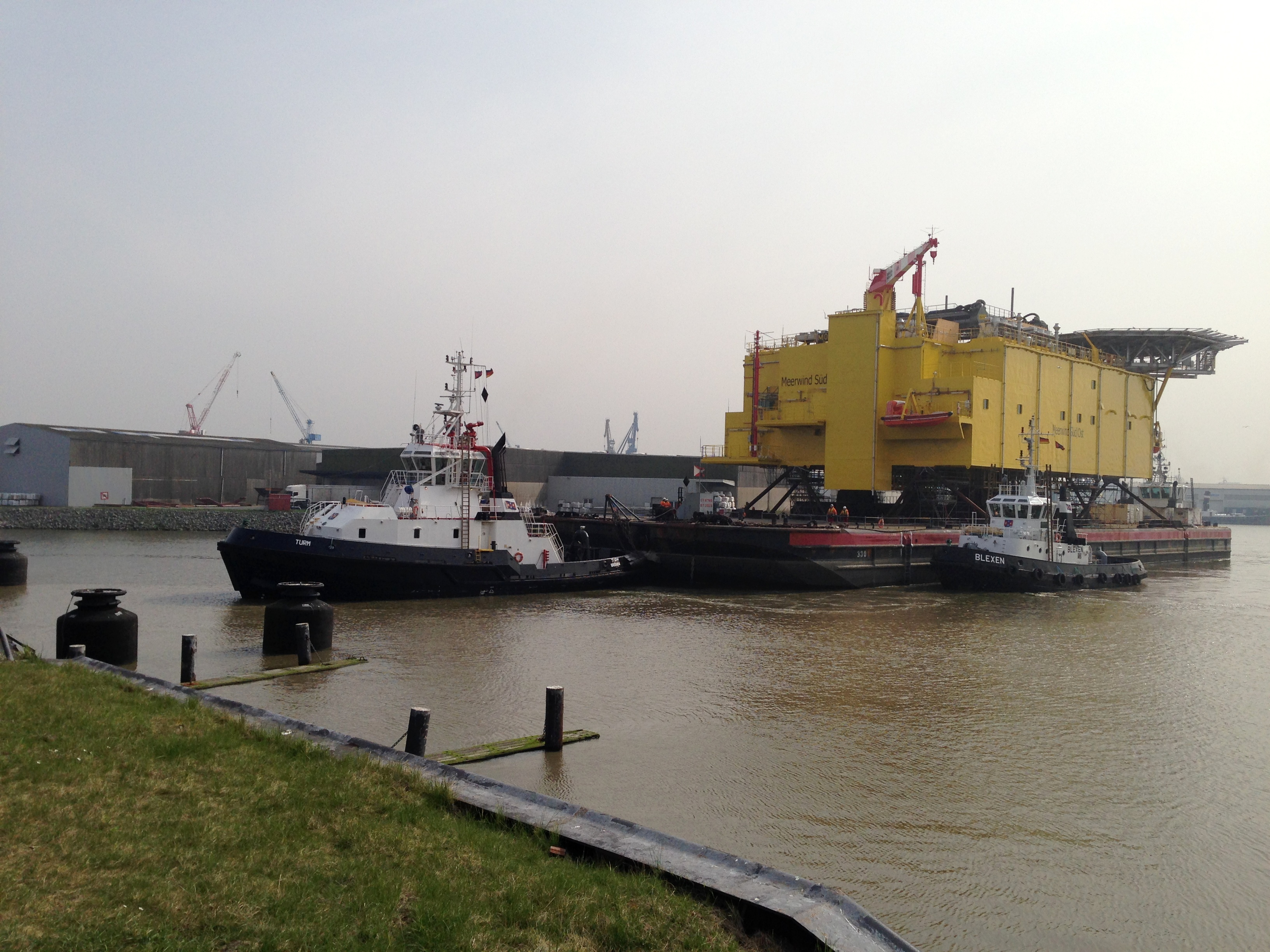
"OSS Meerwind" on the passage to the lock

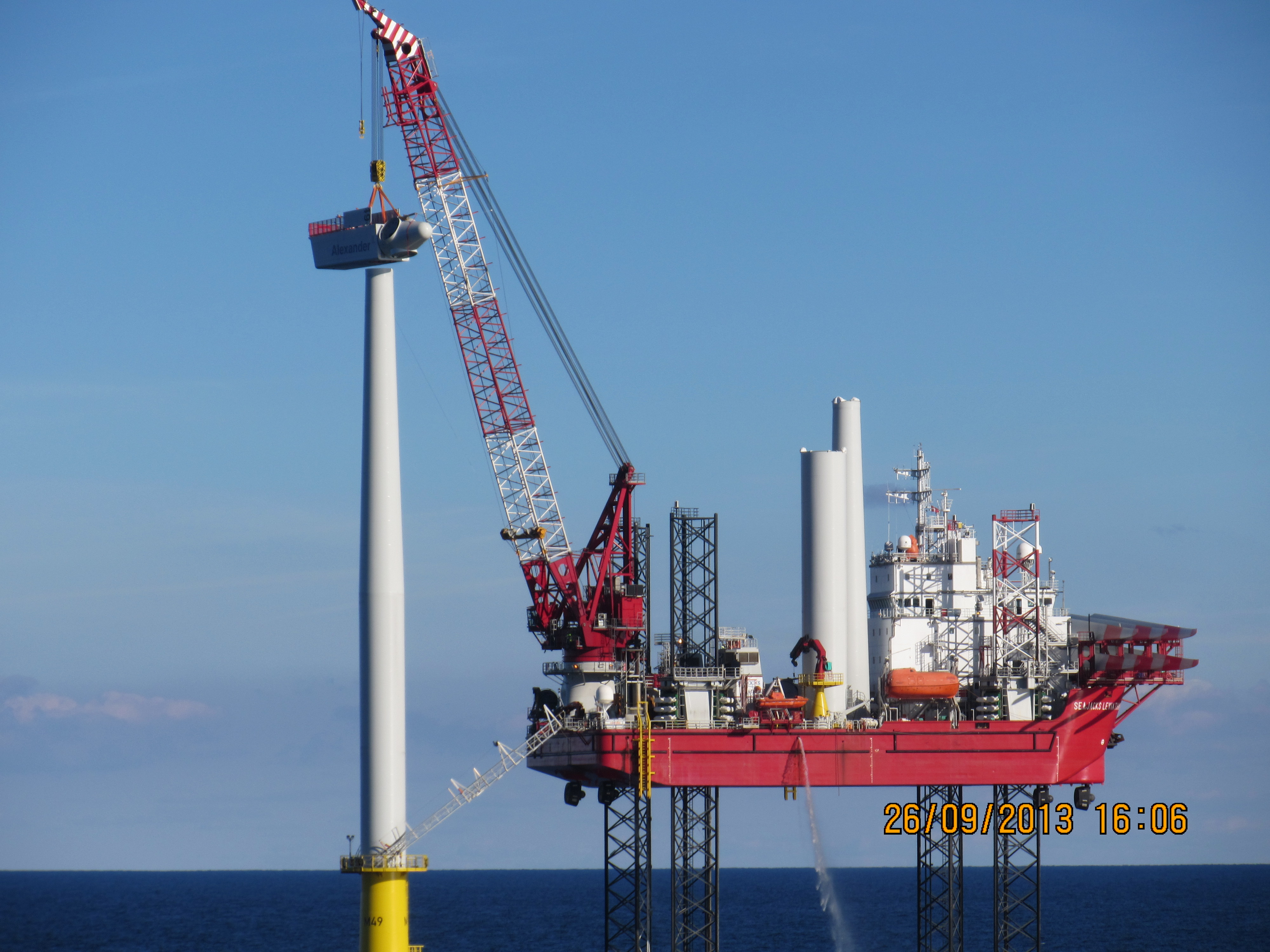
Construction of a wind turbine at "Meerwind Süd/Ost"

== See also ==
- Wind power in Germany
- List of offshore wind farms
- Lists of offshore wind farms by country
- List of offshore wind farms in the North Sea
- List of onshore wind farms
