= Kaskasi Offshore Wind Farm =

Offshore wind farm in Germany

Kaskasi
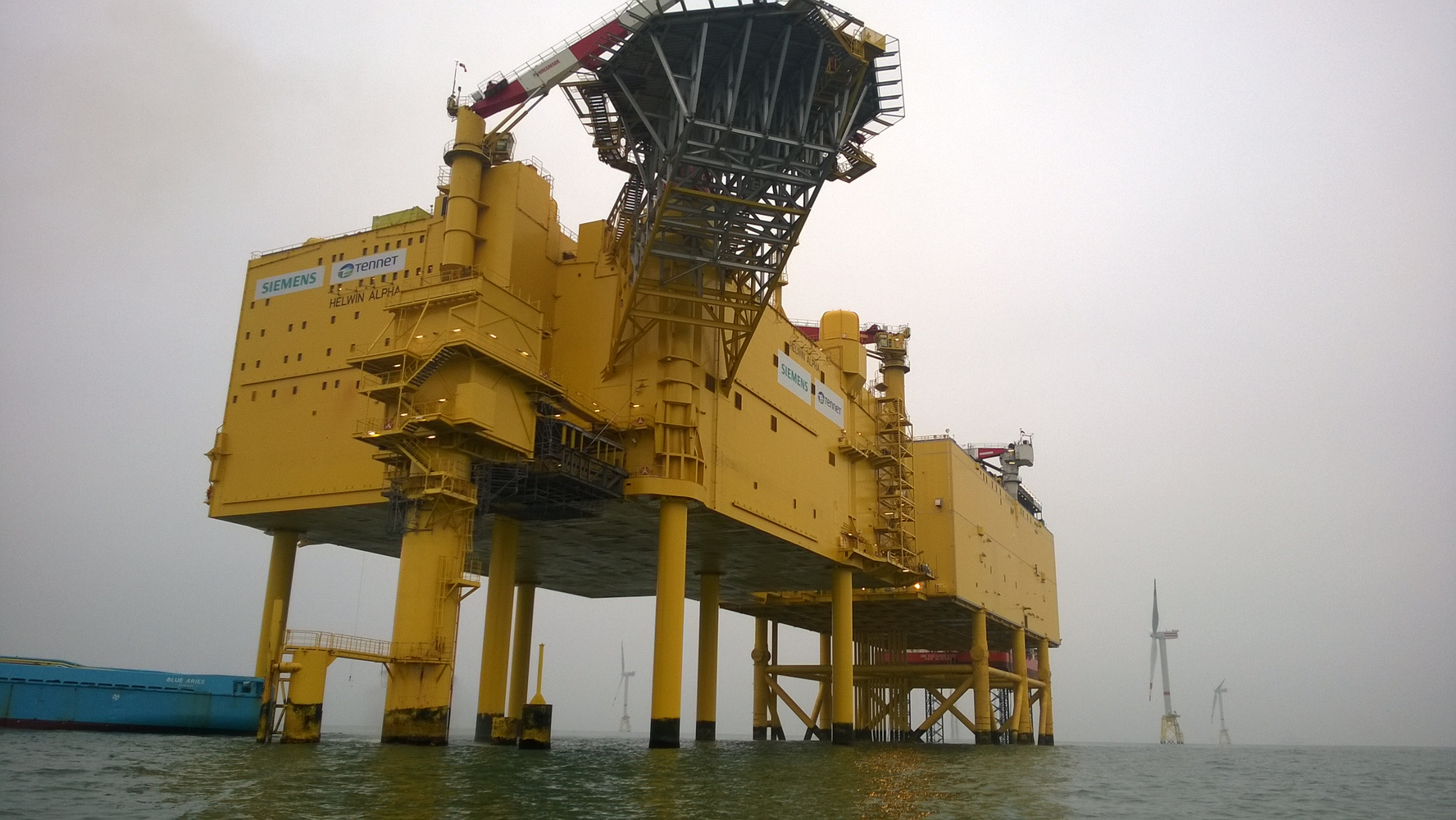
- Country: Germany
- Coordinates: 54°29′00″N 7°41′00″E
- Status: Operational
- Commission date: 23 March 2023
- Owner: RWE AG

Wind farm
- Type: Offshore
- Hub height: 107.5 m (353 ft)
- Rotor diameter: 167 m (548 ft)

Power generation
- Units operational: 38 × 9 MW
- Make and model: Siemens Gamesa SG 8.0-167 DD (38)
- Nameplate capacity: 342 MW

Wind farm layout

Kaskasi's location in the wind farms of the German Bight

Kaskasi is an offshore wind farm in the German part of the North Sea. It is located 35 km north of the island of Helgoland. The wind farm lies south of the Amrumbank West wind farm and to the north of the Nordsee Ost wind farm. The wind farm is owned by RWE

The wind farm consists of 38 Siemens Gamesa wind turbines with a capacity of 9 MW each. Construction of the wind turbines was completed at the end of 2022 and the wind farm was officially opened on 23 March 2023.

== See also ==
- Wind power in Germany
- List of offshore wind farms in Germany
