= Nobelwind Offshore Wind Farm =

Belgian offshore wind farm in the North Sea

Nobelwind
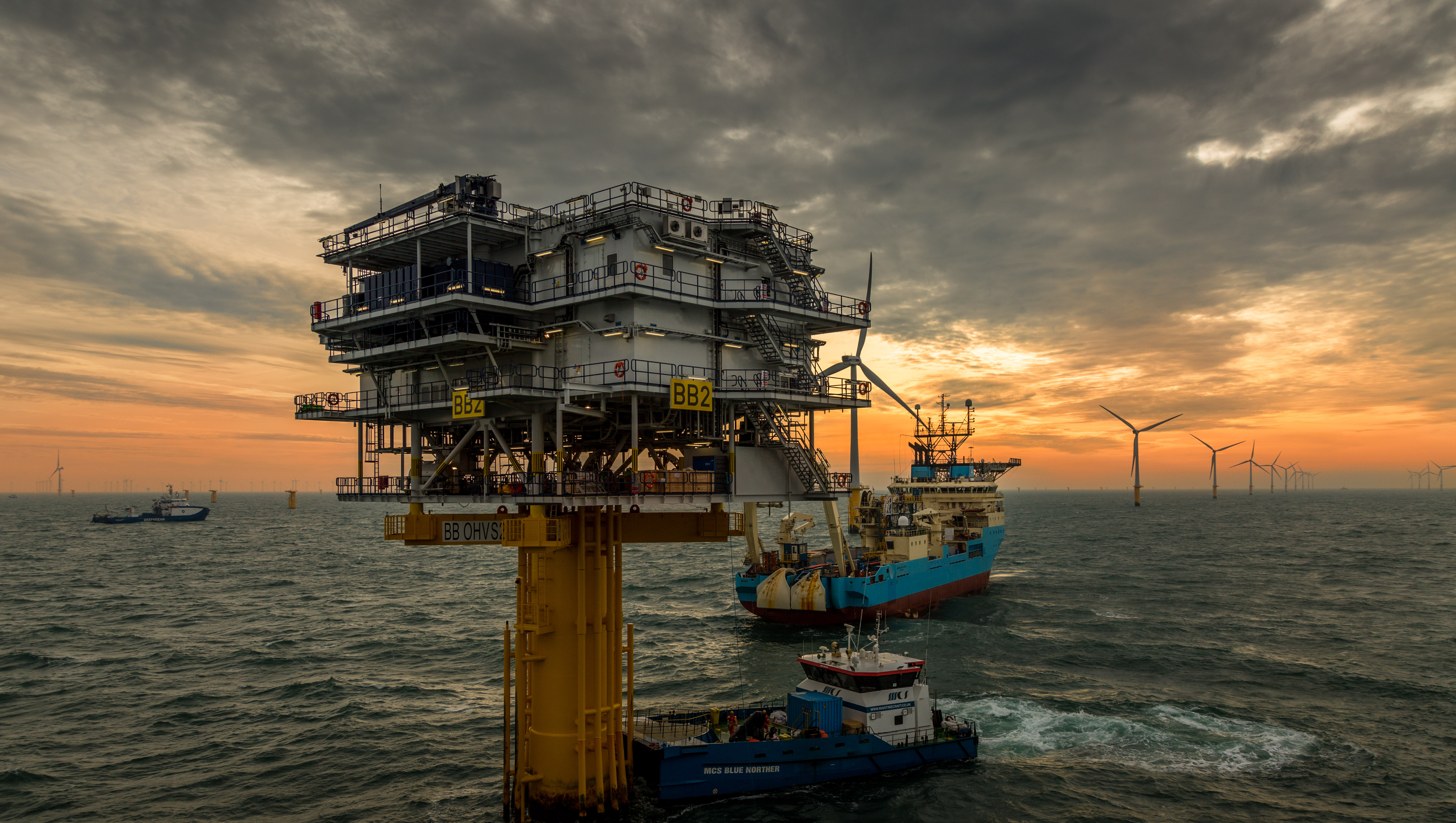
- Country: Belgium
- Coordinates: 51°39′47″N 2°50′02″E
- Status: Operational
- Commission date: 2017

Wind farm
- Type: Offshore
- Max. water depth: 38 m (125 ft)
- Distance from shore: 47 km (29 mi)
- Rotor diameter: 112 m (367 ft)
- Site area: 19.8 km^{2} (7.6 sq mi)

Power generation
- Units operational: 50 × 3.3 MW
- Make and model: Vestas V112-3.3 MW (50)
- Nameplate capacity: 165 MW

External links
- Commons: Related media on Commons

Wind farm layout

Nobelwind (also known as Belwind 2 or Bligh Bank Phase II) is an offshore wind farm located on the Bligh Bank in the Belgian part of the North Sea. The wind farm lies directly to the south of the Northwester 2 wind farm and to the north of the Seastar wind farm. The farm was commissioned in 2017 and is the fourth offshore wind project in Belgium. It is built as an extension to the Belwind wind farm.

The wind farm consists of 50 Vestas V112 wind turbines with a capacity of 3.3 MW each, giving the farm a total capacity of 165 MW. The farms submarine electrical export cable is connected to the nearby Northwind offshore wind farm, from where it has a shared connection to the main land.

== See also ==
- Wind power in Belgium
