= Amrum Bank =

Undersea bank in the North Sea

Amrum Bank Amrumbank
- Location within North Sea
- Location: North Sea
- Coordinates: 54°39′23″N 7°25′56″E
- Basin countries: Germany

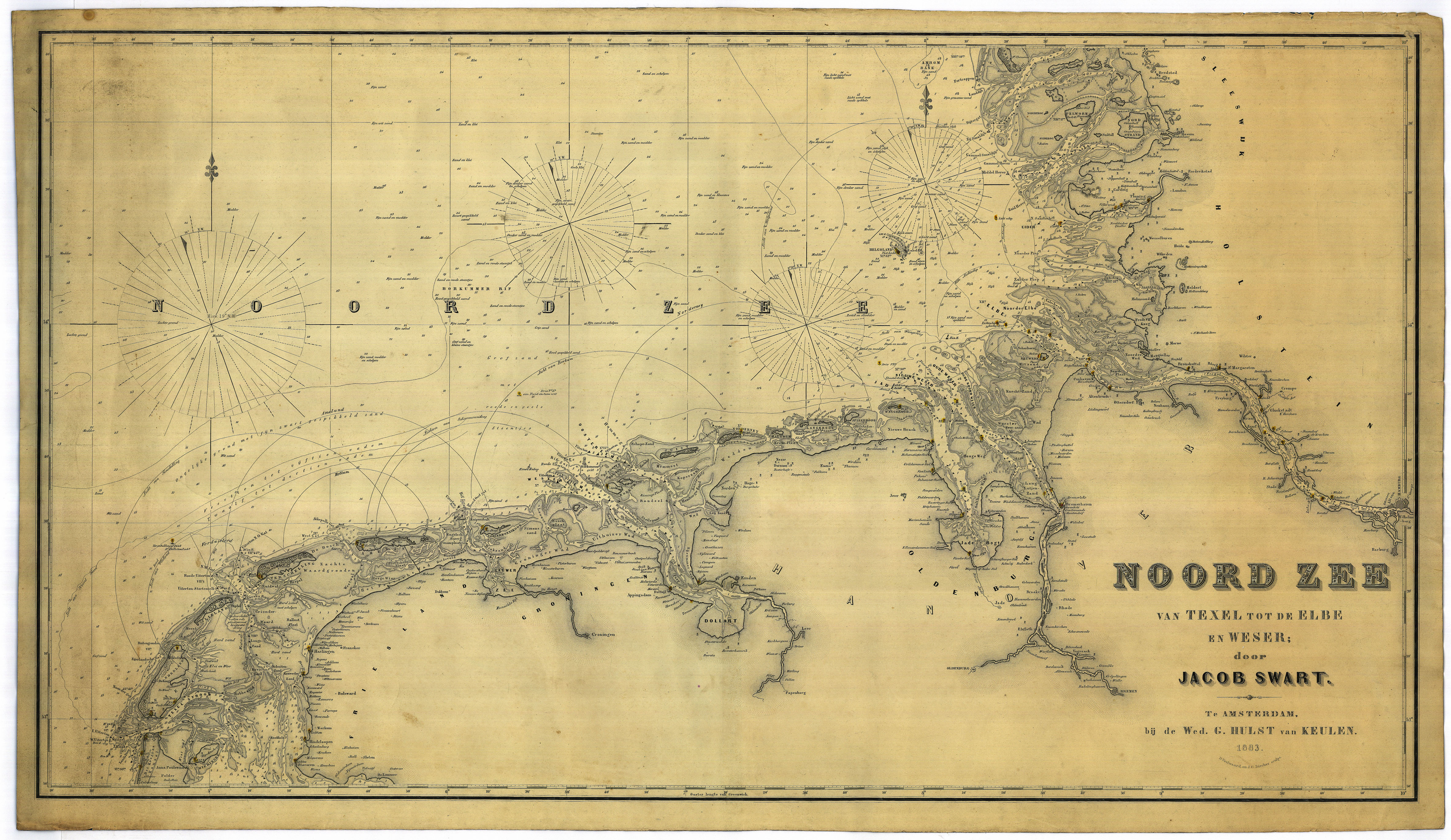
Amrom Bank on a map from 1883 (top of image)

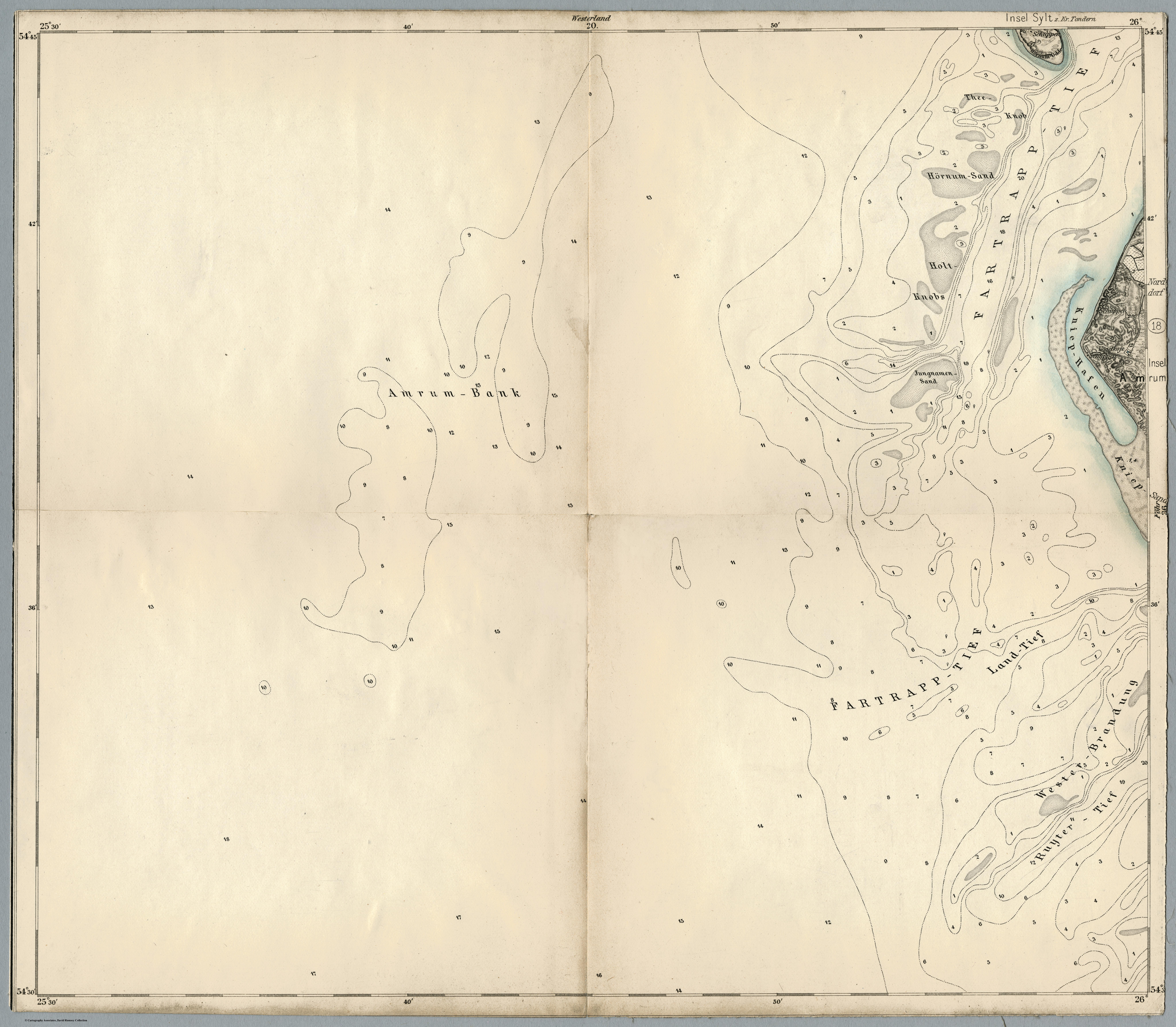
Amrum Bank on the map of Amrum (1893)

Amrum Bank (German: Amrumbank, Danish: Amrum Banke, North Frisian: Oomrambeenk) is an undersea bank in the North Sea. It is approximately 54 kilometres (34 mi) from Amrum island and 60 kilometres (37 mi) from Heligoland.

== General ==
The Amrum Bank has a water depth of less than 10 meters (33 ft) and extends for a total length of 12 neutical miles in a south-southwesterly direction. It is divided into two parts by an 11 meter (36 ft) deep passage. The shallowest water depth in the middle of the southwestern part is 6.7 meters (21 ft). The surrounding seabed slopes very gradually from the Amrum Bank.

From 1908 to 1939, a lightship was stationed on the southwest side of the Amrum Bank at position 54°34'N 7°53' E. The Amrumbank I, a steamship with reserve sails, was replaced by the Amrumbank II at the beginning of World War II. In 1919, the lightship was requisitioned. Today, shallow waters are marked by cardinal marks.

In addition to the two lightships, a navigational aid vessel commissioned in 2011 also bears the name of the bank.

About ten nautical miles further southwest, the Amrum Bank West offshore wind farm is being built in deeper water.
