= Solar power in Belgium =

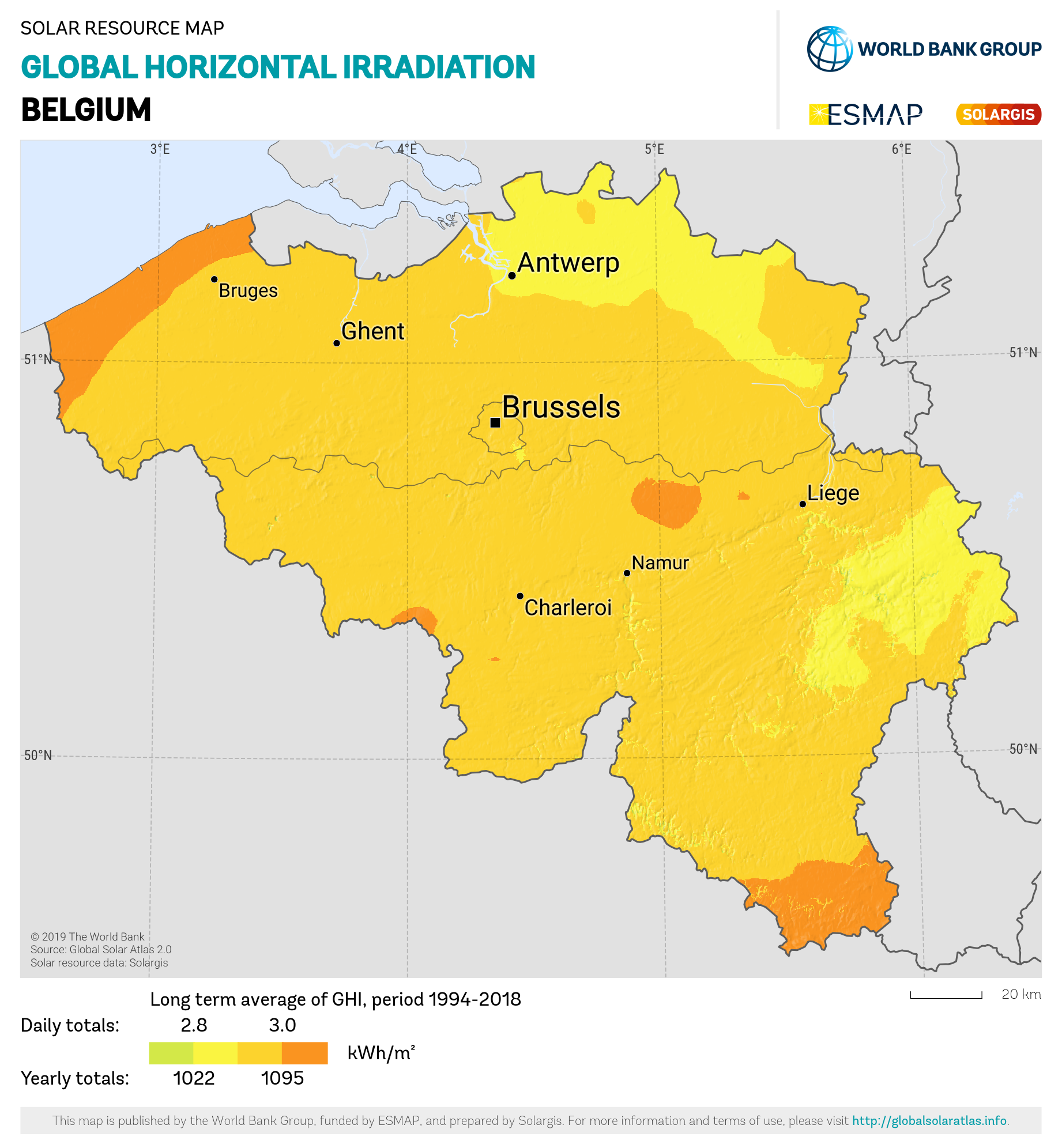
- Solar irradiation map of Belgium
- Installed capacity: 10 GW (2024) (25)
- Annual generation: 9 TWh (2024)
- Capacity per capita: 814 W (2024)
- Share of electricity: 12% (2024)

Solar power in Belgium reached an installed capacity of 9.9 GW at the end of 2023, an increase of 1.8 GW from 2022.

Belgium had 4,254 MW of solar power generating 3,563 GWh of electricity in 2018. In 2015 PV solar power accounted for around 4% of Belgium's total electricity demand, the 4th highest penetration figure in the world, although the country is some way behind the leaders Germany, Italy and Greece at between 7% and 8% of electricity demand. Installed capacity grew at an outstanding pace from 2008 until 2012, but growth then slowed to a steady pace before the large increases in 2022. Almost all of solar power in Belgium is grid connected.

== Timeline ==
Belgian growth of PV capacity
in megawatts since 2005
Source: EPIA and IEA-PVPS

Year	Photovoltaics		
Year	MWp	GWh	Ref
2008	71	n.a	
2009	574	488	
2010	787	560	
2011	2,051	1,170	
2012	2,768	2,115	
2013	2,983	2,352	
2014	3,140	2,883	
2015	3,252	3,045	
2016	3,561	3,086	
2017	3,846	3,149	
2018	4,254	3,563	
2019		3,528	
2020		4,259	
2021		4,678	
2022		6,413	
2023	9,900	7,193	
Source: Photovoltaic Barometer

2007

Installed capacity of solar power increased drastically after 2007. During 2009 the amount of solar installations quadrupled from 16,000 to 65,000. Residential and small installations had a combined power of about 220 MWp.

2009

In December 2009, there were 35,500 solar power installations in the Flemish region, 17,000 in Wallonia and 7,000 in the Brussels Capital Region. The number of installations in the Flemish region in particular was expanding rapidly at that time due to a favourable support measure expiring at the end of the year.

2011

At the end of 2011 the bulk of photovoltaic capacity was installed in the Flemish Region (88%), the remaining 12% was found mostly in Wallonia. The smaller Brussels-Capital Region had an installed capacity of 7 MWp.

2013

In 2013, Belgium's watt per capita distribution, the total installed photovoltaic capacity per inhabitant, amounted to 267 watts. This was the third highest per-capita figure in the European Union—and therefore also in the world at that time—just behind Germany (447 watts) and Italy (295 watts). In terms of the overall installed capacity of 2,983 MW, Belgium ranked tenth and belonged to the Top 10 leading photovoltaic countries in the world.

2014

In the afternoon of 20 March 2014, a new record of peak electricity generation was achieved. According to the power supplier Eneco Energie, more than two gigawatts of electric power, corresponding to two full-sized nuclear power plants, were generated by solar PV and supplied more than 20 percent of the overall electricity consumption at the time.

2015

In 2015, solar PV per capita amounted to 287 watts, the third highest in the world after Germany and Italy, providing around 4% of Belgium's total electricity demand.

2016

Solar PV per capita grew to 302.8 watts, remaining the third highest in the EU.

2020

Between 2010 and 2020, renewable electricity production nearly tripled, rising from 5.4 terawatt-hours (TWh) to 23.4 TWh. Solar PV generation experienced significant growth as well, increasing its share of total electricity generation from 0.6% to 5.8% over the same timeframe.

2022

In March 2022, a EUR 1.2 billion initiative was launched to increase renewable electricity production. This initiative funds solar photovoltaic (PV) installations at national railway stations, equipped with electric vehicle (EV) smart charging, and on federal buildings. It also supports the development of large-scale floating solar PV projects. To further encourage the use of solar PV, the initiative includes a reduction in the Value Added Tax (VAT) on solar PV panels to 6% for the years 2022 and 2023. Additionally, it streamlines the process for obtaining permits and licenses for onshore solar PV projects.

OVAM, the public waste agency of the Flemish-speaking macro-region of Flanders, has created an online map of the region's 2,500 landfills. They cover a total surface area of more than 100 square kilometers. The agency said most of the sites are currently inactive. Only 2% of the region's waste is being brought to such locations.

== Notable installations ==
Pairi Daiza Brugelette Solar PV Plant is a 20MW solar PV power project in Hainaut, Belgium. Construction commenced in 2019 and it entered into commercial operation in 2020.

Kristal Solar PV Park is a 99.5MW solar PV power project located in Limburg, Belgium. The project construction commenced in 2018 and subsequently entered into commercial operation in June 2019.

Zelzate – LTi REEnergy Solar PV Park is a 15MW solar PV power project located in East Flanders, Belgium. The project was commissioned in November 2013.

In 2011, a 3-kilometre (2-mile) above ground "tunnel", built to avoid having to fell trees for a new high-speed railroad, was covered with solar panels.

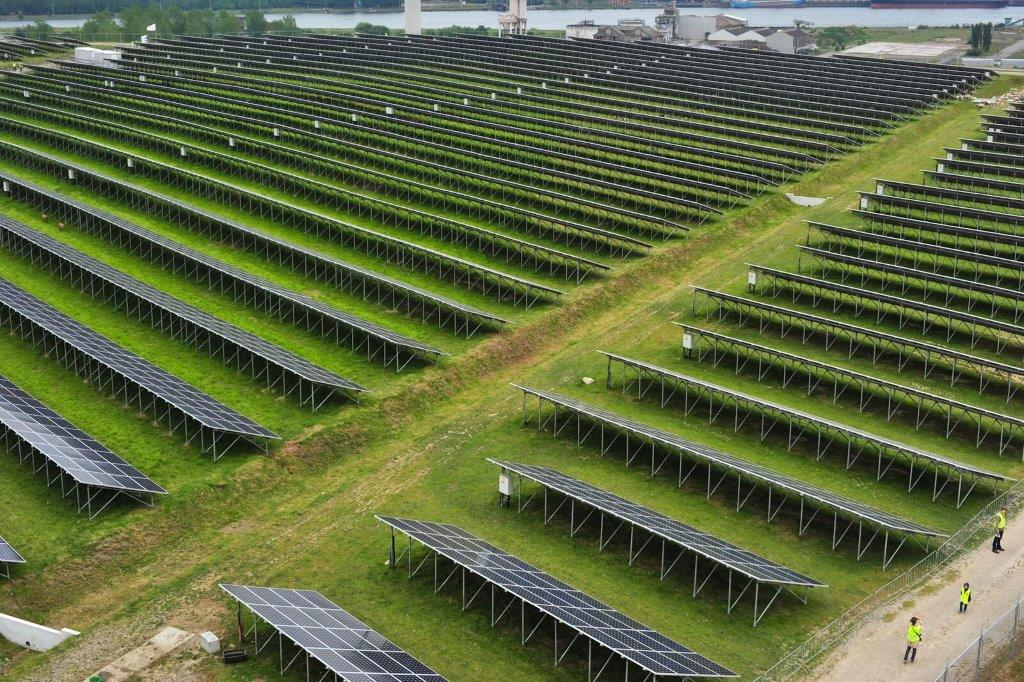
Photovoltaic power station in Belgium

Trunsun Solar Park is a 10MW solar PV power project. It was commissioned in 2010 and is located in Limburg, Belgium.

Invictus-Antwerpen Solar PV Park is a 40MW solar PV power project commissioned in December 2009. It is located in Antwerp, Belgium.

In October 2009, the city of Antwerp announced that they planned to install 2,500 m^{2} of solar panels on roofs of public buildings, that would generate 265MWh per annum.

In 2009, the city of Leuven installed 1,810 solar panels on public buildings.

== Solar PV market by segment ==
Installed capacity in Belgium by class size 2017
<10 kW	62.89%
10–100 kW	17.71%
>250 kW	19.39%

In 2017, nearly 63% of solar power installed in Belgium consisted of small systems under 10 kW, mostly residential rooftop solar PV. Larger systems over 250 kW accounted for almost 20% of the total.

=== Residential solar PV capacity ===
According to a report on behalf of the European Commission in 2015, Flanders had an estimated 1,301 MW (666 MW) of residential solar PV capacity with 336,000 (232,000) residential solar PV prosumers in the country representing 7.1% (3.7%) of households. The average size of residential solar PV systems is estimated to be 3.87 kW moving to 2030. The technical potential for residential solar PV in Flanders is estimated at 7,327 MW and Wallonia at 3,753 MW. The payback time for residential Solar PV in Flanders was 14.7 years whilst in Wallonia it was 6.9 years as of 2015. Some of the advantages of small scale residential Solar include eliminating the need for extra land, keeping cost saving advantages in local communities and empowering households to become prosumers of renewable electricity and thus raising awareness of wasteful consumption habits and environmental issues through direct experience.

== Flanders ==
As of July 2012, there were already 42,644 photovoltaic installations in the Flemish region that had received green certificates.

Installed capacity (MWp) by the end of the year
Year	Antwerp	Limburg	East Flanders	Flemish Brabant	West Flanders	Total
2006	1.1	0.9	0.8	1.1	0.7	4.5
2007	3.8	3.7	3.6	3.3	4.2	18.5
2008	18.5	12.1	17.3	11.4	16.4	75.6
2009	91.4	47.0	102.4	54.8	89.3	384.9
2010	156.5	94.5	186.0	97.6	167.1	701.7
2011	357.6	329.8	340.1	185.9	362.8	1576.1
2012	464.9	421.3	429.9	234.4	449.1	1999.7
2013	477.7	427.4	465.8	243.1	464.8	2078.9
2014	490.3	436.7	477.1	249.5	472.9	2126.5
2015	513.9	455.4	491.0	258.0	485.8	2204.2
2016	543.4	479.6	524.5	276.7	512.2	2336.5
2017	589.9	512.0	576.4	304.9	556.7	2539.9
2018	643.2	545.8	639.6	343.2	610.8	2782.6
2019	718.3	657.1	734.5	390.8	692.7	3193.3
2020	884.4	801.8	914.4	502.0	877.5	3980.2
2021	985.0	849.9	1004.0	562.9	958.7	4360.4
2022	1144.3	956.7	1164.4	663.6	1093.9	5023.0
2023	1407.2	1104.9	1425.1	817.8	1316.4	6171.3

=== Subsidies ===
By 2011, it became clear that Flemish subsidies for solar panels had had a significant impact on the cost of electricity of households without a photovoltaic installation. An added cost of up to 148 EUR was charged annually. Flemish minister for Energy Freya van den Bossche admitted that subsidies were too high, especially for large-scale installations. The guaranteed minimum price for electricity produced was reduced. For small photovoltaic installations(less than 1 MW), it was reduced from 330 EUR per MWh to 250 EUR per MWh by January 2012 with the goal of reaching renewable energy targets at a reasonable cost. This resulted in a rally which caused the number of installations to almost double from 20,514 to 37,355 in 2011. The minimum price was lowered further to 93 EUR per MWh from 2013 onwards.

== Wallonia ==
Installed capacity (MWp)
Year	Total capacity
2008	14
2009	63
2010	112
2011	266
2012	556
2013	745
2014	806
2015	843
2016	902
2017	986
2018	1095
2019	1233
2020	1340
2021	1502
2022	1655

== Brussels ==
Installed capacity
Year	Total capacity (MWp)	Quantity (number of installations)	Number of inhabitants	Wp/person (or per capita solar)	kWp/km^{2}	Number of households	Wp/households
2006	0.04	5	1018804	0.04	0.27	497576	0.09
2007	0.09	29	1031215	0.08	0.53	501824	0.17
2008	0.76	303	1047346	0.72	4.66	509597	1.49
2009	4.54	1585	1068532	4.25	27.95	513754	8.84
2010	6.10	1893	1089538	5.60	37.54	520791	11.71
2011	8.72	2176	1119088	7.79	53.69	531862	16.39
2012	20.60	2603	1138854	18.09	126.86	538304	38.28
2013	46.77	3031	1154635	40.50	287.93	541648	86.34
2014	49.01	3169	1163486	42.13	301.76	540440	90.69
2015	52.82	3321	1175173	44.95	325.22	542670	97.34
2016	58.02	3582	1187890	48.85	357.25	545394	106.39
2017	67.27	3861	1191604	56.45	414.18	545145	123.40
2018	91.36	4536	1198726	76.21	562.48	547679	166.81
2019	130.84	6976	1208542	108.26	805.57	551243	237.35
2020	200.18	10993	1218255	164.32	1232.48	555967	360.06
2021	213.74	12728	1219970	175.20	1315.96	559260	382.18
2022	257.78	17379	1222637	210.84	1587.15	563882	457.16
2023	283.84	20331	1241175	228.69	1747.58	574603	493.98

== See also ==
- Energy in Belgium
- Wind power in Belgium
- Solar power
- Renewable energy by country
