= Vestas V164 =

Three-bladed offshore wind turbine

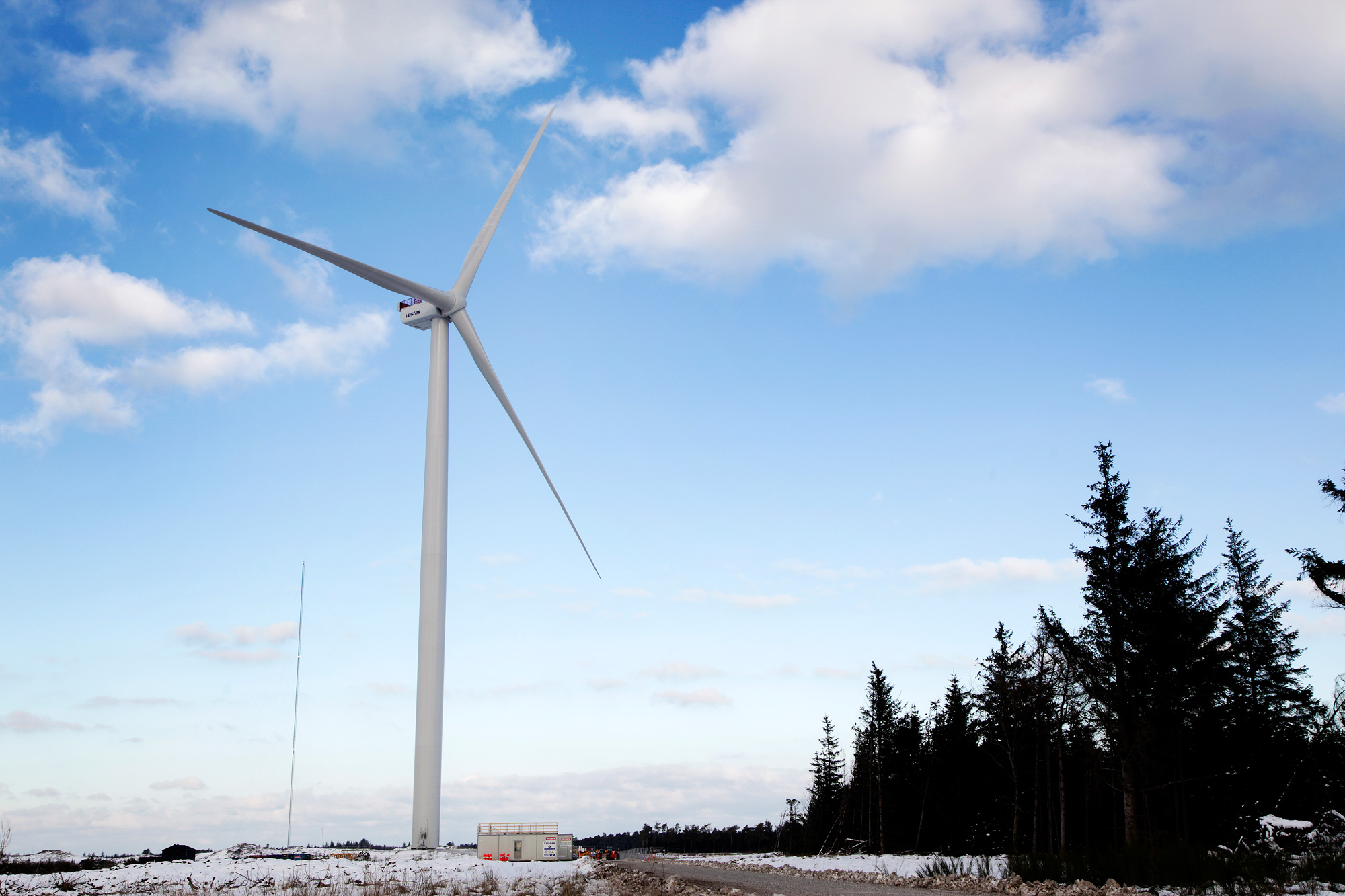
Prototype V164 turbine mounted onshore.

The Vestas V164 is a three-bladed offshore wind turbine, produced by Vestas, with a nameplate capacity of up to 10 megawatts, a world record. Vestas revealed the V164's design in 2011 with the first prototype unit operated at Østerild in northern Denmark in January 2014. The first industrial units were installed in 2016 at Burbo Bank, off the west coast of the United Kingdom. By 2021, Vestas had produced 500 of the series.

== Specifications ==
Since 2014 this offshore turbine has had the largest power generation capacity, with diameter of rotor 164 metres (538 ft) and swept area 21,124 square metres (227,380 sq ft). Each blade weighs 33—35 tonnes. Lead developer was Torben Hvid Larsen.

Originally called the Vestas V164-7.0MW, at 7.0 MW, the output was increased to 8.0 MW, later to 9.0 MW. In 2017 the turbine capacity was upgraded to 9.5 MW. The next largest wind turbines and competitors to the V164 are the Siemens Wind Power SWT-8.0-154 and Adwen AD 8-180 offshore turbines with a rated capacity of 8 MW, and the prototypes of the French 12—14 MW GE Haliade and the 16 MW MingYang. The Enercon E-126 turbine is rated up to 7.58 MW, but only installed onshore.

Starting November 2013, a prototype was installed at Østerild test station. The bottom tower sections weighs over 200 tonnes and is 24 meters long and 7 meters in diameter. The nacelle weighs 390 tonnes. The turbine weighs 1,300 tonnes and the foundation weighs 4,000 tonnes. The total height is 220 m (720 ft). It became operational in January 2014. Later that year favourable winds allowed it to sustain its rated 8 MW power for 24 hours for a record one-day production of 192 MWh. In 2017 the 9 MW version did the same for a new one-day production record of 216 MWh.

At the September 2018 Global Wind Summit, MHI Vestas announced the V164-10.0 MW. The increase in performance was achieved through "a small design change to enhance airflow and increase cooling in the converter". The first 10 MW was installed at Seagreen in Scotland in December 2021.

A later version nicknamed BlueMarlin, the 15 MW V236 with side-mounted converters, is scheduled for 2024.

== Notable sites ==
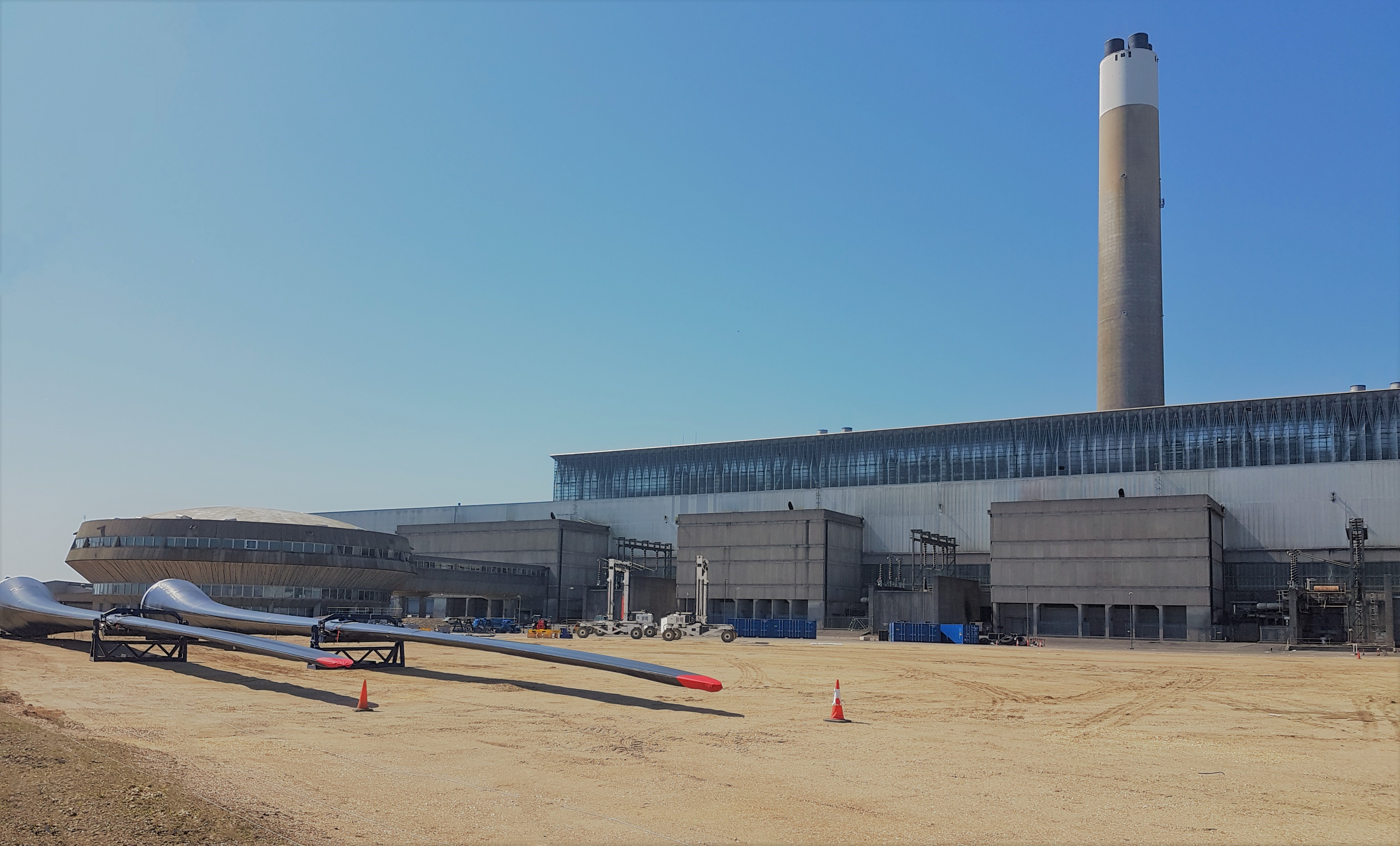
Vestas V164 blades at the disused Fawley Power Station site awaiting painting and finishing.

=== Netherlands: Borssele III & IV ===
The Blauwwind consortium is using 77 turbines for an estimated installed capacity of 731.5 MW at a site 55 km from the Port of Vlissingen. First power from the turbines was delivered on 7 August 2020.

=== United Kingdom: Burbo Bank Offshore Wind Farm ===
The model was shifted from prototype to production in 2014, when DONG Energy ordered 32 turbines (256 MW) for the extension of the 90 MW Burbo Bank Offshore Wind Farm. The nacelles were produced at the former Odense Steel Shipyard, while the blades are made at Vestas' Isle of Wight facilities. Assembly took place in Belfast. Installation began in 2016 and the wind farm was commissioned in April 2017.

=== United Kingdom: Walney Extension 3 Windfarm ===
40 x V164 MK1B turbines were commissioned on the west coast of Cumbria.

=== United Kingdom: Kincardine Floating Offshore Wind Farm ===
5x V164 Wind Turbines are deployed on floating foundations at Kincardine Offshore Wind Farm, near Aberdeen, Scotland. Kincardine was the world's most powerful floating wind farm, from commencement of operation in October 2021 until Hywind Tampen overtook it.

=== Belgium: Norther N.V. Wind Farm ===
In December 2016, Norther N.V. (Eneco/ Elicio) announced that MHI Vestas Offshore Wind will provide 44 x V164-8.4 MW (totalling approximately 370 MW) wind turbines to Belgium’s largest offshore wind project, located in the Belgian North Sea, approximately 23 km off the coast of Zeebrugge.

=== Belgium: Northwester 2 Wind Farm ===
In April 2018, Parkwind and MHI Vestas announced that MHI Vestas Offshore Wind will provide 23 x V164-9.5 MW wind turbines. Both companies attribute the fast installation timetable, set for late 2019, to the industrialisation of offshore wind in Belgium.

=== Denmark: Esbjerg, Måde ===
In April 2016, two turbines were inaugurated in Måde, each providing 8 MW power for a total of 16 MW. These turbines are series 0, i.e. a pre-mass-production model that may allow for further improvements in the design.

=== Denmark: Horns Rev 3 ===
In 2014, Danish Energy Agency announced that MHI Vestas Offshore Wind will provide 49 x V164-8.3 MW (totalling 406.7 MW) wind turbines to the farm Horns Rev 3, located in the Danish North Sea, approximately 40 km from Esbjerg.

== See also ==
- Østerild Wind Turbine Test Field
