= Northwind Offshore Wind Farm =

Belgian offshore wind farm in the North Sea

Northwind
- Country: Belgium
- Coordinates: 51°37′00″N 2°54′00″E
- Status: Operational
- Commission date: 2014

Wind farm
- Type: Offshore
- Max. water depth: 29 m (95 ft)
- Distance from shore: 37 km (23 mi)
- Rotor diameter: 112 m (367 ft)
- Site area: 14.5 km^{2} (5.6 sq mi)

Power generation
- Units operational: 72 × 3 MW
- Make and model: Vestas V112-3.0MW (72)
- Nameplate capacity: 216 MW

External links
- Website: parkwind.eu/projects/northwind

Wind farm layout

Northwind is an offshore wind farm located on the Lodewijkbank in the Belgian part of the North Sea. The wind farm was commissioned in 2014 and is the third offshore wind project in the Belgian North Sea after the Thorntonbank and Belwind wind farms.

The wind farm consists of 72 Vestas V112 wind turbines with a capacity of 3 MW each, giving the farm a total capacity of 216 MW.

== See also ==
- Wind power in Belgium
