= Meerwind Offshore Wind Farm =

Offshore wind farm in Germany

Meerwind Süd | Ost
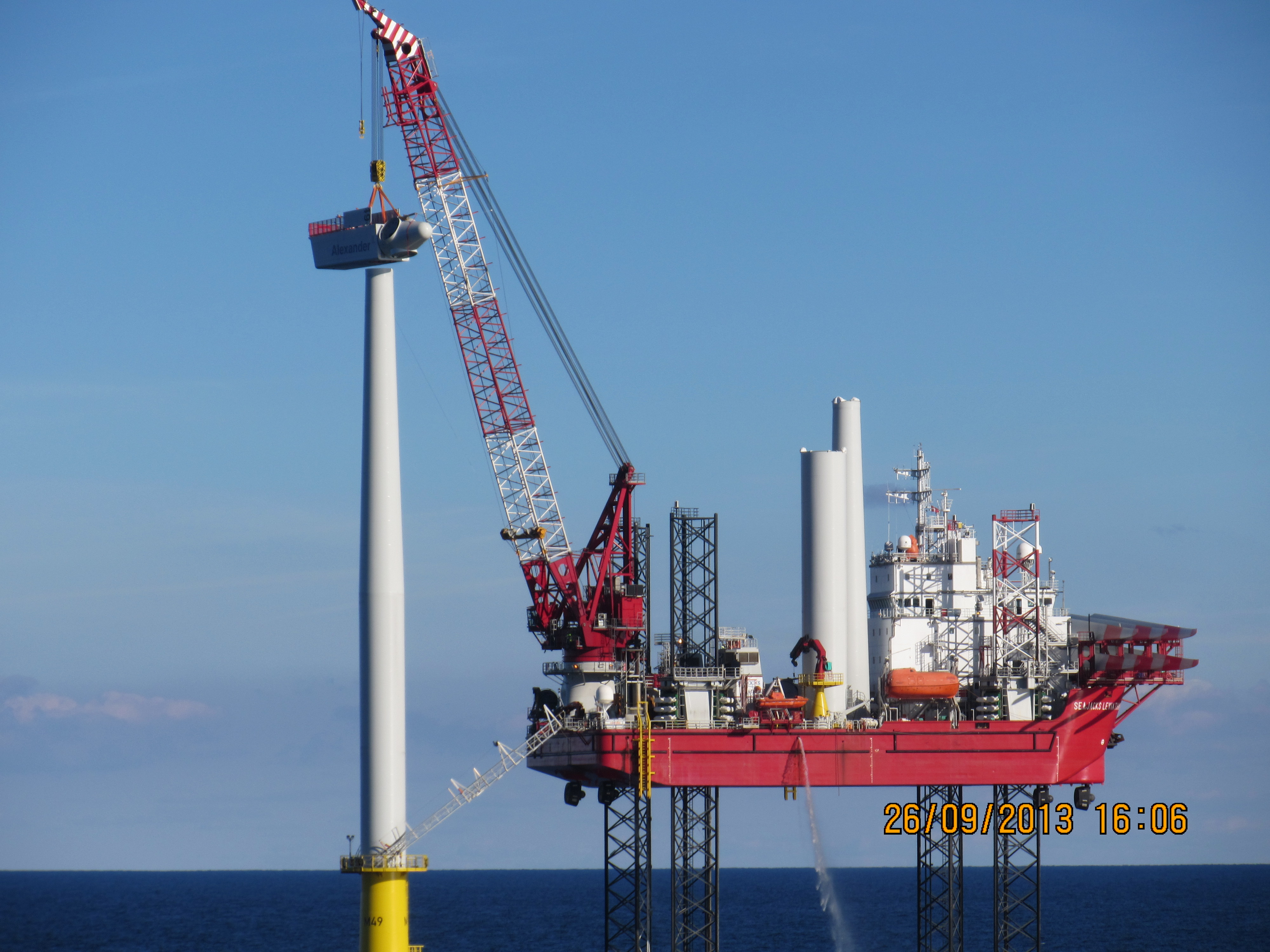
- Country: Germany
- Coordinates: 54°23′N 7°41′E
- Status: Operational
- Commission date: 2014

Wind farm
- Type: Offshore
- Rotor diameter: 120 m (390 ft)

Power generation
- Units operational: 80 × 3.6 MW
- Make and model: Siemens Gamesa SWT-3.6-120 (80)
- Nameplate capacity: 288 MW

External links
- Website: www.windmw.de
- Commons: Related media on Commons

Wind farm layout

Meerwind's location in the wind farms of the German Bight

Meerwind Süd | Ost is an offshore wind farm in the German part of the North Sea. It is located 23 km north of Helgoland. The wind farm lies south of the Nordsee Ost wind farm.

The wind farm consists of 80 Siemens wind turbines with a capacity of 3.6 MW each, giving the farm a total capacity of 288 MW. Construction of the wind farm started in September 2012. The wind farm was completed at the end of 2014.

== See also ==
- Wind power in Germany
- List of offshore wind farms in Germany
