= Norther Offshore Wind Farm =

Belgian offshore wind farm in the North Sea

Norther
- Country: Belgium
- Coordinates: 51°31′41″N 3°01′55″E
- Status: Operational
- Commission date: June 2019
- Owners: Nethys; Eneco

Wind farm
- Type: Offshore
- Max. water depth: 35 m (115 ft)
- Distance from shore: 23 km (14 mi)
- Hub height: 98 m (322 ft)
- Rotor diameter: 164 m (538 ft)
- Site area: 44 km^{2} (17 sq mi)

Power generation
- Units operational: 44 × 8.4 MW
- Make and model: Vestas V164-8.4MW (44)
- Nameplate capacity: 369.6 MW
- Capacity factor: 43.1% (projected)
- Annual net output: 1,394 GW·h

External links
- Website: www.norther.be
- Commons: Related media on Commons

Norther is an offshore wind farm in the Belgian North Sea, within the Exclusive Economic Zone of Belgium, approximately 23 kilometres from the Belgian port of Ostend. The concession was granted at the end of 2009, which is when the actual development of the project began.

Wind farm layout

The wind farm has a total of 44 Vestas V164-8.4 MW turbines on monopile foundations for a nameplate capacity of 369.6 MW with a projected annual production of 1,394 GWh, corresponding to a capacity factor of 43.1% and the average consumption of almost 400,000 households. The wind farm spans an area of 38 km^{2} with water depths up to 33 m. A seaweed farm is planned between the turbines.

The Norther offshore wind farm was developed through a joint venture between Elicio NV, a Belgian renewable energy producer operating internationally; and the Dutch utility company Eneco, who is a major producer and supplier of renewable electricity, natural gas and heat in the Netherlands and Belgium; and Diamond Generating Europe Ltd, is a fully owned subsidiary of Mitsubishi Corporation and cover power and water generation projects, as well as power downstream business in Europe, Middle East and Africa.

Offshore wind is expected to be a key element of Belgium's future energy mix and is projected to represent around 10% of total generated electricity by 2025. Norther Wind is operational since 2019.

== See also ==
- Wind power in Belgium
- Energy in Belgium
- List of offshore wind farms
