= Rentel Offshore Wind Farm =

Belgian offshore wind farm in the North Sea

Rentel
- Country: Belgium
- Coordinates: 51°35′28″N 2°56′38″E
- Status: Operational
- Commission date: January 2019

Wind farm
- Type: Offshore
- Max. water depth: 36 m (118 ft)
- Distance from shore: 34 km (21 mi)
- Site area: 22.72 km^{2} (8.77 sq mi)

Power generation
- Units operational: 42 × 7.35 MW
- Make and model: Siemens Gamesa SWT-7.0-154 (42)
- Nameplate capacity: 309 MW

Wind farm layout

Rentel is an offshore wind farm located in the Belgian part of the North Sea. The wind farm consists of 42 Siemens wind turbines with a capacity of 7.35 MW each, giving the farm a total capacity of 309 MW. The wind farm was fully operational in late 2018. It is the fifth offshore wind project in the Belgian North Sea. It has a cable to shore, but is also connected to the Modular Offshore Grid. After its shorecable was damaged in January 2024, it continued sending limited power via the MOG cable.

== See also ==
- Wind power in Belgium
