= Northwester 2 Offshore Wind Farm =

Belgian offshore wind farm in the North Sea

Northwester 2
- Country: Belgium
- Coordinates: 51°41′15″N 2°44′56″E
- Status: Operational
- Commission date: 2020

Wind farm
- Type: Offshore
- Max. water depth: 40 m (130 ft)
- Distance from shore: 51 km (32 mi)
- Site area: 12 km^{2} (4.6 sq mi)

Power generation
- Units operational: 23 × 9.5 MW
- Make and model: MHI Vestas V164-9.5MW (23)
- Nameplate capacity: 219 MW

External links
- Website: parkwind.eu/projects/northwester-2

Wind farm layout

Northwester 2 is an offshore wind farm located in the Belgian part of the North Sea. The wind farm was commissioned in 2020 and is the seventh offshore wind farm in Belgium. The farm is located between the Mermaid wind farm in the north and Nobelwind wind farm in the south.

The wind farm consists of 23 Vestas V164 wind turbines with a capacity of 9.5 MW each, giving the farm a total capacity of 219 MW.

== See also ==
- Wind power in Belgium
