= Thorntonbank Wind Farm =

Belgian offshore wind farm in the North Sea

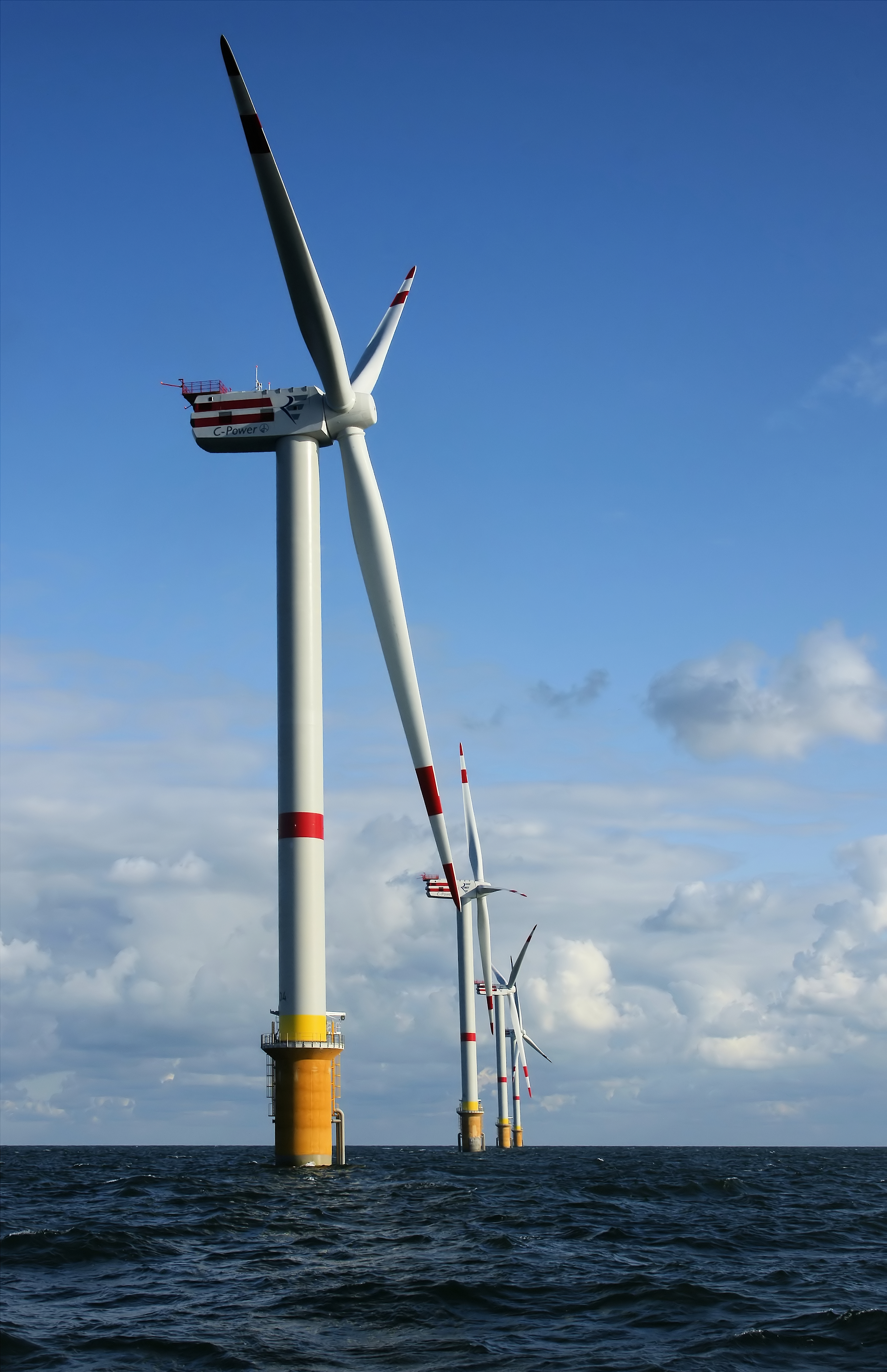
- Wind turbines D4 (nearest) to D1 on the Thornton Bank
- Country: Belgium
- Location: 28 km north off the Belgian coast
- Coordinates: 51°33′06″N 2°58′01″E
- Status: Operational
- Construction began: February 2008
- Commission date: 18 September 2013
- Construction cost: € 1.3 billion

Wind farm
- Type: Offshore
- Max. water depth: 28 m (92 ft)
- Distance from shore: 27 km (17 mi)
- Rotor diameter: 126 m (413 ft)
- Site area: 19.84 km^{2} (7.66 sq mi)

Power generation
- Units operational: 6 × 5 MW; 48 × 6.15 MW
- Make and model: Senvion 6.2M126 (48); Senvion REpower 5M (6)
- Nameplate capacity: 325 MW

External links
- Website: c-power.be
- Commons: Related media on Commons

The Thorntonbank Wind Farm (also known as C-Power) is an offshore wind farm. It is the first offshore wind farm in Belgium.

Electricity production started in early 2009, with a capacity of 30 MW. The capacity was increased to a total of 214 MW in 2012 and 325 MW in 2013.

== Phases ==
Wind farm layout

=== First phase ===
The first phase was built by C-Power, at a cost of €153 million. It was commissioned in June 2009.

The first phase of what will ultimately be a 325 MW wind farm was completed in September 2008. The six REpower 5 MW turbines, which were installed on concrete gravity foundations, were linked to the Belgian power grid, giving a total rated capacity of 30 MW for the first stage. The full story of the design, engineering, construction and installation of the Thorntonbank Wind Farm (first phase) is told in an illustrated book that was published in November 2010.

=== Second and third phase ===
In these phases, a total of 48 additional wind turbines of 6.15MWp were installed.

Phase 2, completed in October 2012, comprises the installation of 30 of the 48 wind turbines. These wind turbines have been installed on steel jacket foundations designed by OWEC Tower AS and assembled at the Smulders shipyard in Hoboken, Antwerp.

In the third and last phase, completed in September 2013, the remaining 18 wind turbines were installed, bringing the total capacity to around 325 MW.

== Environmental assessment ==
Research was by the Research Institute for Nature and Forest (INBO) and the Institute for Agricultural and Fisheries Research (ILVO)

== Financing ==
Thorntonbank was only the second offshore wind farm to be project financed.

== Gallery ==
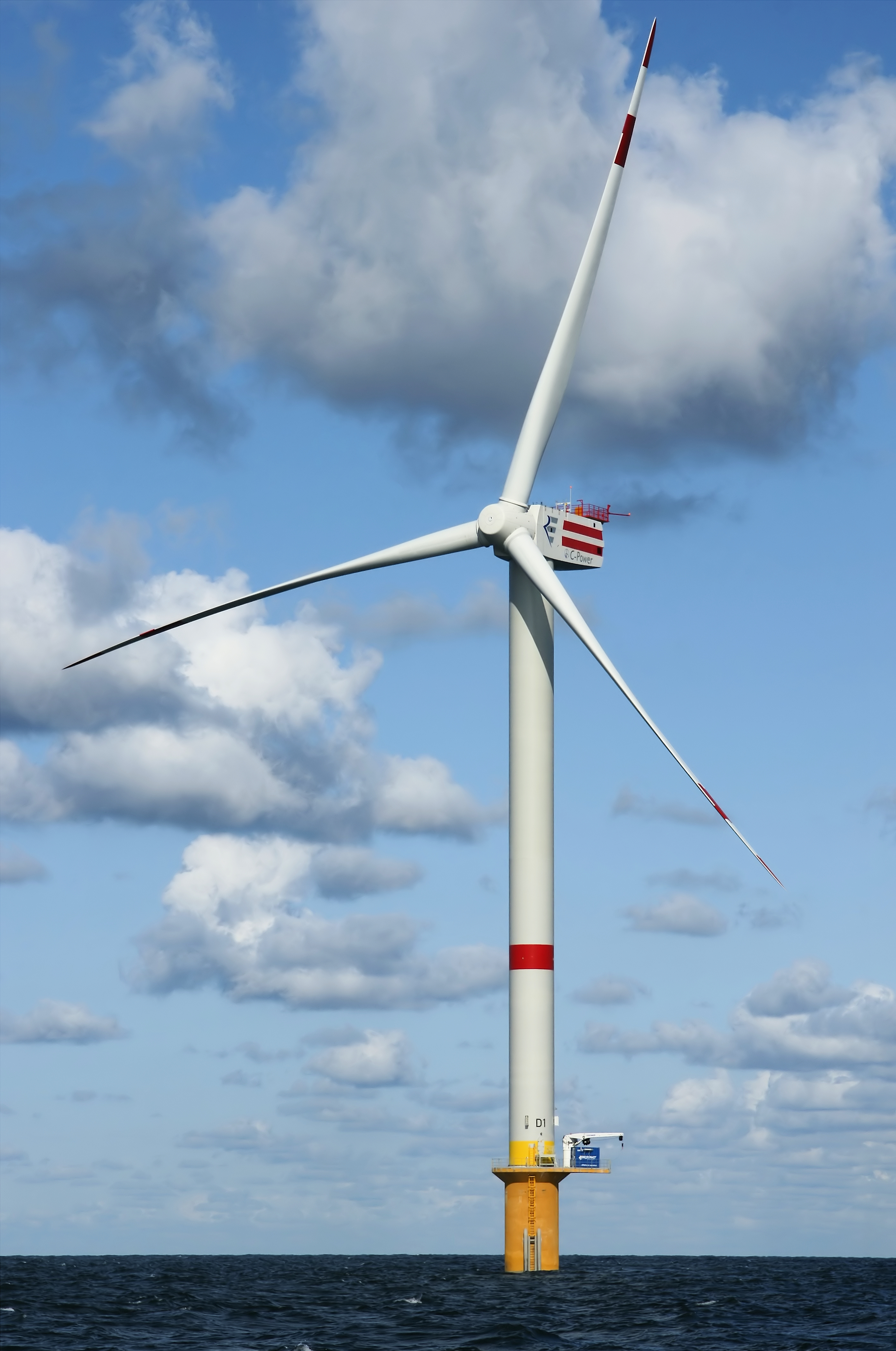
Wind turbine D1

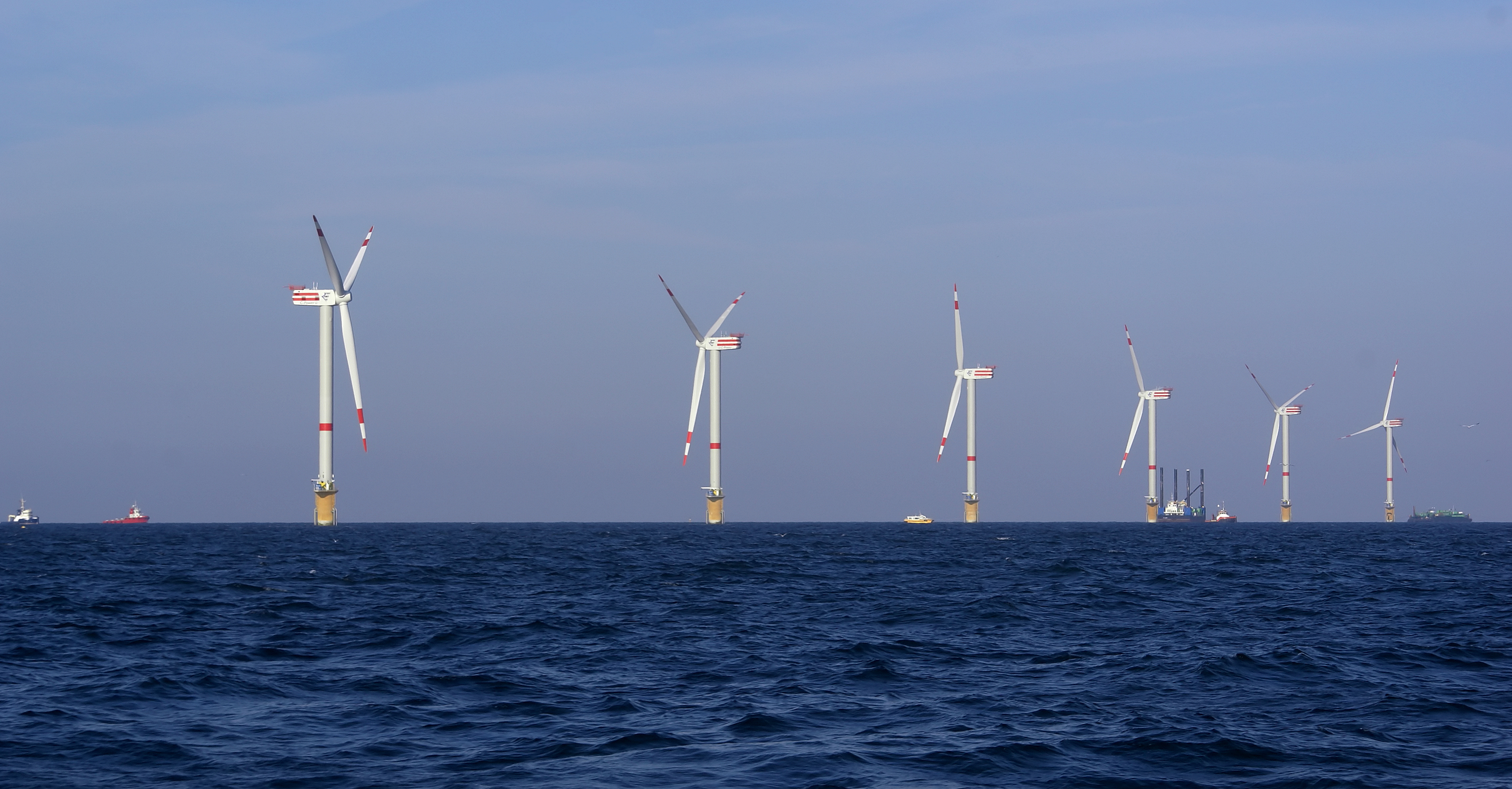
Wind turbines D1 to D6

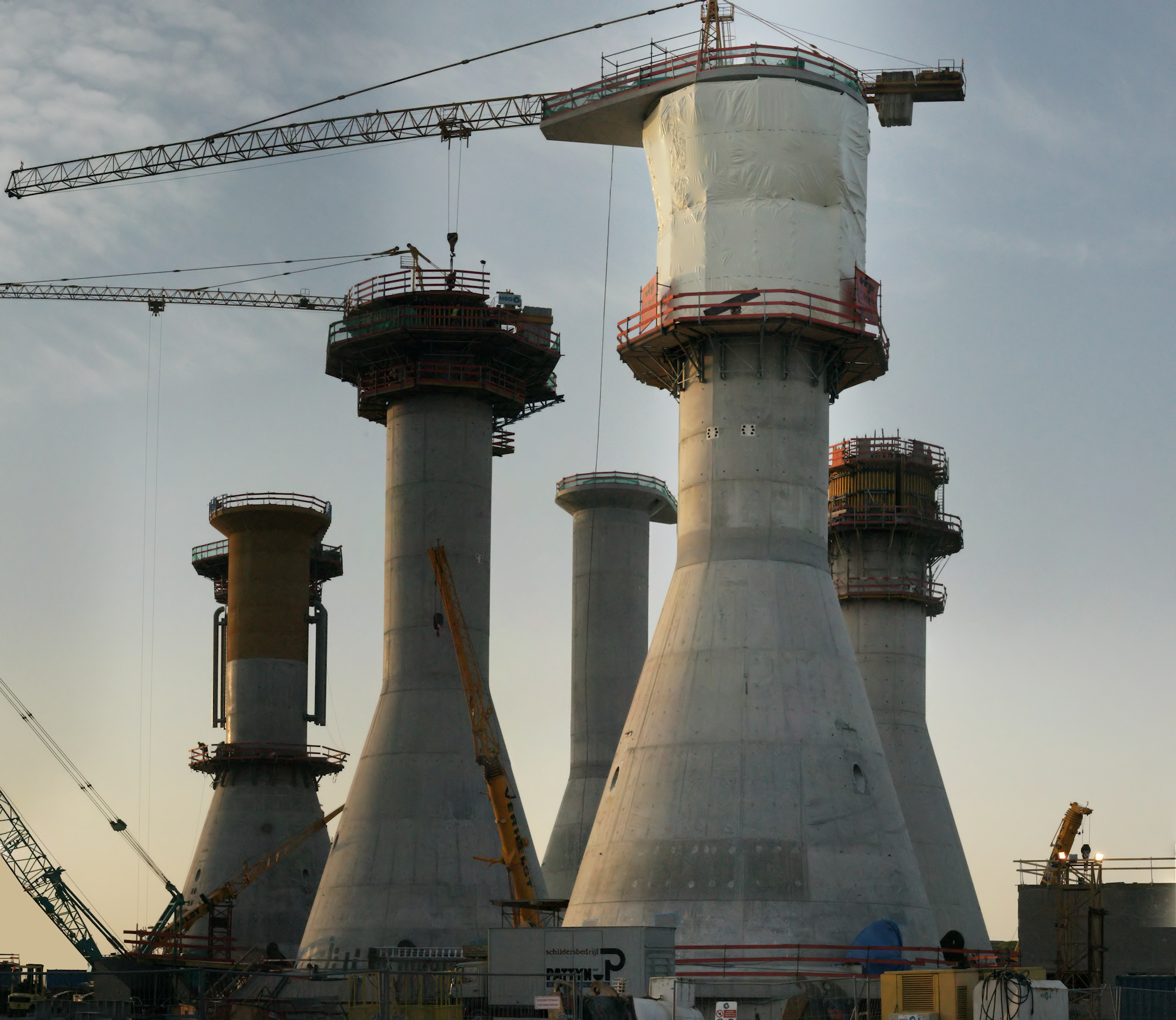
Wind turbine bases under construction

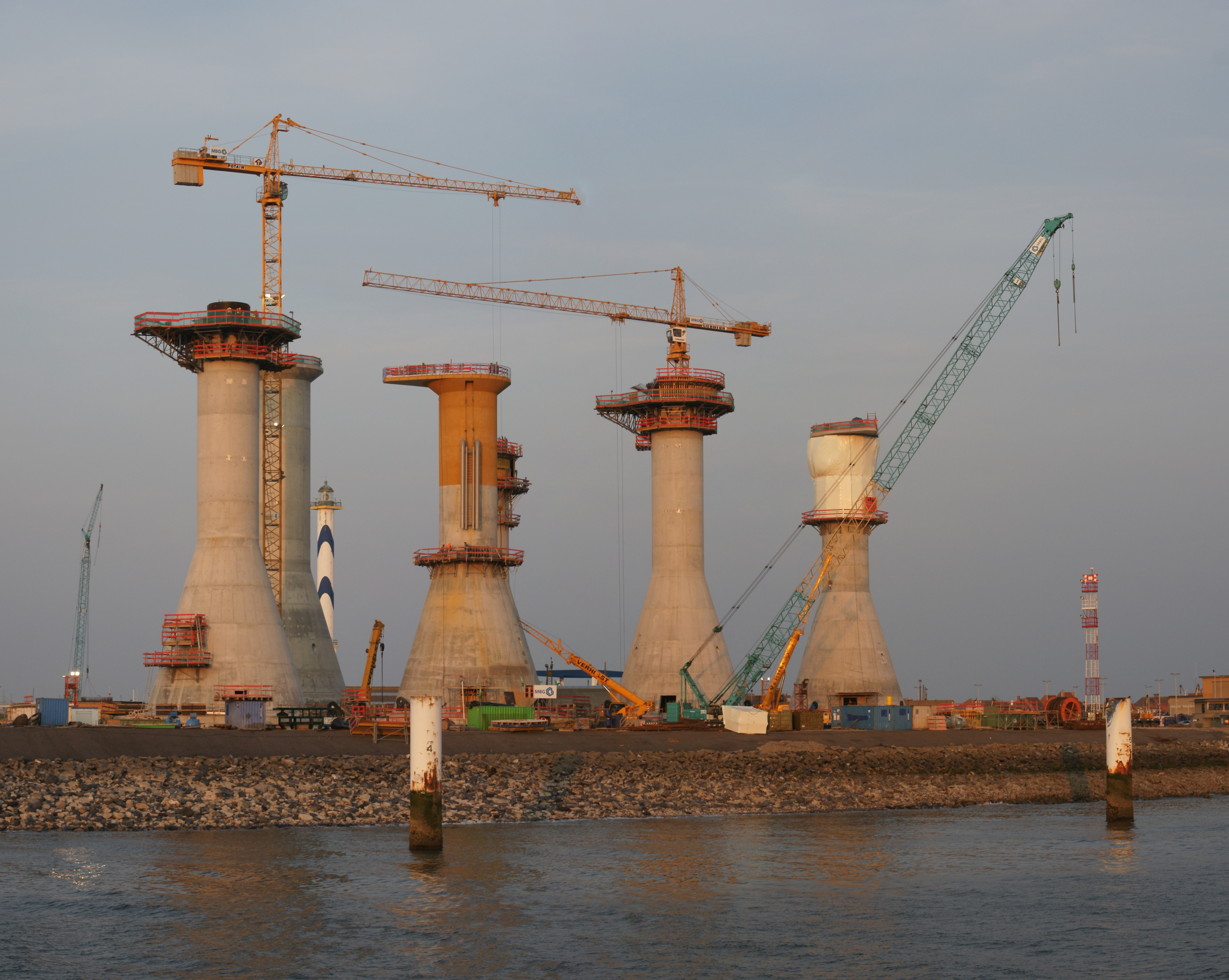
Wind turbine bases under construction

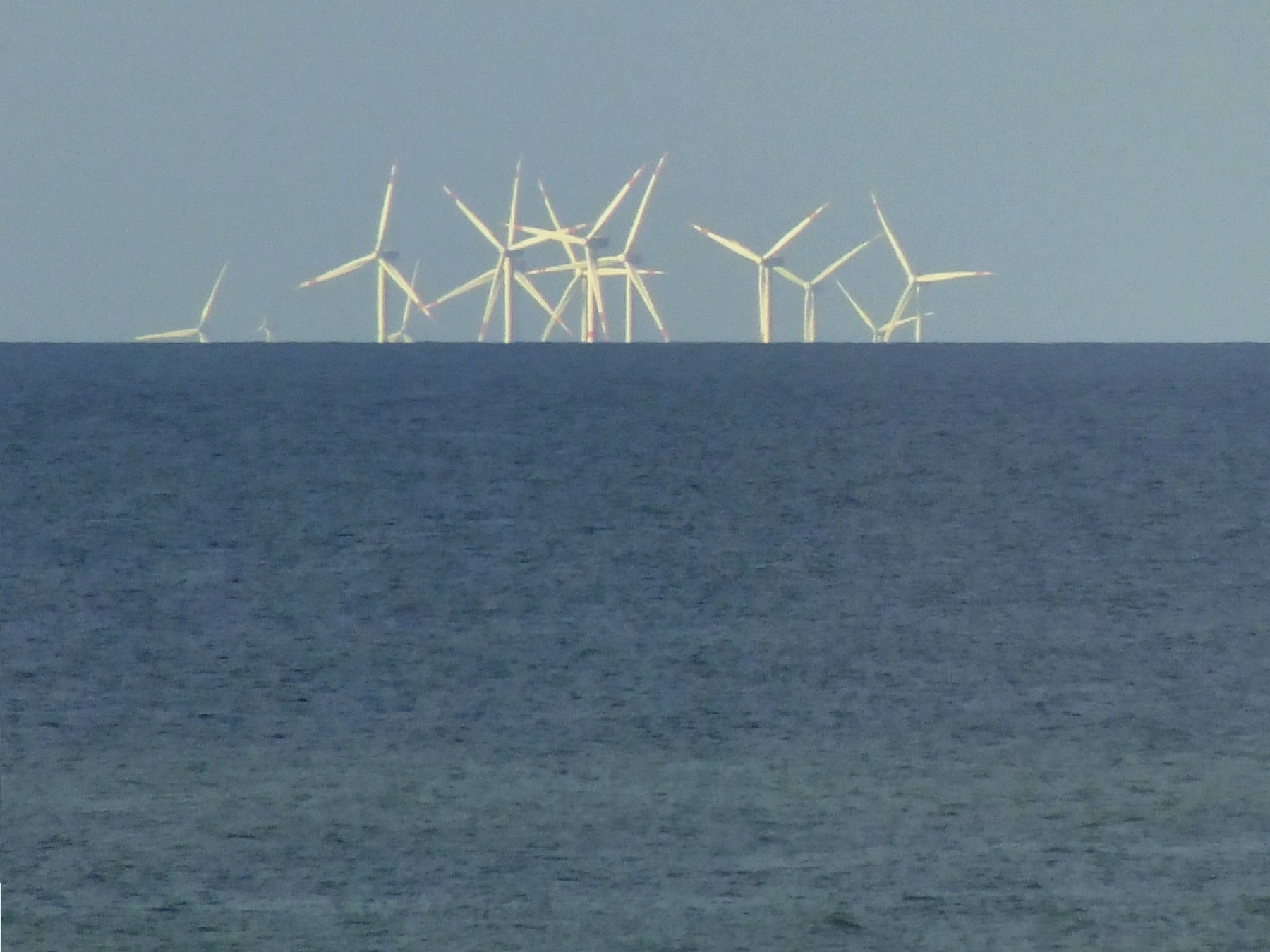
As seen from the Belgian coast, demonstrating the curvature of the Earth; the more distant windmills look to be underwater

== See also ==
- Belwind Offshore Wind Farm
- Wind power in Belgium
- Energy in Belgium
- List of offshore wind farms
- List of wind farms
