= Wind power in Belgium =

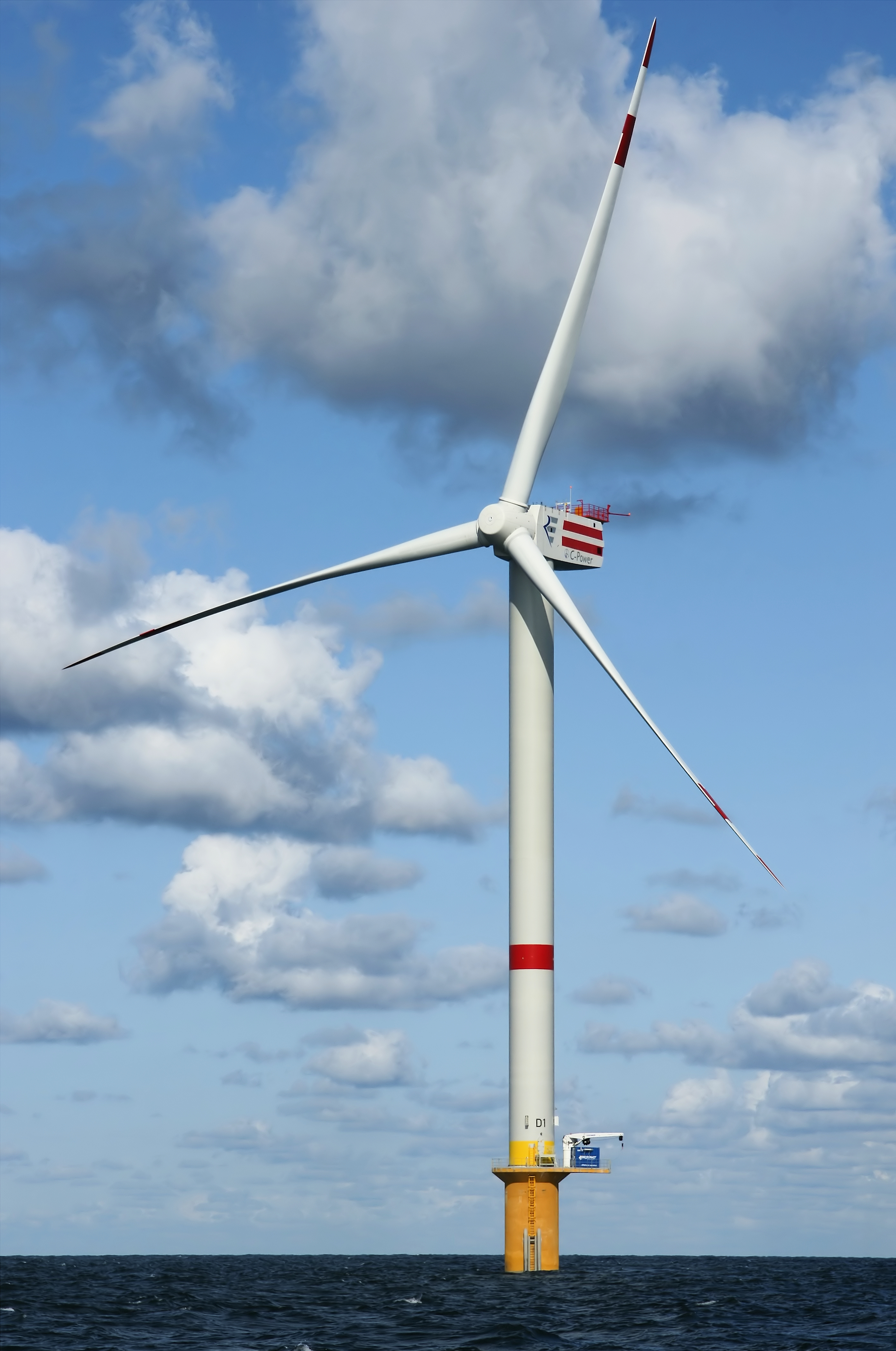
Wind turbine in the Thorntonbank Wind Farm

Wind power in Belgium has seen significant advancements, starting with the generation of electricity from offshore wind farms in 2009. By 2020, the capacity of these offshore farms reached 2,262 megawatts (MW), matching the combined output of Belgium's largest nuclear reactors, Doel 4 and Tihange 3. Concurrently, the development of on-shore wind energy, which remained minimal until 2004, experienced significant growth, with installed capacity and production doubling annually from 96 MW in 2004 to 2,476.1 MW by 2021. The percentage of electricity demand met by wind grew to about 14.4% by 2020.

Wind power depends partially on regional governments (Brussels-Capital Region, Flemish Region, Walloon Region) and partially on the Belgian federal government. Wind energy producers in both the Flemish and Walloon regions get green certificates but not with the same conditions.

As of 2021, Belgium was ranked sixth worldwide in offshore wind capacity, a notable accomplishment considering the constrained size of its territorial waters.

== Installed capacity and generation ==
Wind power installed capacity (MW) and generation (GWh) in Belgium
Year	Offshore		Land-based		Total electricity generation all sources (GWh)	Total wind generation (GWh)	Electrical generation met by wind (%)*
Year	Capacity (MW)	Generation (GWh)	Capacity (MW)	Generation (GWh)	Total electricity generation all sources (GWh)	Total wind generation (GWh)	Electrical generation met by wind (%)*
2000			14	16	84,012	16	0.02%
2001			26	37	79,821	37	0.05%
2002			31	57	82,069	57	0.07%
2003			67	88	84,643	88	0.10%
2004			96	142	85,025	142	0.17%
2005			167	227	87,025	227	0.26%
2006			212	366	85,617	366	0.43%
2007			276	491	88,822	491	0.55%
2008			324	637	84,930	637	0.75%
2009	30	82	577	914	91,235	996	1.09%
2010	197	190	716	1,102	95,189	1,292	1.36%
2011	197	709	873	1,603	90,241	2,312	2.56%
2012	381	854	989	1,897	82,923	2,751	3.32%
2013	708	1,540	1,084	2,147	83,526	3,687	4.41%
2014	708	2,216	1,222	2,398	72,687	4,614	6.35%
2015	712	2,613	1,517	2,855	68,138	5,468	8.02%
2016	712	2,340		3,048	~82,500	5,338	6.47%
2017	877	2,645		3,644	~82,900	6,289	7.59%
2018	1,186	3,408		3,196	~69,200	6,604	9.54%
2019	1,556	4,645	2,278	3,474			
2020	2,262	~6,700	2,408	~4,100			
* Based on table without other adjustments.

Wind turbines are installed offshore and onshore, mainly in the Flemish and in the Walloon Regions. Brussels-Capital Region is an urban area which is not particularly suited for large wind turbines. Smaller turbines more appropriate for urban environments are being studied but until today no technology is deemed sufficiently efficient.

== Offshore wind farms in the Belgian part of the North Sea ==
=== List of offshore wind farms ===
Offshore wind power current and future installations by project, 2023
Project name	Nameplate capacity (MW)	Turbines	Date operational	Depth range (m)	Distance to shore (km)
Thorntonbank (C-Power)	325	6 × REpower 5M126 5MW; 30 × REpower 6.2M126 6.15MW; 18 × REpower 6.2M126 6.15MW	2009 (phase 1); 2012 (phase 2); 2013 (phase 3)	14–28	30
Belwind (Bligh Bank phase 1)	171	55 × Vestas V90-3MW; 1 × Alstom Haliade 150 6MW	2010 (Vestas); 2013 (Haliade)	15–37	49
Northwind	216	72 × Vestas V112-3MW	2014	16–29	37
Nobelwind (Bligh Bank phase 2)	165	50 × Vestas V112-3.3MW	2017	26–38	47
Rentel	309	42 × Siemens SWT-7.0-154 7.35MW	2018	22–36	34
Norther	370	44 × MHI Vestas V164-8.4MW	2019	20–35	23
Northwester 2	219	23 × MHI Vestas V164-9.5MW	2020	25–40	51
SeaMade (Mermaid)	235	28 × Siemens Gamesa SG 8.0-167 DD 8.4MW	2020	24.4–39.5	54
SeaMade (Seastar)	252	30 × Siemens Gamesa SG 8.0-167 DD 8.4MW	2020	22–38	40
Total operational capacity	2262	399	from end 2020		

Offshore wind farm locations (interactive map)

=== Overview of offshore sector ===
Belgium initiated its offshore wind energy sector in 2003 by planning the nation's first wind farm in the North Sea. By 2004, a 156-square kilometer area within Belgium's Exclusive Economic Zone was allocated for wind farm development.

By 2020, Belgium had eight active offshore wind power projects totalling 399 turbines and 2262 MW of power, contributing 6.73 TWh. Offshore wind energy in the Belgian North Sea amounted to an installed capacity of 2,262 MW, which can produce an average of 8 TWh annually at 38% capacity factor, or around 10% of total electricity demand.

In 2021, the wind resource was less than usual, contributing 6.77 TWh (8% of the total demand of 84.4 TWh). The capacity factor (cf) was 34.4%.

The distance of the projects from shore typically range from 23 to 54 km, and the bathymetry of the water indicates the turbines will be based in waters typically between 14 and 40 meters deep. Some of the wind farms are connected via the Modular Offshore Grid.

The International Energy Agency (IEA) noted Belgium's significant offshore wind energy development, ranking it sixth globally in 2021. Anticipating the nuclear phase-out by 2025, Belgium introduced a EUR 1.2 billion plan to secure electricity and reduce emissions, focusing on expanding offshore wind and providing incentives for renewable energy solutions.

=== Active projects ===
==== C-Power ====
C-Power (Thorntonbank) was the first wind farm operational in the Belgian North Sea. Its first construction phase was completed in May 2009. This phase was a demonstration phase, with the installation of six turbines of 5 MW (= 30 MW). The construction of the second and the third phases was finalized in September 2013. A total of 48 turbines of 6.15 MW were installed during thoses two phases (= 295.2 MW). C-Power has therefore a total of 54 turbines, with a combined capacity of 325.2 MW. The turbines generate around 1050 GWh per year, which can provide electricity to 300.000 homes.

==== Belwind ====
Belwind (Bligh Bank Offshore Wind Farm) is a project by Parkwind NV. The Belwind wind farm has an installed capacity of 165 MW, which can provide electricity to 160.000 homes, and is operational since December 2010.

==== Northwind ====
Northwind is a project by Parkwind NV located on the Lodewijk Bank and has a total of 72 turbines of 3MW each, with a combined capacity of 216 MW. It was commissioned in May 2014 and can provide electricity to 250.000 homes.

==== Nobelwind ====
Nobelwind is a project by Parkwind NV. The Nobelwind wind farm was completed in May 2017 and is fully operational since December 2017. With its 50 windturbines of 3,3 MW each, the farm has a combined capacity of 165 MW, which can provide electricity to 160.000 homes.

==== Rentel ====
Rentel is a project by Otary RS. The Rentel wind farm has a total of 42 turbines of 7.35 MW each, with a combined capacity of 309 MW. It was commissioned in September 2018 and can provide electricity to 300.000 homes. Its transformer platform also carries electricity from SeaMade and Northwester 2.

==== Norther ====
The Norther wind farm has a total of 44 Vestas turbines with a 370 MW total capacity. The Norther wind project is operational since 2019.

==== Northwester 2 ====
Northwester 2 is a project by Parkwind NV. The Northwester 2 wind farm comprises 23 Vestas V164 turbines with a 219 MW capacity. The project reached full production in May 2020.

==== SeaMade ====
SeaMade is a project by Otary RS. The SeaMade wind farm is the result of the merger of the former Seastar and Mermaid projects. It consists therefore of two zones, the Seastar zone and the Mermaid zone, and 58 Siemens turbines with a capacity of 487 MW. The Seamade wind turbines started producing green energy end 2020.

== Historical data Flemish region ==
Year	Capacity (MW)	Number of turbines
1999	1	1
2001	4	3
2002	11	8
2003	22	14
2004	38	23
2005	84	47
2006	105	59
2007	126	69
2008	148	80
2009	203	111
2010	220	119
2011	312	160
2012	389	195
2012	389	195
2013	436	216
2014	567	275
2015	776	363
2016	901	413
2017	1113	486
2018	1203	518
2019	1278	543
2020	1361	573
2021	1543	619
2022	1748	672
2023	1826	698
2024	1858	703

At the end of 2022 there were 672 operational onshore wind turbines with a combined capacity of 1748MW. The wind turbines are installed in small groups throughout the region, often along highways or canals and in industrial or agricultural areas. The operators of these wind farms are diverse. Some are operated by companies that specialize in wind power, others by traditional electricity producers. Several are operated by cooperatives. Finally a few are operated by organisations with a different core business as part of a Corporate social responsibility strategy.

Installed capacity per province (as of 2022):

- West Flanders: 15%
- East Flanders: 34%
- Antwerp: 26%
- Limburg: 21%
- Flemish Brabant: 4%

== Historical data Walloon Region ==
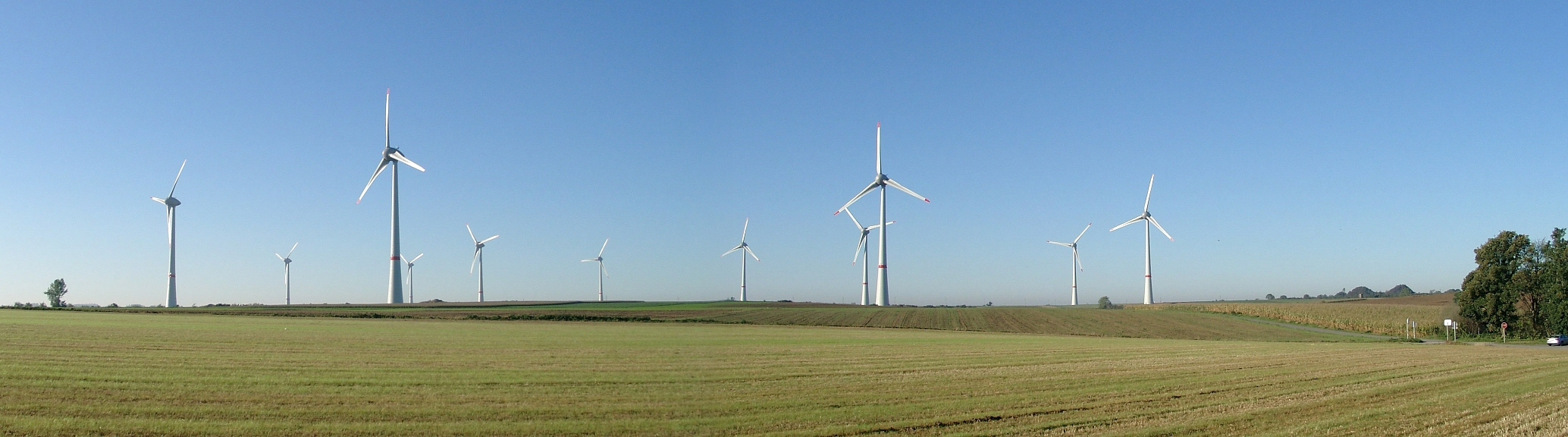
Wind farm in Estinnes

Year	Capacity (MW)	Number of turbines	Estimated annual production (GWh)
2005	49.2	35	71
2006	72.5	49	126
2007	122.9	77	209
2008	161.5	98	297
2009	319.7	158	498
2010	441.6	202	704
2011	524.0	241	1032
2012	562.6	251	1198
2013	599.3	271	1239
2014	639.7	285	1330
2015	675.1	305	1504
2016	737.1	329	1408
2017	835.4	366	1567
2018	909.3	395	1360
2019	1036.0	440	1534
2020	1050.0	n/a	n/a
2021	1144.0	n/a	n/a
2022	1242.0	n/a	n/a

This region is home to the largest turbines in Belgium. The Windvision (operated by China General Nuclear) wind farm near Estinnes houses 11 Enercon E-126 turbines each with a total height of 198.5 metres and a generation power of 6 MW. As part of the EU demonstration project 7MW-WEC-by-11, ten turbines have been upgraded to 7.5 MW.

== See also ==
- Energy in Belgium
- List of wind turbines in Belgium
- Solar power in Belgium
- Renewable energy by country
