= Riffgat =

German offshore wind farm

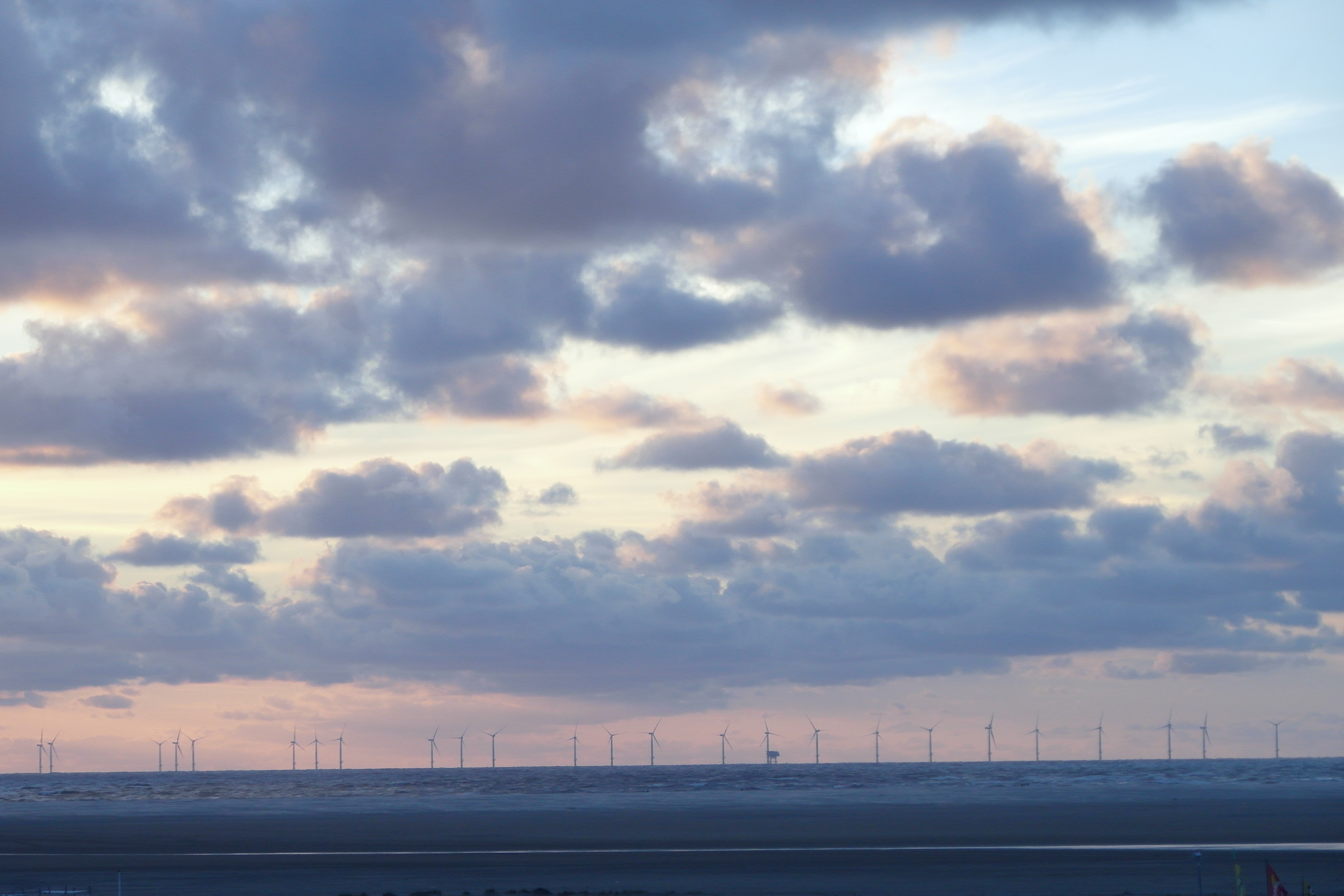
- Country: Germany
- Location: North Sea
- Coordinates: 53°41′N 6°29′E
- Status: Operational
- Commission date: 12 February 2014
- Owners: ENOVA Energiesysteme; EWE

Wind farm
- Type: Offshore
- Max. water depth: 16–24 m (52–79 ft)
- Distance from shore: 15 km (9 mi)
- Rotor diameter: 120 m (390 ft)
- Site area: 6 km^{2} (2 sq mi)

Power generation
- Units operational: 30 × 3.78 MW
- Make and model: Siemens Gamesa SWT-3.6-120 (30)
- Nameplate capacity: 113.4 MW

External links
- Website: www.riffgat.de
- Commons: Related media on Commons

Wind farm layout

Borkum Riffgat's location in the wind farms of the German Bight

Riffgat (also known as Borkum Riffgat and OWP Riffgat) is an offshore wind farm 15 kilometres (9.3 mi) to the north-west of the German island of Borkum and north of the eponymous shipping channel in the southern North Sea. The wind turbines are built across an area of 6 square kilometres (2.3 sq mi). It consists of 30 turbines with a total capacity of 108 megawatt (MW), and is expected to generate enough electricity for 112,000 households.

Early 2011, the Dutch government stated that the wind farm was partly in Dutch territory and protested against the issuing of construction licenses by the German government. The issue was resolved in 2014 with the signing of the Ems-Dollart-Treaty.

Between November 2015 and April 2016, transmission problems prevented Riffgat from exporting power.

== See also ==
- Wind power in Germany
- List of Offshore Wind Farms
