= Belwind Offshore Wind Farm =

Belgian offshore wind farm in the North Sea

Belwind
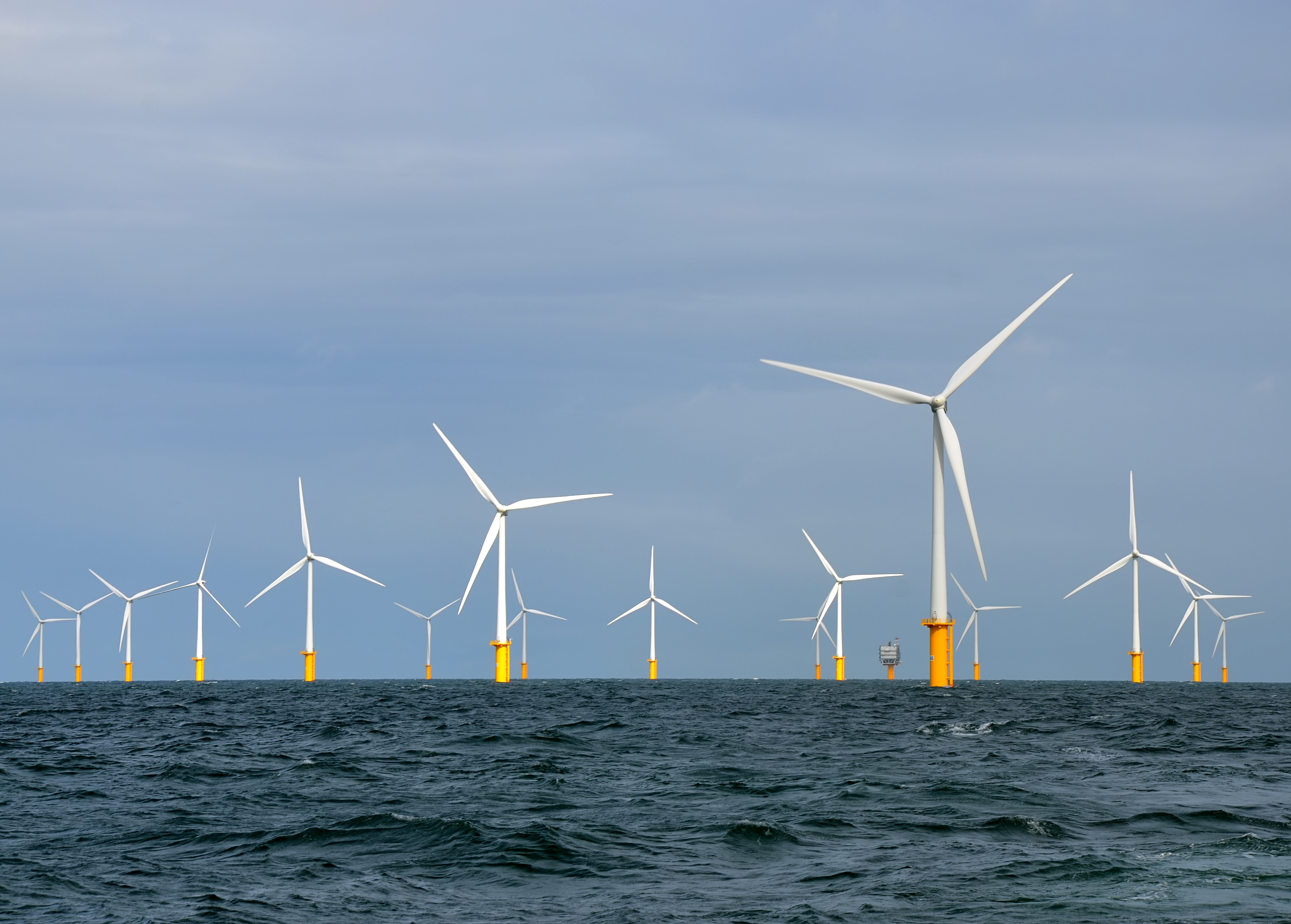
- Country: Belgium
- Location: Ostend, Zeebrugge region, North Sea
- Coordinates: 51°40′N 2°48′E
- Status: Operational
- Commission date: 9 December 2010
- Owner: Belwind NV

Wind farm
- Type: Offshore
- Max. water depth: 37 m (121 ft)
- Distance from shore: 46 km (29 mi)
- Hub height: 72 m (236 ft)
- Rotor diameter: 90 m (300 ft)
- Rated wind speed: 15 m/s (49 ft/s)
- Site area: 17 km^{2} (6.6 sq mi)

Power generation
- Units operational: 55 × 3 MW; 1 × 6 MW
- Make and model: GE Renewable Energy Haliade 150-6MW (1); Vestas V90/3000 (55)
- Nameplate capacity: 171 MW

External links
- Website: belwind.eu/en/home
- Commons: Related media on Commons

Wind farm layout

The Belwind Wind Farm is located in Bligh Bank, 46 kilometres (29 mi) from the Belgian port of Zeebrugge, and has been built in two phases. It has a 330 MW production capacity and an estimated annual output of 1.1 TWh. Phase 1 had a 165 MW production capacity.

== Financing ==
Bligh Bank is the first stage of what is planned to be a 330 MW project. It was financed under a Project Finance structure by Project Company ‘Belwind’, after a number of delays that included bankruptcy of developer Econcern. Financial completion was eventually reached on 27 July 2009. Bligh Bank is only the third offshore wind farm to be Project Financed, following Q7 and Thornton Bank. The €614 million deal sees Colruyt Group, the Colruyt family, SHV, ParticipatieMaatschappij Vlaanderen, Meewind and Rabo Project Equity, come together to invest in the construction of the 165 MW first stage of the Project. For the first time the European Investment Bank will assume project finance risk for an offshore wind farm, by granting €300 million towards financing the Project.

In January 2011, SHV sold its 20,7 % equity-share to the other Belgian shareholders Colruyt Group, the Colruyt family and ParticipatieMaatschappij Vlaanderen. The financial close of the Second Phase of the project was on 6 October 2015.

== First phase ==
Construction of the first phase commenced in August 2009 and was completed on 9 December 2010. The wind farm includes an Offshore High Voltage Station which converts the infield 33kV to the export cable (150kV). This export cable is connected to the second high-voltage station, (the Booster Transformer Station) in Zeebrugge. In 2012, Alstom planned to install a wind turbine of 6 MW Haliade as a test, which happened in November 2013.

== Second phase ==
The construction of the second phase was mostly in 2016, with the first foundation on 12 May, first turbine on 27 of October and first electricity production 9 January 2017. The park has been fully commissioned as of 24 May 2017.

== Revenue ==
The Belwind Wind Farm has a green certificate, meaning it will receive a set minimum price through Elia, €107 per MWh for the first 216 MW, the remaining 114 MW will receive €90 per MWh. In 2011, it received €49,51 per MWh through the sale of the generated electricity to Electrabel.

== See also ==
- Thorntonbank Wind Farm (Belgium)
- Wind power in Belgium
- List of offshore wind farms
- List of offshore wind farms in the North Sea
- Lists of offshore wind farms by country
