= Amrumbank West =

German offshore wind farm in the North Sea

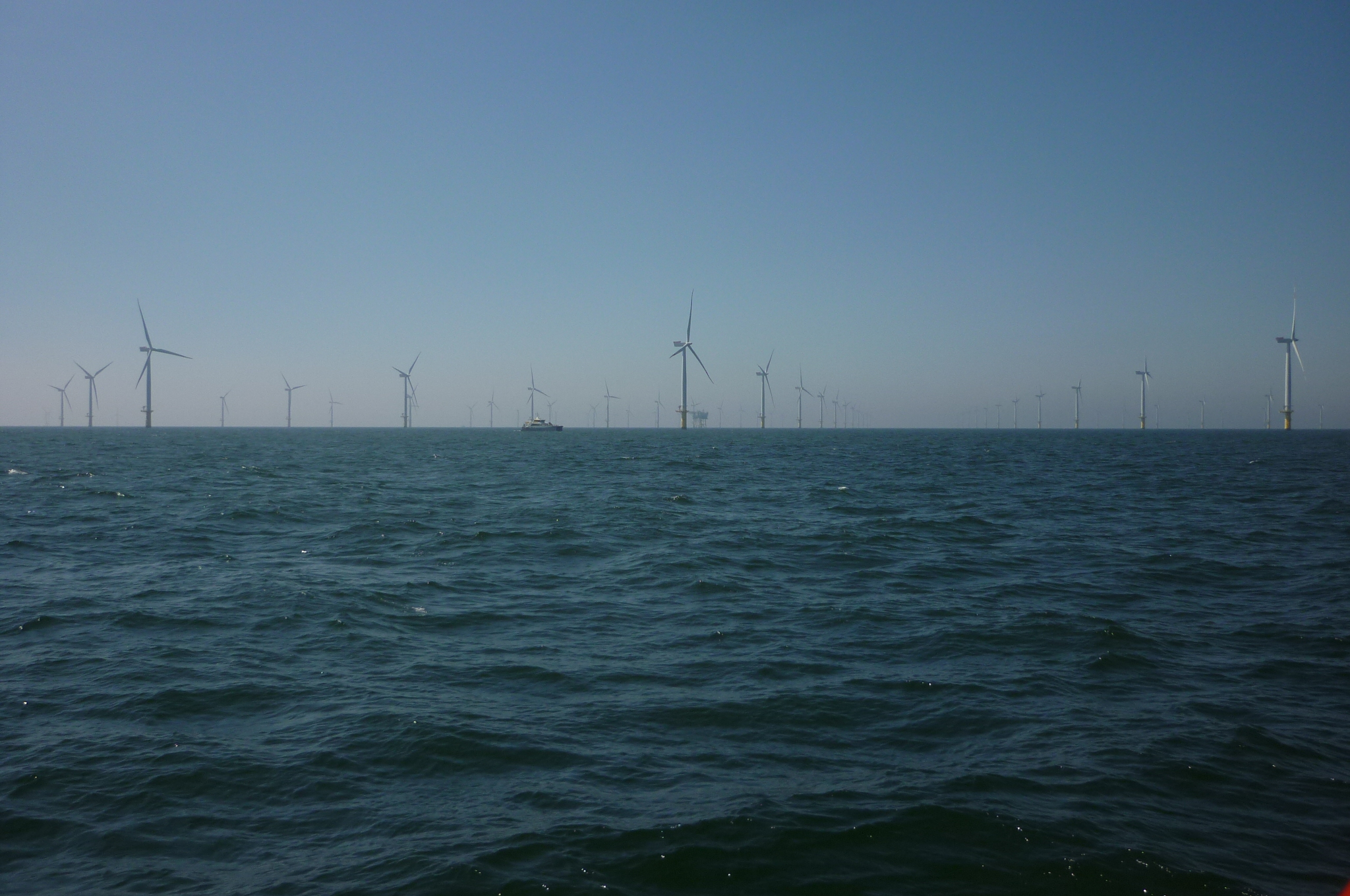
- Country: Germany
- Location: North Sea, ~35 km (22 mi) north of Helgoland
- Coordinates: 54°31′22″N 7°42′17″E
- Status: Operational
- Commission date: October 2015
- Owner: RWE AG

Wind farm
- Type: Offshore
- Rotor diameter: 120 m (390 ft)

Power generation
- Units operational: 80 × 3.6 MW
- Make and model: Siemens Gamesa SWT-3.6-120 (80)
- Nameplate capacity: 288 MW

Wind farm layout

Amrumbank West's location in the wind farms of the German Bight

Amrumbank West in a German offshore wind farm in the North Sea owned by RWE. It is located about 35 km northwest of the island of Heligoland and around 18 km south-west of the Amrum Bank sandbank. It consists of 80 turbines in waters 19–24 m deep.

== Construction ==
Construction cost was around €1 billion. The project was delayed 15 months by the lack of power lines. The 80 wind turbines are Siemens SWT-3.6–120 with a rated power of 3.6 MW and a rotor diameter of 120 meters. Offshore construction began in 2013, and the first turbine was installed in February 2015. The wind farm was commissioned at the end of 2015.

== Seabed protection ==
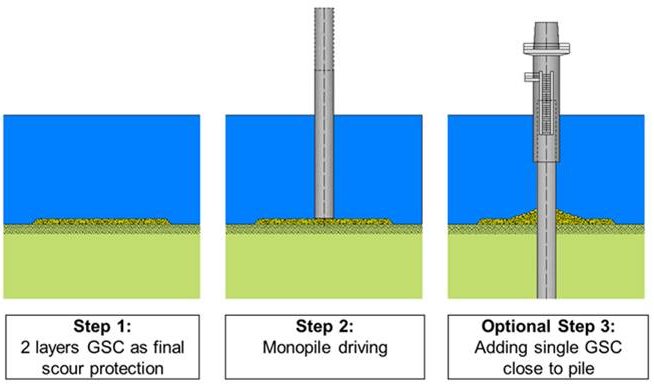
Installation of turbine piles at Amrumbank West through the erosion protection layers.

The seabed surface at the construction site mainly consists of sand. It was initially reinforced by a 2.4-m-thick layer of large stones. However, this hindered installation of the turbine piles, which should be driven through the protection layer deep into the seabed. Therefore, stones were replaced by two layers of geotextile containers, i.e., sandbags made of a special damage-resistant nonwoven geotextile. Empty bags had a size of 1.45 × 2.38 m and could accommodate 1 m^{3} of sand; they were filled on the Rømø island up to 80 vol% and weighed 1400 kg each. The seabed protection withstood the St. Jude storm in October 2013 and Cyclone Xaver in December 2013. Starting from December 2013, turbine piles 6 m in diameter were driven through the erosion protection layers.

== See also ==
- List of offshore wind farms in Germany
- Wind power in Germany
- List of offshore wind farms
