= Nordsee-Ost offshore wind farm =

Offshore wind farm in the North Sea

Nordsee-Ost
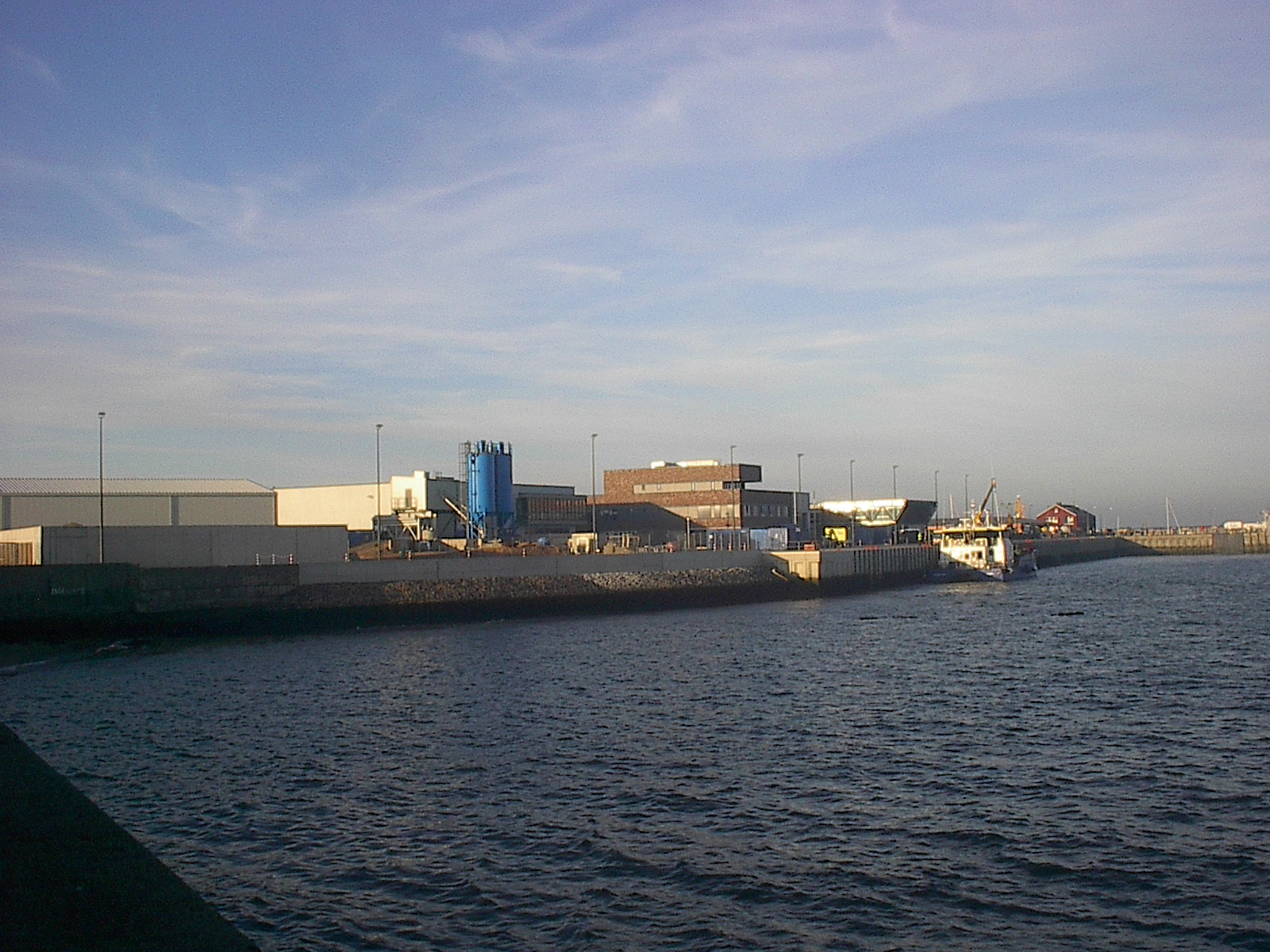
- Nordsee-Ost wind farm operations base on the island of Heligoland
- Country: Germany
- Location: North Sea
- Coordinates: 54°26′N 7°41′E
- Status: Operational
- Commission date: 11 May 2015
- Owner: Innogy

Wind farm
- Type: Offshore
- Max. water depth: 25 m
- Distance from shore: 57 km
- Hub height: 92 m
- Rotor diameter: 126 m (413 ft)
- Site area: 36 km^{2}

Power generation
- Units operational: 48 × 6.15 MW
- Make and model: Senvion 6.2M126 (48)
- Nameplate capacity: 295.2 MW

External links
- Website: Nordsee Ost
- Commons: Related media on Commons

Wind farm layout

Nordsee Ost's location in the wind farms of the German Bight

Nordsee-Ost offshore wind farm is an offshore wind farm in operation in the eastern part of the North Sea German sector. The project was developed by RWE Innogy, a subsidiary of RWE.

The wind farm consists of 48 turbines with a total capacity of 295 MW. The 6.15 MW turbines were provided by REpower. Steel foundations for generators were supplied by Aker Verdal. Power converters were supplied by Woodward Governor Company. A consortium of Siemens and Prysmian built the high-voltage direct current submarine cable from the wind farm to the German transmission system operated by Transpower, a subsidiary of TenneT.

Delays in power line construction by Dutch TenneT delayed its operational start.

On 11 May 2015 the wind farm was officially put into operation.

== See also ==
- Wind power in Germany
