= HVDC HelWin1 =

Offshore HVDC transmission line in Germany

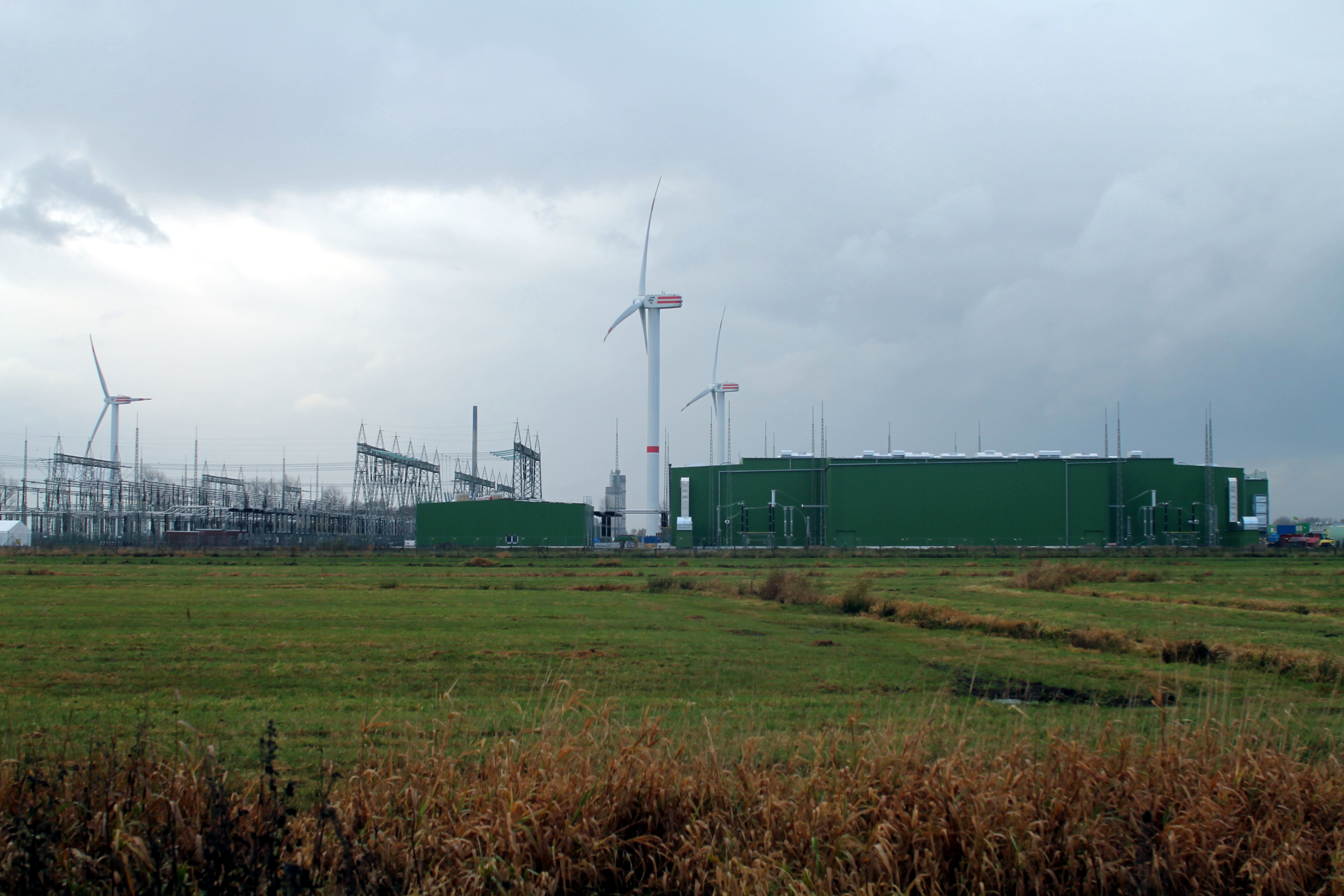
- The land converter station for HelWin1, HelWin2 and SylWin1 at Büttel
- Map of HVDC HelWin1

Location
- Country: Germany
- From: HelWin Alpha platform
- Passes through: North Sea
- To: Büttel 53°55′01″N 9°13′55″E.

Construction information
- Cable manufacturer: Prysmian
- Substation manufacturer: Siemens
- Expected: 2015

Technical information
- Type: subsea+underground
- Current type: HVDC
- Total length: 130 km (81 mi)
- Capacity: 576 MW
- AC voltage: 380 kV (onshore side); 155 kV (offshore side)
- DC voltage: ±250 kV
- No. of poles: 1 (symmetrical monopole)

HVDC HelWin1 is a high voltage direct current (HVDC) link built to transmit offshore wind power to the power grid of the German mainland. The project differs from most HVDC systems in that one of the two converter stations is built on a platform in the sea. Voltage-Sourced Converters are used and the total cable length is 130 km. The project was completed and handed over to its owner, TenneT, in February 2015.

== Context ==
HelWin1 is part of an ambitious programme of providing grid connections to offshore wind parks off the coast of Germany, in the German Bight, as part of the German Energiewende (Energy Transition) programme. HelWin1 forms part of the HelWin cluster, named after the German island of Heligoland. HelWin1 has been built to transport power from the Nordsee Ost and Meerwind Süd/Ost wind parks.

HVDC has been chosen for most of the grid connections because the relatively long distance involved – both from the wind park to shore and from the shore to the nearest suitable connection point to the onshore grid - makes conventional alternating current transmission uneconomic.

== Technical aspects ==
HelWin1 uses Voltage Sourced Converters (VSC) to convert from AC to DC and back again, using 4.5 kV IGBTs as the switching elements. One converter is provided at each end of the link with a DC voltage of ±250 kV and a transmission capacity of 576 MW. The converters, built by Siemens, use the Modular Multi-Level Converter technology, in the symmetrical monopole configuration. Each converter station is equipped with two, three-phase transformers in parallel, each rated at 425 MVA (offshore) and 422 MVA (onshore). Each converter valve is equipped with a dry-type valve reactor of 50 mH.

The offshore converter is located on the HelWin Alpha platform, which was built by Nordic Yards in Warnemünde. The topside of the platform is of the float-over type which is designed to be floated out to the installation site and then jacked up onto the submerged supporting structure using the support legs that are integral to the structure. The topside has a total weight of 12000 tonnes and measures 75 m x 50 m x 23 m high.

Each of the two 250 kV cables linking HelWin Alpha to the onshore substation has a total length of 130 km, of which 85 km is sea cable and 45 km is underground land cable. The sea cables come ashore close to Büsum and continue, as land cables, to the onshore converter station at Büttel. The cables were supplied by Prysmian and use extruded Cross-linked polyethylene insulation.

== Construction schedule ==
The HelWin1 project was ordered in 2010. The platform was installed on 26 August 2013. Commissioning was completed in January 2015 and the project was handed over to TenneT in February 2015 although at the time of hand-over, only 288 MW of wind power was connected to the converter station

== Connected wind farms ==
- Meerwind Süd | Ost (288 MW)
- Nordsee-Ost (295.2 MW)

== See also ==
- High-voltage direct current
- Offshore wind power
- HVDC BorWin1
- HVDC BorWin2
- HVDC BorWin3
- HVDC DolWin1
- HVDC DolWin2
- HVDC DolWin3
- HVDC HelWin2
- HVDC SylWin1
