= HVDC DolWin3 =

Offshore HVDC connection in Germany

- Location of HVDC DolWin3

Location
- Country: Germany
- General direction: north–south
- From: Platform DolWin Gamma
- Passes through: North Sea
- To: Dörpen/West substation

Technical information
- Type: submarine cable, subsoil cable
- Current type: HVDC

HVDC DolWin3 is a high voltage direct current (HVDC) link to transmit Offshore wind power to the power grid of the German mainland. The project differs from most HVDC systems in that one of the two converter stations is built on a platform in the sea. Voltage-Sourced Converters with DC ratings of 900 MW, ±320 kV are used and the total cable length is 160 km.

The overall project is being built by Alstom with the cables supplied by Prysmian and offshore platform by Nordic Yards. Construction commenced on the onshore converter station at Dörpen West in May 2014 and on the offshore platform in October 2014. As of summer 2015 the platform was being fitted out and the first converter transformer was installed on 17 July 2015. The project was handed over to its owner, TenneT, in 2017. The grid connection is in operation since September 2018. A fund managed by Copenhagen Infrastructure Partners has invested in this offshore transmission platform.

== Connected wind farms ==
- Merkur (396 MW)
- Borkum Riffgrund II (448 MW)

== See also ==
- High-voltage direct current
- Offshore wind power
- HVDC BorWin1
- HVDC BorWin2
- HVDC BorWin3
- HVDC DolWin1
- HVDC DolWin2
- HVDC HelWin1
- HVDC HelWin2
- HVDC SylWin1
