= HVDC BorWin3 =

Offshore HVDC connection in Germany

- Location of HVDC BorWin3

Location
- Country: Germany
- General direction: north–south
- From: Platform BorWin Gamma
- Passes through: North Sea
- To: Emden/Ost substation

Technical information
- Type: submarine cable, subsoil cable
- Current type: HVDC

HVDC BorWin3 is a high voltage direct current (HVDC) link under construction to transmit offshore wind power to the power grid of the German mainland. The project differs from most HVDC systems in that one of the two converter stations is built on a platform in the sea. Voltage-Sourced Converters with DC ratings of 900 MW, ±320 kV are used and the total cable length is 160 km. The project is the most recent of the German offshore HVDC projects to be awarded (in 2014). It is being built by the Siemens/ Petrofac consortium with the offshore platform contract awarded to Drydocks World in Dubai. The project is expected to be handed over to its owner, TenneT, in 2019. The project started power transmission in August 2019. TenneT took control of operations in February 2020.

== See also ==
- High-voltage direct current
- Offshore wind power
- HVDC BorWin1
- HVDC BorWin2
- HVDC DolWin1
- HVDC DolWin2
- HVDC DolWin3
- HVDC HelWin1
- HVDC HelWin2
- HVDC SylWin1
