= HVDC DolWin1 =

- Map of HVDC DolWin1

Location
- Country: Germany
- From: DolWin Alpha platform
- Passes through: North Sea
- To: Dörpen-West/Heede 52°58′52″N 7°15′26″E

Construction information
- Cable manufacturer: ABB
- Substation manufacturer: ABB
- Expected: 2015

Technical information
- Type: subsea+underground
- Current type: HVDC
- Total length: 165 km (103 mi)
- Capacity: 800 MW
- AC voltage: 380 kV (onshore side)
- DC voltage: ±320 kV
- No. of poles: 1 (symmetrical monopole)

HVDC DolWin1 is a high voltage direct current link built to transmit offshore wind power to the power grid of the German mainland. The project differs from most HVDC systems in that one of the two converter stations is built on a platform in the sea. Voltage-Sourced Converters are used and the total cable length is 165 km. The project was built by ABB and was handed over to its owner, TenneT, in July 2015, the fifth such project to be completed in Germany in 2015.

== Context ==
DolWin1 is part of an ambitious programme of providing grid connections to offshore wind parks off the coast of Germany, in the German Bight, as part of the German Energiewende (Energy Transition) programme. DolWin1 forms part of the DolWin cluster, named after the bay of Dollart on the German/Dutch border. DolWin1 has been built to transport power from the Trianel Borkum-West II wind park.

HVDC has been chosen for most of the grid connections because the relatively long distance involved – both from the wind park to shore and from the shore to the nearest suitable connection point to the onshore grid - makes conventional alternating current transmission uneconomic.

== Technical aspects ==
DolWin1 uses Voltage Sourced Converters (VSC) to convert from AC to DC and back again, using IGBTs as the switching elements. One converter is provided at each end of the link with a DC voltage of ±320 kV and a transmission capacity of 800 MW. The converters, built by ABB, use a topology referred to as the Cascaded Two-Level Converter (a type of Modular Multi-Level Converter), in the symmetrical monopole configuration. Each converter station is equipped with two, three-phase transformers in parallel, each rated at 590MVA.

The offshore converter is located on the DolWin Alpha offshore platform, which was built by Heerema in Zwijndrecht, Netherlands. The topside measures 64 m x 42 m x 38 m and weighs 12000 tonnes.

Each of the two 320 kV cables linking DolWin Alpha to the onshore substation has a total length of 165 km, of which 75 km is sea cable and 90 km is underground land cable. The cables were supplied by ABB and use extruded Cross-linked polyethylene insulation.

== Construction schedule ==
The DolWin1 project was ordered in 2010 and the platform was installed in August 2013. Trial operation with the Borkum West wind park commenced in December 2014 and the project was handed over in July 2015.

== Connected wind farms ==
- Trianel Windpark Borkum (403.2 MW)
- Borkum Riffgrund I (312 MW)

== See also ==
- High-voltage direct current
- Offshore wind power
- HVDC BorWin1
- HVDC BorWin2
- HVDC BorWin3
- HVDC DolWin2
- HVDC DolWin3
- HVDC HelWin1
- HVDC HelWin2
- HVDC SylWin1
