= HVDC DolWin2 =

Offshore HVDC connection in Germany

DolWin2
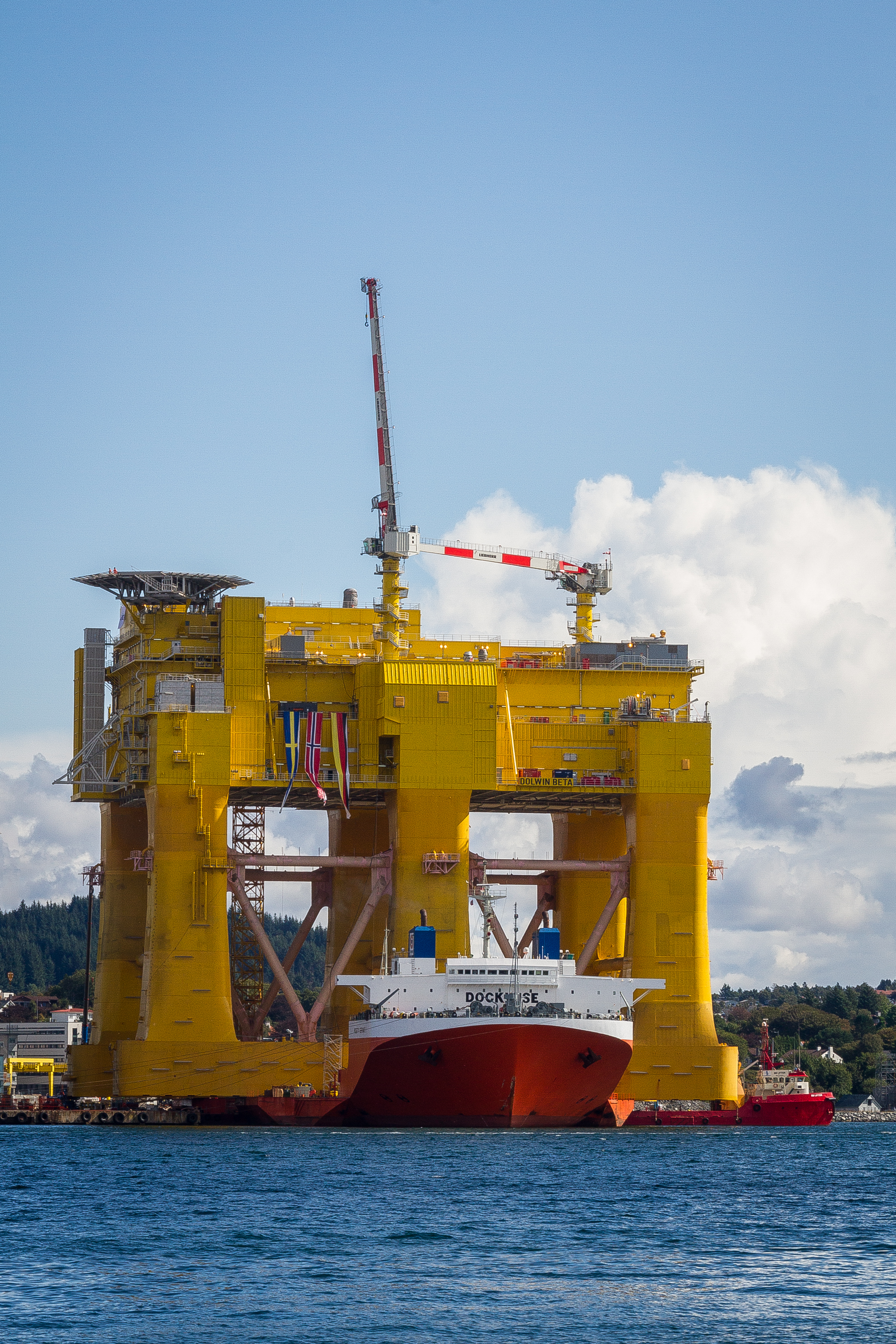
- The DolWin Beta platform arriving in Haugesund in August 2014.
- Map of DolWin2

Location
- Country: Germany
- From: DolWin Beta Offshore Converter Platform
- Passes through: North Sea
- To: Dörpen West Converter Station

Ownership information
- Owner: TenneT
- Operator: TenneT

Technical information
- Total length: 135 km (84 mi)
- Capacity: 900 MW
- DC voltage: 320 kV

HVDC DolWin2 is a high voltage direct current (HVDC) link to transmit offshore wind power to the power grid of the German mainland. The project differs from most HVDC systems in that one of the two converter stations is built on a platform in the sea. Voltage-Sourced Converters with DC ratings of 900 MW, ±320 kV are used and the total cable length is 135 km. The project is similar to the HVDC DolWin1 project but has a slightly higher power rating and uses a different design of offshore platform. The platform was designed by Norwegian company Aibel and built by Drydocks World in Dubai and transported to Europe in the summer of 2014 to be fitted out at the Aibel yard in Haugesund in Norway. The platform, which is of a floating, self-installing design not previously used in an HVDC project, sailed out from Haugesund on 1 August 2015 and was installed in the North Sea ten days later.

The overall project was built by ABB and was handed over to its owner, TenneT, in 2017.

== Connected wind farms ==
- Gode Wind I (330 MW)
- Gode Wind II (252 MW)
- Nordsee One (332 MW)

== See also ==
- High-voltage direct current
- Offshore wind power
- HVDC BorWin1
- HVDC BorWin2
- HVDC BorWin3
- HVDC DolWin1
- HVDC DolWin3
- HVDC HelWin1
- HVDC HelWin2
- HVDC SylWin1
