= HVDC SylWin1 =

Offshore HVDC connection in Germany

SylWin1
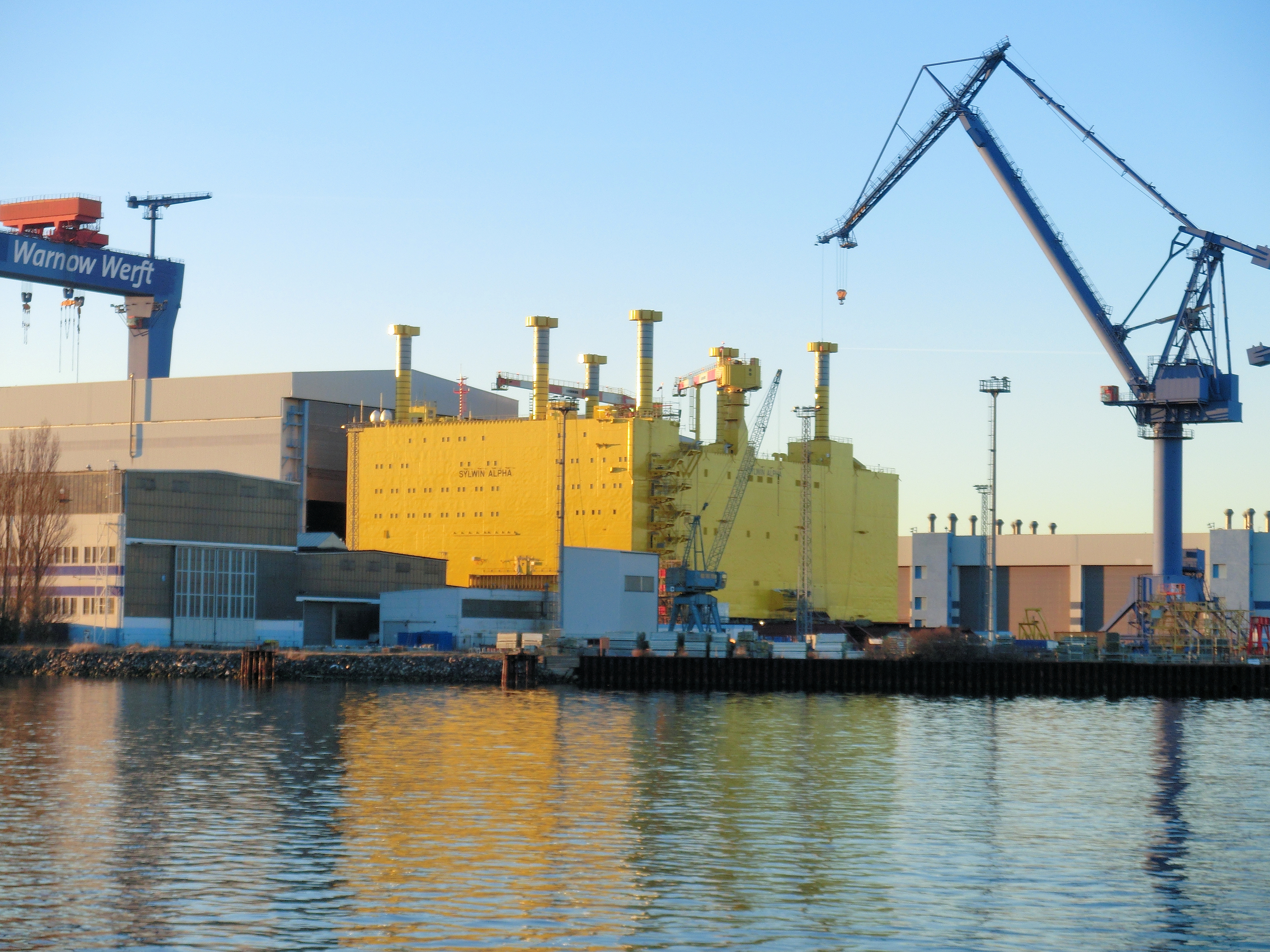
- Construction of the SylWin alpha offshore converter platform at the Warnowwerft Rostock shipyard
- Map of SylWin1

Location
- Country: Germany
- From: SylWin Alpha Offshore Converter Platform
- Passes through: North Sea
- To: Büttel Converter Station

Ownership information
- Owner: TenneT
- Operator: TenneT

Technical information
- Total length: 205 km (127 mi)
- Capacity: 864 MW
- DC voltage: 320 kV

HVDC SylWin1 is a high voltage direct current (HVDC) link to transmit offshore wind power to the power grid of the German mainland. The project differs from most HVDC systems in that one of the two converter stations is built on a platform in the sea. Voltage-Sourced Converters with DC ratings of 864 MW, ±320 kV are used and the total cable length is 205 km. The project is similar to the HVDC BorWin2 project but has slightly higher power and voltage ratings. It is being built by the Siemens/ Prysmian consortium and was handed over to its owner, TenneT, in April 2015.

== Connected wind farms ==
- Butendiek (288 MW)
- DanTysk (288 MW)
- Sandbank (288 MW)

== See also ==
- High-voltage direct current
- Offshore wind power
- HVDC BorWin1
- HVDC BorWin2
- HVDC BorWin3
- HVDC DolWin1
- HVDC DolWin2
- HVDC DolWin3
- HVDC HelWin1
- HVDC HelWin2
