= HVDC BorWin2 =

Offshore HVDC connection in Germany

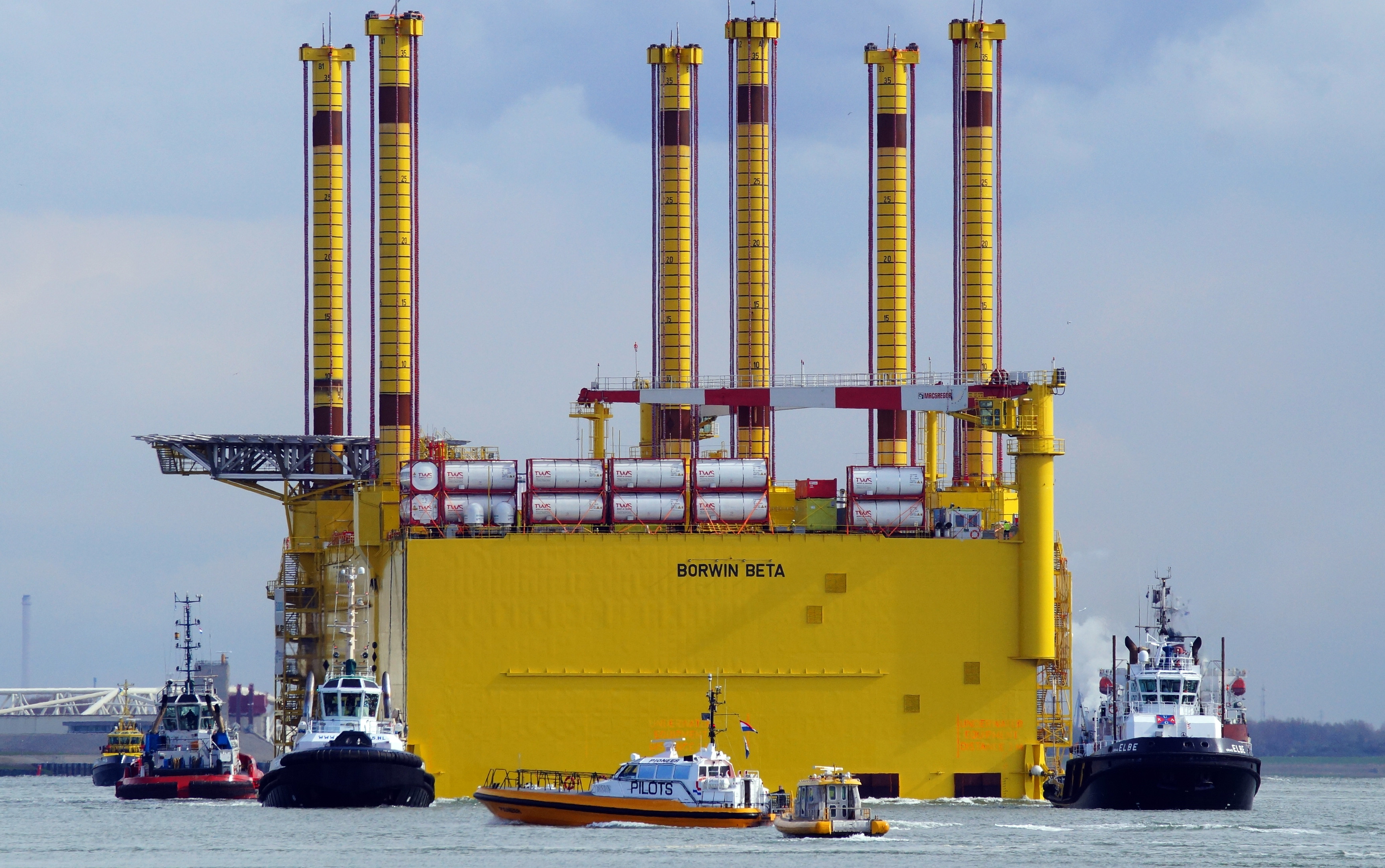
- The BorWin Beta platform being transported to site
- Map of HVDC BorWin2

Location
- Country: Germany
- From: BorWin Beta platform54°21′18″N 6°01′30″E
- Passes through: North Sea
- To: Diele 53°7′30″N 7°18′29″E

Construction information
- Cable manufacturer: Prysmian
- Substation manufacturer: Siemens
- Expected: 2015

Technical information
- Type: subsea+underground
- Current type: HVDC
- Total length: 200 km (120 mi)
- Capacity: 800 MW
- AC voltage: 380 kV (onshore side); 155 kV (offshore side)
- DC voltage: ±300 kV
- No. of poles: 1 (symmetrical monopole)

HVDC BorWin2 is a high voltage direct current (HVDC) link built to transmit offshore wind power to the power grid of the German mainland. The project differs from most HVDC systems in that one of the two converter stations is built on a platform in the sea. Voltage-Sourced Converters are used and the total cable length is 200 km. The project was completed by the Siemens/ Prysmian consortium and handed over to its owner, TenneT, in January 2015, becoming the first such project to be completed (the earlier HVDC BorWin1 project, despite having completed construction in 2009, was still not fully in service by that date).

== Context ==
BorWin2 is part of an ambitious programme of providing grid connections to offshore wind parks off the coast of Germany, in the German Bight, as part of the German Energiewende (Energy Transition) programme. BorWin2 forms part of the BorWin cluster, named after the German island of Borkum. BorWin2 has been built to transport power from the 400 MW Veja Mate (using 6 MW Siemens gearless turbines) and Global Tech 1 wind parks.

HVDC has been chosen for most of the grid connections because the relatively long distance involved – both from the wind park to shore and from the shore to the nearest suitable connection point to the onshore grid - makes conventional alternating current transmission uneconomic.

== Technical aspects ==
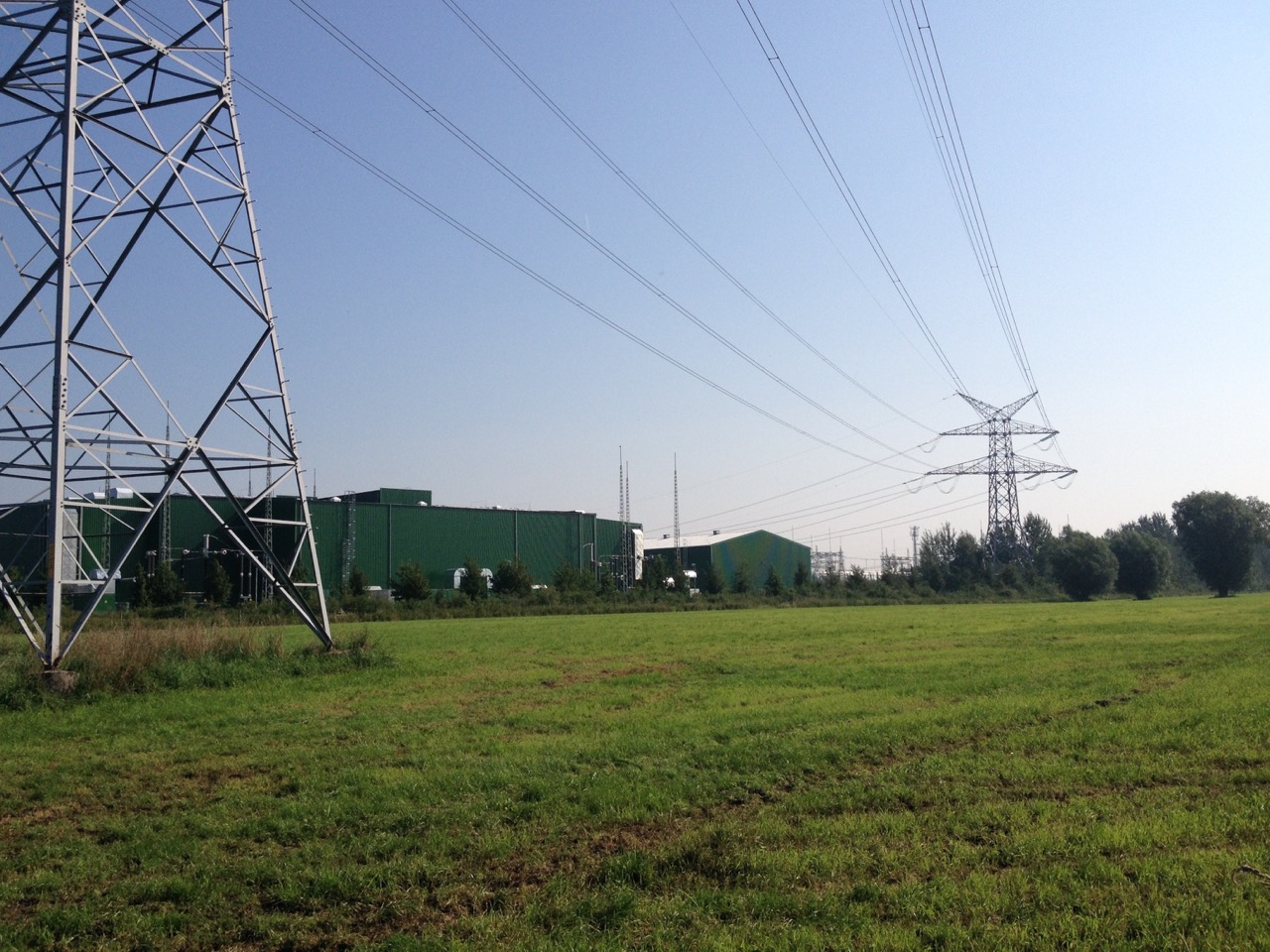
The land converter station at Diele.

BorWin2 uses Voltage Sourced Converters (VSC) to convert from AC to DC and back again, using 4.5 kV IGBTs as the switching elements. One converter is provided at each end of the link with a DC voltage of ±300 kV and a transmission capacity of 800 MW. The converters, built by Siemens, use the Modular Multi-Level Converter technology, in the symmetrical monopole configuration. Each converter station is equipped with two, three-phase transformers, each rated at 590 MVA (offshore) and 585 MVA (onshore). Each converter valve is equipped with a dry-type valve reactor of 50 mH.

The offshore converter is located on the BorWin Beta platform, which was built by Nordic Yards in Warnemünde. The topside of the platform is of the float-over type which is designed to be floated out to the installation site and then jacked up onto the submerged supporting structure using the support legs that are integral to the structure. The topside has a total weight of 12000 tonnes and measures 72.5 m x 51 m x 25 m high.

Each of the two 300 kV cables linking BorWin Beta to the onshore substation has a total length of 200 km, of which 125 km is sea cable and 75 km is underground land cable. The cables cross the small island of Norderney and, having reached the mainland, continue, as land cables, to the onshore converter station at Diele. The cables were supplied by Prysmian and use extruded Cross-linked polyethylene insulation.

== Construction schedule ==
The BorWin2 project was ordered in 2010. The platform was installed in April 2014. Commissioning was completed in November 2014 and the project was handed over in January 2015.

== Connected wind farms ==
- Veja Mate (402 MW)
- Deutsche Bucht (252 MW)
- Albatros (112 MW)

== See also ==
- High-voltage direct current
- Offshore wind power
- HVDC BorWin1
- HVDC BorWin3
- HVDC DolWin1
- HVDC DolWin2
- HVDC DolWin3
- HVDC HelWin1
- HVDC HelWin2
- HVDC SylWin1
