= HVDC HelWin2 =

Offshore HVDC connection in Germany

HelWin2
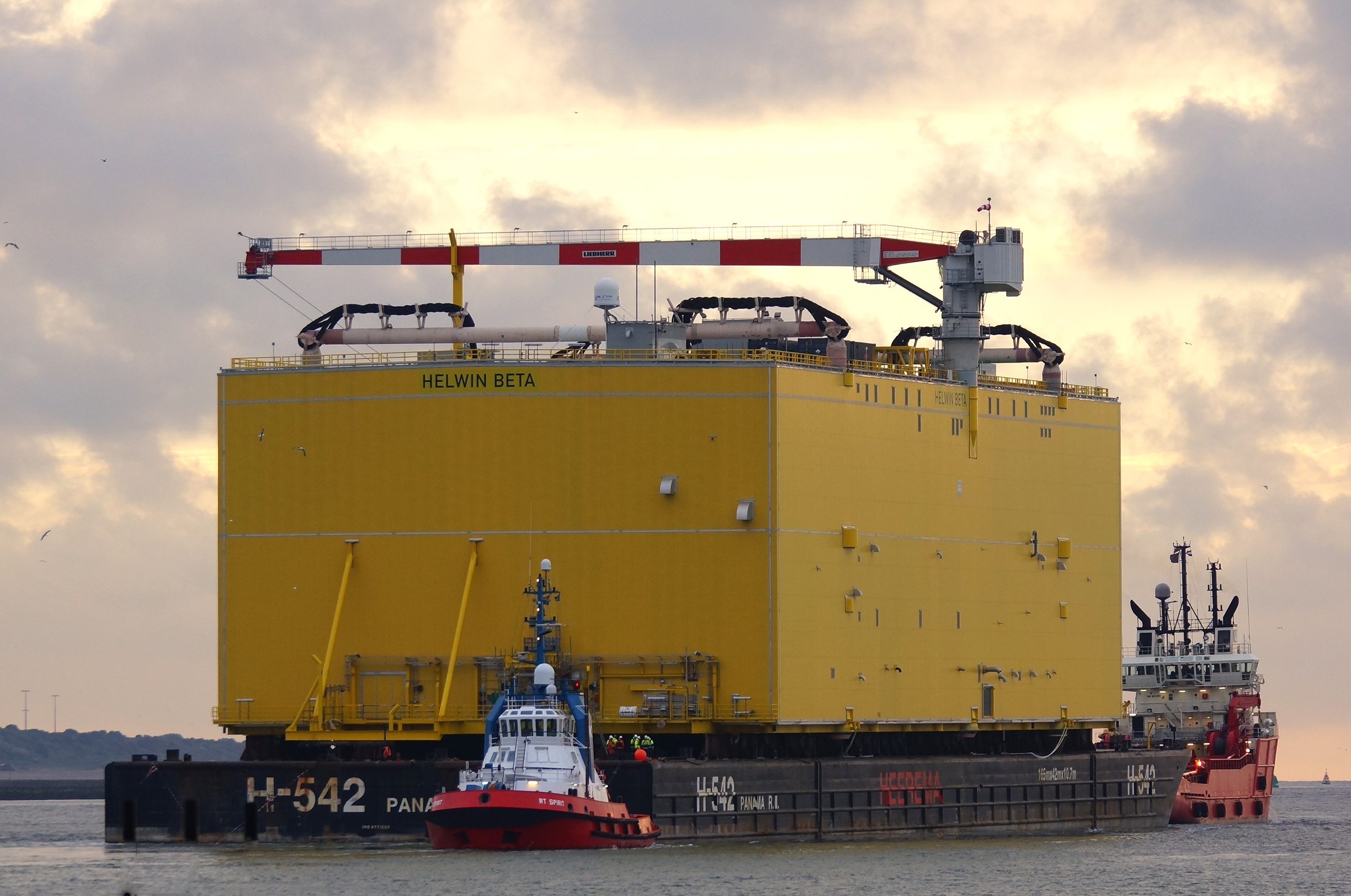
- The HelWin Beta platform topside.
- Map of HelWin2

Location
- Country: Germany
- From: HelWin Beta Offshore Converter Platform
- Passes through: North Sea
- To: Büttel Converter Station

Ownership information
- Owner: TenneT
- Operator: TenneT

Technical information
- Total length: 130 km (81 mi)
- Capacity: 690 MW
- DC voltage: 320 kV

HVDC HelWin2 is a high voltage direct current (HVDC) link built to transmit offshore wind power to the power grid of the German mainland. The project differs from most HVDC systems in that one of the two converter stations is built on a platform in the sea. Voltage-Sourced Converters with DC ratings of 690 MW, ±320 kV are used and the total cable length is 130 km. The project was built by the Siemens/Prysmian consortium with the offshore platform built by Heerema in Zwijndrecht, Netherlands. The topside measures 98 m x 42 m x 28 m and weighs 10200 tonnes. The project was handed over to its owner, TenneT, in June 2015, the fourth such project to be completed in 2015.

== Connected wind farms ==
- Amrumbank West (288 MW)
- Kaskasi (342 MW)

== See also ==
- High-voltage direct current
- Offshore wind power
- HVDC BorWin1
- HVDC BorWin2
- HVDC BorWin3
- HVDC DolWin1
- HVDC DolWin2
- HVDC DolWin3
- HVDC HelWin1
- HVDC SylWin1
