= Copenhagen Infrastructure Partners =

Investment firm specializing in infrastructure

- Type: Private company
- Industry: Financial services
- Founded: 2012; 14 years ago
- Headquarters: Copenhagen, Denmark
- Area served: Worldwide
- Key people: Jakob Baruël Poulsen, Christian T. Skakkebæk, Torsten Lodberg Smed, and Christina Grumstrup Sørensen
- Products: Investment funds
- Number of employees: 500+
- Website: www.cip.com

Copenhagen Infrastructure Partners P/S ("CIP") is a Danish investment firm specializing in infrastructure investments, particularly wind power. CIP is one of the world's largest dedicated renewables investment firms with €32 billion raised and a project pipeline of 120 GW.

== History ==
Founded in 2012, CIP is a dedicated fund manager within greenfield renewable energy investments and a global leader in offshore wind. The funds managed by CIP focus on investments in offshore- and onshore wind, solar PV, biomass and energy-from-waste, transmission and distribution, reserve capacity and storage, Power-to-X and advanced bioenergy. CIP has more than 500 employees and offices in Copenhagen, London, Hamburg, München, Utrecht, Luxembourg, Madrid, New York, Tokyo, Singapore, Seoul, and Melbourne.

CIP focuses its investments in greenfield energy infrastructure projects. By entering early, the company attempts to obtain exclusive access to some of the most attractive investment opportunities. De-risking and structuring the projects may create an attractive risk-adjusted return for investors alongside a significant positive impact on the local society and environment. CIP has a market-leading portfolio of green energy projects, totalling approximately 120 GW. CIP aims raising €100 billion by 2030 to be invested in green energy investments.

In March, 2025 CIP’s €12bn Fund V. All CIP’s funds seek to invest in renewable energy infrastructure projects which can assist in transitioning the global economy into a net-zero emissions scenario by 2050.

In September-November 2022, Danish business daily "Berlingske Business" published a series of articles about the past, present and future of CIP. In 2023, Ignitis and CIP won the tender in an auction to develop offshore wind farms in the Liivi 1 and Liivi 2 areas for Estonia in the Baltic Sea.

== Investment Funds ==
- Copenhagen Infrastructure I K/S - established in 2012 with a total commitment of EUR ~1bn by PensionDanmark
- Copenhagen Infrastructure II K/S - established in 2014 with a total commitment of EUR 2bn by 19 Danish and international institutional investors
- Copenhagen Infrastructure III K/S - established in 2018 with a total commitment of EUR 3.5bn (hard cap) exceeding the EUR 3bn target fund size
- Copenhagen Infrastructure IV K/S - established in 2020 with a total commitment of EUR 7bn (hard cap) exceeding the EUR 5.5bn target fund size
- Copenhagen Infrastructure V K/S - Launched in 2023 the fund reached a first close at EUR 5.6 billion in capital commitments received – putting it on track to reach its target fund size of EUR 12 billion and become the world’s largest dedicated greenfield renewable energy fund - CIP - Flagship funds
- Copenhagen Infrastructure New Markets Fund I K/S - established in November 2019 with a total commitment of USD 1.0bn exceeding the target fund size
- Copenhagen Infrastructure Growth Markets Fund II K/S – launched in December 2023 with a target size of USD 3bn and closed in August 2026 with approximately USD 3bn in commitments to the fund and associated vehicles, nearly triple the size of the first vintage; the fund invests in greenfield renewable energy infrastructure in 15 selected high-growth, middle-income markets across Asia, Latin America and EMEA, including India, Vietnam, the Philippines, Mexico and South Africa
- Copenhagen Infrastructure Energy Transition Fund I K/S - established in 2022 with a total commitment of EUR 3bn (hard cap).
- Copenhagen Infrastructure Advanced Bioenergy Fund I K/S - established in 2023 with a total commitment of EUR 750m
- Copenhagen Infrastructure Green Credit Fund I K/S - CIP's first debt fund. Established in 2023 with a total commitment of EUR 1bn reaching the target fund size.
- CI Artemis K/S - established in 2014 with a total commitment of EUR 392m
- CI Artemis II K/S - established in 2020 with a total commitment of approximately EUR 300m

CIP aims for EUR 100bn in renewable energy investments by 2030.

== Investors ==
CIP is a main investment firms for green energy and infrastructure projects. CIP has gone from having €1 billion under management for a single Danish investor in a single fund to having approximately €32 billion in eleven funds for more than 180 Danish and international institutional investors. PensionDanmark (a Danish pension fund) was a founding investor and remains is a major investor.

== Investments ==
Through its funds, CIP has wide range of investments in operation, construction and late-stage development. Examples are listed below:

- Høst - Denmark's first and one of Europe's biggest PtX facility for the production of green ammonia
- Veja Mate - an offshore wind farm with a capacity of 402 MW located in the German North Sea
- Monegros - 12 operational onshore wind farms in Aragon, Spain, with a total installed capacity of 487 MW
- Vineyard Wind - First U.S utility-scale offshore wind energy project. Generating clean energy for over 400,000 homes while reducing carbon emissions by over 1.6 million tons per year
- Fighting Jays - a 350 MW large-scale solar farm located approximately 70 kilometers from Houston's downtown area, powering about 530.000 households
- Misae - CIP’s first large-scale solar investment, a 240 MW project, capable of creating enough clean energy to power nearly 60,000 houses per year.
- Star of the South - An offshore wind project located in Australia with a capacity of 2.2 GW and capable of powering around 1.2 million homes
- 5 GW of solar and battery in Australia
- Changfang and Xidao (CFXD) - The CFXD Offshore Wind Project is a 589 MW capacity project located off the western coast of Changhua, Taiwan
- Mulilo – a South African renewable energy developer and independent power producer acquired by CI New Markets Fund I in 2023, with wind, solar PV and battery storage projects under the country's public procurement programmes and for corporate off-takers; the fund's first investment in South Africa

== Controversies ==
=== Biogas Greenwashing ===
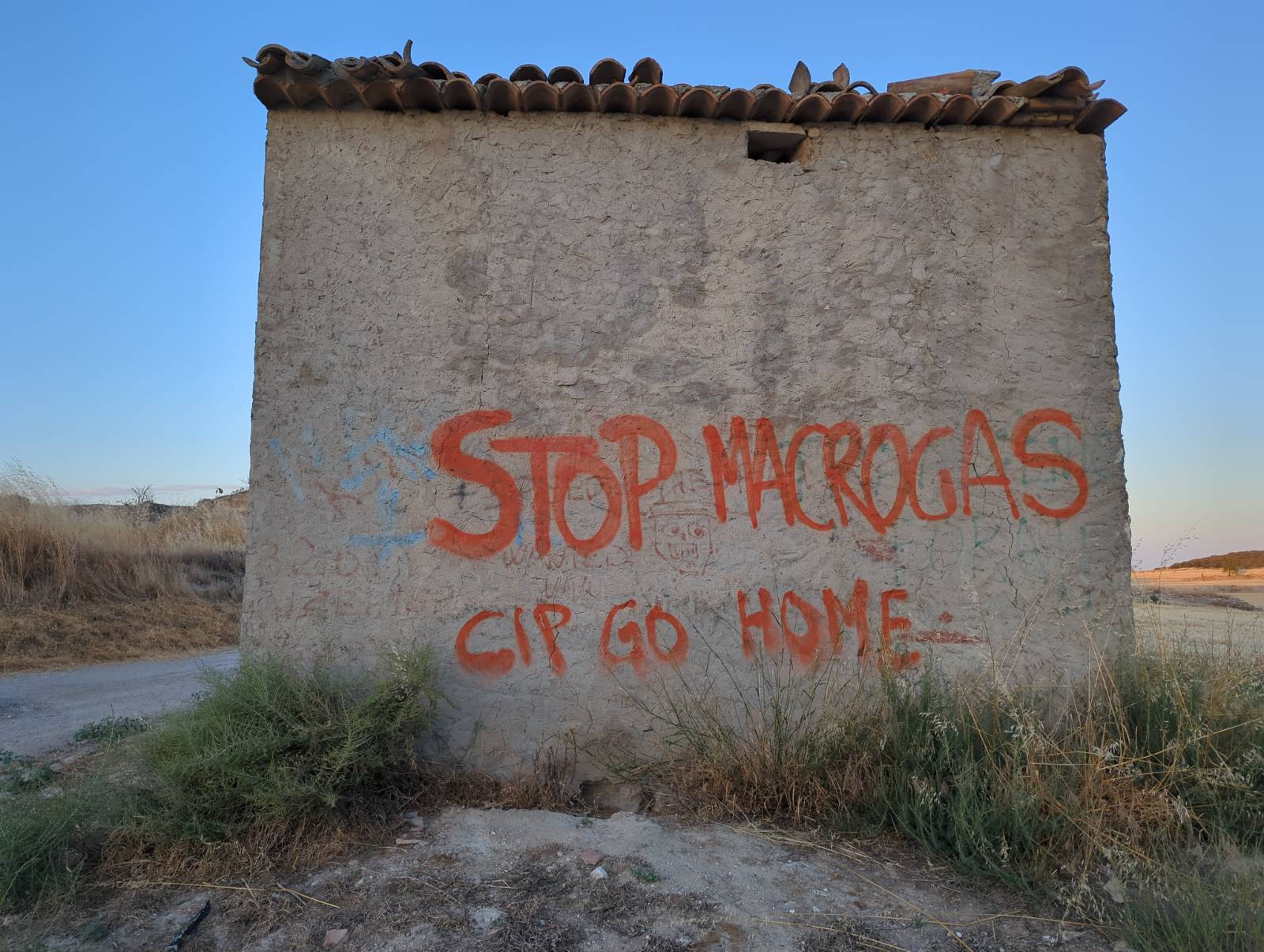
Graffiti in Bellmunt Serra stating "CIP go home" against the deployment of biogas in the region by Copenhagen Infrastructure Partners.

The renowned physicist Antonio Turiel as well as grassroots movements, have held several times that while small biogas facilities can aid reducing carbon footprint, the same does not happen when dealing with big infrastructure, as the energy for producing, importing and transporting the raw materials (dead animals, etc) to the place where the biogas plant is located is purposefully not taken into account in order to maximize its purported net emission savings.

The controversy comes especially regarding the 227 GWh/year biogas plant that CIP pretends to build in La Sentiu, which, if built, would be the biggest one in Europe, as of 2025. The plant would treat 480.000 tones of organic waste of different kinds. Several grassroots movements and mayors issued a letter to CIP and the catalan government, expressing the need for an open debate of the project while stating its excessive size makes it non sustainable, arguing that the materials travel long distances before reaching the gas holder, that it destroys fertile soil and that it does not

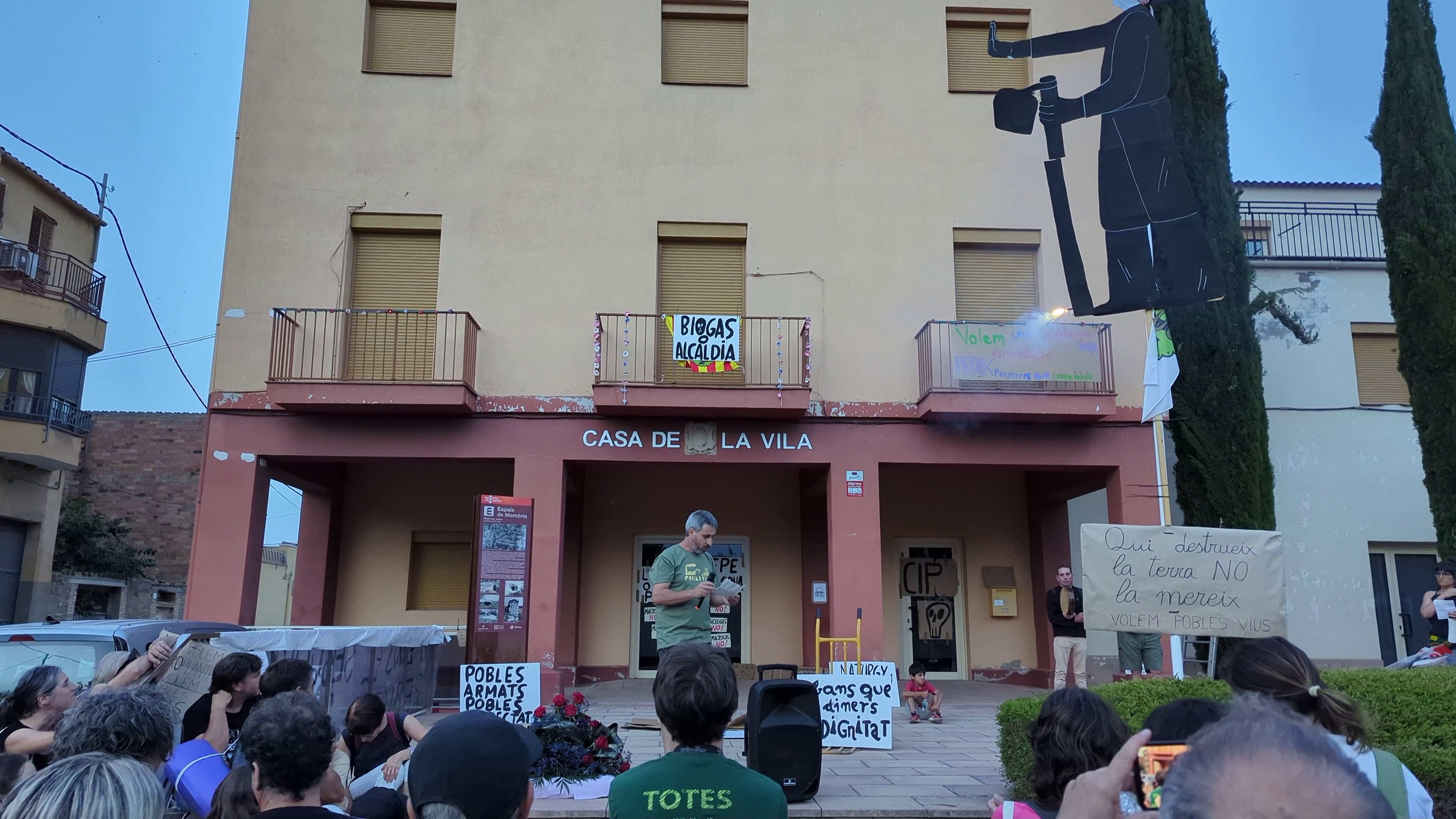
Demonstration in La Sentiu de Sió against the plant that the investor fund CIP.

meet local demands.
