= BARD Offshore 1 =

German offshore wind farm in the North Sea

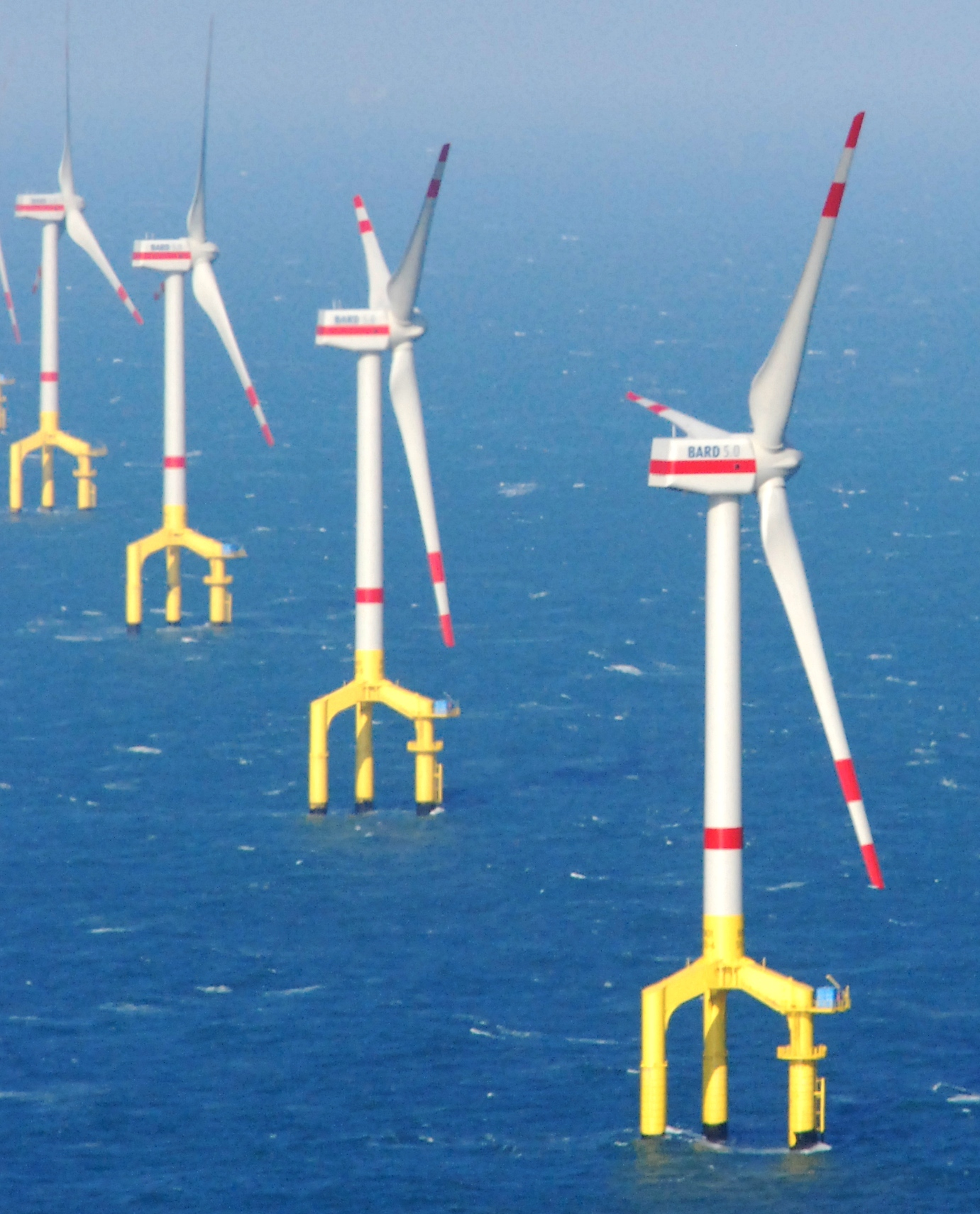
- Country: Germany
- Coordinates: 54°21′30″N 5°58′30″E
- Status: Operational
- Commission date: 2010

Wind farm
- Type: Offshore
- Hub height: 90 m (300 ft)
- Rotor diameter: 122 m (400 ft)

Power generation
- Units operational: 80 × 5 MW
- Make and model: BARD 5.0 (80)
- Nameplate capacity: 400 MW

External links
- Website: www.bard-offshore.de/en/projects/offshore/bard-offshore-1
- Commons: Related media on Commons

Wind farm layout

BARD Offshore 1's location in the wind farms of the German Bight

BARD Offshore 1 is a 400 megawatt (MW) North Sea offshore wind farm with 80 BARD 5.0 turbines. Since the owner could not buy such 5MW offshore wind turbines in sufficient numbers in 2006, Dr. Bekker set up its own production of turbines. This should serve as the legacy for his children. The systems were developed by aerodyn Energiesysteme GmbH. A plant for rotor blades and nacelle assembly was built in Emden and a plant for the offshore foundations in Cuxhaven. Two turbine prototypes were set up at the Rysumer Nacken in 2007, and another prototype in Hooksiel in 2008. Construction was finished in July 2013 and the wind farm was officially inaugurated in August 2013. The wind farm is located 100 kilometres (60 mi) northwest of the isle Borkum in 40-metre (130 ft) deep water.

Laying of cables to connect the wind farm started on 23 July 2009. The 200 km connection is the longest of its kind in the world. It is also the first connection of an offshore wind park realized as HVDC-transmission. Construction of the wind turbines began in March 2010. The first turbine became operational at the beginning of December 2010. Construction was assisted by the purpose-built Wind Lift 1 barge / platform, which placed the 470 ton, 21 meter foundations on the sea bed.

The project has run into serious and unclear problems, including being three years behind schedule and, at a cost of €3 billion, run significantly over budget. A diver and a worker died during construction. The farm was supposed to go online in August 2013, but a series of setbacks, including a fire at a transmission station in March 2014, have delayed its activation. BARD went bankrupt in November 2013. Problems include overvoltage and harmonics between BARD and the BorWin 1 grid link and BorWin Alpha HVDC converter platform.

BARD's original owner had decided to make all components within the company, and troubles from the custom transformer are unrelated to standard equipment used elsewhere.

As of January 2015, most of the turbines were not supplying power to shore, costing ratepayers €2million per day.

In September 2015, StatKraft and Ocean Breeze extended their contract for two years.

By May 2016, the company website stated that the wind farm had produced 3 terawatt-hours (11 PJ), and was running stably at full capacity.

Availability increased from 66% in 2014 to 95% by 2017. The feed-in tariff is €150/MWh to €190/MWh until 2024. Macquarie Infrastructure and Real Assets purchased the facility in 2019.

== See also ==
- Wind power in Germany
- List of offshore wind farms
- Borkum Riffgat
