= Büttel =

- Municipality
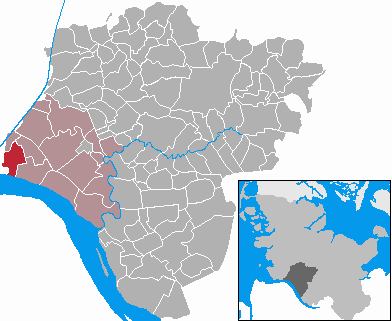
- Location of Büttel within Steinburg district
- Interactive map of Büttel
- Location within Germany Location within Schleswig-Holstein
- Coordinates: 53°54′1″N 9°13′38″E
- Country: Germany
- State: Schleswig-Holstein
- District: Steinburg
- Municipal assoc.: Wilstermarsch

Government
  - Mayor: Romain Weckel

Area
  - Total: 11.08 km^{2} (4.28 sq mi)
- Elevation: 1 m (3.3 ft)

Population (2025-12-31)
  - Total: 26
  - Density: 2.3/km^{2} (6.1/sq mi)
- Time zone: UTC+01:00 (CET)
  - Summer (DST): UTC+02:00 (CEST)
- Postal codes: 25572
- Dialling codes: 04858
- Vehicle registration: IZ
- Website: www.wilstermarsch.de

Büttel (German pronunciation: [ˈbʏtl̩]) is a municipality in the district of Steinburg, in Schleswig-Holstein, Germany.
