= Veja Mate Offshore Wind Farm =

German offshore wind farm in the North Sea

Veja Mate
- Veja Mate among the wind farms of the German Bight
- Official name: Veja Mate Offshore Wind Farm
- Country: Germany
- Location: North Sea
- Coordinates: 54°N 6°E
- Status: Operational
- Construction began: April 4, 2016
- Commission date: 31 May 2017
- Construction cost: 1,900 M€
- Owners: Commerz Real; KGAL; Skyborn Renewables; INGKA Holding; Siemens Financial Services

Wind farm
- Type: Offshore
- Max. water depth: 41 m
- Distance from shore: 95 km
- Hub height: 103 m
- Rotor diameter: 154 m (505 ft)
- Rated wind speed: 4–25 m/s
- Site area: 51 km^{2}

Power generation
- Units operational: 67 × 6 MW
- Make and model: Siemens Gamesa SWT-6.0-154 (67)
- Nameplate capacity: 402 MW
- Capacity factor: 45.4% (projected)
- Annual net output: 1,600 GW·h

External links
- Website: www.vejamate.net

Wind farm layout

Veja Mate is a German 402 MW offshore wind farm in the German Bight of the North Sea about 95 km northwest of Borkum. The wind farm consists of 67 Siemens Wind Power SWT-6.0-154 turbines, each with a 6 MW capacity.

In January 2017, 18 months after the financial close, the first of the turbines started delivering power to the German grid. The last turbine was installed on 25 May 2017, and commissioning activities were completed on 31 May 2017. Construction was completed in less than 23 months after financial close, almost four months ahead of the schedule agreed at financial close.

The EUR 1.9 billion (US$2.1bn) wind farm is owned by Siemens Financial Services and a consortium of European investors.

The power is delivered via the offshore converter station HVDC BorWin2 to the German onshore Diele substation near Weener.

== See also ==
- Wind power in Germany
- List of offshore wind farms
