= HVDC Hellsjön–Grängesberg =

HVDC transmission line in Sweden

The HVDC Hellsjön–Grängesberg is a test range from ABB between Hellsjön and Grängesberg to the testing of new components for HVDC. It consists of a 10 kilometer long overhead line, which was originally used as three-phase alternating current line and which is occasionally used for DC transmissions. The maximum transmission rate of the HVDC Hellsjön–Grängesberg is 3 megawatt, the operating voltage 10 kV (symmetrical against earth). When it was first built in 1893, it was the first Swedish power station to make use of the three-phase electric power system which had been invented only a few years earlier by the Swedish inventor Jonas Wenström.

== Sites ==
Site	Coordinates
Hellsjoen Static Inverter Plant	60°02′50″N 15°08′52″E
Graengesberg Static Inverter Plant	60°03′53″N 14°59′39″E

== Waypoints ==
List of waypoints
- 60.0638366°N 14.995104°E
- 60.0637242°N 15.0062459°E
- 60.0631727°N 15.0126189°E
- 60.063079°N 15.0203275°E
- 60.0630067°N 15.0313514°E
- 60.0588221°N 15.055148°E
- 60.0547575°N 15.0720244°E
- 60.0535954°N 15.0920713°E
- 60.0475134°N 15.14041°E
- 60.0475107°N 15.1474964°E
