= Antonio Turiel =

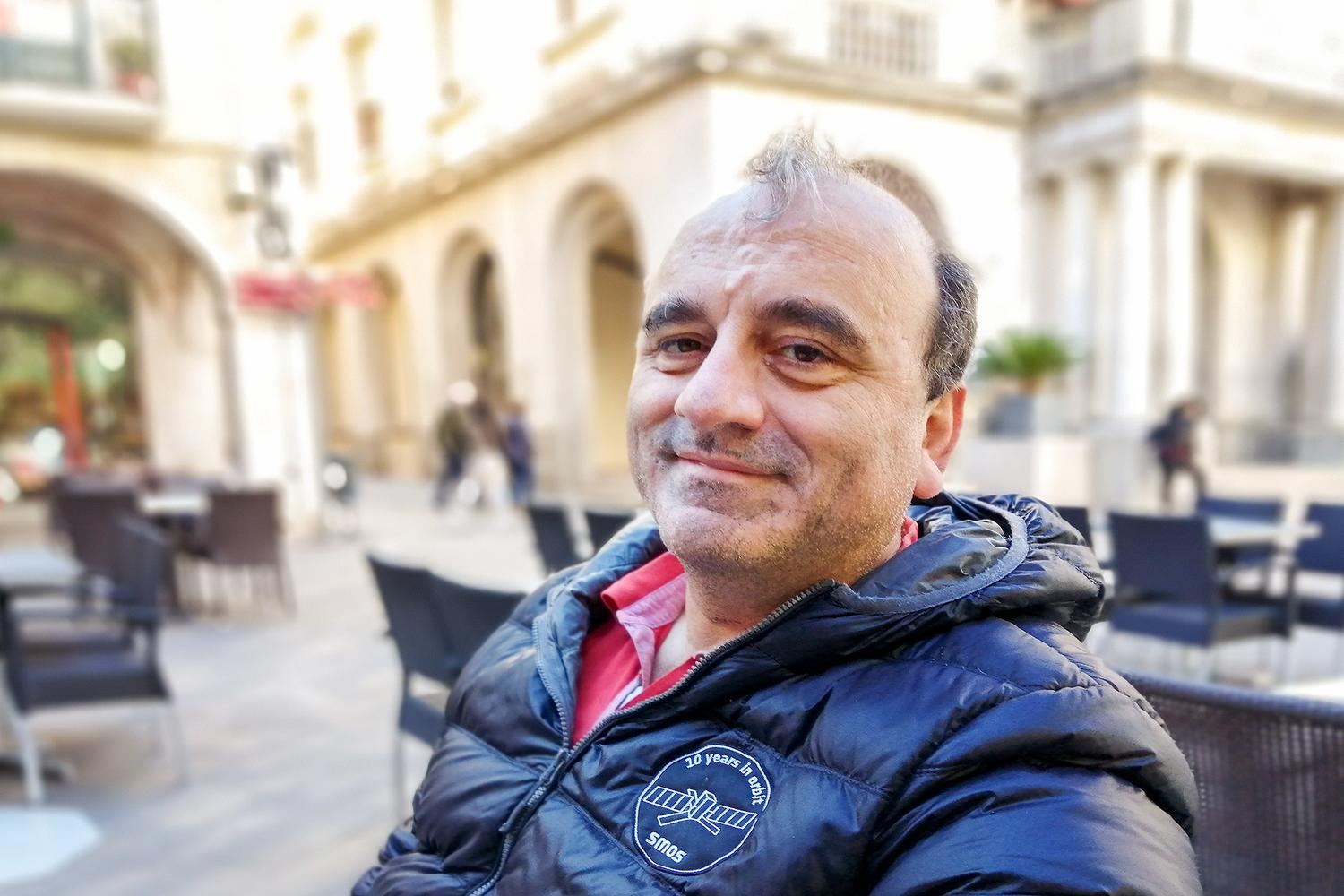
- Born: 1970 (age 55–56); León
- Education: Physics, Mathematics
- Alma mater: Universidad Autónoma de Madrid
- Occupation: Scientist
- Notable work: Petrocalipsis

Antonio Turiel Martínez (born in León, 1970) is a scientist and teacher of Physics and Math. He has a doctorate in Theoretical Physics from the Universidad Autónoma de Madrid. He works with the Instituto de Ciencias del Mar at CSIC, located in Barcelona.

== Career ==
Turiel is known for his work of a science communicator, scientific publications and presentations, and his blog The Oil Crash. The blog explores themes of resource depletion, especially around fossil fuels, and he was an early advocate for examining the impacts of Peak oil on society, and on both a global scale and in Spanish speaking economies.

Turiel argues for degrowth arguing for the "reduction of the metabolism of Society" and considers this inevitable. He is critical of the role of the Productivism in both leftist and right wing politics. He argued that its impossible to maintain a capitalist economy and facilitate an Energy transition because of the inherient limitations of renewable energy Turiel argues that the "idea of infinite growth" would lead to the collapse of humanity in the 21st century.

In the context of political economy, Turiel argues that the energy transition is difficult considering the current way of life, and such a transition implies a substantial decrease in material intensity and primary energy, which is politically unpopular.

About renewable energy, Turiel reflects that the limits of production and the likelihood that a fossil fuel crises will create a material shortage, necessarily limiting the production of renewables.

He has testified in front of several governments: to the Energy Commission of the Basque Parlement on 29 September 2018, the Quinta Commission of the Colombian Congress over banning fracking on 12 February 2021 and the Commission for the Energy Transition in the Spanish Senate on 12 April 2021.

Turiel interpreted the Invasion of Ukraine in February 2022 as a responded to energy and mineral problems by Russia, and the difficulty of the energy transition in that contest.

== Publications ==
=== Books ===
- 2013 — Un futuro sin más, Antonio Turiel, Kindle Edition. Novela de ficción especulativa.
- 2020 — Petrocalipsis, Antonio Turiel, 2020, Editorial Alfabeto, ISBN 978-84-17951-10-8. Ensayo divulgativo sobre la crisis energética.
- 2022 — El otoño de la civilización, Juan Bordera y Antonio Turiel (Prólogo de Yayo Herrero. Epílogo de Jorge Riechmann), Editorial Escritos Contextatarios, ISBN 978-84-09-38126-5.
- 2022 — Sin energía, Antonio Turiel, 2022, Editorial Alfabeto, ISBN 978-84-17951-32-0.
- 2024 — El futuro de Europa. Cómo decrecer para una reindustrialización urgente, Antonio Turiel, 2024, Ediciones Destino, ISBN 978-84-233-6641-5.
