= HVDC BorWin1 =

Offshore HVDC connection in Germany

- Location of HVDC BorWin1

Location
- Country: Germany
- Coordinates: 54°21′15″N 6°01′30″E; 53°7′31″N 7°18′33″E
- General direction: north–south
- From: Platform BorWin Alpha
- Passes through: North Sea
- To: Diele substation

Ownership information
- Operator: TenneT

Construction information
- Cable manufacturer: ABB
- Substation manufacturer: ABB
- Construction started: 2007
- Commissioned: 2009

Technical information
- Type: submarine cable, subsoil cable
- Current type: HVDC
- Total length: 200 km (120 mi)
- Capacity: 400 MW
- AC voltage: 170 kV (Platform BorWin Alpha), 380 kV (Diele)
- DC voltage: ±150 kV
- No. of circuits: 1

BorWin Alpha's location in the wind farms of the German Bight

HVDC BorWin1 is the first HVDC facility in the world to be built for importing power from an offshore wind park to shore, and the first to use voltage source converters (VSC) in Germany. It connects the offshore wind park BARD Offshore 1 and other offshore wind farms in Germany near Borkum to the European power grid. The facility was built by ABB and has a capacity of 400 MW at a bipolar voltage of ±150 kV. HVDC BorWin1, which leads from BorWin Alpha Offshore Platform to Diele substation, consists of a 75 kilometres (47 mi) of underground and 125 kilometres (78 mi) of submarine cable.

Unlike the later (and more powerful) HVDC connections that have been built for transmitting wind power to shore in Germany, Borwin 1 uses cascaded two-level converter submodules, i.e., a modular multilevel converter (MMC) scheme with a large step size, in which each half-bridge submodule contains several IGBTs connected in series for the required submodule voltage rating. Pulse-width modulation (PWM) is used to improve the level of harmonics but filtering is still needed. One converter is provided at each end of the link, in the symmetrical monopole configuration.

Borwin 1 is operated by the German Transmission System Operator TenneT (formerly Transpower Stromübertragungs GmbH). and construction and commissioning were completed in 2009, although the project has had many technical difficulties since that date. In March 2014 a fire on the platform caused the scheme to be shut down for several months.

== Sites ==
Site	Coordinates
Diele Static Inverter Plant	53°7′31″N 7°18′33″E
Borkum 2 platform	54°21′15″N 6°01′30″E

== BorWin Alpha ==
BorWin Alpha is the first HVDC converter station in the world to be installed on an offshore platform. It is located in the wind power farms of the German Bight in the North Sea.

BorWin Alpha converts the power generated in offshore wind park BARD 1 into direct current at a voltage of 150 kV for HVDC-transmission to Diele. Operating as static inverter valves, the station BorWin alpha uses not thyristors, but IGBT elements.

BorWin alpha was built in a shipyard in Vlissingen, Netherlands with electrical equipment from ABB. The equipment was dragged with the SSCV Thialf to the place of assembly and installed at the end of May and the beginning of June 2009. The overall height of BorWin alpha is 84 metres, from which 62 metres come from the carrying construction, the so-called Jacket. The weight of the entire platform is 5000 tons. Of this 1800 tons come from the Jacket.
