= HVDC converter station =

Type of substation

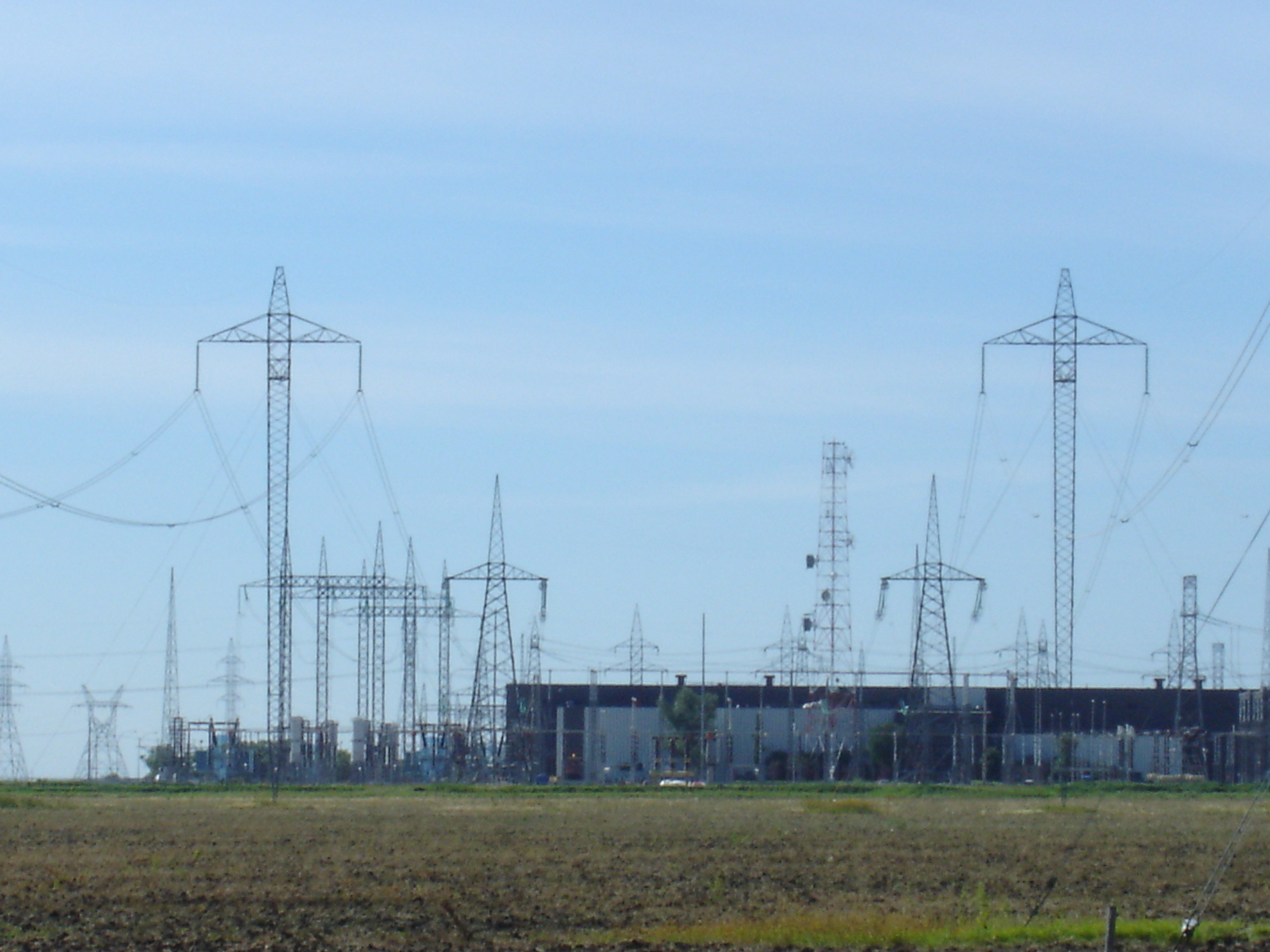
Dorsey Station in Manitoba, Canada

An HVDC converter station (or simply converter station) is a specialised type of substation which forms the terminal equipment for a high-voltage direct current (HVDC) transmission line. It converts direct current to alternating current or the reverse. In addition to the converter, the station usually contains:

- three-phase alternating current switch gear
- transformers
- capacitors or synchronous condensers for reactive power
- filters for harmonic suppression, and
- direct current switch gear.

== Components ==
=== Converter ===
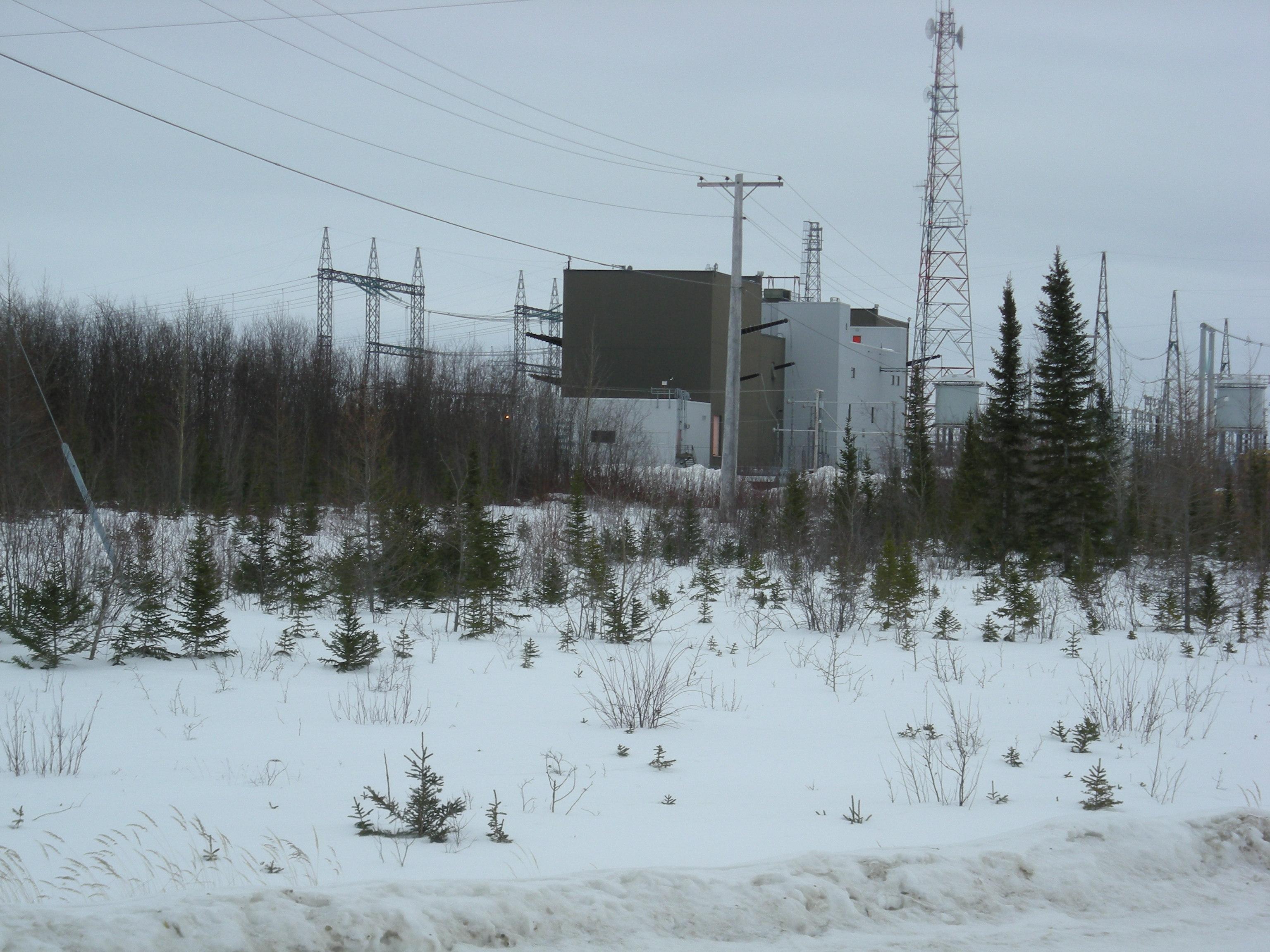
Valve hall at Henday converter station, part of the Nelson River DC Transmission System in Canada

The converter is usually installed in a building called the valve hall. Early HVDC systems used mercury-arc valves, but since the mid-1970s, solid state devices such as thyristors have been used. Converters using thyristors or mercury-arc valves are known as line commutated converters. In thyristor-based converters, many thyristors are connected in series to form a thyristor valve, and each converter normally consists of six or twelve thyristor valves. The thyristor valves are usually grouped in pairs or groups of four and can stand on insulators on the floor or hang from insulators from the ceiling.

Line commutated converters require voltage from the AC network for commutation, but since the late 1990s, voltage sourced converters have started to be used for HVDC. Voltage sourced converters use insulated-gate bipolar transistors instead of thyristors, and these can provide power to a deenergized AC system.

Almost all converters used for HVDC are intrinsically able to operate with power conversion in either direction. Power conversion from AC to DC is called rectification and conversion from DC to AC is called inversion.

=== DC equipment ===
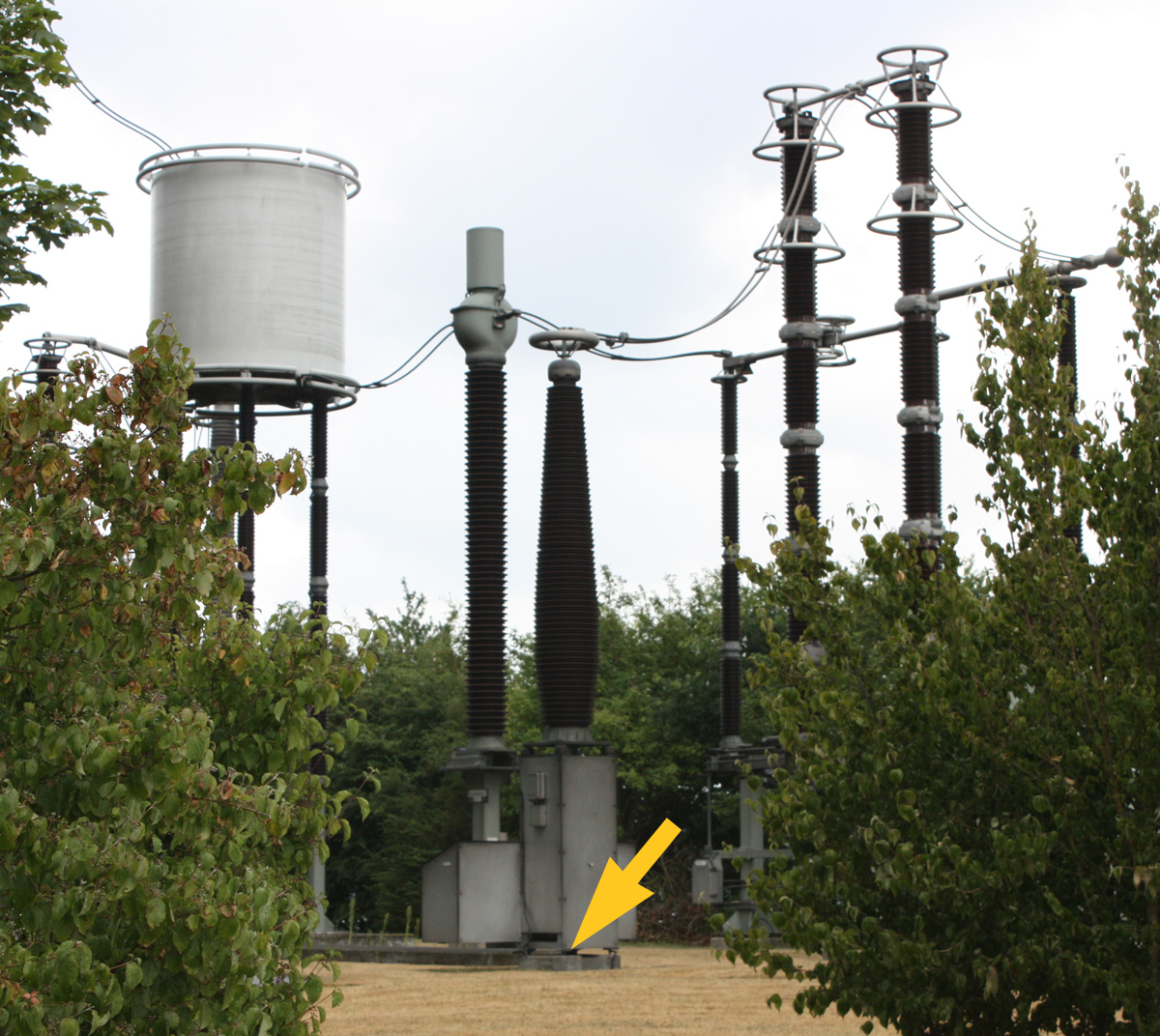
HVDC cable termination and DC smoothing reactor on the Baltic Cable HVDC link

The direct current equipment often includes a coil (called a reactor) that adds inductance in series with the DC line to help smooth the direct current. The inductance typically amounts to between 0.1 H and 1 H. The smoothing reactor can have either an air-core or an iron-core. Iron-core coils look like oil-filled high voltage transformers. Air-core smoothing coils resemble, but are considerably larger than, carrier frequency choke coils in high voltage transmission lines and are supported by insulators. Air coils have the advantage of generating less acoustical noise than iron-core coils, they eliminate the potential environmental hazard of spilled oil, and they do not saturate under transient high current fault conditions. This part of the plant will also contain instruments for measurement of direct current and voltage.

Special direct current filters are used to eliminate high frequency interference. Such filters are required if the transmission line will use power-line communication techniques for communication and control, or if the overhead line will run through populated areas. These filters can be passive LC filters or active filters, consisting of an amplifier coupled through transformers and protection capacitors, which gives a signal out of phase to the interference signal on the line, thereby cancelling it. Such a system was used on the Baltic Cable HVDC project.

=== Converter transformer ===
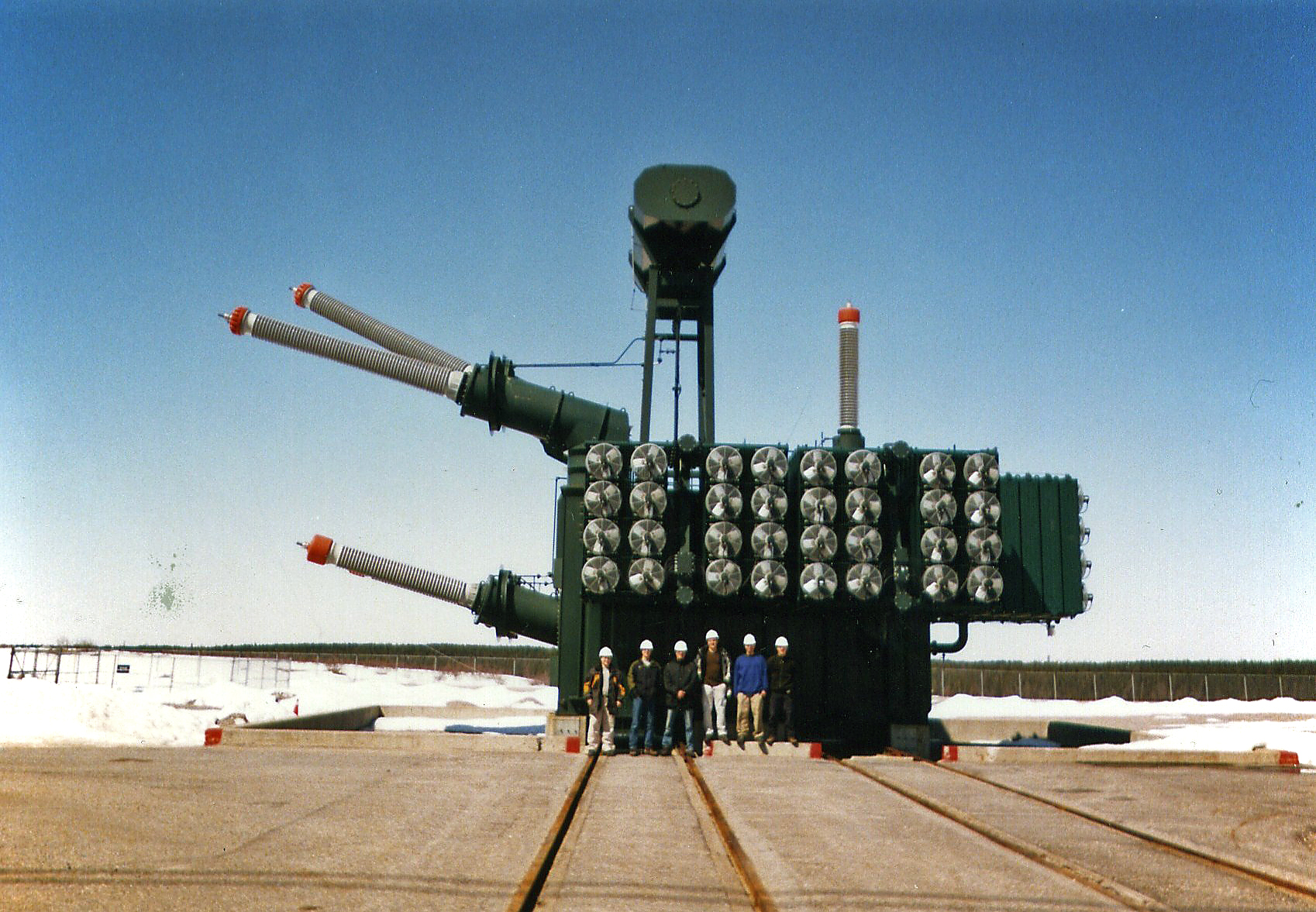
A single-phase, three-winding converter transformer

The converter transformers step up the voltage of the AC supply network. Using a star-to-delta or "wye-delta" connection of the transformer windings, the converter can operate with 12 pulses for each cycle in the AC supply, which eliminates numerous harmonic current components. The insulation of the transformer windings must be specially designed to withstand a large DC potential to earth. Converter transformers can be built as large as 300 Mega volt amperes (MVA) as a single unit. It is impractical to transport larger transformers, so when larger ratings are required, several individual transformers are connected together. Either two three-phase units or three single-phase units can be used. With the latter variant only one type of transformer is used, making the supply of a spare transformer more economical.

Converter transformers operate with high flux Power Steps In the Four Steps of the Converter per cycle, and so produce more acoustic noise than normal three-phase power transformers. This effect should be considered in the siting of an HVDC converter station. Noise-reducing enclosures may be applied.

=== Reactive power ===
When line commutated converters are used, the converter station will require between 40% and 60% of its power rating as reactive power. This can be provided by banks of switched capacitors or by synchronous condensers, or if a suitable power generating station is located close to the static inverter plant, the generators in the power station. The demand for reactive power can be reduced if the converter transformers have on-load tap changers with a sufficient range of taps for AC voltage control. Some of the reactive power requirement can be supplied in the harmonic filter components.

Voltage sourced converters can generate or absorb reactive as well as real power, and additional reactive power equipment is generally not needed.

=== Harmonic filters ===
Harmonic filters are necessary for the elimination of the harmonic waves and for the production of the reactive power at line commutated converter stations. At plants with six pulse line commutated converters, complex harmonic filters are necessary because there are odd numbered harmonics of the orders 6n + 1 and 6n - 1 produced on the AC side and even harmonics of order 6n on the DC side. At 12 pulse converter stations, only harmonic voltages or currents of the order 12n + 1 and 12n - 1 (on the AC side) or 12n (on the DC side) result. Filters are tuned to the expected harmonic frequencies and consist of series combinations of capacitors and inductors.

Voltage sourced converters generally produce lower intensity harmonics than line commutated converters. As a result, harmonic filters are generally smaller or may be omitted altogether.

Beside the harmonic filters, equipment is also provided to eliminate spurious signals in the frequency range of power-line carrier equipment in the range of 30 kHz to 500 kHz. These filters are usually near the alternating current terminal of the static inverter transformer. They consist of a coil which passes the load current, with a parallel capacitor to form a resonant circuit.

In special cases, it may be possible to use exclusively machines for generating the reactive power. This is realized at the terminal of HVDC Volgograd-Donbass situated on Volga Hydroelectric Station.

=== AC switchgear ===
The three-phase alternating current switch gear of a converter station is similar to that of an AC substation. It will contain circuit breakers for overcurrent protection of the converter transformers, isolating switches, grounding switches, and instrument transformers for control, measurement and protection. The station will also have lightning arresters for protection of the AC equipment from lightning surges on the AC system.

== Others ==
=== Required area ===
The area required for a converter station is much larger than a conventional transformer, for example a site with a transmission rating of 600 megawatts and a transmission voltage of 400 kV is approximately 300 x 300 metres (1000 x 1000 feet). Lower-voltage plants may require somewhat less ground area, since less air space clearance would be required around outdoor high-voltage equipment.

=== Location factors ===
Converter stations produce acoustic noise. Converter stations can generate serious levels of radio-frequency interference, so include design features to control these emissions. Walls may provide noise protection. As with all AC substations, oil from equipment must be prevented from contaminating ground water in case of a spill. Substantial area may be required for overhead transmission lines, but can be reduced if underground cable is used.

== See also ==
- List of HVDC projects
- Rotary converter plant
- High-voltage transformer fire barriers
