= Nuclear power in the Netherlands =

Nuclear power plants in the Netherlands(view)
Active plants
Closed plants

The Netherlands' only commercial nuclear reactor is Borssele nuclear power plant, which became operational in 1973 and as of 2011 produces 485 MW and about 4% of the country's electricity.

The older Dodewaard nuclear power plant was a test reactor that was later attached to the national grid but was closed in 1997.

The Netherlands hosts two active research reactors, the 45 MW HFR in Petten, North Holland, and the 2 MW RID in Delft, part of the physics department of Delft University of Technology. Neither of these two are designed for energy provision, but are used as a neutron- and positron-source for research and medical isotope production. In 2025, nuclear power produced 3% of the country's electricity.

== History ==
=== Pre-2000s ===
Researchers in the Netherlands began studying nuclear energy in the 1930s and began the construction of research reactor at then Reactor Centrum Nederland (today Energy & Health Campus) in 1955. The researchers' goal was to introduce nuclear power technology by 1962 and reduce the need for fossil fuels.

Timeline of all nuclear reactors (power and non-power) built in the Netherlands (1955 - 2024)

In the 1970s, the Dutch chose a policy that required the reprocessing of all spent nuclear fuel. In 1984, the government decided to create a long-term (100 years) storage facility for all intermediate and low-level radioactive waste and research strategies for ultimate disposal. In September 2003, the Central Organization for Radioactive Waste created an interim storage facility for high-level waste.

In 1994, the Netherlands' parliament voted to phase out nuclear power after a discussion of nuclear waste management. In 1997, the power station at Dodewaard was shut down and the government planned to end Borssele's operating license in 2003. In 2003, with a new government in power, the shutdown was postponed to 2013. In 2006, the government decided that Borssele would remain open until 2034, if it complied with the highest safety standards. The owners, Essent and Delta, would invest 500 million euros in sustainable energy, together with the government's money, which, the government claims, should have otherwise been paid to the plant's owners as compensation. After the 2010 election, the new government was open to expanding nuclear power. Both of the companies that share ownership of Borssele are proposing to build new reactors.

=== Post-2000s ===
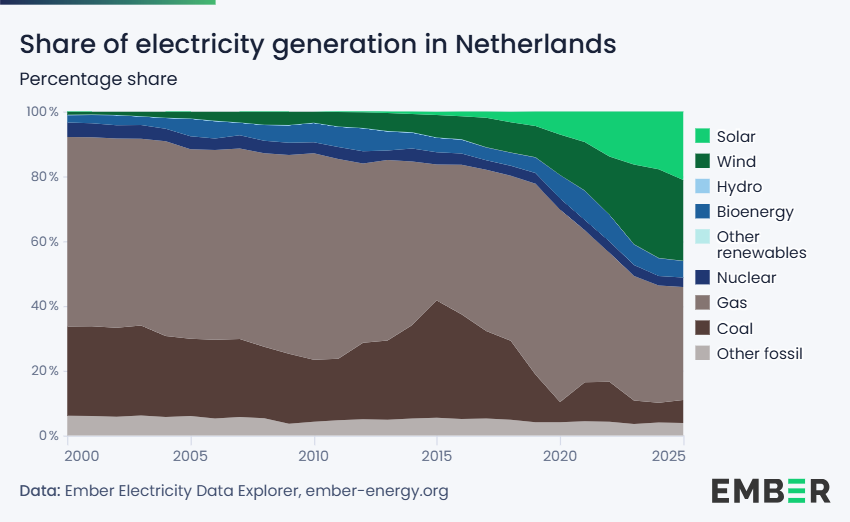
Netherlands electricity generation by source - Percentage share

In January 2012, Delta announced the postponing of any decision to start building a second nuclear power plant.

In November 2018, a majority of the Dutch parliament supported the construction of new nuclear power plants.

In November 2019, an opinion poll found that 61% of Dutch voters are in favor of the installation of new nuclear plants in the Netherlands, with a noticeable discrepancy between right- and left-wing voters.

In December 2021, the Fourth Rutte cabinet stated that it wants to prepare for the construction of two new nuclear power plants in order to reduce CO_{2} emissions and meet the European Union goals for tackling climate change. Part of this preparation is the launch of a feasibility study, looking at the advantages and disadvantages of the use of nuclear power to tackle climate change.

In December 2022, the Fourth Rutte cabinet designated the existing Borssele nuclear power plant site as the preferred location for two new reactors. It has also called for a feasibility study into extending the operation of the existing Borssele plant beyond 2033. The House of Representatives later urged the government to investigate the construction of two more reactors.

In 2023, the Dutch government announced a significant expansion of its nuclear energy program, proposing the construction of at least four large nuclear reactors by 2040, a substantial increase from the initial goal of two reactors. To support this, funding will be more than tripled from €4.5 billion to €14 billion. A tender process is slated to begin by mid-2025 to select technology for the first two large reactors, potentially involving major global suppliers such as EDF, Korea Hydro & Nuclear Power, and Westinghouse. Additionally, the existing Borssele nuclear power plant site has been designated for two of the new reactors, targeted for completion by 2035, and the plan includes considering additional nuclear stations, such as small modular reactors, to enhance the country's energy independence and sustainability.

In 2025, Minister of Environment Sophie Hermans announced that it was no longer feasible to choose the site for new nuclear that year, and it was unrealistic to have a reactor operational in 2035. She said many steps still had to be completed and a plan for those steps was not yet available.

== Reactors in the Netherlands ==
In total, 10 nuclear reactors (2 power generating and 8 non-power generating) of various sizes and uses have been built in the Netherlands.

Reactor Name	Location	Reactor Type	Power (Thermal)	Power (Electric)	Neutron Spectrum	Moderator	Construction Start	First Criticality	Final Shutdown	Decommissioning Completed
KSTR	Arnhem	Homogenous	100 kW	N/A	Thermal	Light Water	28/02/1963	22/05/1974	1977	1991
BARN	Wageningen	?	100 kW	N/A	Thermal	Light Water	?/05/1961	09/04/1963	01/02/1980	14/10/2009
HOR	Delft	Pool type research reactor	2 MW	N/A	Thermal	Light Water	?/11/1958	1963?	In Operation	N/A
KRITO	Petten	Zero power critical assembly	<100W	N/A	Thermal	Light Water	?	29/03/1963	19/04/1967	Converted into STEK
STEK	Petten	Zero power critical assembly	<100W	N/A	Fast-Thermal	Light Water + Graphite	19/04/1967	22/05/1969	?/?/1973	?
ATHENE	Eindhoven	Pool type research reactor	10 kW	N/A	Thermal	Light Water	08/06/1966	06/02/1969	?/?/1973	?
LFR	Petten	Argonaut	30 kW	N/A	Thermal	Light Water	?/12/1959	28/09/1960	?/12/2010	2013
HFR	Petten	Materials testing/research reactor	45 MW	N/A	Thermal	Light Water	28/08/1957	09/11/1961	In Operation	N/A
Dodewaard	Dodewaard	Boiling water reactor	?	60 MW	Thermal	Light Water	23/09/1963	26/03/1969	26/03/1997	Likely 2040
Borssele	Sloe, Zeeland	Pressurised water reactor	?	485 MW	Thermal	Light Water	02/07/1969	20/06/1973	In Operation - Likely 2033	N/A

== Domestic production and imports ==
Nuclear energy contributes about 10% of the electricity used in the Netherlands, primarily sourced from the Borssele nuclear power station. The plant produces approximately 4 billion kilowatt hours (kWh) of nuclear energy annually, providing enough electricity to power over 1 million homes. Additionally, the Netherlands supplements its domestic nuclear energy production by importing electricity from neighboring countries, notably France and Germany.

Nuclear energy Consumption 2011-2021 (EJ input-equivalent)
2011	2012	2013	2014	2015	2016	2017	2018	2019	2020	2021
0.04	0.04	0.03	0.04	0.04	0.04	0.03	0.03	0.04	0.04	0.03

== Nuclear policy ==
The Dutch nuclear sector is regulated by a comprehensive legal framework, prominently outlined in the Nuclear Energy Act (NEA). This framework law establishes basic rules for the use of nuclear technologies and materials and includes provisions for radiation protection. It designates competent authorities and defines their responsibilities. Supplementing the NEA are various orders in council, royal decrees, ministerial and ANVS (Authority for Nuclear Safety and Radiation Protection) regulations, as well as the Nuclear Safety Guidelines. These guidelines, which apply to nuclear installations and facilities, are based on IAEA Safety Standards and other relevant international codes and standards, which are integral to the licensing process for reactors.

== See also ==
- Energy in the Netherlands
- Electricity sector in the Netherlands
- Hydroelectricity in the Netherlands
- Solar power in the Netherlands
- Wind power in the Netherlands
