= List of power stations in the Netherlands =

The following page lists all power stations in the Netherlands.

Power station map

== Nuclear ==
Site	City	Coordinates	Type	MWe	Operator	Operational	Status
Borssele Nuclear Power Station	Borssele	51°25′55″N 3°43′00″E	PWR	485	EPZ	1974	Operational
Dodewaard nuclear power plant	Dodewaard	51°53′58″N 5°41′10″E	BWR	58	GKN	1963-1997	Decommissioned

== Fossil ==
=== Active power stations ===
Site (units)	City	Coordinates	Fuel	MWe	Operator	Operational
Bergum power station	Burgum	53°12′35″N 6°01′49″E	Natural gas	144	Engie Energie	2019
Sloe power station	Vlissingen	51°27′N 3°41′E	Natural gas	870	EP NL	2010
Eems power station	Eemshaven	53°26′06″N 6°52′42″E	Natural gas	1750	Electrabel	1996
Magnum power station	Eemshaven	53°27′N 6°51′E	Natural gas	1311	Vattenfall (NUON)	2013
Enecogen power station	Europoort	51°57′29″N 4°05′33″E	Natural gas	950	Eneco 50 % EPNL 50%	2011
Eemshaven power station	Eemshaven	53°26′N 6°52′E	Coal	1600	Essent	2014
Maasstroom power station	Rotterdam	51°53′24″N 4°21′07″E	Natural gas	425	EP NL	2010
Rijnmond power station	Rotterdam	51°53′24″N 4°21′18″E	Natural gas	800	EP NL	2006
Maxima power station	Lelystad	52°34′41″N 5°31′48″E	Natural gas	880	Electrabel	2010
Claus power station	Maasbracht	51°09′14″N 5°54′25″E	Natural gas	1304	Essent	2012
Moerdijk power station	Moerdijk	51°41′06″N 4°34′49″E	Natural gas	418	Essent	2012
Swentibold power station	Geleen	50°58′19″N 5°47′27″E	Natural gas	231	Essent	1999
Maasvlakte power station (Riverstone Holdings)	Rotterdam	51.943944°N 4.071733°E	Coal	731	Riverstone Energy	2015
Maasvlakte power station (MPP3)	Rotterdam	51°57′29″N 4°01′30″E	Coal	1070	Uniper	2016
Amer power station	Geertruidenberg	51°42′34″N 4°50′36″E	Biomass	600	Essent	2023
Hemweg power station (HW9)	Amsterdam	52°24′19″N 4°50′42″E	Natural gas	440	Vattenfall (NUON)	2012
Diemen power station	Diemen	52°20′19″N 5°01′15″E	Natural gas	684	Vattenfall (NUON)	1995/2013
ELSTA power station	Terneuzen	51°19′59″N 3°46′41″E	Natural gas	460	Vattenfall (NUON)	1998
IJmond	IJmuiden		Blast furnace gas	144	Vattenfall (NUON)	1997
Lage Weide power station	Utrecht		Natural gas	266	Eneco	1995

=== Closed power stations ===
Site (units)	City	Coordinates	Fuel	MWe	Operator	Operational
Borssele coal power station (BS12)	Borssele	51°25′55″N 3°43′00″E	Coal	426	EPZ	1988 (closed in 2015)
Gelderland power station (CG13)	Nijmegen	51°51′20″N 5°49′50″E	Coal/biomass	602	Electrabel	1982 (closed in 2016)
Maasvlakte power station (MV1 and MV2)	Rotterdam	51°57′29″N 4°01′30″E	Coal/biomass	1040	E.ON	1988 (closed in 2017)
Hemweg power station (HW8)	Amsterdam	52°24′19″N 4°50′42″E	Coal	630	Vattenfall (NUON)	1995 (closed in December 2019)

== Megawatt electric (MWe) ==
It is the electric output of a power plant in megawatt. The electric output of a power plant is equal to the thermal overall power multiplied by the efficiency of the plant. The power plant efficiency of light water reactors amounts to 33 to 35% compared to up to 40% for modern coal-, oil- or gas-fired power plants.

== See also ==
- List of power stations in Europe
- List of largest power stations in the world
