= Hydroelectricity in the Netherlands =

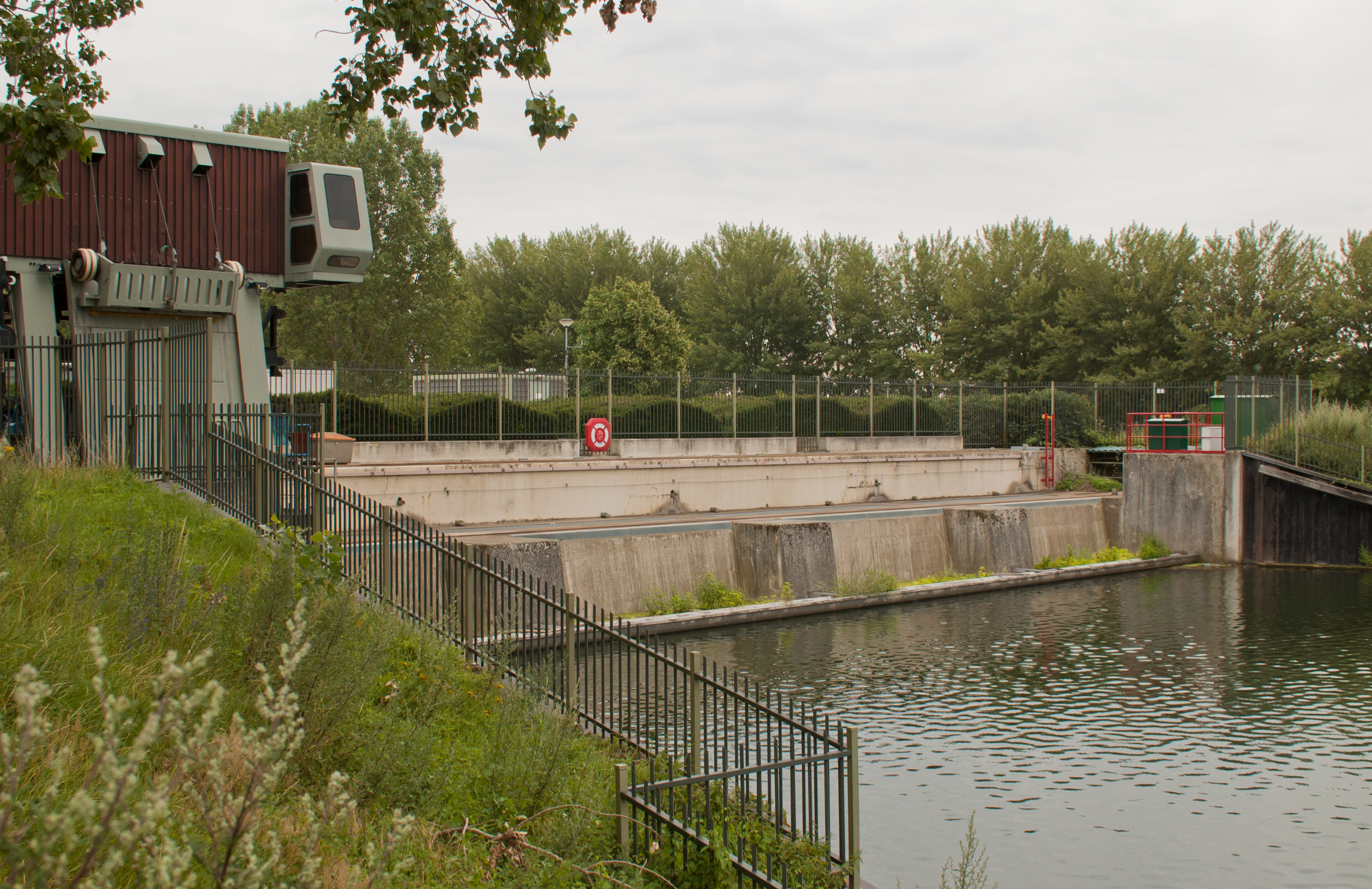
Linne hydroelectric power plant

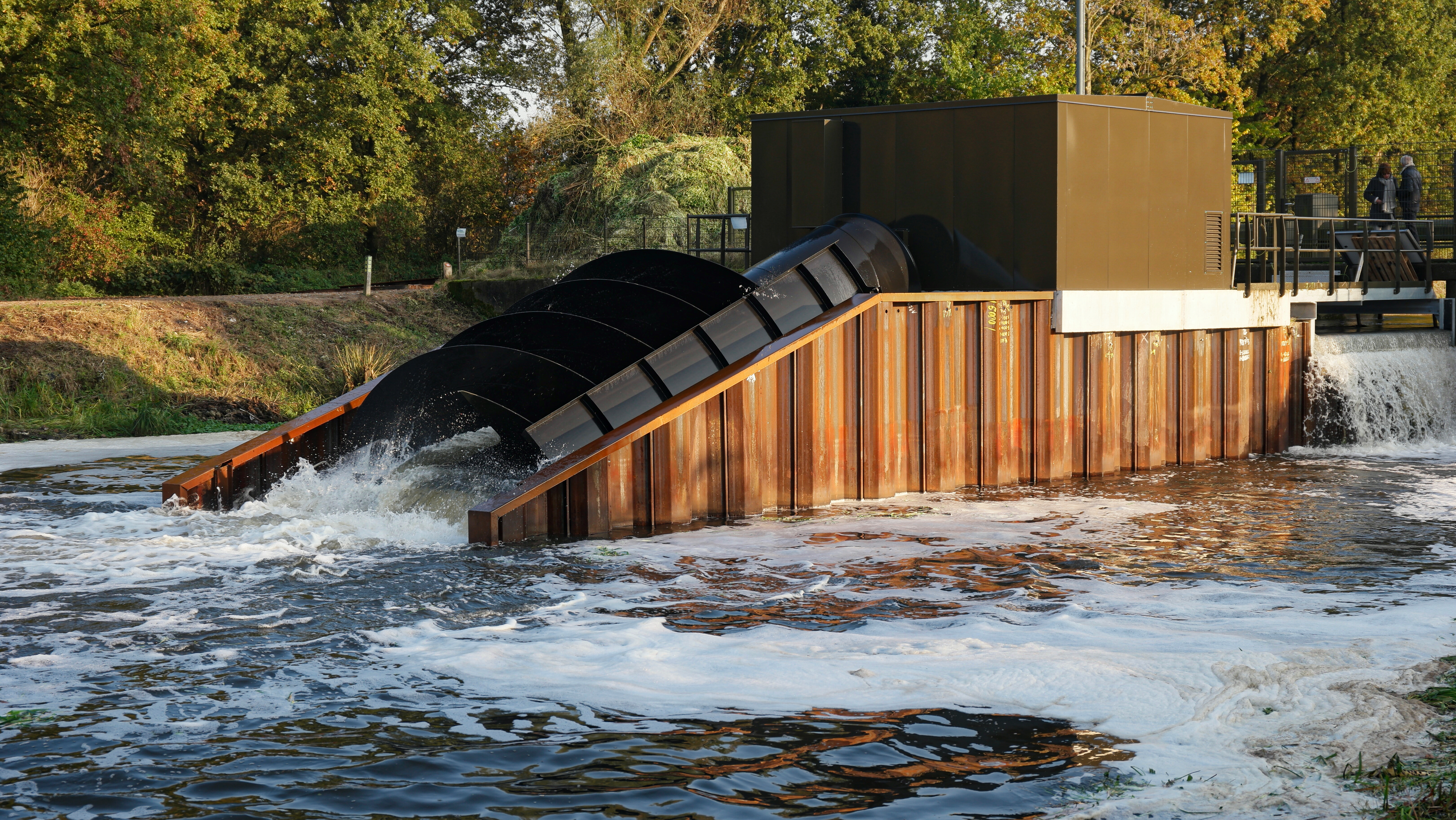
Dommelstroom hydroelectric power plant

Despite its long interaction with water, the Netherlands has little potential for hydropower due to its flat topography. The Netherlands has a large resource of moving water in its major rivers, but its limited hydraulic head because of little elevation change means that hydropower is a minor component of the country's renewable energy portfolio. A few small hydro plants exist but in total produce less than one tenth of one percent (<0.1%) of the Netherlands' electricity.

Owner	River	Location	Nominal power [MW]	In service	Location
NUON	Meuse (Dutch: Maas)	Alphen	14	1990	51.8111°N 5.4536°E
Essent	Meuse (Dutch: Maas)	Linne	11	1989	51.1672°N 5.9229°E
NUON	Rhine (Dutch: Rijn)	Amerongen	10	1988	51.9737°N 5.4086°E
NUON	Lek	Hagestein	1.8	1958	51.9912°N 5.1335°E
Rijkswaterstaat	Wilhelmina Canal	Tilburg	0.3	2020	51.5817°N 5.0334°E
NUON	Roer	Roermond	0.2	2000	51.1896°N 5.9812°E
Dommelstroom	Dommel	Sint-Michielsgestel	0.1	2016	51.6328°N 5.3539°E
Essent	Vecht	Gramsbergen	0.1	1988	52.6214°N 6.6951°E

Location map

== See also ==
- Electricity sector in the Netherlands
- Energy in the Netherlands
- Wind power in the Netherlands
- Solar power in the Netherlands
- Renewable energy in the Netherlands
