= EPZ =

EPZ may refer to:

- Elektriciteits Produktiemaatschappij Zuid-Nederland, an operator of coal and nuclear power plants
- Emergency Planning Zone, a zone (amongst a number of zones) defined around a nuclear power plant or other extremely high-safety installation defined in order to facilitate evacuation and other emergency measures in case of an incident with off-site contamination
- Equipotential zone, an area of equal potential to protect workers on electrical equipment from electric shock
- Export processing zone, a specific class of special economic zone
