= Vandebron =

Utility company in the Netherlands

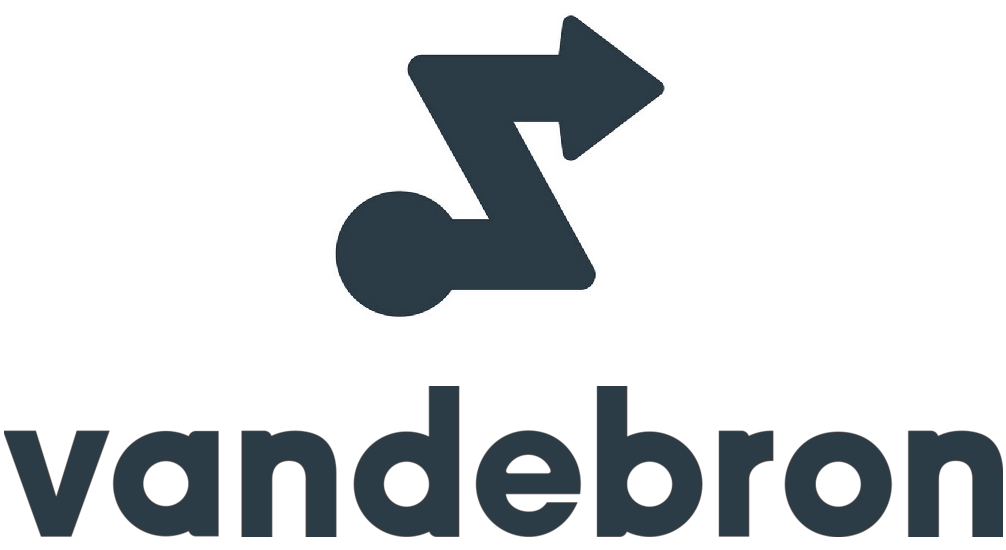
- Industry: Utility
- Founded: 2013; 13 years ago
- Founders: Remco Wilcke, Matthijs Guichelaar, Aart van Veller
- Headquarters: Amsterdam (North Holland), Netherlands
- Area served: Netherlands
- Key people: Matthijs Guichelaar, Remco Wilcke, Aart van Veller
- Products: Green electricity Natural gas
- Number of employees: 120+
- Website: vandebron.nl

Vandebron is a green energy company based in Amsterdam, Netherlands that delivers green electricity and regular gas to individual and business customers. The company does not produce any energy itself, but instead sells energy generated by independent energy producers. The electricity is generated from wind, solar and biomass, and most of the producers are located on farms or are larger wind parks.

Energy producers set their own prices, and customers of Vandebron choose which producer they wish to be supplied by. Vandebron also supplies natural gas, which is CO_{_{2}} compensated. Customers also choose which compensation project they wish to support with their gas usage, from a selection of six compensation projects throughout the developing world.

== History ==
Vandebron was set up in late 2013 as a private limited company (BV) in the Netherlands; its founders were Remco Wilcke, Matthijs Guichelaar and Aart van Veller. The supply of energy began in April 2014. In early 2019, the company delivered energy to more than 180,000 households. These households receive sustainable energy from over 200 local sources.

=== Action closure Central Hemweg ===
After the elections of 15 March 2017, the parties VVD, CDA, D66 and GroenLinks came to the negotiating table to discuss closing all remaining coal-fired power stations in the Netherlands. This measure, which is expensive for VVD and CDA, was necessary, according to GroenLinks and D66, to achieve the Paris climate agreements. At the end of March 2017, Vandebron offered to buy the Amsterdam coal-fired power station Hemweg-8 for 1 million euros in order to close it, with Vandebron taking care of the decommissioning. The municipality of Amsterdam and Tony's Chocolonely also wanted to contribute a million each. Nuon director Alexander van Ofwegen responded on 27 March that a total of 50 to 55 million is needed: 40 million for a severance package for employees and another 10 to 15 million for the dismantling of the power station. On 7 April 2017 Vandebron, Triodos Bank, DOEN Foundation and others started the crowdfunding campaign "We want #Hemweg". The total amount saved was now 5 million. Greenpeace and the citizens' initiative Hot Coal joined the action.

== See also ==
- Electricity sector in the Netherlands
- Renewable energy in the Netherlands
