= Electricity sector in the Netherlands =

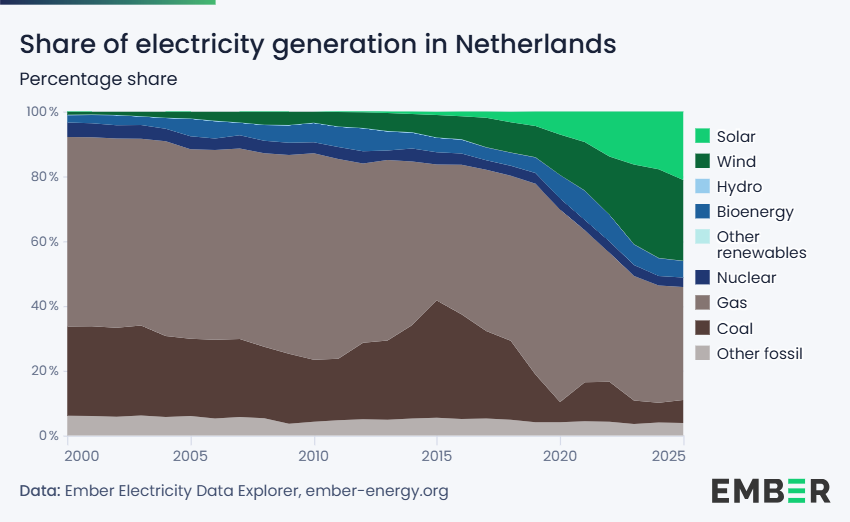
Netherlands electricity generation by source

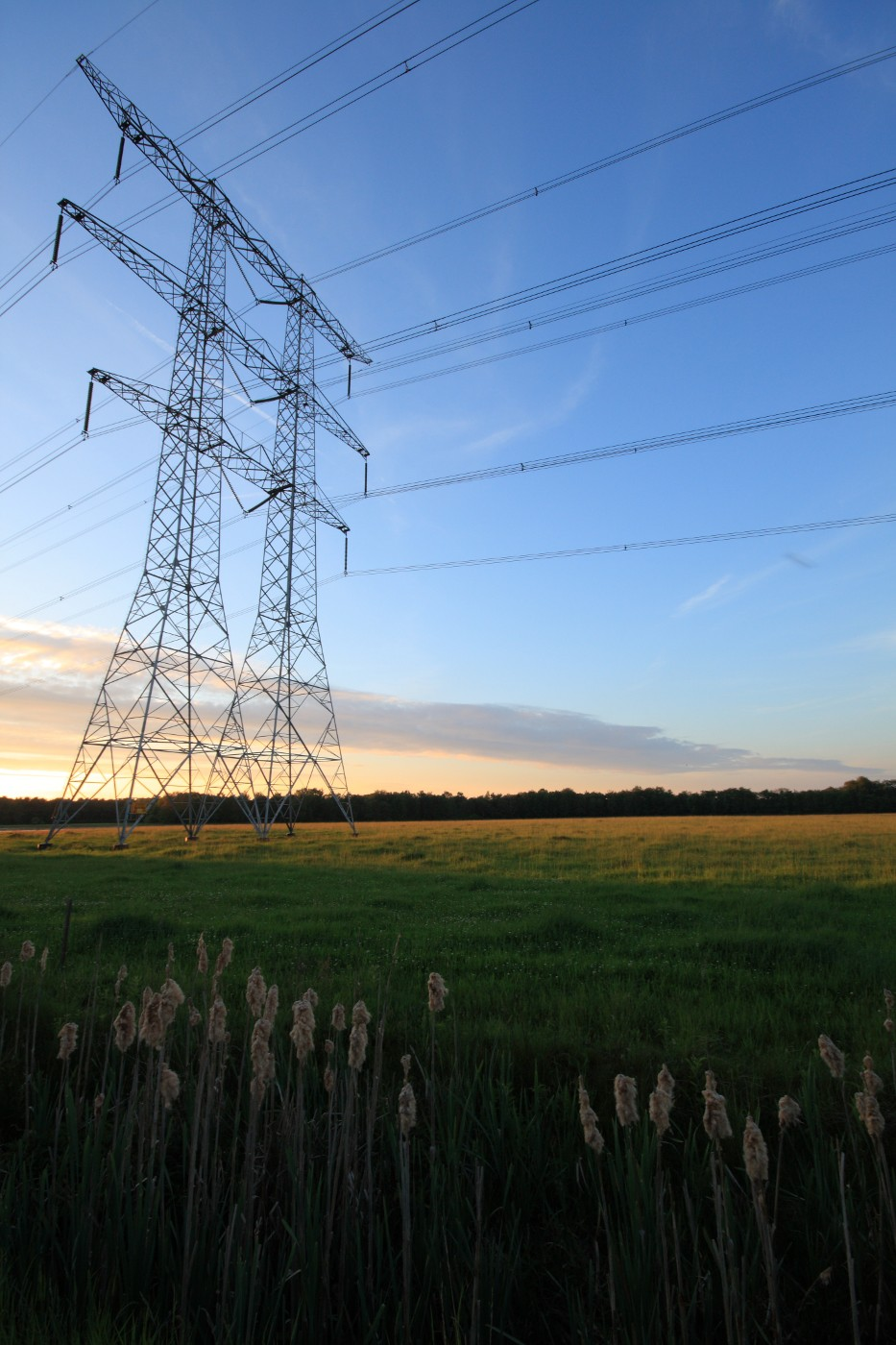
Three-circuit 380 kV double pylon of the Geertruidenberg–Eindhoven power line; west of Vloeiveldweg, Tilburg

The total electricity consumption of the Netherlands in 2021 was 117 terawatt-hours (TWh). The consumption grew from 7 TWh in 1950 by an average of 4.5% per year. In 2021, fossil fuels, such as natural gas and coal, accounted for around 62% of the total electricity produced. Renewable energy sources, such as biomass, wind power, and solar power, produce 38% of the total electricity. One nuclear plant in Borssele is responsible for around 3% of total generation. More than 75% of electricity is produced centrally by thermal and nuclear units.

From 2005 to 2008, the Netherlands imported 13-15% of its electricity. After 2008, however, the share of electricity imported decreased drastically, meaning that in 2009, the Netherlands became a net exporter of electricity. That was until 2011, when the electricity import balance increased sharply. This development continued in 2012 and 2013. A 2010 amount of 56.1 PJ almost doubled in 2015 to 110.7. The cause of the increase in electricity imports was contributed to the development of energy prices. The price of natural gas rose in 2011 and 2012, while the price of coal rose in 2011, but fell in 2012 and 2013. Additionally, the supply of cheap electricity in neighbouring countries rose relatively strongly, which made imports more attractive.

Before 1998, utility companies were allowed to own an electricity network and sell electricity simultaneously, which gave companies that owned the network unfair advantages over companies that were only active in retail sales of electricity. This prompted a restructuring of the electricity sector in the Netherlands with the introduction of the Electricity Act in 1998. This act demanded the decoupling of utilities and electricity supply. The generation and retail of electricity in the Netherlands were liberalized. However, transmission and distribution are still centralized and operated by the system operator and utilities. The system operator and utilities have a monopoly position in the energy market. Therefore, these parties have to be regulated to guarantee rights of consumers and businesses in the electricity sector. The Authority for Consumers and Markets was founded in 2013.

The system operator, TenneT, is the only stakeholder responsible for managing the high-voltage grid (between 110 kV and 380 kV) in the Netherlands. Six utility companies own the regional energy grids: Coteq Netbeheer, Enexis, Liander, Stedin Netbeheer, RENDO, and Westland Infra Netbeheer.

== Electricity by power source ==
Electricity supply and consumption in the Netherlands (GWh)
Year	Consumption	Net Production	Fossil	Nuclear	Biomass	Wind	Solar	Other	Import-Export	Losses
1980	59626	62068	-	-	-	-	-	-	−307	2135
1985	63096	60581	-	-	-	-	-	-	5127	2612
1990	75544	69403	-	-	-	-	-	-	9206	3065
1995	85661	77746	-	-	-	-	-	-	11391	3476
2000	100602	85768	-	-	-	-	-	-	18916	4082
2005	110301	96484	-	-	-	-	-	-	18295	4478
2010	112681	114369	-	-	-	-	-	-	2776	4464
2015	109236	105752	87476	3862	4339	7550	1109	1417	8748	5264
2016	110538	111057	91882	3750	4296	8170	1602	1357	4915	5434
2017	111548	113456	91908	3223	3993	10569	2204	1559	3506	5414
2018	113477	110841	88754	3333	3906	10549	3708	592	7970	5334
2019	113658	117862	91620	3700	5067	11508	5399	567	855	5059
2020	112434	119838	83730	3865	7891	15278	8567	507	−2660	4744
2021	113375	117919	74942	3618	9817	17679	11304	559	253	4797
2022	108139	117274	66285	3930	8733	21017	16657	599	−4267	4869
2023	107142	117830	58061	3767	6771	29035	19607	519	−5659	5028
2024	111297	120228	55516	3382	5929	32839	21822	654	−4221	4710
2025	113021	131767	63016	3802	6664	32037	25520	671	−14048	4697

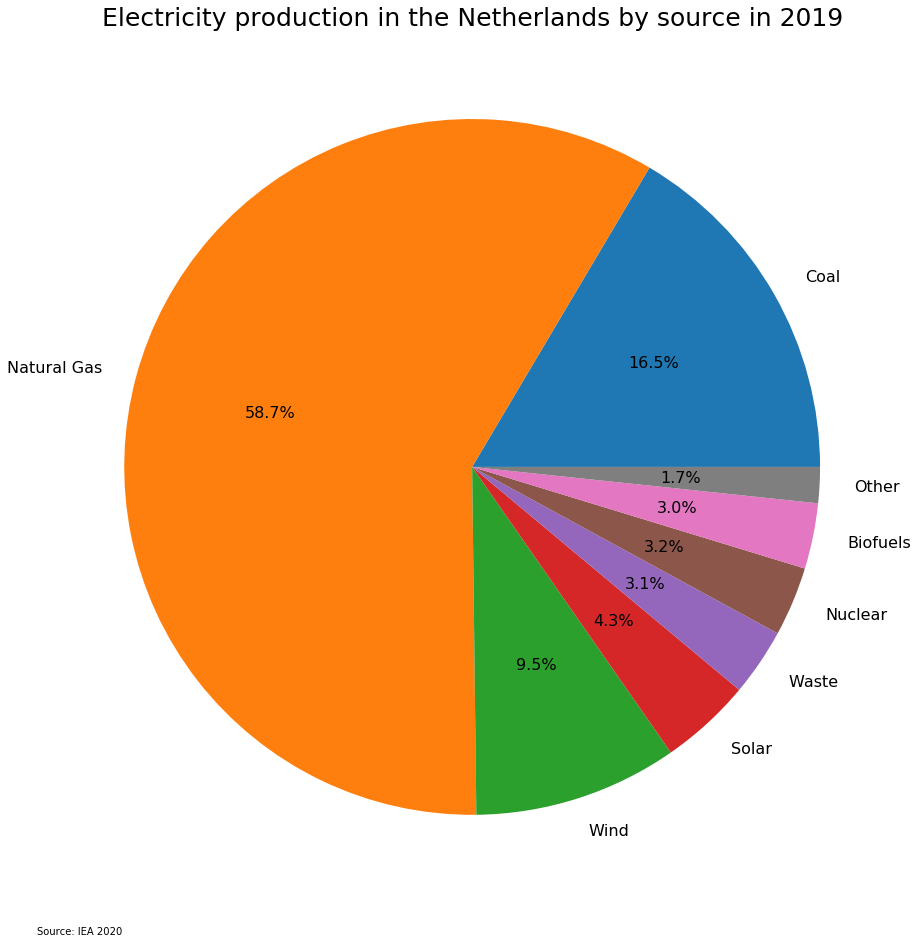
Dutch electricity by source in 2019

In 2008, the Netherlands consumed an average of 7463 kWh per person, equal to the EU15 average of 7409 kWh per person. In 2014, this was 6713 kWh per person, which is a decrease of 10% compared to 2008.

The electricity generated by wind energy increased from 1990 to 2013 by an average of 19% per year to 2713 MW. In 2013, wind energy generated 9% of the total electricity in the Netherlands, compared to 3.9% in 2009. The wind capacity installed at the end of 2010 would produce 4.1% of the total electricity in a normal year, while the equivalent value for Germany was 9.4%, Portugal 14%, and Denmark 39% in 2014.

== Coal-based power generation ==
The Netherlands has five coal-fired plants. Three new coal-fired plants were opened in 2015–2016, two in the Maasvlakte and one in the Eemshaven. At the same time, three old plants were closed down in Nijmegen, Borssele, and Geertruidenberg, while two other plants (Maasvlakte I and II) were planned to be closed before 1 July 2017. A discussion is taking place on what to do with the five operational coal-fired plants and whether they should be closed down. However, according to the government, the remaining five plants should stay open due to the Netherlands' dependency on the energy produced by these coal-fired plants. The tables show an overview of the Netherlands' operational and recently closed/opened coal-fired power plants.

=== Operational ===
Power plant	Location	Company	Generation capacity	Status	Fuel
Amercentrale (Unit 9)	Geertruidenberg	RWE (RWE Generation NL)	600 MW	Opened in 1993	Biomass only
Maasvlakte 3	Maasvlakte	Uniper & Engie	1,070 MW	Opened in 2016 (Coal/Bio-Mass)	Fossil and biomass
Eemshaven	Eemshaven	RWE (RWE Generation NL)	1,560 MW (2 units)	Opened in 2015	Fossil and biomass
Onyx	Rotterdam	Riverstone	731 MW	Opened in 2015	Fossil and biomass
Total			3,961 MW		

=== Closed ===
Power plant	Location	Company	Generation capacity	Status
Hemweg 8	Amsterdam	Vattenfall	650 MW	Closed in December 2019
Amercentrale (Unit 8)	Geertruidenberg	RWE/Essent	645 MW	Closed in January 2016
Gelderland	Nijmegen	Engie/Electrabel	590 MW	Closed in January 2016
Borssele	Borssele	EPZ (Delta & RWE/Essent)	426 MW	Closed in January 2016
Maasvlakte 1&2	Rotterdam	E.ON	1,040 MW	Closed; Replaced by Maasvlakte 3
Willem-Alexander	Buggenum	Vattenfall	253 MW	Closed in April 2013
Total			3,604 MW	

== Electricity Use ==
External images
- TenneT grid map, small
- TenneT grid map, large (PDF) Archive

According to the IEA, the total electricity use (gross production + imports + exports + transmission/distribution losses) in the Netherlands in 2008, was 119 TWh. In 2014, electricity use had decreased to 113 TWh. The total electricity consumption in 2021 had risen again to 117 terawatt-hours (TWh).

The Netherlands has three electricity import/export connections with Germany and two with Belgium, both alternating current power lines. Additionally, it has direct current (HVDC) submarine power cables to Norway (the 700 MW NorNed cable since 2008), England (the 1,000 MW BritNed cable since 2011), and Denmark (the 700 MW COBRAcable cable since 2019). In addition, a fourth connection with Germany is being realized. A 24 MW / 48 MWh grid battery opened in 2023, and a 300 MW / 1200 MWh battery started construction in 2025.

== Carbon dioxide emissions ==
In 2007, total emissions of carbon dioxide per capita were 11.1 tons. This is compared to the EU27 average of 7.9 tons CO_{2}. Emissions per capita in the OECD countries exceeded the Netherlands only in the Czech Republic (11.8), Finland (12.2), Canada (17.4), Australia (18.8), the United States (19.1), and Luxembourg (22.4).

Emissions grew by 16.4% between 1990 and 2007, but between 2002 and 2012, the emission per capita decreased by 6.1% tons of CO_{2}. The IEA showed that for a longer time period, from 1990 to 2012, there had been an overall reduction in emissions of 8%, while GDP grew by around 50% in the same period.

== Energy Agreement for Sustainable Growth ==
In September 2013, representatives from the Dutch government, environmentalists, and the energy sector – representing 47 different parties – signed the Energy Agreement for Sustainable Growth. This agreement contained plans for investing in energy conservation and renewable energy generation, and was projected to deliver tens of thousands of new jobs, improve industry competitiveness, and increase exports. The stakeholders had agreed that 16% of the energy would be generated by renewable energy sources in 2023, and five coal-fired plants built in the 1980s would be closed in 2016 and 2017. The other remaining five coal-fired plants would remain open and be used for co-firing biomass, a 4 billion euro measure that would contribute 1.2% of the total planned production of renewable energy. This agreement was seen as a major breakthrough in the debate about climate change in the Netherlands, because it not only provided a clear set of policies for sustainable growth, but also gathered support from all main stakeholders.

=== Resistance to the Energy Agreement ===
The Energy Agreement did not find unanimous support. Urgenda, an environmental organisation, did not sign the agreement. Urgenda called the agreement a weak compromise without any sense of urgency, and sued the Dutch government on these grounds on 20 November 2013, thereby originating the case State of the Netherlands v. Urgenda Foundation. They alleged the Dutch state acted unlawfully by not contributing its proportional share to prevent global warming and won the case. This forced the Dutch government to take further action to reduce the Netherlands’ share of global emissions. This was the first time that a judge had legally required a State to take precautions against climate change.

Although many politicians supported the decision, the government appealed the verdict on the grounds that they questioned the way the court assessed their policy. They still promised, however, that new measures to comply with the verdict would be carried out. Urgenda described the appeal as a delaying tactic; 28,000 citizens signed a petition urging the government to accept the verdict rather than appeal.

=== Debate about closure of coal-firing plants ===
In October 2015, many politicians lost confidence in the agreement and demanded an additional set of measures when evidence emerged that the Energy Agreement's measures could not achieve their intended goals. In December 2015, a majority of the House of Representatives supported closing all Dutch coal-firing plants in the near future, implying a policy contradiction: closing the additional coal-firing plants would interfere with the execution of the Energy Agreement because it would end the co-firing of biomass. Additionally, three new coal plants were just finished costing 1.5 billion euros each. Some politicians suggested redirecting the initial subsidies for co-firing biomass into compensation to close the new coal-firing plants, while others opposed the plan because they were afraid that it would cost too many jobs.

Nuon, the Dutch subsidiary of the Swedish company Vattenfall, which owns the Hemwegcentrale, stated that it was open to discussion about the closure of the plant. Essent, the owner of Eemshavencentrale, on the other hand, believed that the closure of the plants would only work counterproductively in reaching the energy goals. Henk Kamp, the Minister of Economic Affairs, promised that the Dutch government would make a decision by the autumn of 2016.

In January 2016, the three oldest coal-firing plants were closed in Nijmegen, Borssele and Geertruidenberg. Two more closures were scheduled for 1 July 2017: Maasvlakte I and II.

=== 2017 Energy Agreement debate ===
At the end of January 2017, Minister Kamp sent a letter to the House of Representatives saying that no decision would be made by the incumbent government on the closure of the remaining five coal plants. Instead of a concrete plan, the minister sent a study by the German research agency Frontier Economics to the House, as well as the final advice of the individual members of the advisory group with whom the minister had consulted on this matter. These advisory group members included the Confederation of Netherlands Industry and Employers, the Federation of Dutch Trade Unions, environmental organisations, and the Dutch industrial energy consumer lobby VEMW. They did not agree on a common position, and hence the difficult issue of the coal-fired power stations would be passed over during the elections of 15 March 2017.

== 2018 ban on coal-fired power plants ==
On 18 May 2018, the Minister of Economic Affairs and Climate Policy Eric Wiebes announced that the Netherlands would ban the use of coal in electricity generation by the end of 2029. Two of the five remaining coal-fired plants (Amercentrale Unit 9 & Hemweg 8) would have to shut down at the end of 2024 unless they switched primary fuels.

== See also ==
- Energy in the Netherlands
- Renewable energy in the Netherlands
