= Solar power in the Netherlands =

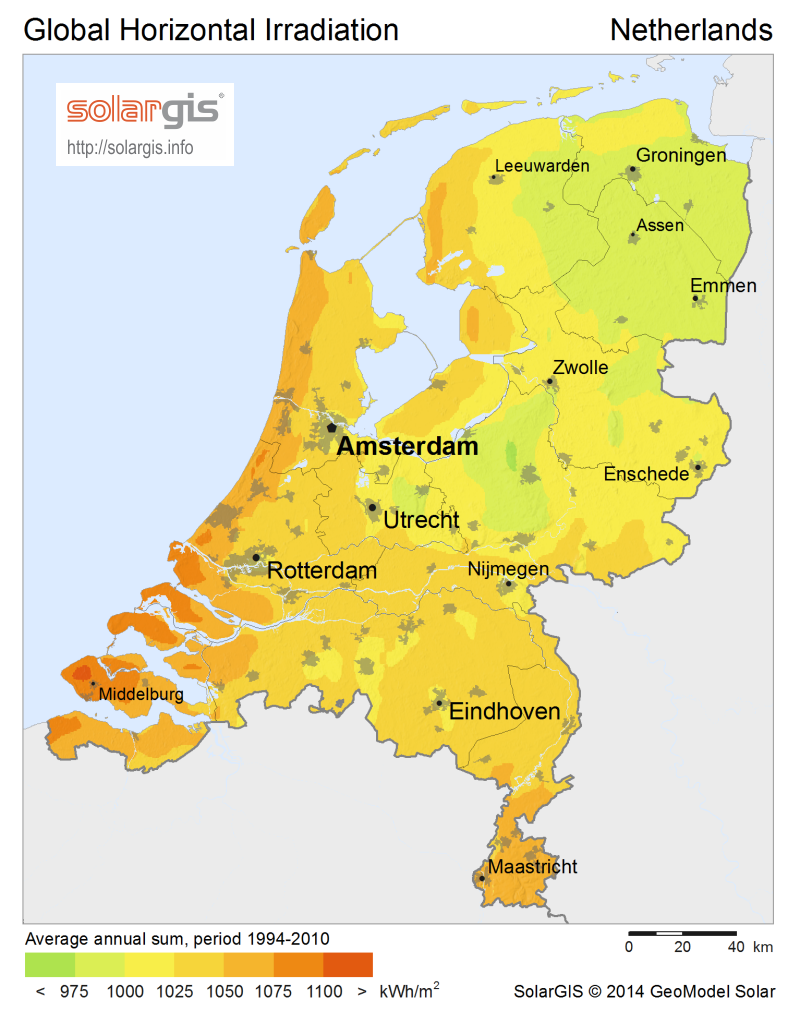
- Solar irradiation map of Nethlands
- Installed capacity: 24.05 GW (2024) (11th)
- Annual generation: 21.65 TWh (2024)
- Capacity per capita: 1,353 W (2024)
- Share of electricity: 17.7 (2024)

Solar power in the Netherlands has an installed capacity of around 23,904 megawatt (MW) of photovoltaics as of the end of 2023. Around 4,304 MW of new capacity was installed during 2023.

Market research firm GlobalData projects Dutch solar PV capacity could rise to 55,000 MW (55 GW) by 2035. Longer-term projections from the Netherlands Organisation for Applied Scientific Research estimate national PV capacity could reach 180 GW by 2050.

== Timeline ==
2008 Subsidies of 33 euro cents per kWh were introduced but initially failed to attract much development. However, when they were curtailed, the Dutch banded together to make large purchases at discount instead.

2011 A 500-kilowatt solar array was added to the roof of Rotterdam's central train station.

2012 Solar capacity more than doubled to 321 MW with new added capacity of 175 MW.

2013 According to the Dutch grid operators, solar capacity grew to a cumulative power of 655.4 MW at the end of 2013

2014 By August 2014, the total had reached 1 GW mark for the first time.

2015 The Netherlands saw its capacity grow by around 357 MW during 2015, the fourth highest in Europe in that year, its installed capacity per inhabitant remained low at 83.1 Watts per inhabitant compared to the European average of 186.1 Wp/inhab, in particular compared to its neighbour Belgium at 286.7 Wp/inhab.

2016 The largest solar installation in the Netherlands, the 6 MW array at the Wadden-Island Ameland was officially opened in June 2016. Installed capacity per capita rose to 120.1 W, thirteenth position in the EU and nearer to the EU average of 197.8 W than in preceding years.

2019 The largest solar installation in the Netherlands, the 103 MWp array in Groningen, becomes operational.

2020 The Netherlands passed the 10.000 MWp of installed PV capacity, becoming the 10th country to pass the 10 GW barrier.

2022 A new solar carport measuring 1 kilometer by 500 meters opened in Flevoland. The 90.000 solar panels with 35 MWp will power 10.000 households.

2024 The Netherlands has 0% purchase VAT and net-metering for private solar panels. This is set to end on 1 January 2027.

== Statistics ==
View source data.
Cumulative installed solar capacity in the Netherlands since 2010
View source data.
Yearly added solar capacity in the Netherlands since 2010

Deployment of photovoltaic systems in the Netherlands. Nameplate capacity in MW_{P}.

Year	Installed capacity (MWp)	Annual generation (GWh)	% of electricity consumption	Capacity factor in percent (Note: Calculated value from total installed nameplate capacity and actual electricity generation. Statistical artifacts possible if new capacity was added late in the year)
2000	13	8	0.01	7.025
2001	21	12	0.01	6.523
2002	26	16	0.01	7.025
2003	46	25	0.02	6.204
2004	50	34	0.03	7.763
2005	51	35	0.03	7.834
2006	53	37	0.03	7.969
2007	54	38	0.03	8.033
2008	59	40	0.03	7.739
2009	69	45	0.04	7.445
2010	90	56	0.05	7.103
2011	149	104	0.08	7.968
2012	287	191	0.16	7.597
2013	650	410	0.34	7.201
2014	1,007	725	0.61	8.219
2015	1,526	1,109	0.93	8.296
2016	2,135	1,602	1.33	8.566
2017	2,911	2,208	1.83	8.659
2018	4,608	3,709	3.04	9.188
2019	7,226	5,399	4.42	8.529
2020	11,108	8,568	7.10	8.805
2021	14,823	11,304	9.23	8.705
2022	17,356	16,657	14.20	10.956
2023	21,957	19,607	16.91	10.194
2024	24,772	21,822	18.24	10.056
2025	25,878	25,520	21.09	11.258

In addition to photovoltaics, solar energy is used extensively for heating water, with 669.313 m2 installed by the end of 2020. Generating a total of 326 GWh heat energy in 2020.

== Solar PV market by segment ==
Installed solar capacity by class
Installation type	2023	2022	2021	2020	2019
<15kW (MWp)	10,626	8,354	6,069	4,677	3,473
>15kW roof based (MWp)	9.102	7,359	5,749	4,330	2,714
>15kW ground based (MWp)	4,533	3,887	3,005	2,101	1,039
Total installations	2,808,438	2,294,154	1,730,285	1,383,888	1,062,265
Residential capacity (MWp)	10,106	8,028	5,843	4,488	3,236
Residential installations	2,581,279	2,129,616	1,611,689	1,267,651	960,248

Installed capacity in the Netherlands by class size, 2017
<10 kW	(approx 2,300 MW) 79.1%
10-100 kW	(90 MW) 3.1%
100-500 kW	(317 MW) 10.9%
>500 kW	(200 MW) 6.9%

Nearly 80% of solar power installed in the Netherlands in 2017 was for small systems of less than 10 kW, a large part being rooftop Solar PV. Larger systems over 500 kW accounted for just 6.9% of the total. By the end of 2018 private residential rooftop systems had an installed capacity of 2,307 MW, businesses rooftop systems 1,662 MW whilst solar parks amounted to 444 MW.

=== Residential solar PV capacity ===
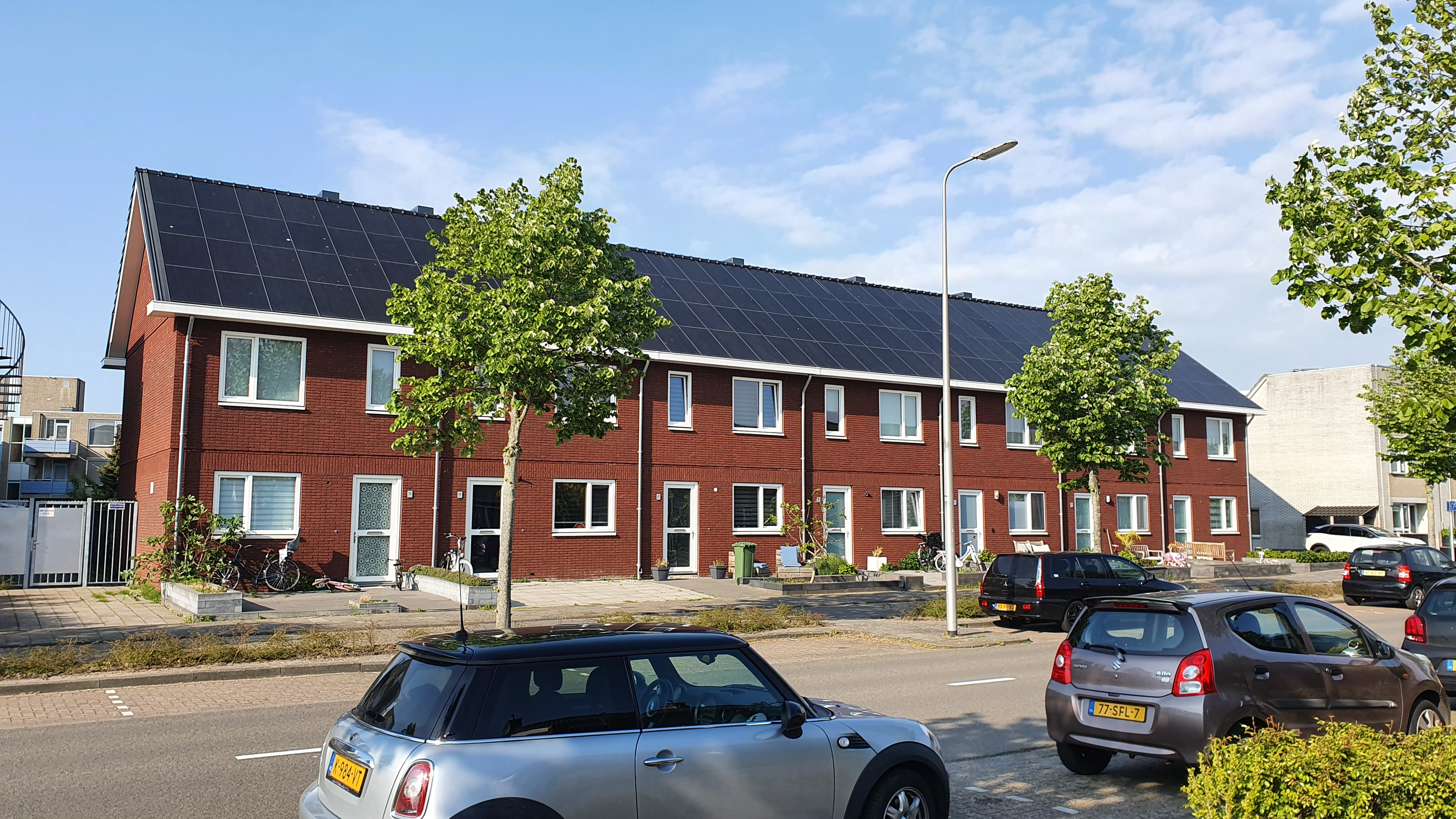
Houses with integrated PV rooftop in Alphen aan den Rijn, Netherlands

Residential solar capacity
Year	Capacity (MWp)	Installations	Number of homes	Percentage
2012	182	71,166	7,449,298	0.96
2013	431	146,340	7,535,315	1.94
2014	671	216,788	7,587,964	2.86
2015	972	307,938	7,641,323	4.03
2016	1,261	397,390	7,686,178	5.17
2017	1,682	529,005	7,740,984	6.83
2018	2,329	720,522	7,814,912	9.22
2019	3,326	960,248	7,891,786	12.17
2020	4,488	1,267,651	7,966,331	15.91
2021	5,843	1,611,689	8,045,580	20.03
2022	8,028	2,129,616	8,125,229	26.20
2023	10,106	2,581,279	8,204,049	31.46

According to a report on behalf of the European Commission in 2015 the Netherlands had an estimated 1,086 MW of residential solar PV capacity with 232,000 residential solar PV prosumers in the country, representing 3% of households. The average size of residential solar PV systems is estimated to be 4.69 kW moving to 2030. The technical potential for residential solar PV in the Netherlands is estimated at 13,945 MW. The payback time for residential Solar PV in the Netherlands is 9.7 years as of 2015. Some of the advantages of small scale residential solar include eliminating the need for extra land, keeping cost saving advantages in local communities and empowering households to become prosumers of renewable electricity and thus raising awareness of wasteful consumption habits and environmental issues through direct experience. By 2018 residential Solar PV had more than doubled to 2,307 MW. at the end of 2022 around 2 million households (25% of households) had solar rooftop systems installed.

=== Solar roads ===
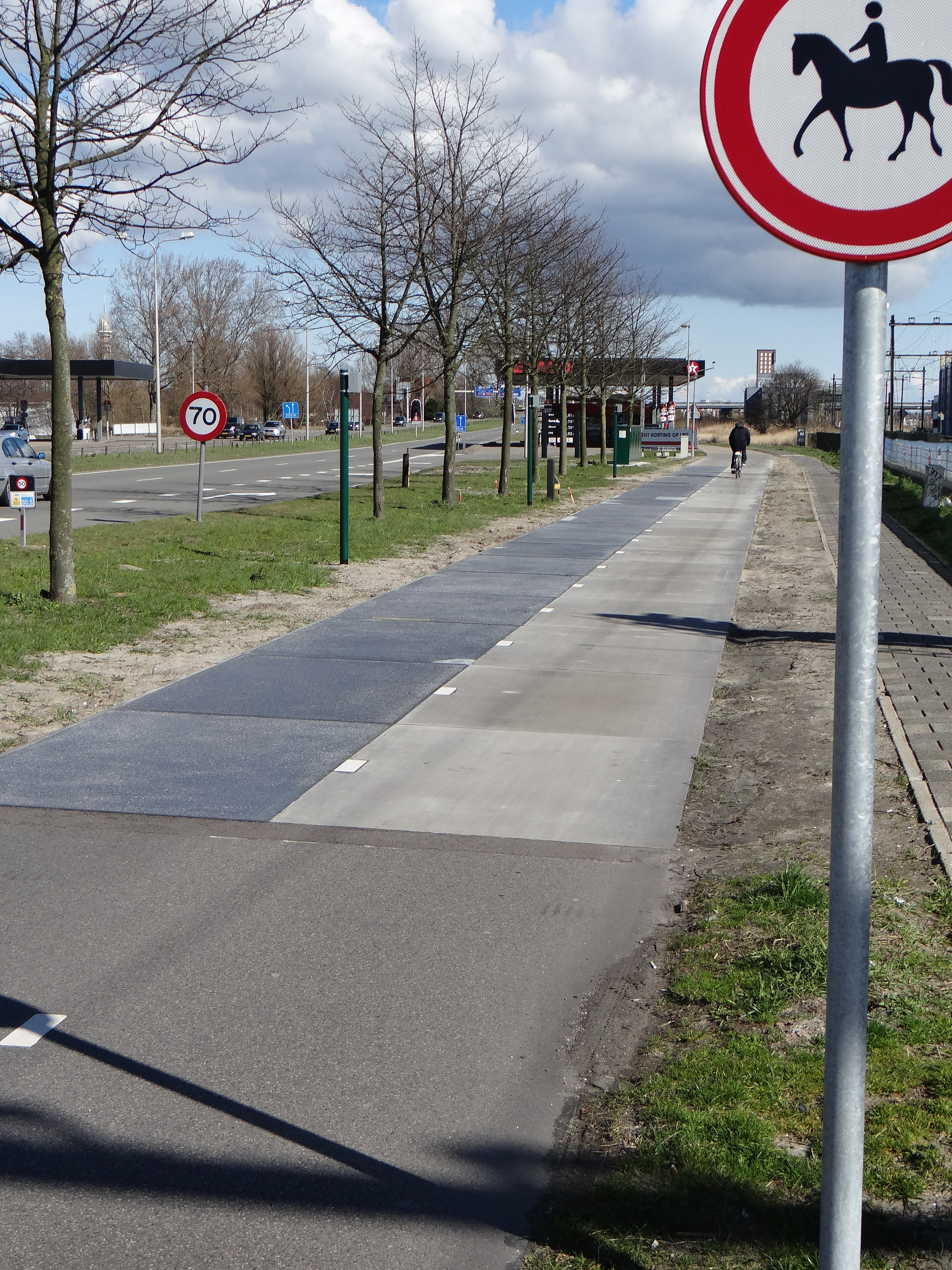
SolaRoad cycle path in Krommenie

In November 2014 SolaRoad, the world's first experimental solar cycle path, was opened in the village of Krommenie. The aim of the project is to test the practicality and cost efficiency of embedding solar panels into a cycle path. The idea is that the path, which is expected to generate 50 to 70 kWh/m^{2} each year, can power anything from street lights or traffic lights to electric cars or houses. The developers of SolaRoad believe that up to 20% of the 140,000 km of road in the Netherlands could be used to harvest solar energy.

In 2017 solar panels were installed in a cycle path in Blauwestad. The solar panels were removed at the end of 2021 because of the reconstruction of the cycle path and the public space around it.

In April 2017 the first heated solar cycle path was installed in the Bovenbuurtweg in Ede. The panels would stay free of snow and ice during the winter. In February 2020 the solar panels were replaced with panels with a different surface coating to make the cycle path less slippery. However by 2021 the solar panels were gone and replaced by a surface made of bricks.

In May 2018 a 20 meter long solar road with 48 solar panels opened on the N401 near Kockengen. The trial was supposed to last two years, but was stopped a year earlier on 16 May 2019 because of safety concerns. The rough surface had worn down and had become too slippery to safely drive on. In that time the solar road geretated around 2,200 kWh of electricity. The trial was seen as a success.

In May 2018 a 10 meter long and 3.5 meter wide solar cycle path was built in Haaksbergen.

In September 2018 solar panels were installed in the road surface of one of the shoulder lanes of the A2 motorway near Maarssen. The solar panels cover an area of 25 square meters.

On 7 March 2019 a 2-year pilot project with a 100 meter long solar bus lane opened on the N218 in Spijkenisse. The solar road was supposed to generate 30,000 kWh per year. Enough to supply electricity to around 9 households. One week after opening damage was found to the top layer of the solar road and the bus lane was closed for traffic. Investigation found that the solar panel and top layer had detached from the underlying concrete and repair would not be possible. In July 2019 the province of South Holland made the decision to discontinue the pilot and the solar road was removed.

A Similar pilot project opened on 7 March 2019 with a 50 meter long solar road on the N232 in near Schiphol. This solar road suffered from the same problems as the one in Spijkenisse. The road was closed on 13 March 2019, just one week after it was opened.

In May 2019 the new Boekelose bridge with solar panels in the road surface opened in Hengelo. In January 2020 a new coating layer was applied because the original coating had worn away and the panels had become too slippery for motorcycles to safely drive on. In November 2022, the municipality of Hengelo announced its intention to remove the solar panels in the near future. The panels were not working as well as they originally expected and already showed considerable damage. Half a year later by May 2023, a panel partially detached from the bridge. According to the municipality there was no danger to road safety, but it did place temporary signs warning of the poor road surface on the bridge.

In May 2019 solar panels were installed in the cycle path next to the N324 in Grave.

In February 2020 solar panels were installed in a cycle path on the Westerweg near Den Burg, Texel. The panels cover an area of 10 square meters.

In February 2020 a 25 meter long solar cycle path was installed next to the N225 in Rhenen.

In 2021 a 60 square meter solar road for testing different kind of solar panels was opened at the Chemelot Campus in Geleen.

On 14 July 2021 a 330 meter long solar cycle path opened next to the N417 in Maartensdijk. It was the longest solar cycle path in the world when it opened. The cycle path consists of 120 modules. Initially it was estimated that the cycle path would produce about 137,000 kWh per year, which is enough electricity for around 40 households. However, due to construction errors only half of the panels are properly connected and thus the actual generated electricity is a lot lower than originally estimated. The connections are buried within the concrete, thus making it hard to repair.

In 2022 a 35 meter long solar cycle path was installed next to the N395 near Oirschot. The solar panels cover an area of 100 square meters.

On 24 March 2023 a new solar footpath was opened in the city of Groningen. The footpath consists of 2544 individual solar tiles. It has a total area of 400 square meters.

A 400 meter long solar cycle path is planned next to the N232 near Schiphol. Another 400 meter long cycle path is planned next to the N285 in Wagenberg. Both cycle paths are planned to open in 2023 and will be monitored for 5 years.

=== Large scale solar parks ===
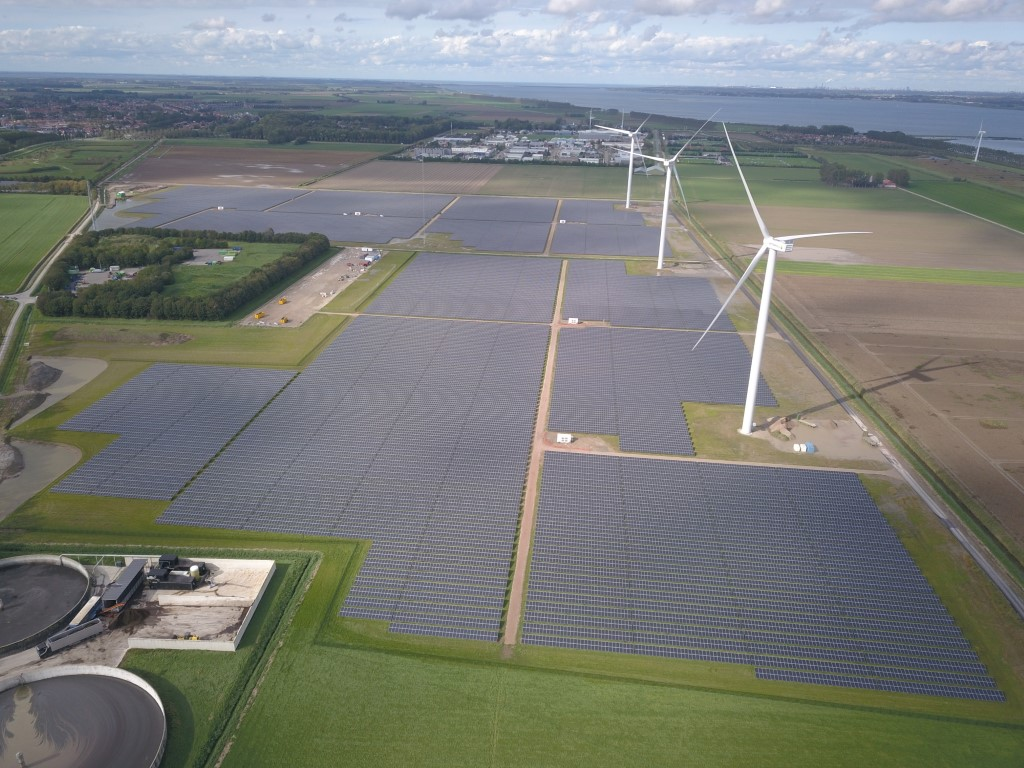
Energiepark Haringvliet Zuid

Solar park	Province	Capacity (MWp)	Commissioning	Location	Notes/Ref
Dorhout Mees	Flevoland	144	2022	52.4141°N 5.6841°E	
Vloeivelden Hollandia	Drenthe	120	2021	52.9323°N 6.9097°E	
Vlagtwedde	Groningen	110	2020	52.9781°N 7.0779°E	
Fledderbosch	Groningen	103.5	2024	53.2560°N 6.6864°E	
Midden-Groningen	Groningen	103	2019	53.1760°N 6.7753°E	
Stadskanaal	Groningen	101	2020	53.0106°N 6.9423°E	

Location map

=== Floating solar parks ===
Solar park	Province	Capacity (MWp)	Panels	Commissioning	Location	Notes/Ref
Sellingen	Groningen	41.4	76,616	2021	52.9446°N 7.0943°E	
De Uivermeertjes	Gelderland	29.7	56,056	2021	51.8770°N 5.6698°E	
Bofhomsplas	Overijssel	27.3	72,000	2020	52.5453°N 6.1509°E	
Oudehaske II	Friesland	21.3	38.800	2023	52.9685°N 5.8793°E	
Hattemerbroek	Gelderland	16.4	30.000	2023	52.4875°N 6.0146°E	
Beilen	Drenthe	16	40,000	2021	52.8580°N 6.4841°E	
Kloosterhaar	Overijssel	16	40,000	2021	52.5159°N 6.6985°E	
Tynaarlo	Drenthe	15.1	39,000	2019/2021	53.0888°N 6.6341°E	
Sekdoornse Plas	Overijssel	14.5	40,000	2020	52.4836°N 6.1413°E	
Lippe Gabriëlsplas	Friesland	14	25,000	2022	53.1151°N 6.1732°E	
Nij Beets	Friesland	13.6	33,000	2021	53.0659°N 6.0341°E	
Oudehaske I	Friesland	7	17,000	2021	52.9704°N 5.8723°E	
Drakenrijk	Limburg	7	12,896	2023	51.2695°N 6.0816°E	
Lingepolder	Gelderland	6.4	14.144	2022	51.9234°N 5.4768°E	
Amercentrale	North Brabant	6.1	13,468	2022	51.7094°N 4.8384°E	
Berenplaat	South Holland	4.8	9,000	2023	51.8347°N 4.4133°E	
Zonnevijver Boskoop	South Holland	3.4	7,700	2021	52.0965°N 4.6685°E	
Lacustris	North Holland	2.6	-	2019	52.7739°N 5.0591°E	
Zaltbommel	Gelderland	2.5	4,545	2023	51.7990°N 5.2811°E	
Oosterwolde	Friesland	2.1	5,500	2020	53.0342°N 6.3578°E	
Lingewaard	Gelderland	1.25	6,150	2018	51.9262°N 5.9027°E	
Havikerwaard	Gelderland	-	5,300	2022	51.9998°N 6.0938°E	
Azewijnse Broek	Gelderland	-	3,140	2022	51.8774°N 6.3382°E	

Location map

== Gallery ==
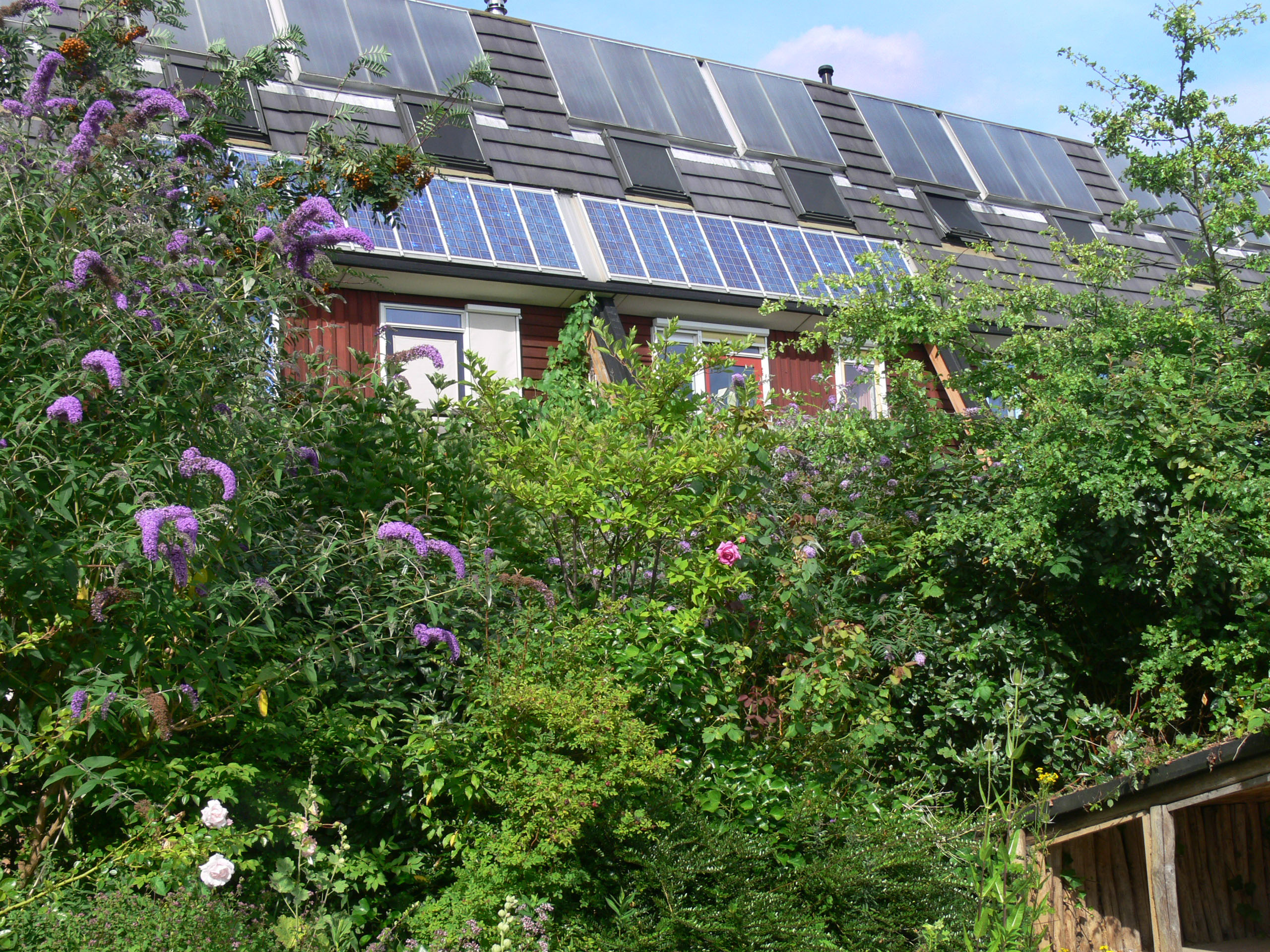
Solar PV panels and solar hot water panels combined on rooftop

== See also ==
- Solar power in the European Union
- Wind power in the Netherlands
- Hydroelectric power in the Netherlands
- Renewable energy in the Netherlands
