= Energy in the Netherlands =

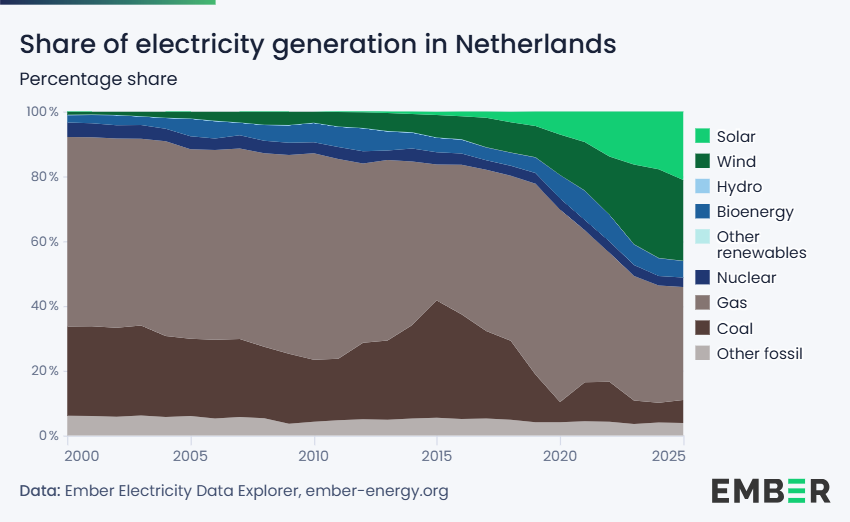
Electricity generation in the Netherlands by source – percentage share

Development of carbon dioxide emissions

Energy in the Netherlands describes energy and electricity production, consumption and import in the Netherlands. Electricity sector in the Netherlands is the main article of electricity in the Netherlands.

In 2020 the Netherlands was reliant on fossil fuel for energy needs, especially natural gas, however the plan is to bring renewable power up to 70% of the electricity needs of the Netherlands by 2030.

Renewable sources accounted for 49% of total electricity production in the Netherlands in 2025, remaining the country's largest source of electricity generation. Renewable electricity production increased by 6% compared to 2024.

== Energy statistics ==
2020 energy statistics

Production capacities for electricity (billion kWh)
Type	Amount
Fossil fuel	259.72
Wind power	49.81
Biomass	32.32
Solar	25.86
Nuclear	12.55
Total	381.26

Electricity (billion kWh)
Category	Amount
Consumption	109.80
Production	117.52
Import	19.77
Export	22.43

Natural Gas (billion m^{3})
Consumption	44.75
Produce	32.86
Import	55.77
Export	42.83

Crude Oil (barrels per day)
Consumption	334,050,000
Production	27,780,000
Import	400,220,000
Export	3,210,000

CO_{2} emissions:
130.32 million tons

== Energy plans ==
The Netherlands has set a target of 70% of electricity from renewable sources (mainly solar and wind power) by 2030.

=== Transition away from natural gas ===
To reduce its greenhouse emissions, the government of the Netherlands is subsidizing a transition away from natural gas for all homes in the country by 2050. In The Netherlands, no new residential gas accounts are allowed as of July 1, 2018, and all homes should be converted by 2050. Electric stoves are expected to replace gas stoves.

District heating is expected to replace natural gas for the heating of buildings in cities, while most other buildings will convert to heatpumps. New sources are expected to include geothermal energy, surface waters, and data centers.

In the Netherlands, 78% of enterprises have invested in reducing carbon emissions and mitigating the impact of weather disasters as of 2023. Six out of ten (60%) plan to invest in these areas during the next three years. The numbers for 'already invested' and 'intend to invest' are above the EU average (56% and 54%, respectively).

=== Types of Energy Contracts ===
There are typically three types of energy contracts available in the Netherlands:

- Fixed Energy Contract (vast energiecontract): This contract is for a fixed amount of time (one to five years), allowing consumers to lock in their energy rate. While a fixed rate protects against price increases, it also means consumers do not benefit from price drops. Early cancellation typically incurs a fee.
- Non-Fixed Energy Contract (variabel energiecontract): This contract is for an indefinite period and can usually be cancelled monthly. Rates are generally fixed for six months but can be adjusted more frequently during energy crises. Consumers may benefit from price drops but are also exposed to price increases.
- Dynamic Energy Contract (dynamisch energiecontract / flexible energiecontract): Similar to a non-fixed contract, this type can be cancelled monthly. However, rates vary hourly based on demand and supply. Consumers can save by using energy when prices are low but are also exposed to hourly price increases.

== Energy sources ==
=== Nuclear ===
Borssele is the only nuclear power station in the Netherlands and produces around 4 billion kilowatt hours (kWh) per annum, around 3.3% of electricity used in the Netherlands.

=== Fossil fuels ===
==== Coal ====
The Netherlands has two coal-fired power stations, at Eemshaven and Maasvlakte. They are scheduled to close by 2030.

==== Natural Gas ====
The last of the fourteen natural gas power stations were commissioned in 2013. In 2020, 64.2% of the power generated in the Netherlands came from gas-fired thermal power.

=== Renewables ===
Years in which the last three renewable power levels achieved
Achievement	Year	Achievement	Year	Achievement	Year
5%	2014	10%	2020	15%	not achieved

Renewable energy includes wind, solar, biomass and geothermal energy sources.

==== Wind power ====
In December 2020 the Netherlands had 2,606 wind turbines, which over the course of that year generated 15.3 billion kWh (an average of 1.74 GW).

By December 2023 the Netherlands will have 4.7 GW of offshore wind farm capacity, which will provide 15.8% of total current electricity demand in the Netherlands.

==== Solar power ====
In 2022 the Netherlands generated 14 per cent of its electricity from solar farms.

==== Biomass ====
Biomass provides around 8% of electricity capacity

=== Hydroelectric ===
The Netherlands has under 40 MW hydroelectric power capacity.

== See also ==
- Electricity sector in the Netherlands
