= Dodewaard nuclear power plant =

Nuclear power plant in the Netherlands

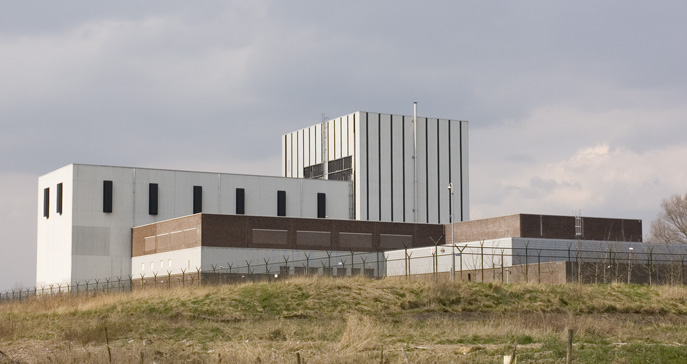
- The Dodewaard NPP today in its shut down state viewed from the Rhine river bank
- Country: Netherlands
- Location: Dodewaard
- Coordinates: 51°53′58″N 5°41′10″E
- Status: Decommissioned
- Commission date: 26 March 1969
- Decommission date: 26 March 1997
- Operator: Gemeenschappelijke Kernenergiecentrale Nederland

Nuclear power station
- Reactors: 1
- Reactor type: BWR

Power generation
- Nameplate capacity: 60 MW

External links
- Website: www.kcd.nl
- Commons: Related media on Commons

Dodewaard nuclear power plant was a nuclear power plant with a 55 MWe boiling water reactor (BWR) of General Electric in the Dutch town of Dodewaard. The plant halted energy production in 1997. Its final decommissioning has been postponed for a period of 40 years, and the plant was placed into a safe enclosure configuration in 2005.

== History ==
Construction of the nuclear reactor plant in Dodewaard (1 August 1966)

The plant in Dodewaard was the Netherlands' first nuclear power plant. It was built by the Dutch government, mainly to acquire know-how in the construction and operation of a nuclear power plant. The plant was therefore relatively small with a net output of only 58 MW. Construction was started in 1965 and the facility opened on 26 March 1969, in the presence of Queen Juliana.

After the Chernobyl disaster in 1986, the political tide turned against nuclear energy, which was already a heavily debated issue in Dutch politics. With no prospect of new nuclear power plants being built in the Netherlands, Dodewaard's role as a research centre became superfluous. The ownership decided to halt electricity production at the relatively small and expensive plant in 1997.

== Closure and decommissioning ==
On 26 March 1997, the complex was shut down, seven years earlier than initially planned. After a period of forty years, the plant will be demolished and the site will become available for other purposes.

In May 2002, a decommissioning license was granted to Gemeenschappelijke Kernenergiecentrale Nederland (GKN), the operator of the nuclear power plant. In July 2005, the safe enclosure was achieved. Dismantling is planned to start in 2045. The spent nuclear fuel was reprocessed at Sellafield and returned to the interim storage facility Central Organisation for Radioactive Waste (COVRA), where all Dutch radioactive waste will be stored for 100 years or longer. The remaining costs for decommissioning were, as of 2016, estimated 180 million euro, while some costs could be reduced and other costs increase in the future.^{, p. 174}

On 21 May 2020, a fire broke out on the roof of the outer containment building, which took several hours to bring under control. According to the authorities, no radioactive material was released into the environment during the incident.

== See also ==
- Borssele Nuclear Power Station
- Petten nuclear reactor
- List of commercial nuclear reactors § Netherlands
