= Elektriciteits Produktiemaatschappij Zuid-Nederland =

Utility company in the Netherlands

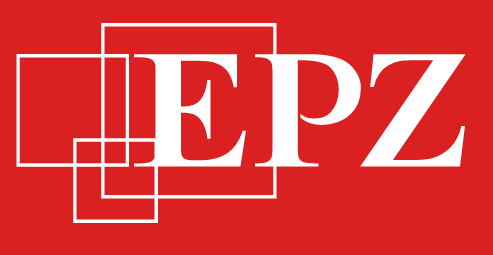
Elektriciteits Produktiemaatschappij Zuid-Nederland's logo

The 'Elektriciteits Produktiemaatschappij Zuid-Nederland (EPZ), or Electricity Production Company South-Netherlands is the operator of the coal- and nuclear power plants located in Borssele in the Netherlands. Borssele nuclear power plant is the only operational nuclear power plant in the Netherlands. EPZ is 70% owned by Delta and 30% owned by Energy Resources Holding (ERH). ERH was the property of several local governments in the Netherlands, but was acquired in 2011 by RWE as part of the deal to take over the Dutch energy company Essent.
