= Borssele =

- Village
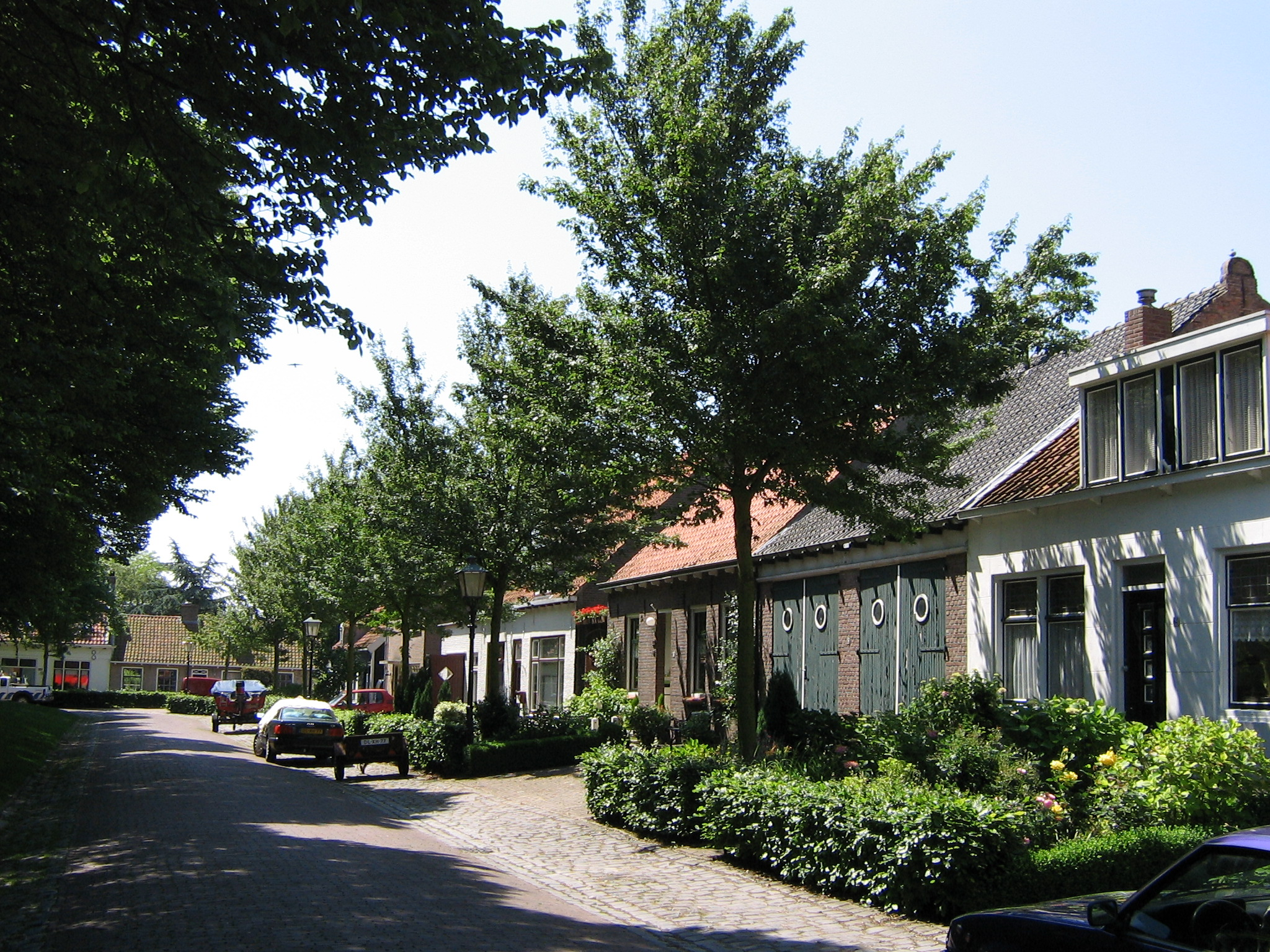
- Houses around the village square

- Flag Coat of arms

- Location in the province of Zeeland in the Netherlands Borssele (Netherlands)
- Coordinates: 51°25′23″N 3°44′7″E
- Country: Netherlands
- Province: Zeeland
- Municipality: Borsele

Area
  - Total: 12.63 km^{2} (4.88 sq mi)
- Elevation: 1.4 m (4.6 ft)

Population (2021)
  - Total: 1,440
  - Density: 114/km^{2} (295/sq mi)
- Time zone: UTC+1 (CET)
  - Summer (DST): UTC+2 (CEST)
- Postal code: 4454
- Dialing code: 0113

Borssele is a village in the Dutch province of Zeeland. It is a part of the municipality of Borsele, and lies about 12 km east of Vlissingen. The municipality name is spelled with a single s while the name of the town is spelled with a double s.

Borssele is home to the Borssele nuclear power plant.

The village's near-symmetrical street plan from 1616 follows a rectangular design with four streets all leading to a central square (called the "Plein"). The streets are named according to their cardinal directions.

== History ==
The village was first mentioned in 976 as Brumsale, and means "single room house on the bank". The island of Borssele was lost in 1530 and only the hill on which the castle had stood remained. The village of Monster which was located on the island had been destroyed. In 1615, a dike was built to reclaim the land. Borssele is a planned polder village which was designed in 1616 by Cornelis Adriaensz Soetwater.

The Dutch Reformed church was built between 1849 and 1852 in neoclassic style. The Vliedberg which is also called "Mountain of Troy" is the remnant of the 11th century castle.

Borssele was home to 819 people in 1840. In 1927, a railway station was built on the Goes to Hoedekenskerke railway line. It closed in 1934.

== Energy ==
The village is the site of the Netherlands' only commercial nuclear power plant, the 485 MW Borssele nuclear power plant.

A nearby area in the North Sea contains the Borssele Offshore Wind Farms, and is scheduled for more offshore wind farm development. The first two stages for a combined 700-760 MegaWatt capacity was awarded to DONG Energy (among 36-38 bidders) in July 2016 at a price of 7.27 euro cent per kilowatt hour for 15 years, after which it would produce at market conditions. The price will not be adjusted for inflation. TenneT receives a further €14/MWh (1.4 c/kWh) for transmission, giving a total price of €87/MWh (8.7 c/kWh).

Experts view the price as unusually low (the lowest price was 10.3 c/kWh), and consider finance, high wind of 9.5 m/s and scaling as main drivers for the decreased price. Proximity to shore also means the project can use alternating current transformer and cables to shore, instead of direct current, decreasing the cost. The wind farm operators only handle the farms, as TenneT handles the transmission. The 752 MW Borssele 1 & 2 was commissioned in late 2020. In April 2021, Ørsted agreed to sell half of the facility to Norges Bank Investment Management. One turbine caught fire in October 2021. Most of the wind farm continued operating. The facility is serviced by a surface effect ship.

Two more stages with a further 680-740 MW went on auction on 29 September 2016 with 26 bids from 7 consortia. The auction was won by the Blauwwind II c.v. consortium with 8MW Vestas-Mitsubishi turbines, at a price of 5.45 c/kWh. The total subsidy is estimated at €300 million, down from the expected €5 billion.

== Gallery ==
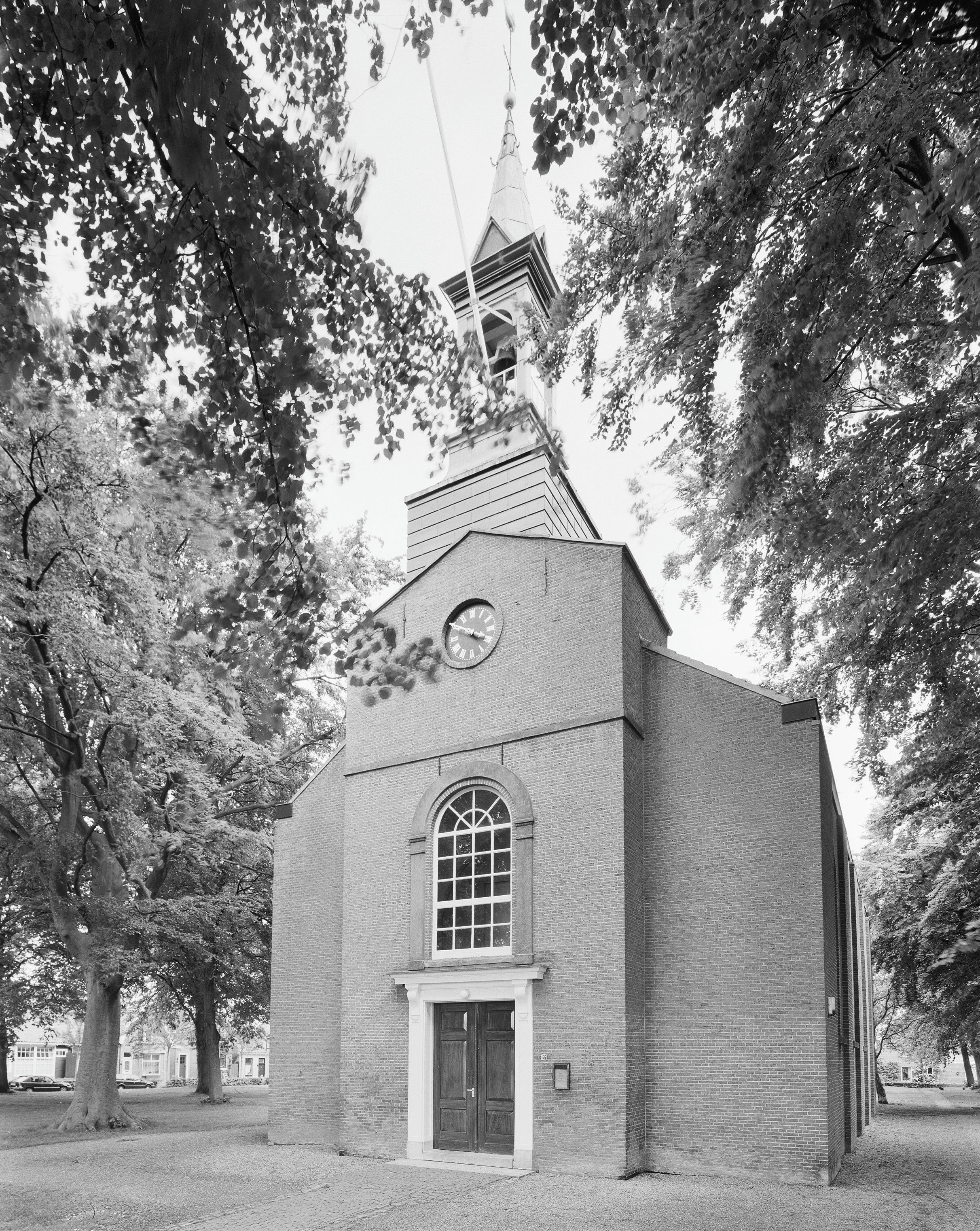
Church tower of Borssele

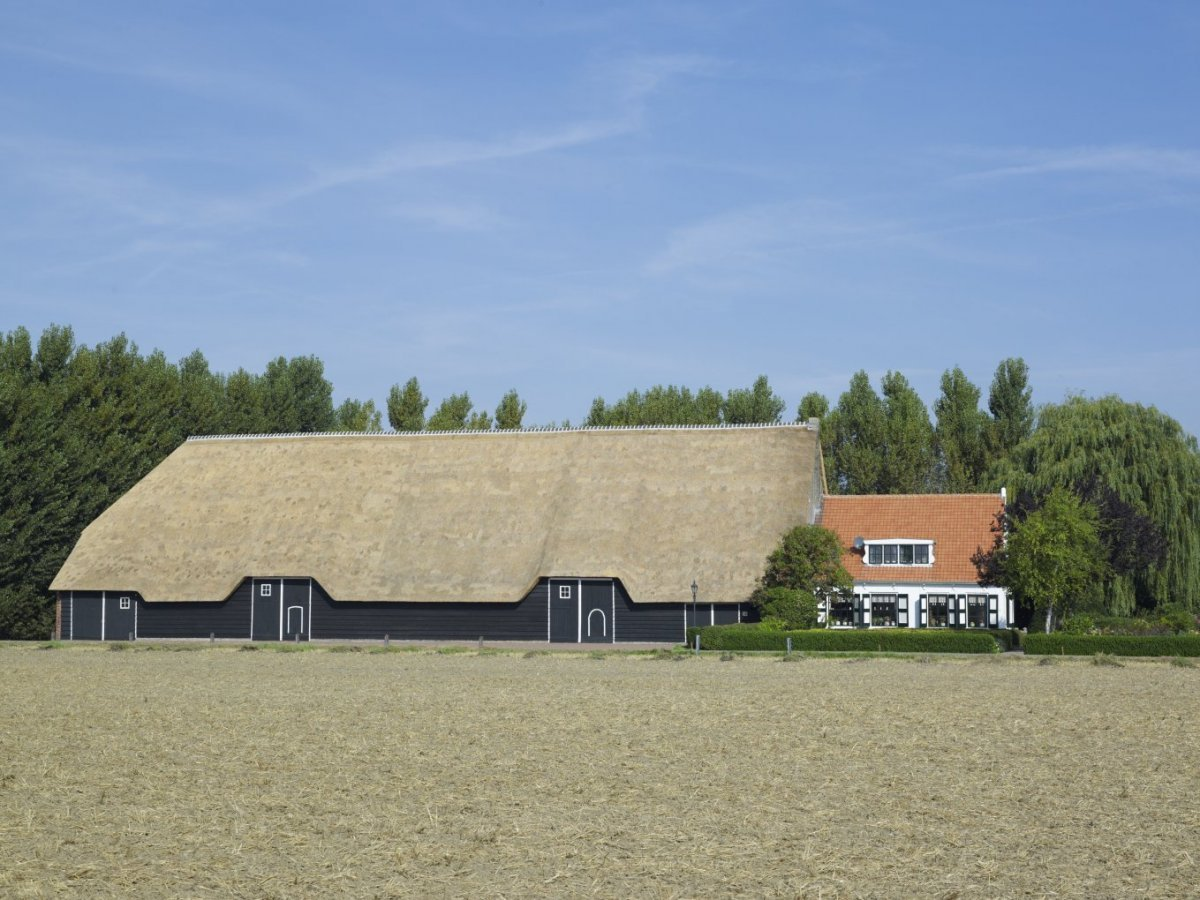
Farm near Borssele

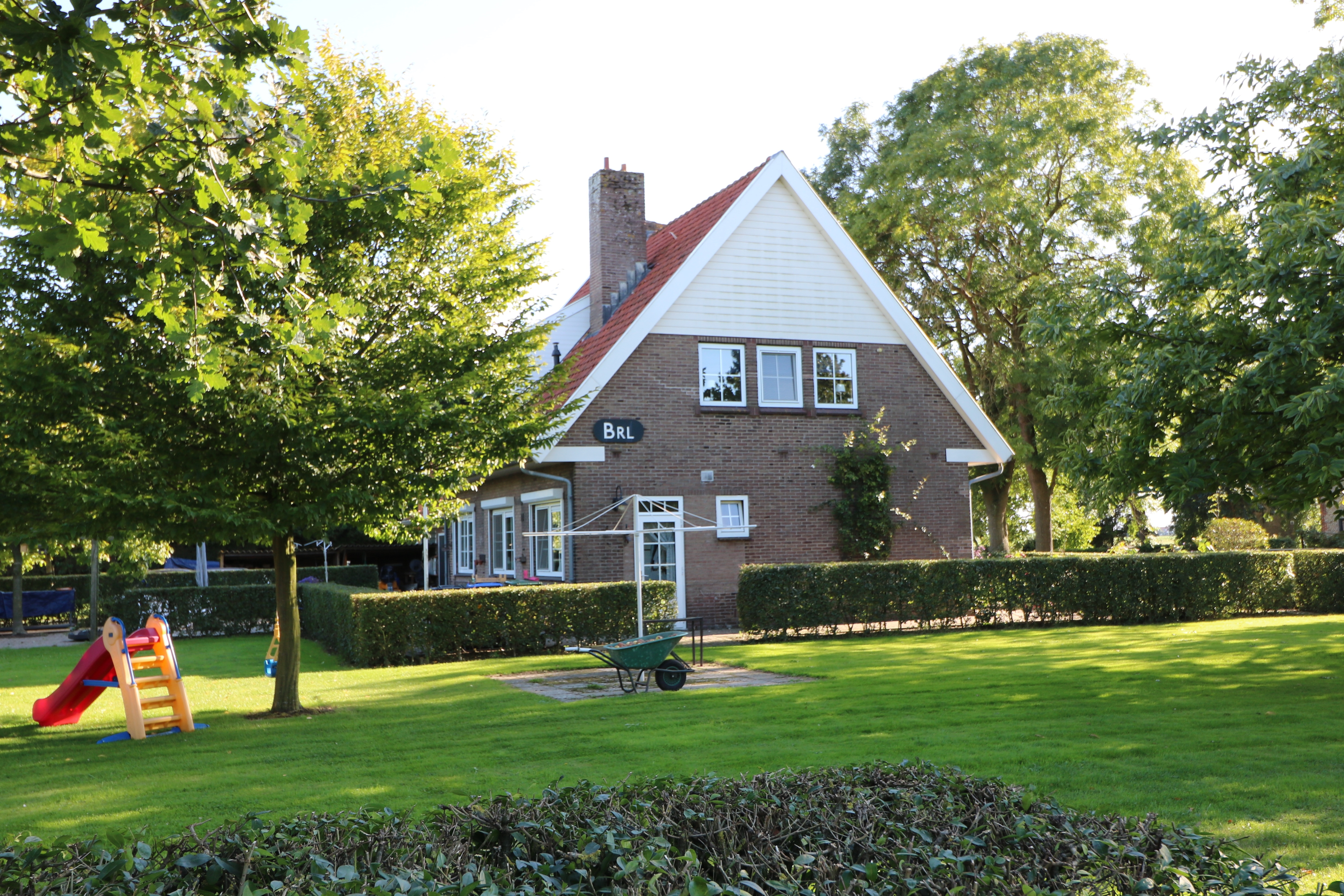
Former railway station

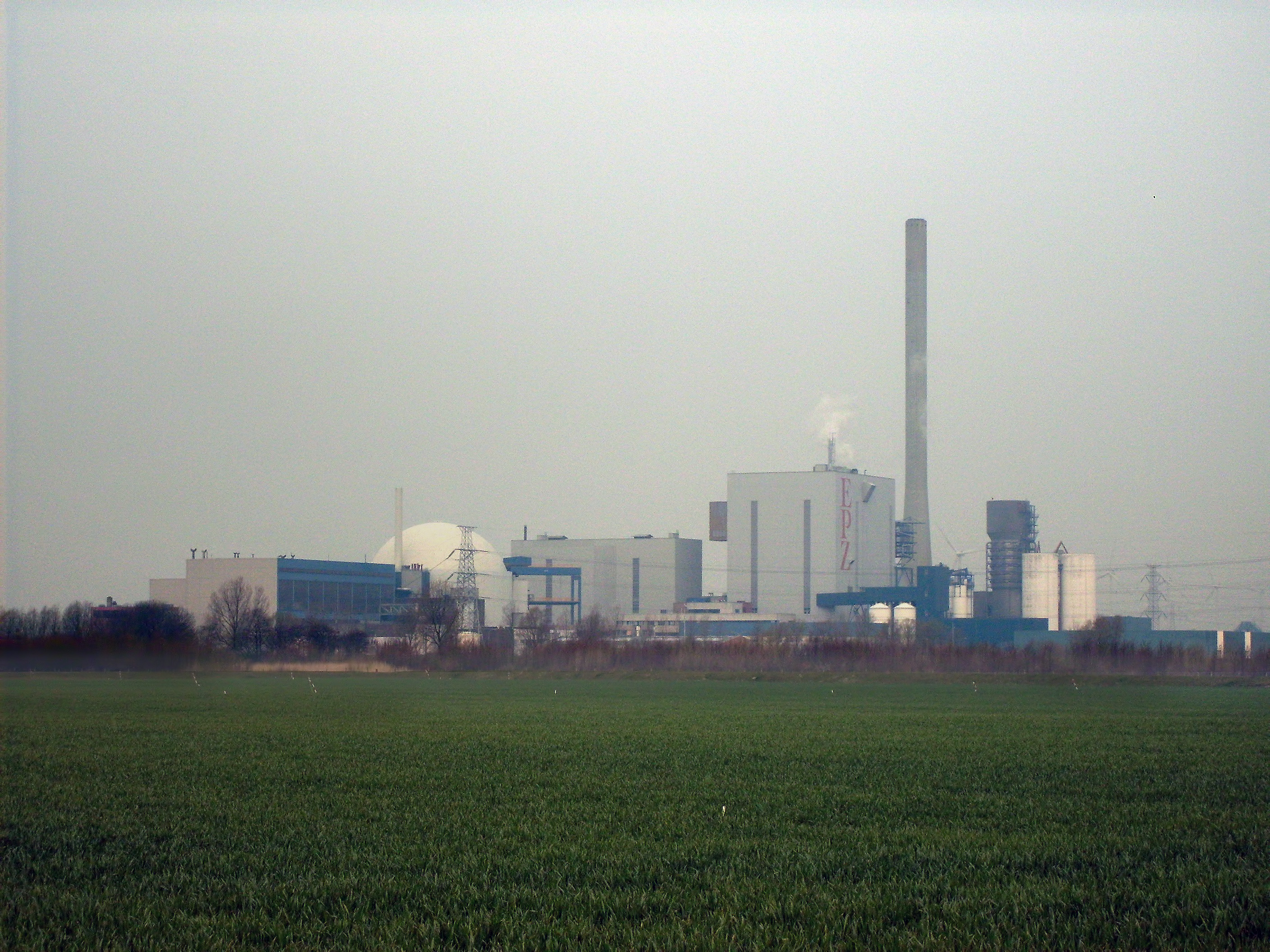
Nuclear power plant
