= Borssele Nuclear Power Station =

Nuclear power plant near Borssele, Netherlands

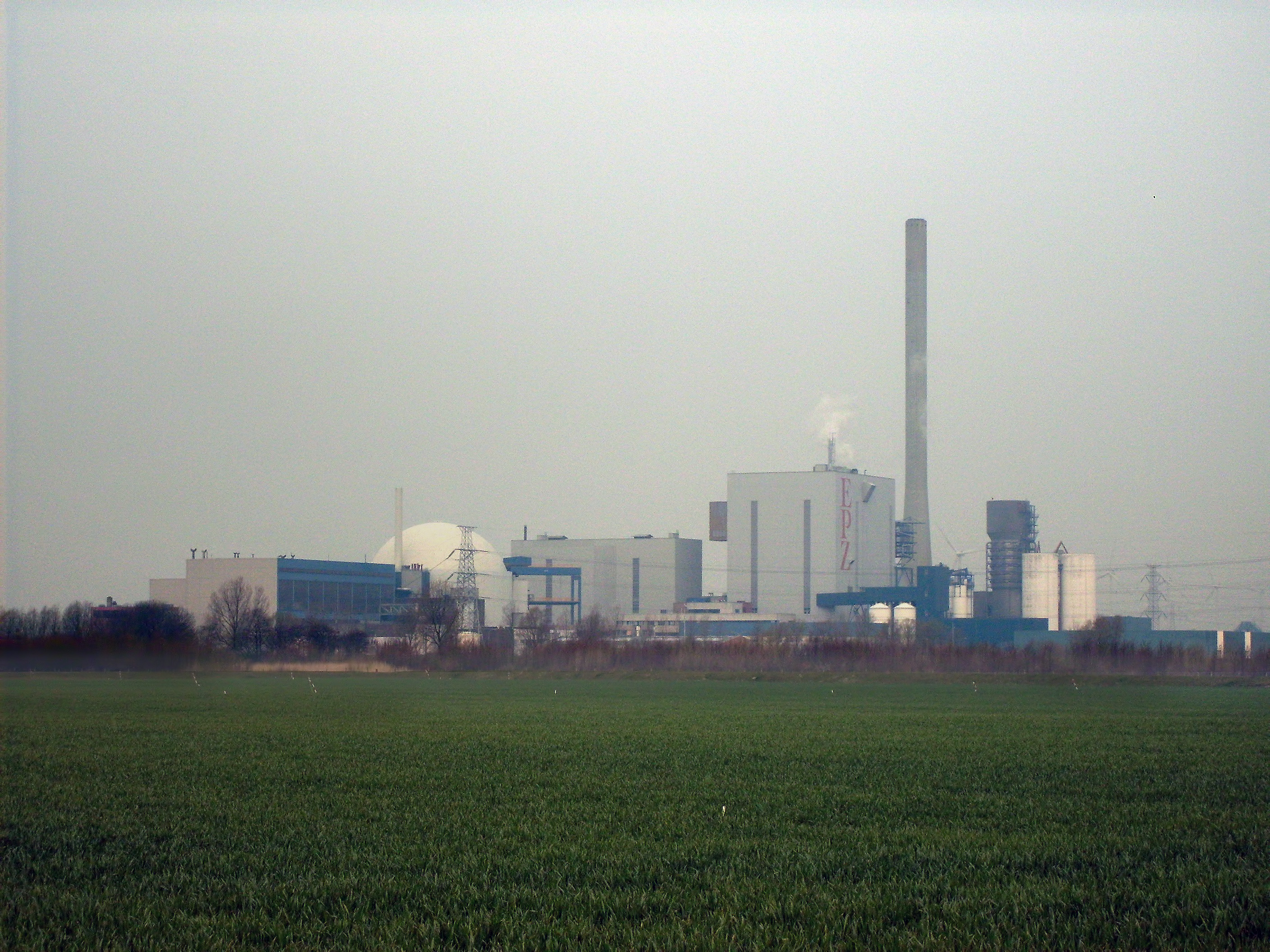
- Borssele NPP in 2011
- Official name: Kerncentrale Borssele
- Country: Netherlands
- Location: Borssele
- Coordinates: 51°25′55″N 3°43′00″E
- Status: Operational
- Construction began: 1969
- Commission date: 26 October 1973
- Owner: EPZ
- Operator: Elektriciteits Produktiemaatschappij Zuid-Nederland (EPZ)

Nuclear power station
- Reactor type: PWR
- Reactor supplier: Siemens KWU

Power generation
- Units operational: 1 x 515 MW
- Nameplate capacity: 515 MW
- Annual net output: 3,273 GWh

External links
- Website: www.epz.nl
- Commons: Related media on Commons

The Borssele Nuclear Power Station (Kerncentrale Borssele) is a nuclear power plant near the Dutch town of Borssele. It has a pressurised water reactor (PWR). Borssele is the only nuclear power plant still operational for electricity production in the Netherlands. Its net output is 485 MWe.

== History ==
The Borssele nuclear power plant was built by Siemens and has been operational since 1973. Originally, it was built primarily to supply relatively cheap electricity to an aluminum smelting facility, opened by French concern Pechiney at a nearby site in 1971, that for many years used two-thirds of the output of the power plant. In 2006, the installation of a new steam turbine increased the original installed power from 449 MW to 485 MW.

== Nuclear fuel ==
In July 2011, Borssele received government permission to burn MOX fuel. Currently, the uranium used by Borssele comes from Kazakhstan.

== Radioactive waste ==
Areva NC reprocesses the spent fissionable material. Part of the deal is that the radioactive waste (i.e. the products of the reprocessing that are not useful) are taken back by the Netherlands.

The Central Organization for Radioactive Waste (COVRA), also in Borssele, is the national storage facility for all radioactive wastes. It is a surface facility suitable for the next 100 years.

Borssele produces around 12 tonnes of high-level waste annually.

The nuclear plant had a long-term contract with the nuclear reprocessing facility in La Hague. This contract ended in 2015. Since 2006, it has been impossible to transport used fuel rods to France because French laws on nuclear fuel have changed. The new law insisted that the nuclear waste should return to the Netherlands within a short period. This required a change in Dutch law as well, but it took 5 years before all new transport permissions were handled by the Council of State, and all questions regarding civilians and all opposition to the transports were addressed correctly. All that time, it was impossible to send spent fuel to France, and the used fuel rods were piling up in the spent fuel pool. Between 2012 and 2015, ten transports were planned, during which 50 per cent more fuel rods than usual were transported by train to La Hague. The reprocessed uranium would be enriched in Russia by mixing it with highly enriched uranium from nuclear-powered submarines that were discarded after the Cold War. A quarter of the uranium would stay in Russia, to be used in nuclear power stations there. The first transport was at 7 June 2011. Although activists tried to delay the transport, the next day the fuel rods arrived in La Hague.

== Controversy ==
Newsreel video showing protest at the Borssele Nuclear Power Station after the Three Mile Island accident (language: Dutch)

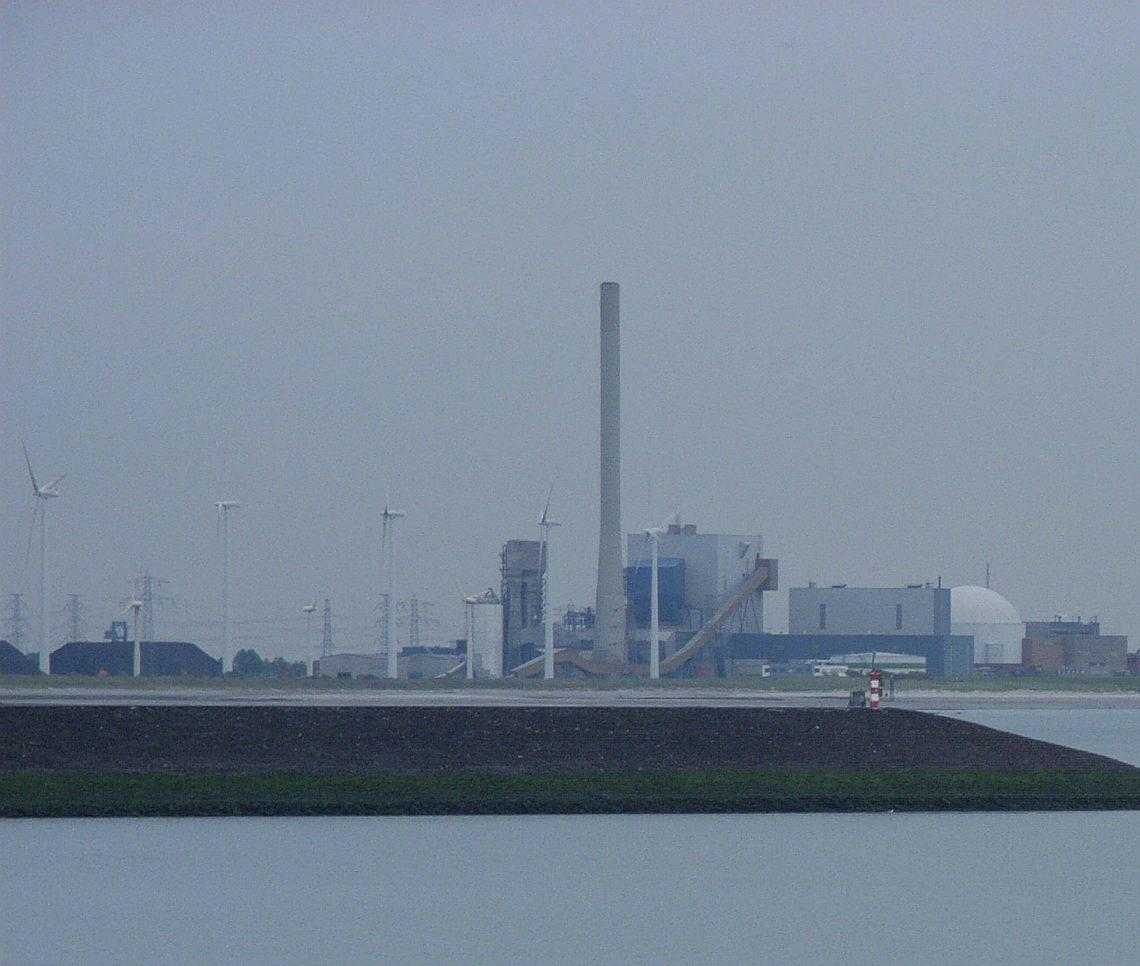
The Borssele Nuclear Power Plant

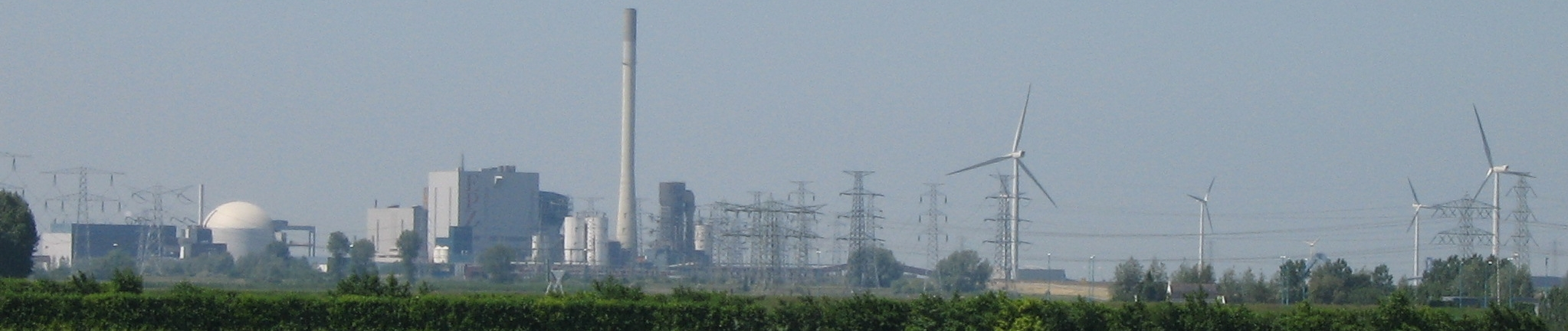
The nuclear power plant

The use of nuclear energy is a controversial issue in Dutch politics. The first commercial nuclear plant in the Netherlands, Dodewaard, was decommissioned in 1997 after only 28 years of service. This decision was taken against the background of political opposition to nuclear energy. In 1994, the government and parliament decided to close down the Borssele plant as of 2004. However, due to legal action by owners and employees of the plant and changes in government policy in 2002, the decommissioning was delayed until 2013, meaning the plant would exactly fulfill its originally intended life span of 40 years.

In recent years, nuclear energy has become less controversial in the Netherlands. It is increasingly viewed as one of many possibilities to reduce carbon emissions and increase national energy self-reliance. As a result, the Dutch government decided in 2006 that Borssele would remain operational until 2033. In June 2006, the government made a contract ("Borssele-convenant") with the owners of the plant, Delta and Essent. Delta and Essent commit themselves to pay €250 million into a 'fonds voor duurzame energie' (fund for the R&D of renewable energy) from the profits generated by the operating time extension.

On December 15, 2021, the new Dutch coalition announced plans to build two new nuclear power plants in the Netherlands. The site for these new plants remains a question for now, but it is possible both could end up in Borssele as Rotterdam wants to focus on hydrogen power and Groningen is considered too controversial by most.

== Unit 2 ==
In 2009, the Dutch utility Delta, which owns 50% of Elektriciteits Produktiemaatschappij Zuid-Nederland (EPZ), submitted a start-up memorandum to the Ministry of Housing, Spatial Planning and the Environment, beginning the process of building a second unit at Borssele. The choice of reactor design for the new project has not been disclosed, although Delta says it expects construction costs to be in the order of €4–5 billion ($6–7 billion). The company said in 2009 that if all goes well, a construction permit application could be submitted in 2012, with a construction start date of 2013, and plant operation in 2018. In January 2012, DELTA announced it was putting the plans for a "Borssele II" on hold for 2 or 3 years.

In June, Delta announced that it would become the majority shareholder of the nuclear power plant in Borssele.

== Incidents ==
In 1996, there was an INES 2–incident at Borssele. Nobody was hurt.

== See also ==
- Dodewaard nuclear power plant
- Petten nuclear reactor
- List of commercial nuclear reactors § Netherlands

== Sources ==
Based on information from the website of the Dutch Ministry of Housing, Spatial Planning, and the Environment and the Energy Research Center of the Netherlands.
