= Workers' Front =

Workers' Front may refer to one of the following:

- Workers' Left Front, Argentina
- Botswana Workers Front
- Workers' Front of Catalonia
- Workers' Front (Croatia)
- Workers' Front (Spain)
- Galician Workers Front
- Workers Front for Indochina
- Frente Obrero (Spanish for 'Workers' Front'), Nicaragua
