= Karlskrona =

Place in Blekinge, Sweden

- Locality
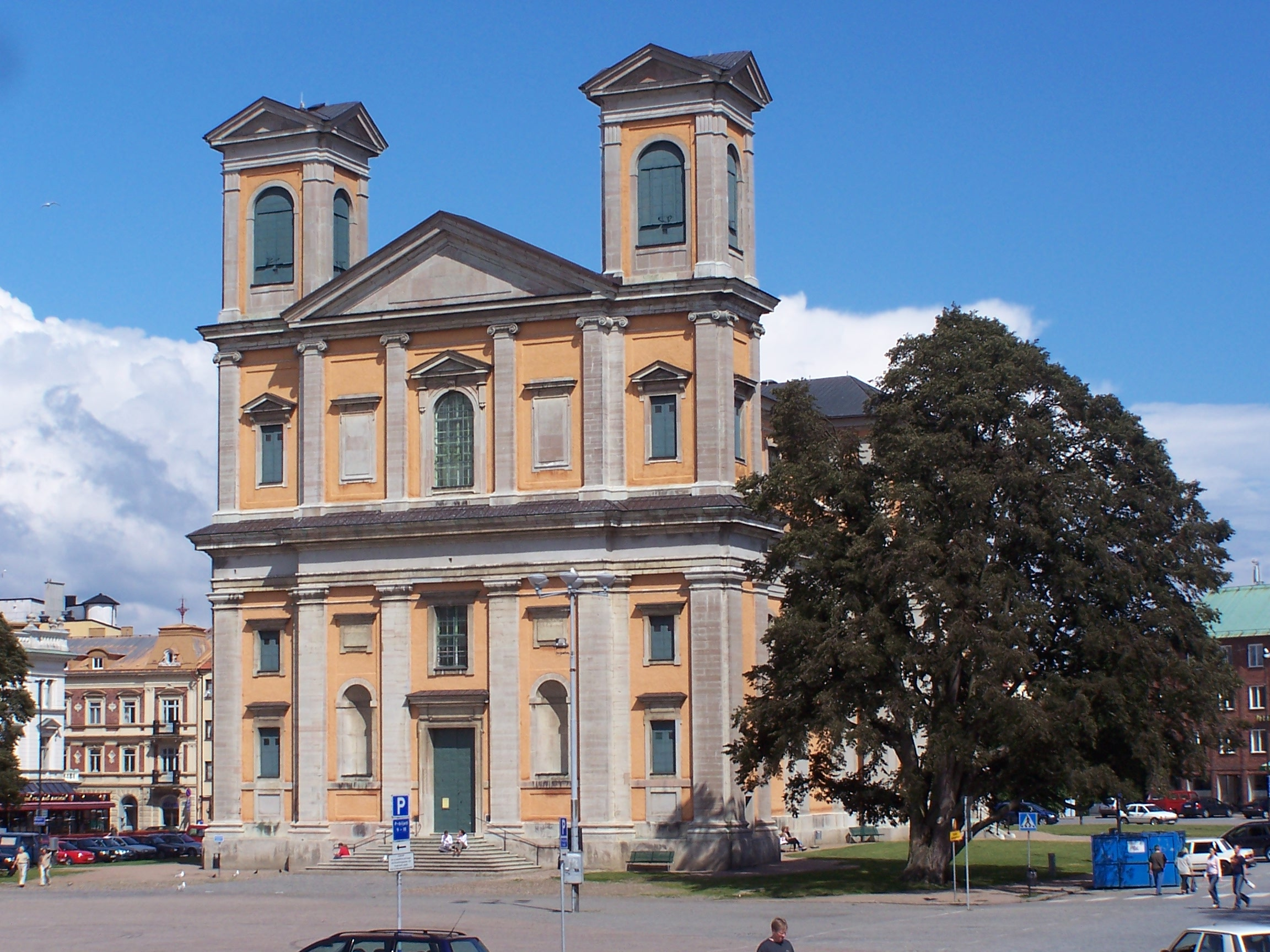
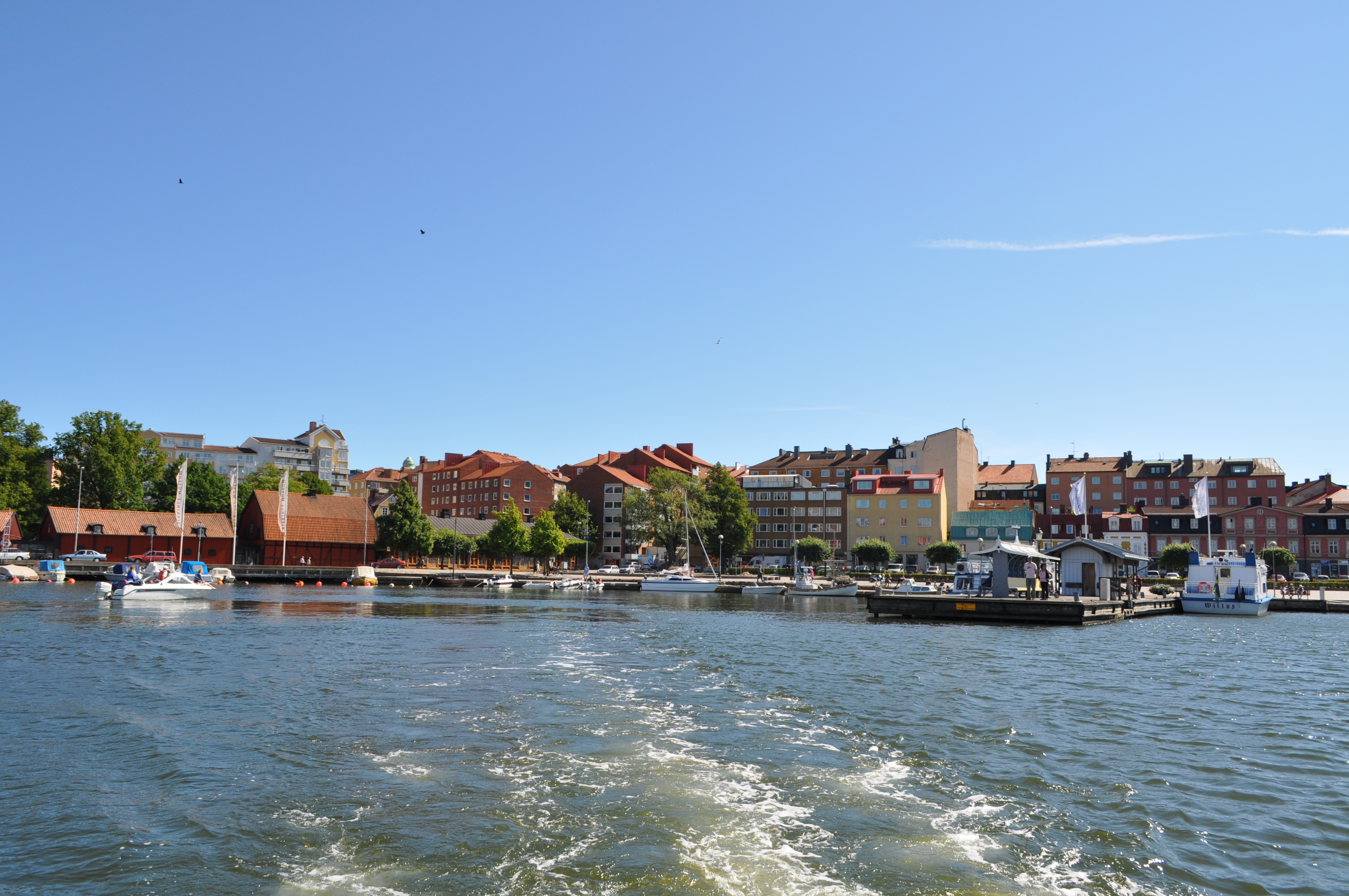
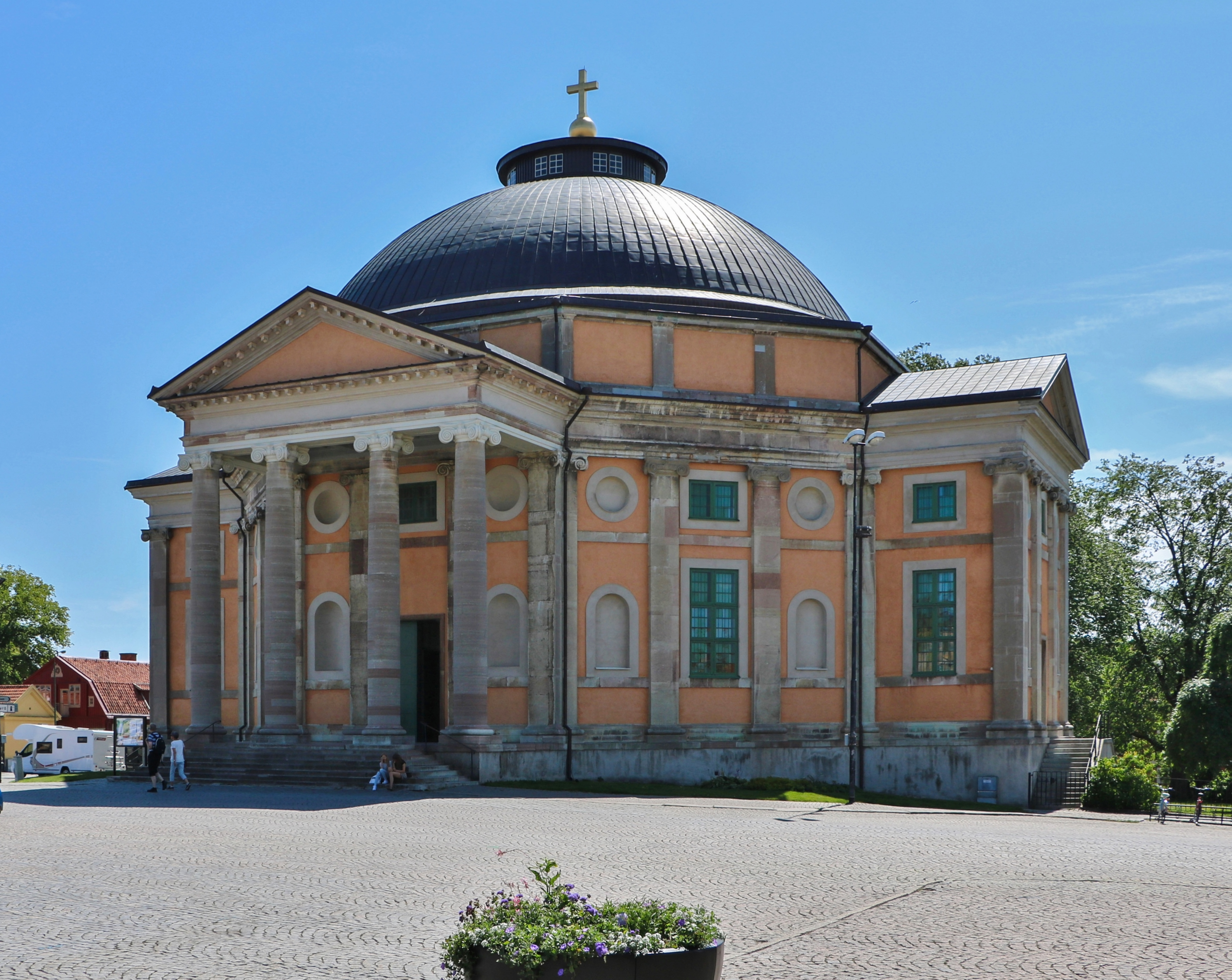
- Clockwise from top: Aerial view of Karlskrona; Fredrik Church; Fiskbron; Trinity Church

- Coat of arms

- Location within Blekinge Location within Sweden
- Coordinates: 56°9′39″N 15°35′10″E
- Country: Sweden
- Province: Blekinge
- County: Blekinge County
- Municipality: Karlskrona Municipality
- Charter: 1680

Area
  - Total: 21.72 km^{2} (8.39 sq mi)
- Elevation: 16 m (52 ft)
  - Density: 1,621/km^{2} (4,200/sq mi)
- Time zone: UTC+1 (CET)
  - Summer (DST): UTC+2 (CEST)
- Postal code: 371 xx
- Area code: (+46) 455
- Website: www.karlskrona.se

UNESCO World Heritage Site
- Official name: Naval Port of Karlskrona
- Includes: 1. Karlskrona and the Island of Trossö; 2. Mjölnarholmen; 3. Koholmen; 4. Kungshall (Basareholmen); 5. Godnatt; 6. Kurrholmen; 7. Ljungskär; 8. Crown Mill at Lyckeby (Kronokvarnen); 9. Kungsholms Fort (Kungsholmen); 10. Drottningskärs Citadel (Kastellet); 11. Skärva
- Criteria: Cultural: (ii)(iv)
- Reference: 871
- Inscription: 1998 (22nd Session)
- Area: 320.417 ha (1.23714 sq mi)
- Buffer zone: 1,105.077 ha (4.26673 sq mi)

Karlskrona (UK: /ˈkɑːrlskroʊnə/, US: /kɑːrlzˈkruːnə/, Swedish: [kaɭsˈkrûːna]) is a locality and the seat of Karlskrona Municipality, Blekinge County, Sweden with a population of 66,675 in 2018. It is also the capital of Blekinge County. Karlskrona is known as Sweden's only baroque city and is host to Sweden's largest naval base and the headquarters of the Swedish Coast Guard.

Historically, the city has been home to a German minority, thus enabling the formation of a German Congregational church. It also counted Jewish people in its population.

In 1998, parts of the city, including the Karlskrona Naval Base, were declared a UNESCO World Heritage Site.

== History ==
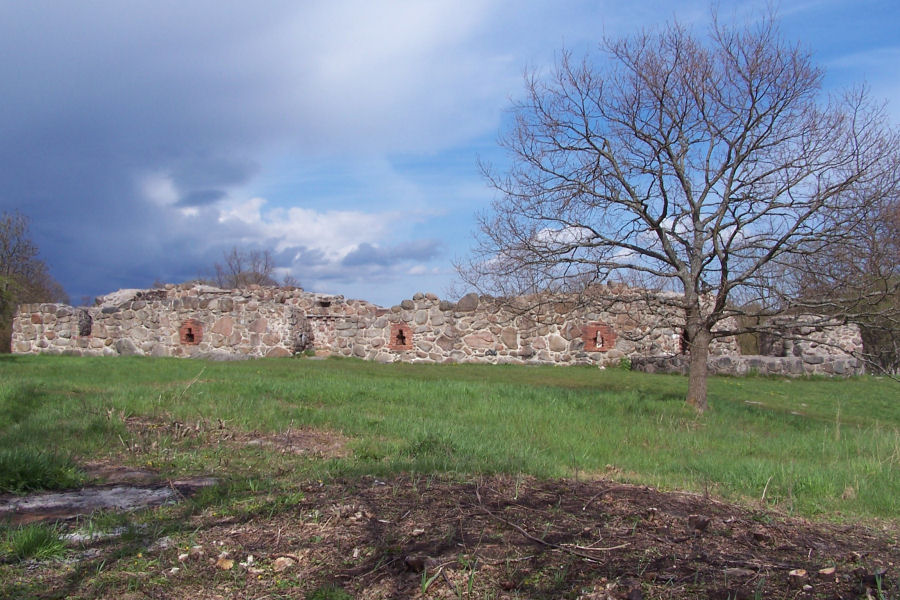
The ruins of Lyckeby Castle in northeastern Karlskrona.

Under Danish rule, the island on which Karlskrona was built, Trossö, was used chiefly for farming and grazing. During the 16th century, it was owned by the farmer Offe Månsson. A couple of kilometers away on the mainland there was another, older town called Lyckeby or Lyckå (today a city district of Karlskrona). In 1599, King Christian IV of Denmark founded a new town, Kristianopel, a little further away. Lyckeby lost its town privileges which were transferred to the new town, and Lyckeby Castle was torn down.

At the Treaty of Roskilde in 1658 during the Second Northern War, Blekinge fell under Swedish rule. In the subsequent years, the Swedish government developed plans to relocate most of the Royal Swedish Navy from the Stockholm area to a more southerly location. At the time Sweden was the dominant military power in the Baltic Sea region, but needed a better strategic location for its navy, as the Swedish fleet tended to get stuck in the ice during winter while located close to Stockholm. It was therefore decided to move it to an ice-free location in the newly conquered province, which also offered a very strategic position against Denmark, and with short sailing distances to Sweden's German and Baltic provinces.

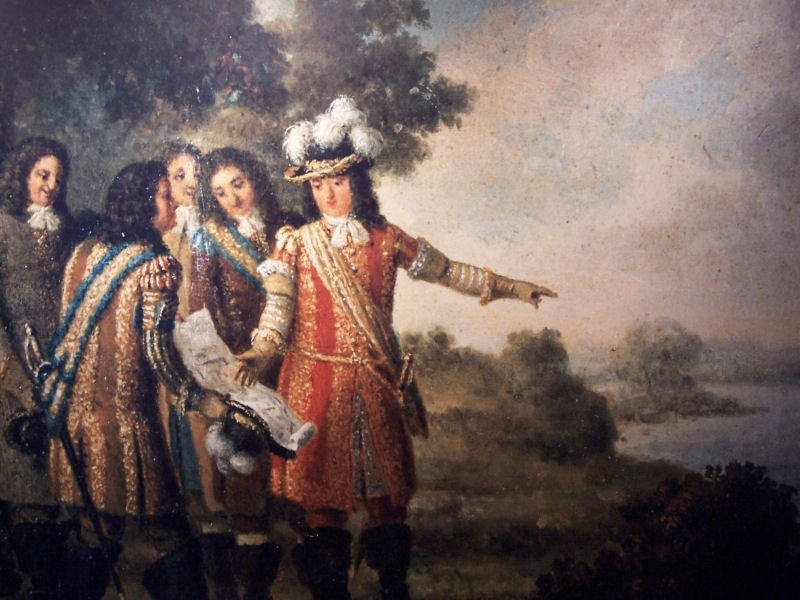
Painting showing the Swedish King Charles XI pointing out the place for "Carls-Croona".

It was decided to base most of the kingdom's fleet on Trossö where a new naval base and city were to be constructed. The location was strategically advantageous on an island in the archipelago with control over the link to the mainland and surrounded by islets where fortifications were erected to protect the naval base. Until 1679, the island and the nearby islets were owned by the farmer Vittus Andersson; he was forced to sell his properties to the Swedish crown. The same year work on relocating the navy from the Stockholm area to Trossö begun.

The city itself was founded on 10 August 1680. The city's name means Karl's Crown in honour of King Karl XI of Sweden, the name being inspired by the name of the older city of Landskrona in Scania. The nearby town of Ronneby was dissolved as a town and its population forced to move to Karlskrona which benefited from several years of customs freedom. Shipbuilders for the shipyards of the new naval base were brought in from Ostrobothnia and Stockholm.

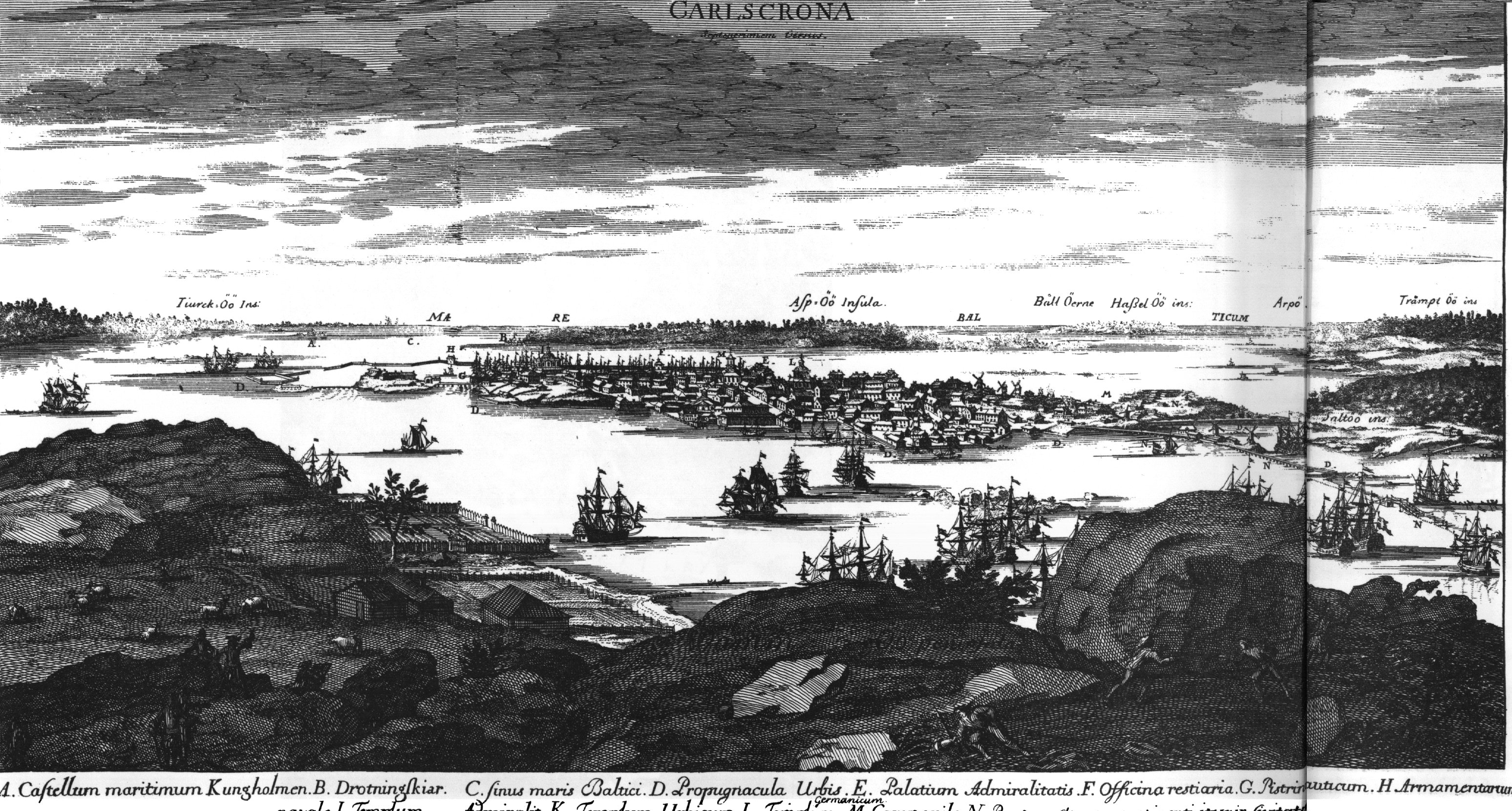
Karlskrona c. 1700. From Suecia antiqua et hodierna.

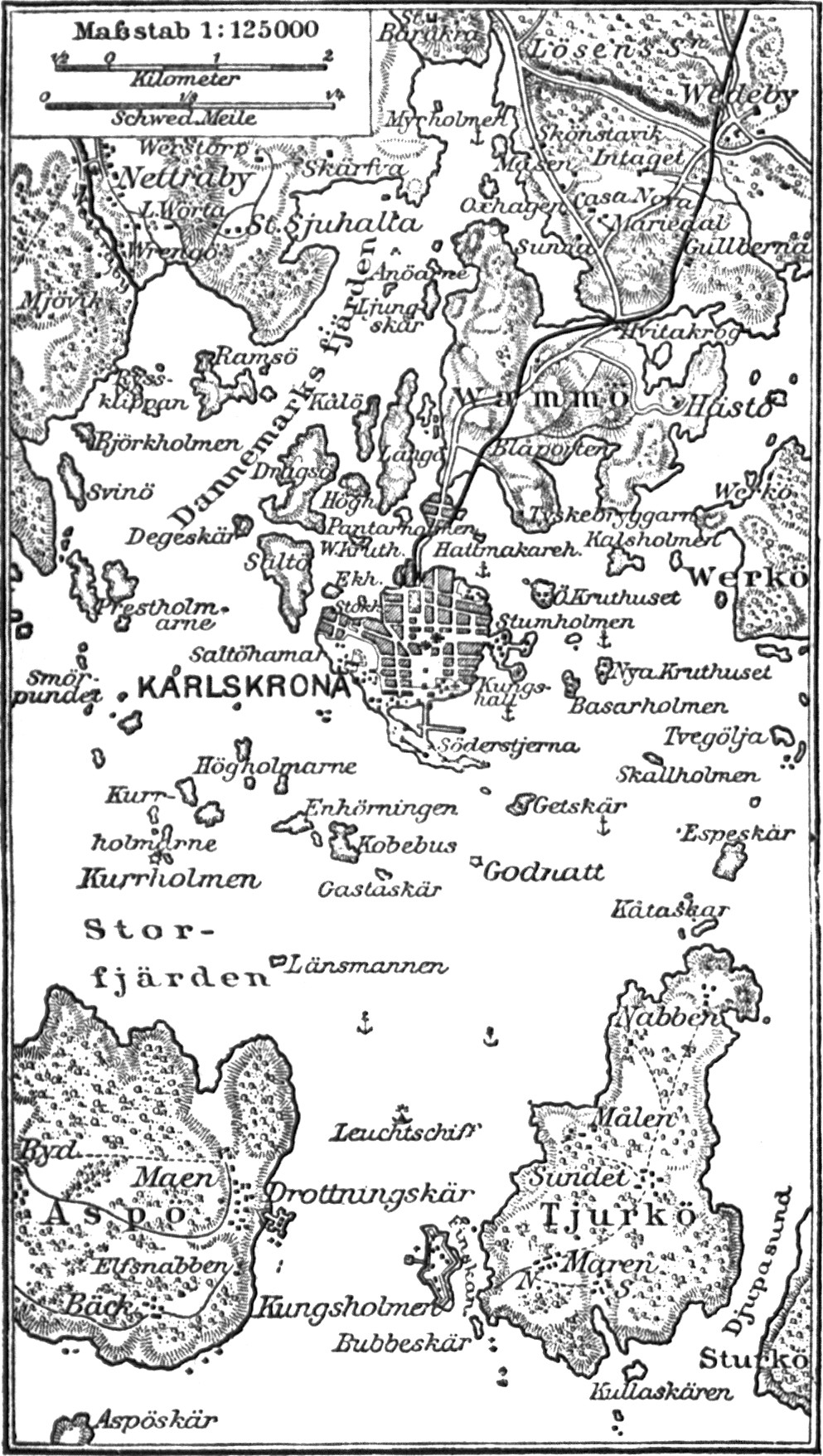
Historic Map

In 1682, bridges were built that connected the city center with the mainland. The first city plan, drawn up in 1683 by Erik Dahlbergh, Hans Wachtmeister and Carl Magnus Stuart, shows Karlskrona as a pure fortress. The 1694 plan by Erik Dahlberg, which was later followed, also provided space for urban development. The city grew quickly and by 1750 Karlskrona had about 10,000 inhabitants. It was then one of the biggest cities in the country and soon became the kingdom's third largest city, after Riga and Stockholm. Most of the baroque buildings from this era are still standing, which is why the city centre is architecturally uniform.

The shipyard in Karlskrona was established almost at the same time as the city. It was a necessity because of the heavy losses the Swedish navy had suffered in 1659. In 1711, the shipyard was Sweden's largest industrial employer with 1,100 workers. The oldest dock, the Polhem dock, is cut in the cliff itself and is still in use. It got its name from Christopher Polhem ("The Swedish da Vinci", a scientist with several inventions still in use). There is also a historical rope making factory, Repslagarbanan.

Karlskrona developed rapidly, but in the early 18th century stagnation occurred due to war and plagues. In the years 1701 to 1711 about 7,000 people died when the plague struck the city. In 1741 and 1789, the city was again hit by plagues, each claiming 6,000 lives.

When Karlskrona, as a military-closed port city, slowly withered away in step with the Swedish great power, the growth slowed, with the city losing much of its former glory, but it has nevertheless retained its position as a strong naval base. That Karlskrona was intended as a future capital of a great power is noticeable mainly in its central parts where Stortorget follows the ideals of the time for what Europe's great power cities would look like. With its large open piazza where the church, town hall and state administration are located in the outer edges of the square, it follows the baroque pattern. The number of churches and state administration castles also shows the city's intended task. The large military area and the shipyard show that Karlskrona, as the kingdom's southern gate, was long considered a very important city to defend. Even today, operations are conducted at Karlskronavarvet. Karlskrona was thus intended to take over Stockholm's place as the kingdom's capital, but these plans were never realized.

During the years 1910 — 1949, there was electric tram traffic from Amiralitetsgatan in the south to Bergåsa in the north.

The city has kept its street structure since its foundation. Since the streets all follow a grid pattern the winds can blow freely from the sea right into the heart of the city.

Parts of the city (mainly the Naval Port) have been declared a UNESCO World Heritage Site.

In October 1981 the Whiskey-class Soviet submarine S-363 (known as "U137" in Sweden) ran aground in the archipelago near Sturkö just outside Karlskrona. The media characterized it as the "Whiskey on the Rocks" affair. The incident caused a temporary rise in tensions between Sweden and the Soviet Union. While the submarine's grounding was inadvertent, and likely the result of inebriation among the crew, the submarine almost certainly was engaged in an unspecified covert mission at the time.

== Geography ==
The city of Karlskrona is spread over 30 islands in the eastern part of Blekinge archipelago, Trossö being the main one. Other populated mentionable islands are Saltö, Sturkö, Hästö, Långö and Aspö. The islet of Stumholmen was formerly property of the Navy and today it houses the National Naval Museum (Marinmuseum). Outside the city lies the archipelago of Karlskrona, the most southern of the Swedish archipelagos. Several islands are connected to the city by ferries.

=== Climate ===
According to the Köppen climate classification, Karlskrona has a four season warm-summer Mediterranean climate (Csb). Barely fulfilling the precipitation criteria, the climate can best be classified as a hybrid between Oceanic and Cold semi-arid (Cfb/BSk) with dry-spring/early-summers and wet winters.

Due to its location in the rain shadow of the South Swedish highlands, Karlskrona has one of the driest and sunniest climates in all of Sweden. Only rivaled by island locales. The precipitation pattern of a drying summer, can easily be found elsewhere in North American locales such as Skagway, Soldotna, or even inland Flagstaff. In comparison with other well-known warm-summer Mediterranean areas such as the Pacific Northwest or Northwestern Iberia, Karlskrona has a relatively dry climate with annual sunshine hours matching – or even exceeding – famous cities such as Seattle or A Coruña. Tourists often flock to the city during summer for guaranteed summer sunshine. Summer sunshine-values is in direct competition with traditionally Mediterranean cities such as Rome, Nice, Lisbon, or even Madrid. Humidity however, remains high throughout the entire year, partly due to the constant winds blowing in from the sea. Long lasting snow cover is uncommon. Snow usually melts within the first few days of falling.

Thanks to its coastal position on the south coast of Sweden right by the Baltic Sea, Karlskrona experiences relatively speaking mild weather year round with a strong seasonal lag. Spring begins during March and is often accompanied by sunny and drying weather. Drought-like conditions are not unheard of. For instance, March 2022 experienced as little as 1 mm of rain. This precipitation pattern continues well into early-summer passing through April where precipitation generally reaches its minimum. Summer days are often sunny, which starts during May and extends into September, with daytime highs near 20 °C. Around the summer solstice, westerly winds begin picking up resulting in sporadic rain-showers lasting throughout summer. In accordance with Karlskrona’s poleward location, day time hours quickly dwindle during October resulting in grey overcast skies lasting until the end of February. Even so, autumn is often mild with temperatures significantly warmer than further inland. This mild weather often extends well into the winter months with December lows exceeding freezing. January and February is often coldest time of the year with plenty of precipitation and chilly damp winds. Thanks to mild winter temperatures, Karlskrona lies gardening-zone 1. According to the USDA hardiness zones in zone 8b (9a 2010-present). However, lack of summer heat creates unfavorable environments for heat-demanding plants, that is a climate pattern seen across large areas of Northwestern Europe.

Following the record breaking hot July 2018, a dew point of 24,8 °C was recorded during 1 August 2018. The highest ever recorded in Sweden.

Climate data for Karlskrona-Söderstjerna, (2021-present normals, (Note: Mean monthly maxima and minima)Extremes 2010-present
Month	Jan	Feb	Mar	Apr	May	Jun	Jul	Aug	Sep	Oct	Nov	Dec	Year
Record high °C (°F)	9.8 (49.6)	13.8 (56.8)	18.7 (65.7)	19.6 (67.3)	26.4 (79.5)	28.7 (83.7)	30.6 (87.1)	29.6 (85.3)	25.0 (77.0)	18.2 (64.8)	15.6 (60.1)	11.7 (53.1)	30.6 (87.1)
Mean maximum °C (°F)	8 (46)	9.1 (48.4)	10.7 (51.3)	16.3 (61.3)	20.1 (68.2)	25.2 (77.4)	25.5 (77.9)	24.5 (76.1)	22.2 (72.0)	16.6 (61.9)	13.1 (55.6)	9.1 (48.4)	25.5 (77.9)
Mean daily maximum °C (°F)	3.9 (39.0)	4 (39)	6.1 (43.0)	9.8 (49.6)	14.8 (58.6)	19.7 (67.5)	21 (70)	20.5 (68.9)	18.2 (64.8)	13 (55)	7.8 (46.0)	4.9 (40.8)	12.0 (53.5)
Daily mean °C (°F)	2.1 (35.8)	1.9 (35.4)	3.8 (38.8)	7 (45)	11.9 (53.4)	16.8 (62.2)	18.4 (65.1)	17.9 (64.2)	15.7 (60.3)	11 (52)	7.8 (46.0)	3.1 (37.6)	9.8 (49.7)
Mean daily minimum °C (°F)	0.2 (32.4)	−0.2 (31.6)	1.4 (34.5)	4.2 (39.6)	9 (48)	13.9 (57.0)	15.8 (60.4)	15.3 (59.5)	13.2 (55.8)	8.9 (48.0)	4.4 (39.9)	1.2 (34.2)	7.3 (45.1)
Mean minimum °C (°F)	−6.5 (20.3)	−6.2 (20.8)	−2.9 (26.8)	−0.8 (30.6)	4.2 (39.6)	9.9 (49.8)	13.3 (55.9)	11.3 (52.3)	7.8 (46.0)	3.5 (38.3)	−4.7 (23.5)	−6.3 (20.7)	−6.5 (20.3)
Record low °C (°F)	−11.7 (10.9)	−12.8 (9.0)	−9 (16)	−4 (25)	−5.7 (21.7)	6.4 (43.5)	10.8 (51.4)	9.8 (49.6)	3.3 (37.9)	−0.2 (31.6)	−7.4 (18.7)	−12 (10)	−12.8 (9.0)
Average precipitation mm (inches)	41.1 (1.62)	27.8 (1.09)	15.1 (0.59)	11.8 (0.46)	26.6 (1.05)	38.4 (1.51)	61.1 (2.41)	44 (1.7)	52.1 (2.05)	37.7 (1.48)	38.4 (1.51)	31.3 (1.23)	425.4 (16.7)
Average precipitation days (≥ 0.1 mm)	16.6	12.6	9.2	7.8	12	9.2	12.2	10.4	10.6	13.8	15.2	14.8	144.4
Average relative humidity (%)	87.8	83.4	78.6	69.8	68.8	72.8	78.2	77	78	83	87.5	89	79.5
Mean monthly sunshine hours	56	93	177	245	313	343	310	267	198	128	49	38	2,217
Mean daily daylight hours	7.6	9.5	11.8	14.2	16.3	17.5	17	15.1	12.8	10.5	8.3	7	12.3
Percentage possible sunshine	24	35	48	58	62	65	59	57	51	39	20	17	30
Average ultraviolet index	1	2	3	5	6	7	7	6	5	3	1	1	4
Source 1: SMHI Open Data(Temperature & Precipitation)
Source 2: Weather Atlas(daylight) Nomadseason(UV)

Climate data for Karlskrona
Month	Jan	Feb	Mar	Apr	May	Jun	Jul	Aug	Sep	Oct	Nov	Dec	Year
Maximum sea temperature °C (°F)	5.5	3.6	5.8	11.7	13.4	16.6	22.3	20.6	19.6	13.9	10.4	6.7	
Average sea temperature °C	3.7	2.3	4.1	8.3	11.2	15	18.6	18.5	17.2	11.8	8.2	5.5	
SMHI Open Data(Sea Temperature)

== Culture and heritages ==
The most important day in Karlskrona is the day before midsummer's eve. On that day a big fair takes place and attracts tens of thousands to visit Karlskrona. The fair is called Lövmarknaden (The Leaf Fair) and is very popular among the locals.

The main square of Karlskrona is the biggest in Scandinavia.

Every year in late July/early August a popular festival called The Sail takes place in the harbor of Karlskrona. Usually it is a place where families go to have something to eat and drink, and perhaps watch the sailing boats lined up at the pier. During the sail, the sea scouts of Karlskrona will row a boat carrying torches along the docks while playing the national anthems for the visiting ships.

Lately The Sail has been replaced with a festival called Skärgårdsfest.

The old architecture together with the naval installations comprise the major tourist attractions of Karlskrona.

=== Architectural Heritage ===
Karlskrona has preserved its buildings and its layout virtually intact since its foundation.

When the city was founded in 1680, it was primarily thought of as a military city, with many defenses and fortifications exploiting the particular topography of the city. Some fortifications were located on the main island (Trossö) such as the Bastion Aurora, built at the beginning of the 18th century, but much of it was located on the nearby islands (Ljungskär, Mjölnareholmen, Godnatt, Koholmen and Kurrholmen) or more distant, such as the islands closing the bay, with in particular the important fortress of Kungsholmen and its circular port.

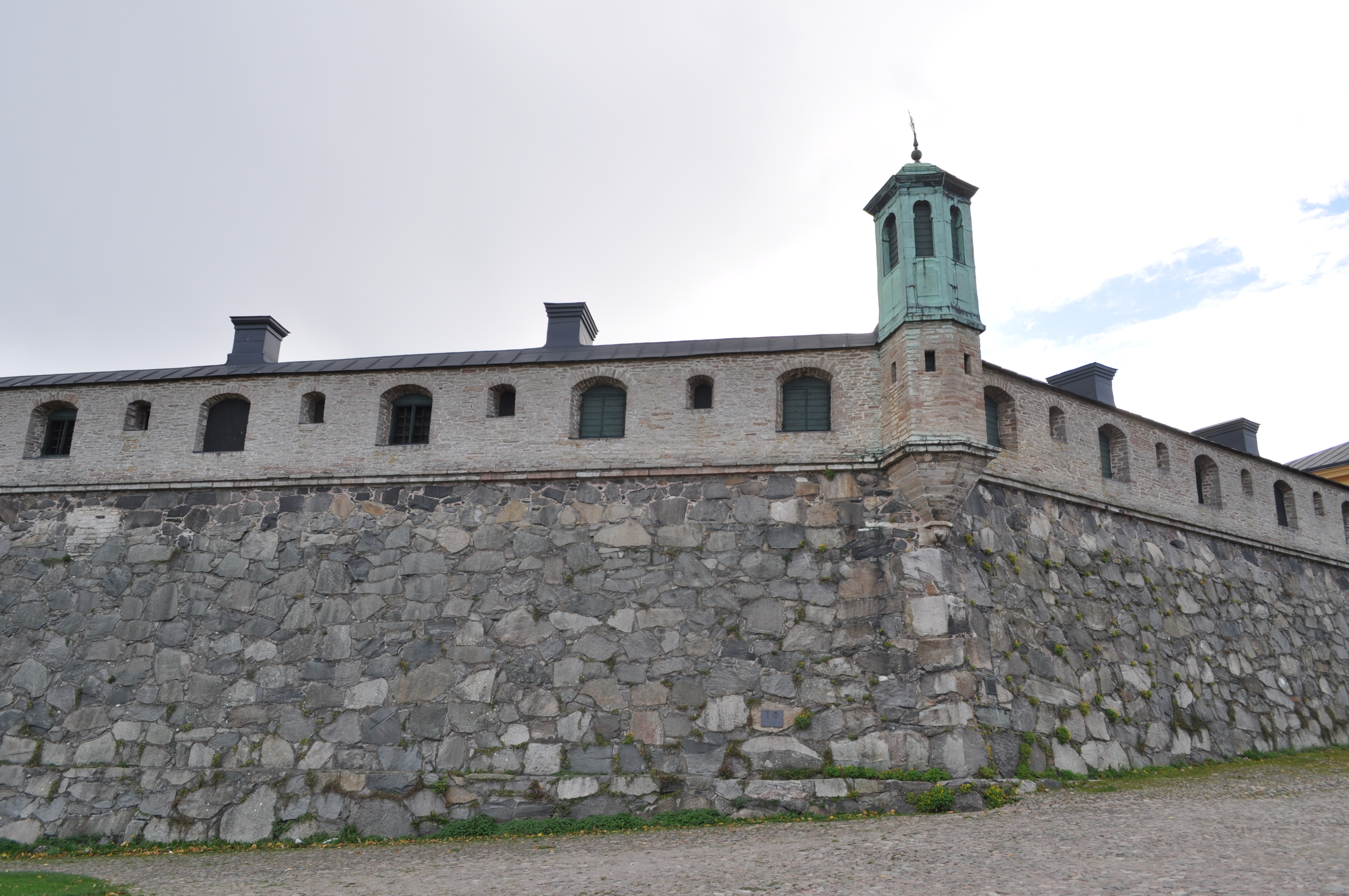
Bastion Aurora

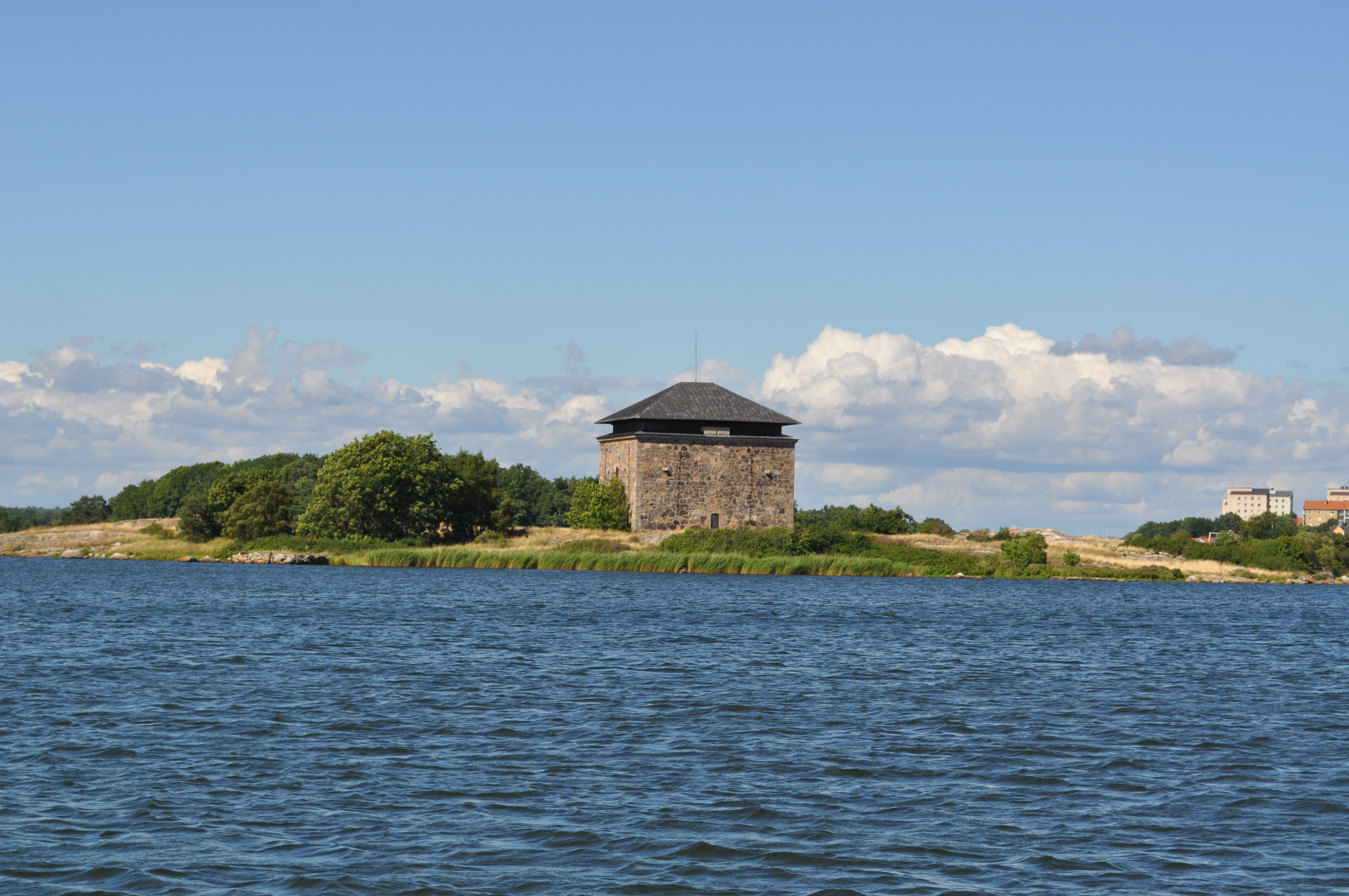
Västra kruthuset

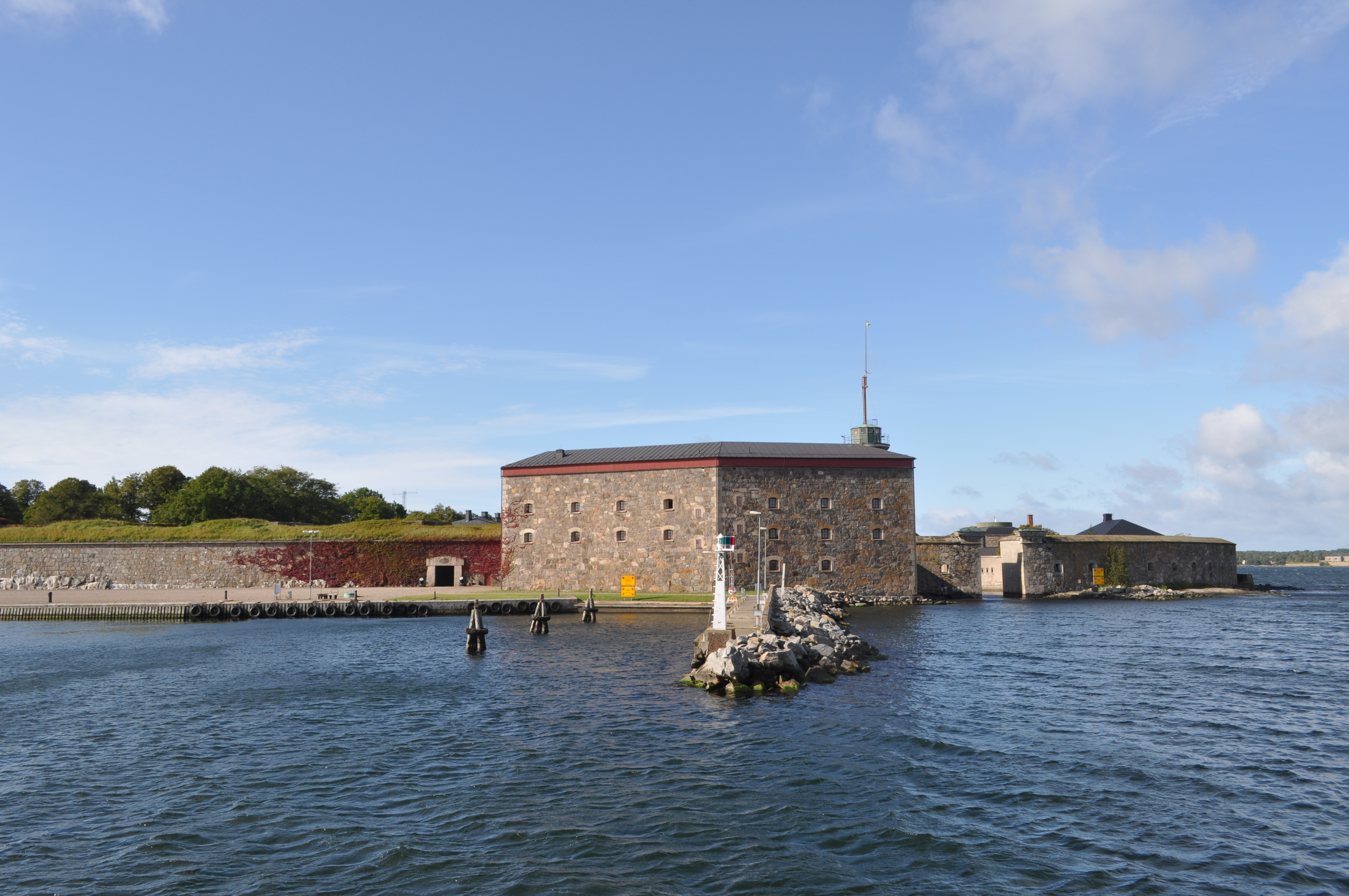
The Kungsholmen fort

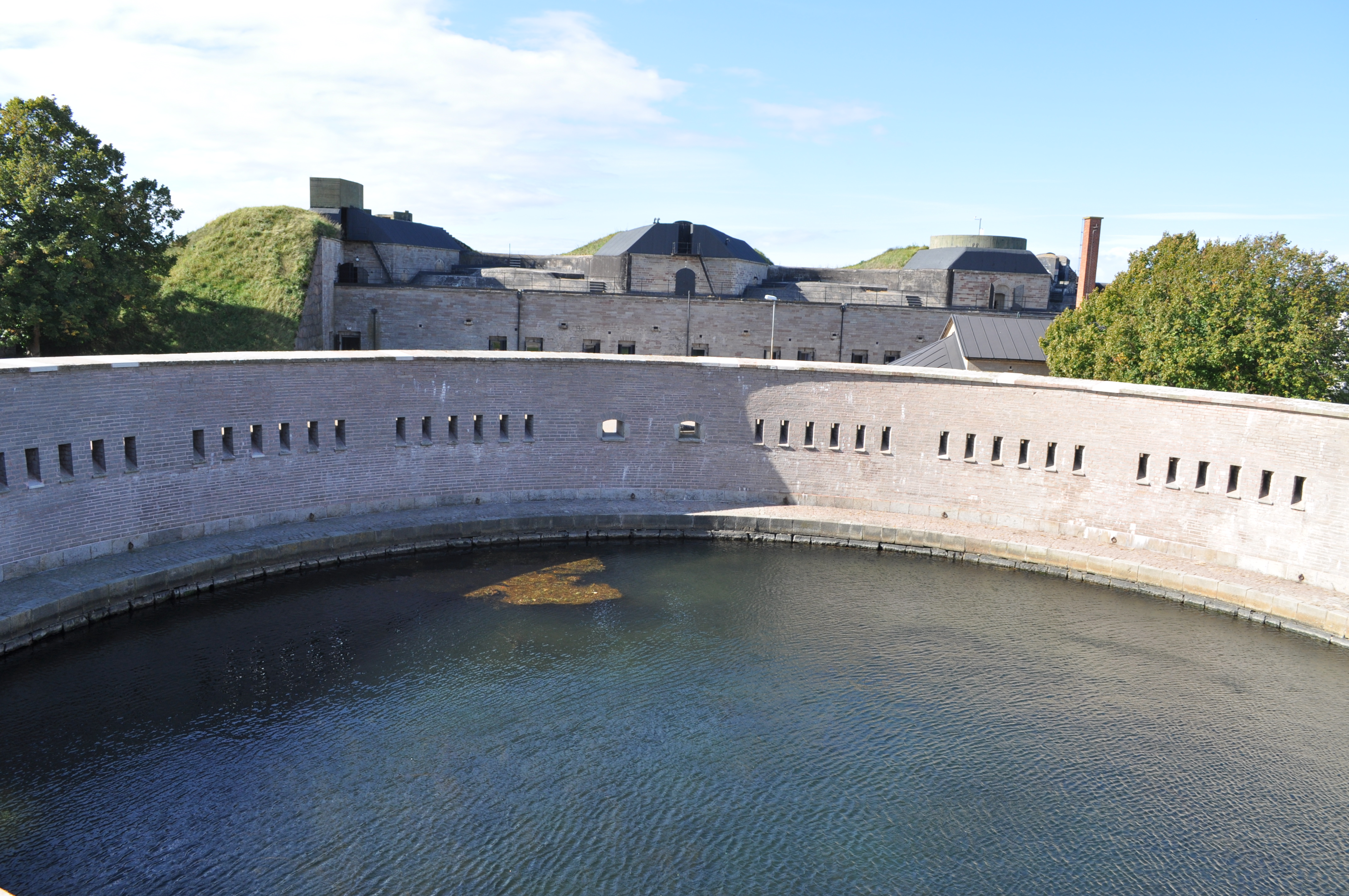
The circular harbor of Kungsholmen

But the civil part of the city was also carefully planned. It has a rectangular grid plan, with however some diagonal streets, created because of the relief of the city center. Nicodème Tessin l'Ancien was responsible for the design of the buildings, and he gave the city a very uniform baroque style.

The central building of the city is the Fredrikskyrkan church, built in the 1690s, On the main square, which is also the highest point of the island. Several other churches are located in the city, such as the Church of the Holy Trinity, built for the Germans of the city in 1709, or the Amiralitetskyrkan, consecrated in 1685

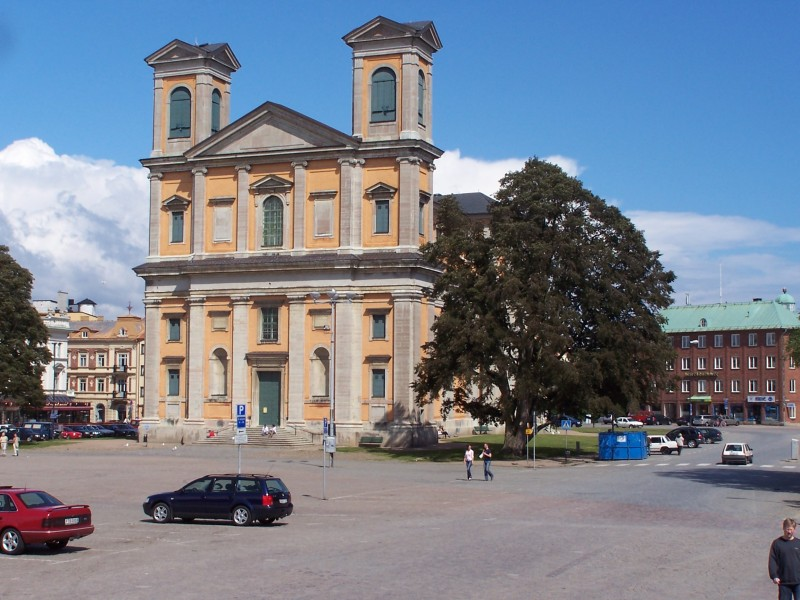
The Fredrikskyrkan Church

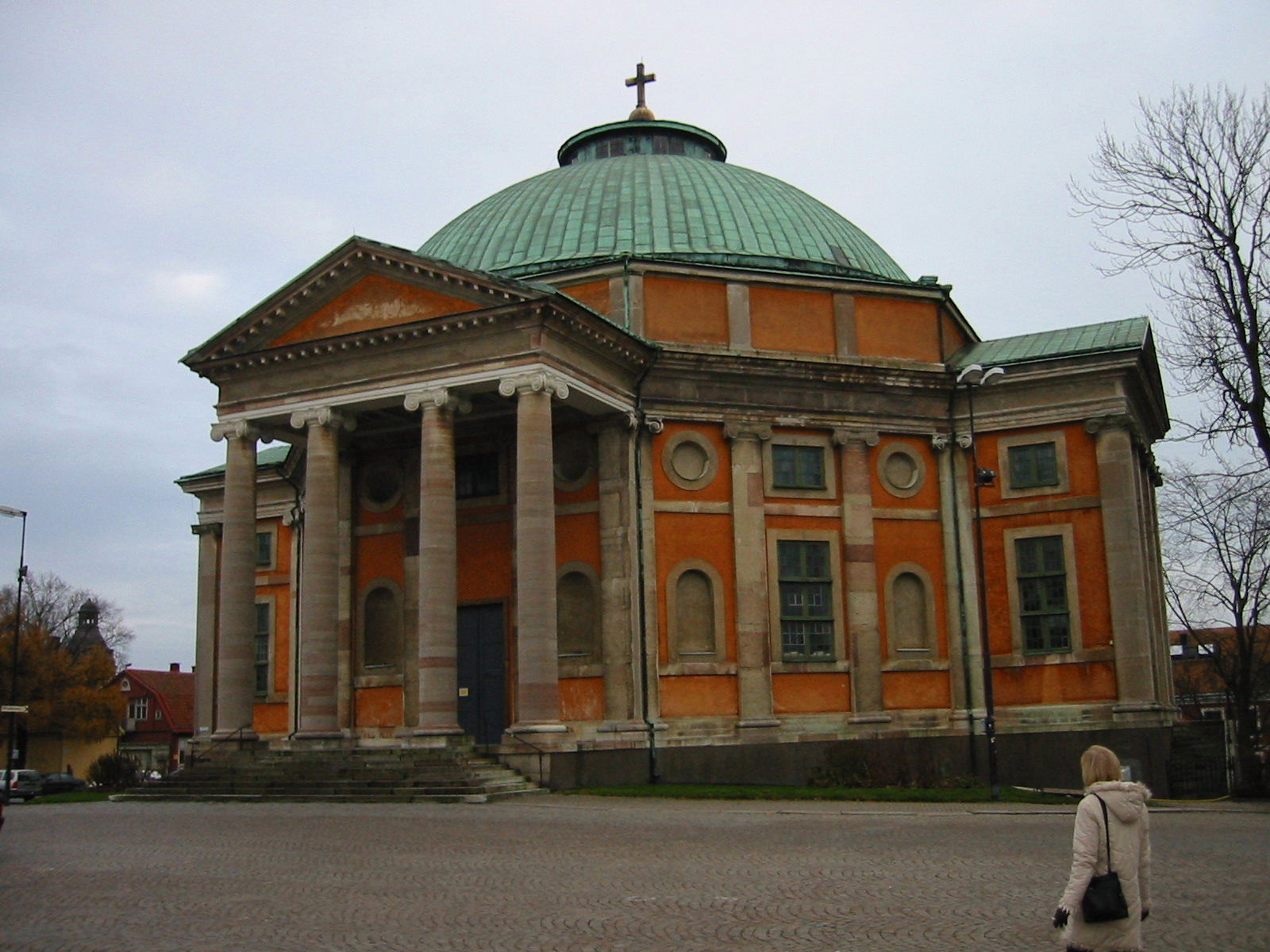
Church of the Holy Trinity

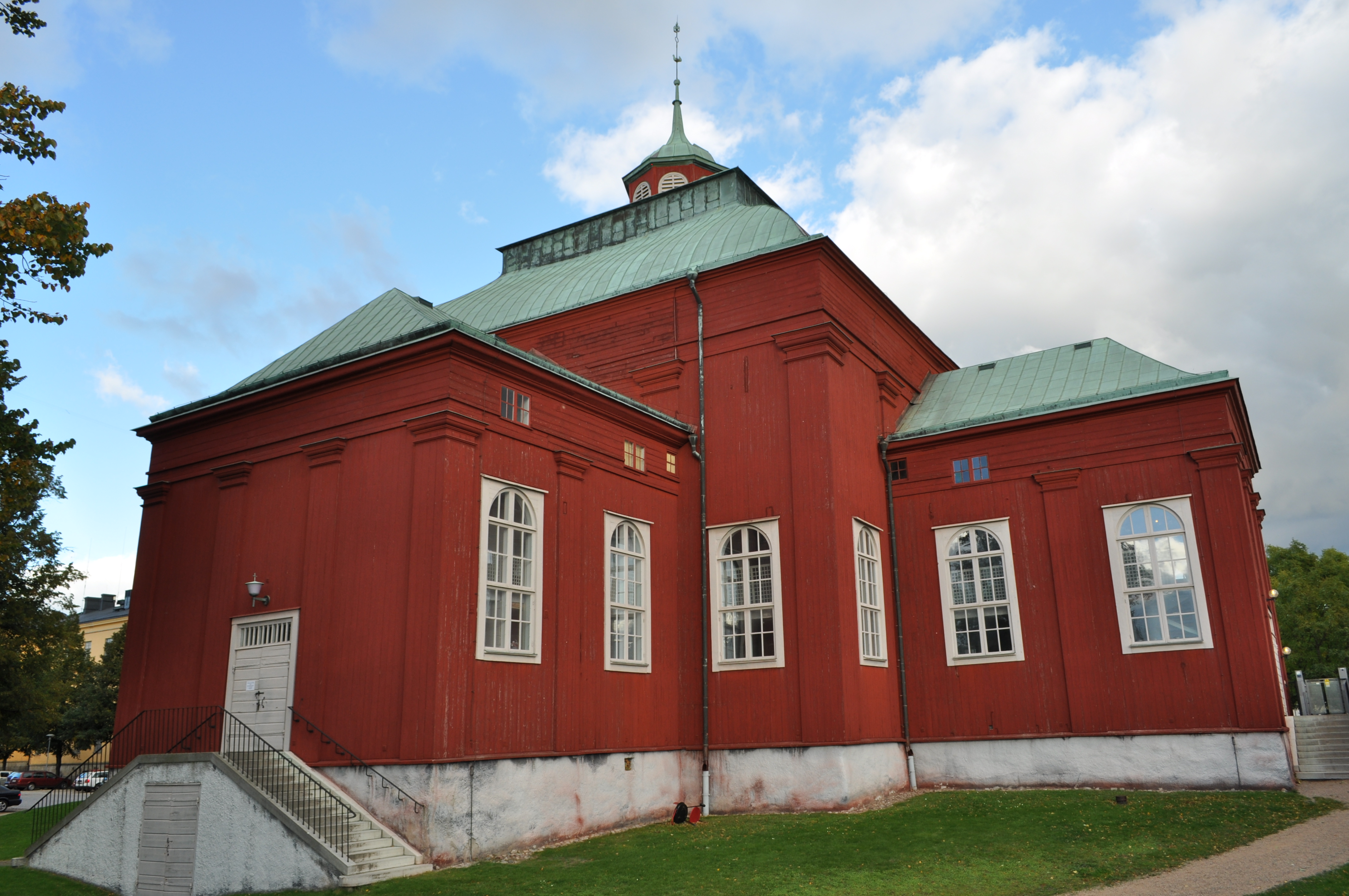
Amiralitetskyrkan

In front of the Amiralitetskyrkan church is the statue of Rosenbom, made famous by the children's book of Selma Lagerlöf, The Wonderful Adventures of Nils, in which the statue tells the story of the church. The man is seen holding some text in Swedish. The English translation of that text is "I humbly beg of you, even though my voice may be weak, come and put a penny in but first lift my hat. Blessed are those that care for the poor." (The last sentence being adapted from the Bible.) Nearby, there is paper with the translation of that text, the translated languages are English, German, Polish, Danish, Norwegian, and Finnish. The English translation is written by Gorge Hopkins. Near the church is also the Admiralstorn Tower, dating from 1699, originally used to indicate the time for the shipyard workers but used since 1909 as the church tower

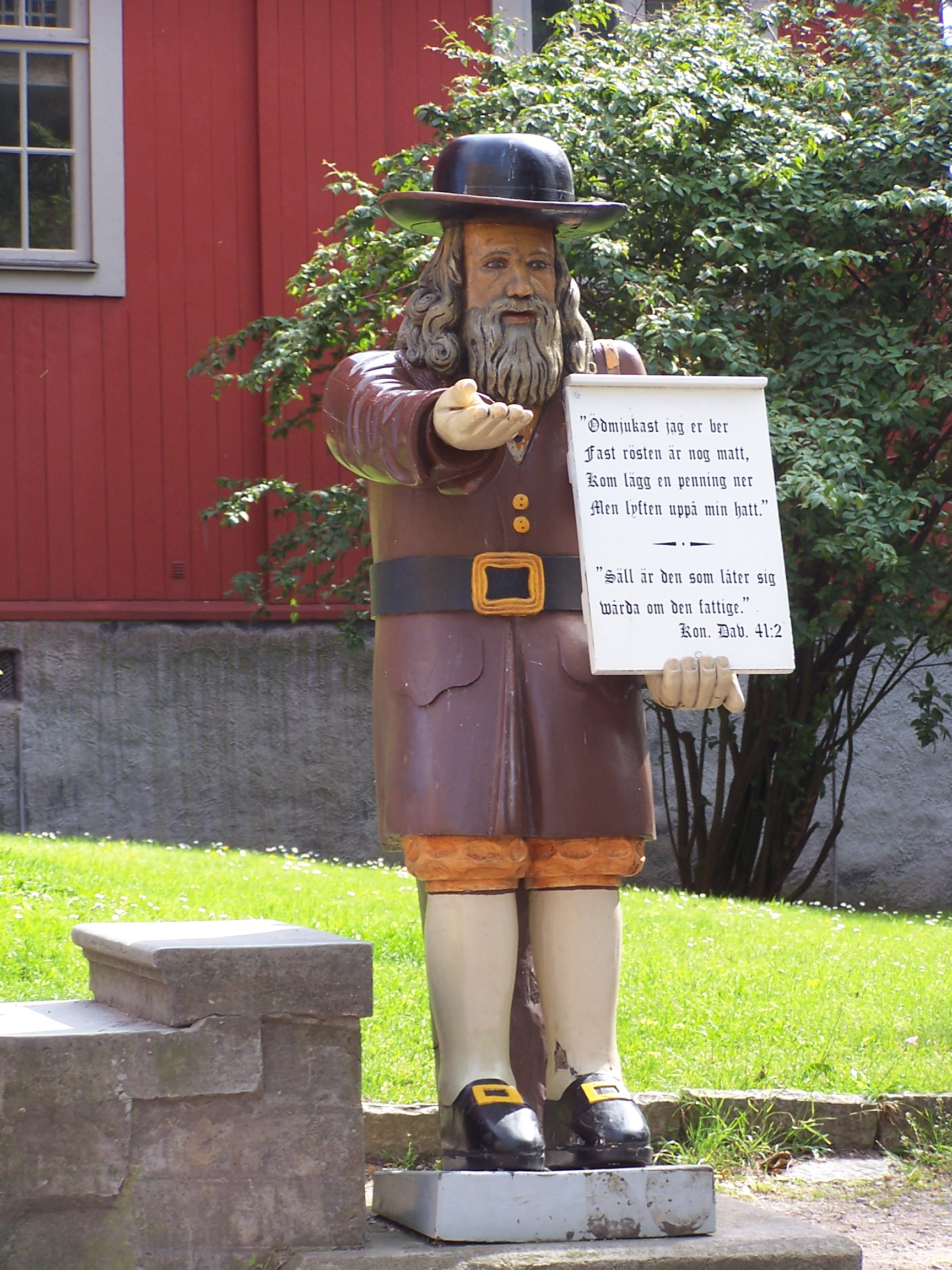
The statue of Rosenbom

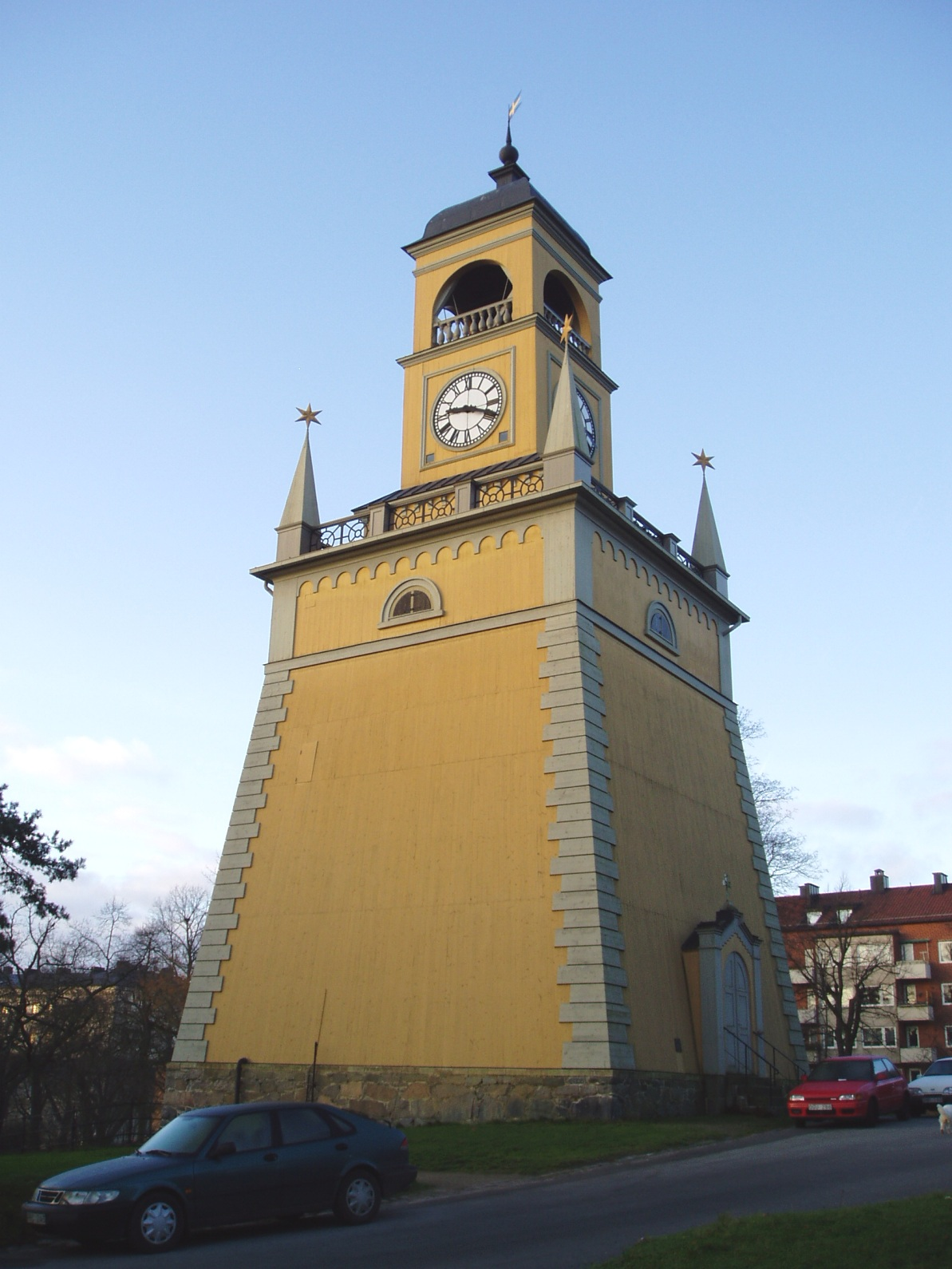
Admiralstorn

Finally, the city has some more recent buildings, such as the model room, having hosted between 1780 and 1920 models of boats, Now transferred to the Marine Museum, or the town hall built after the fire of 1790. Finally, the county residence (Länsresidenset) built between 1909 and 1911.

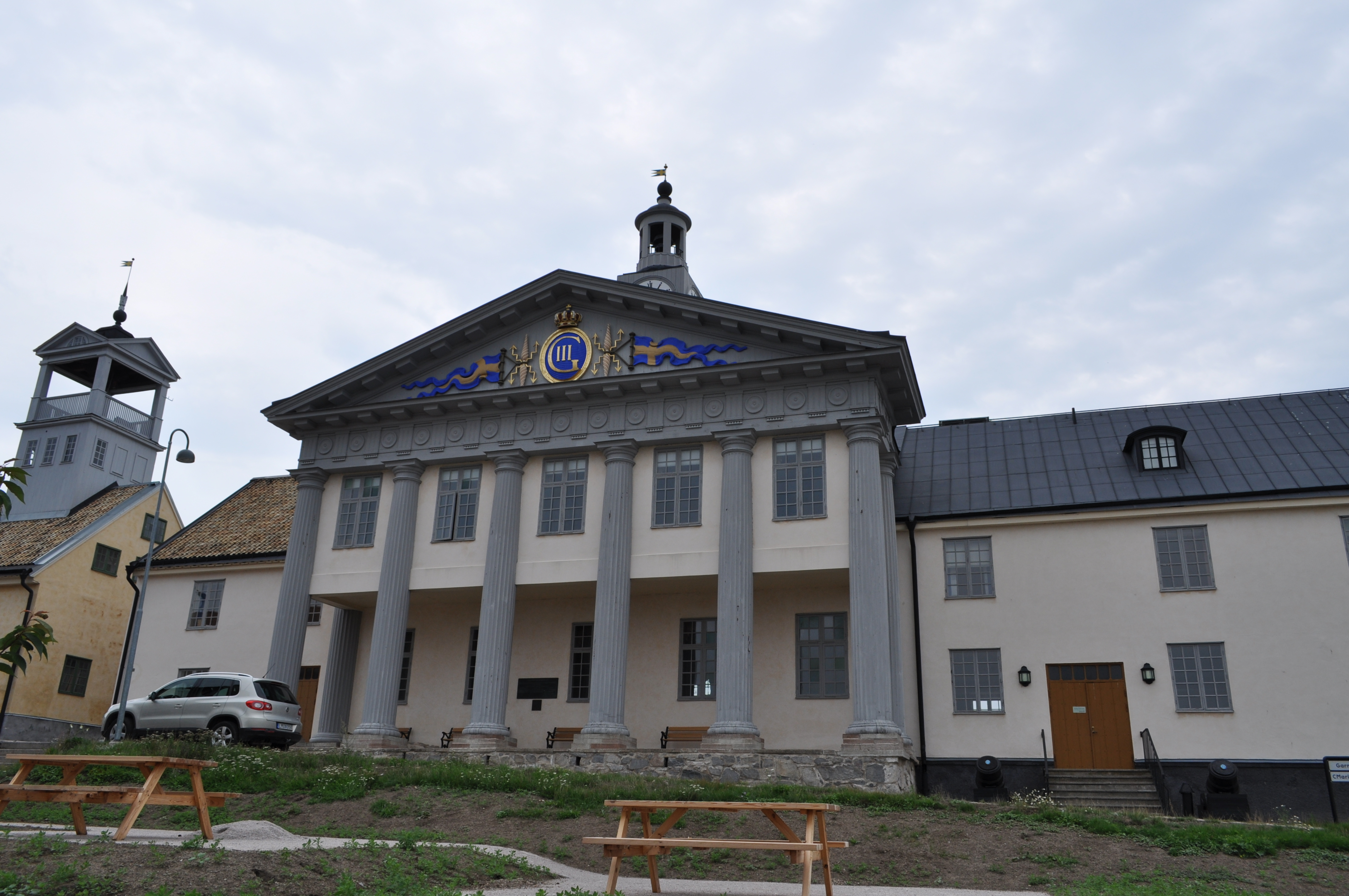
The model room

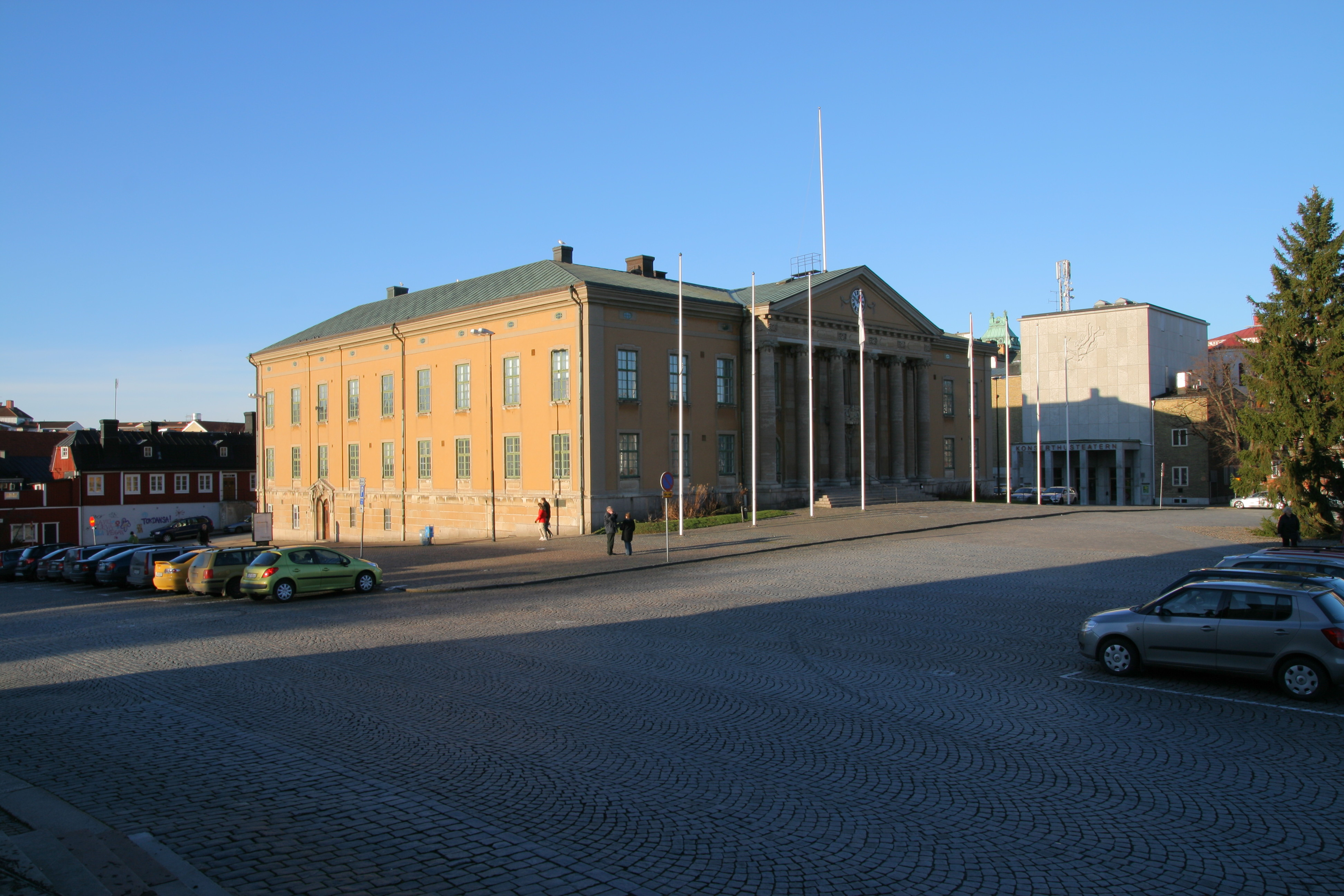
City Hall

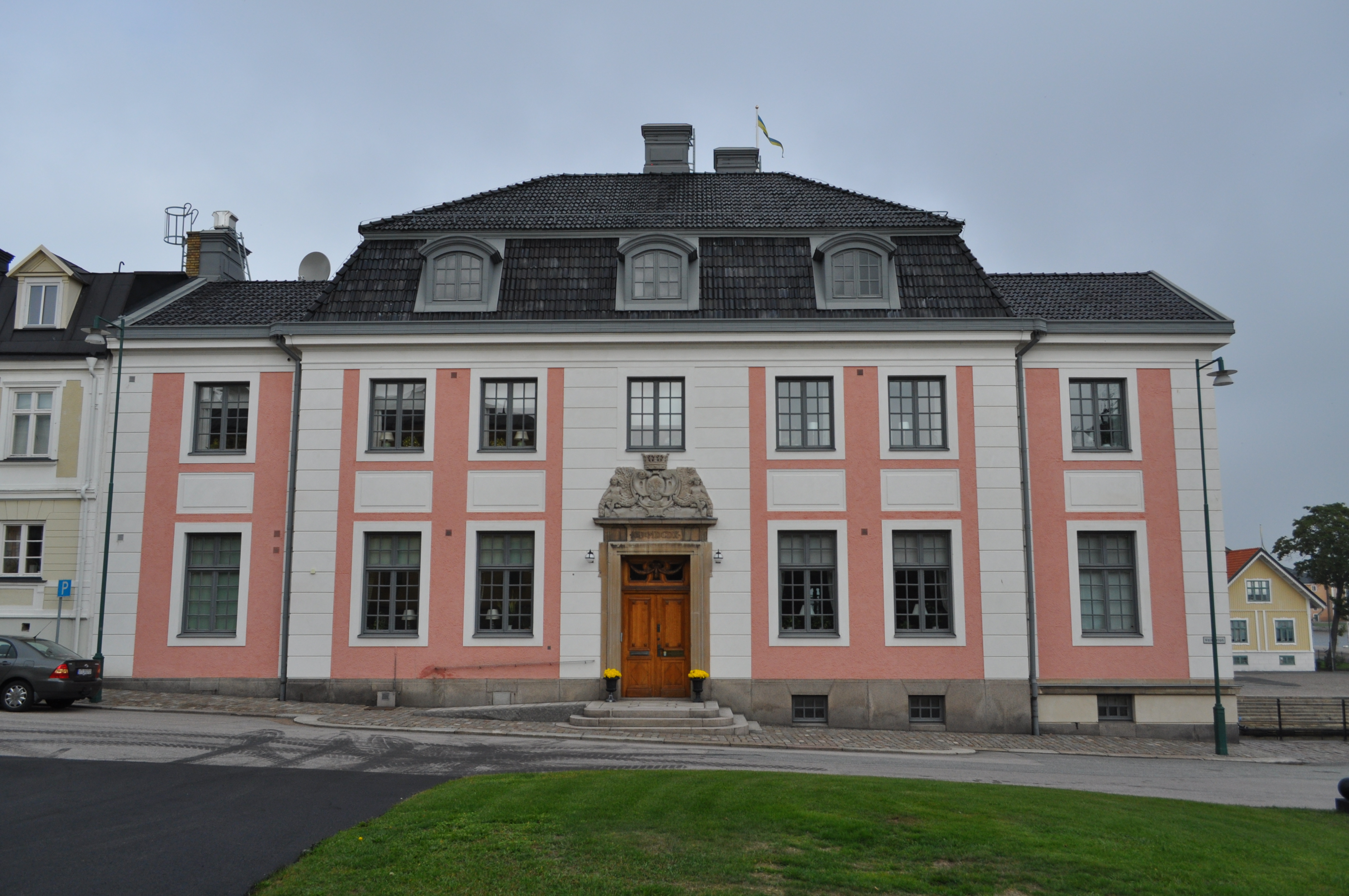
County governor residence

=== Museums ===
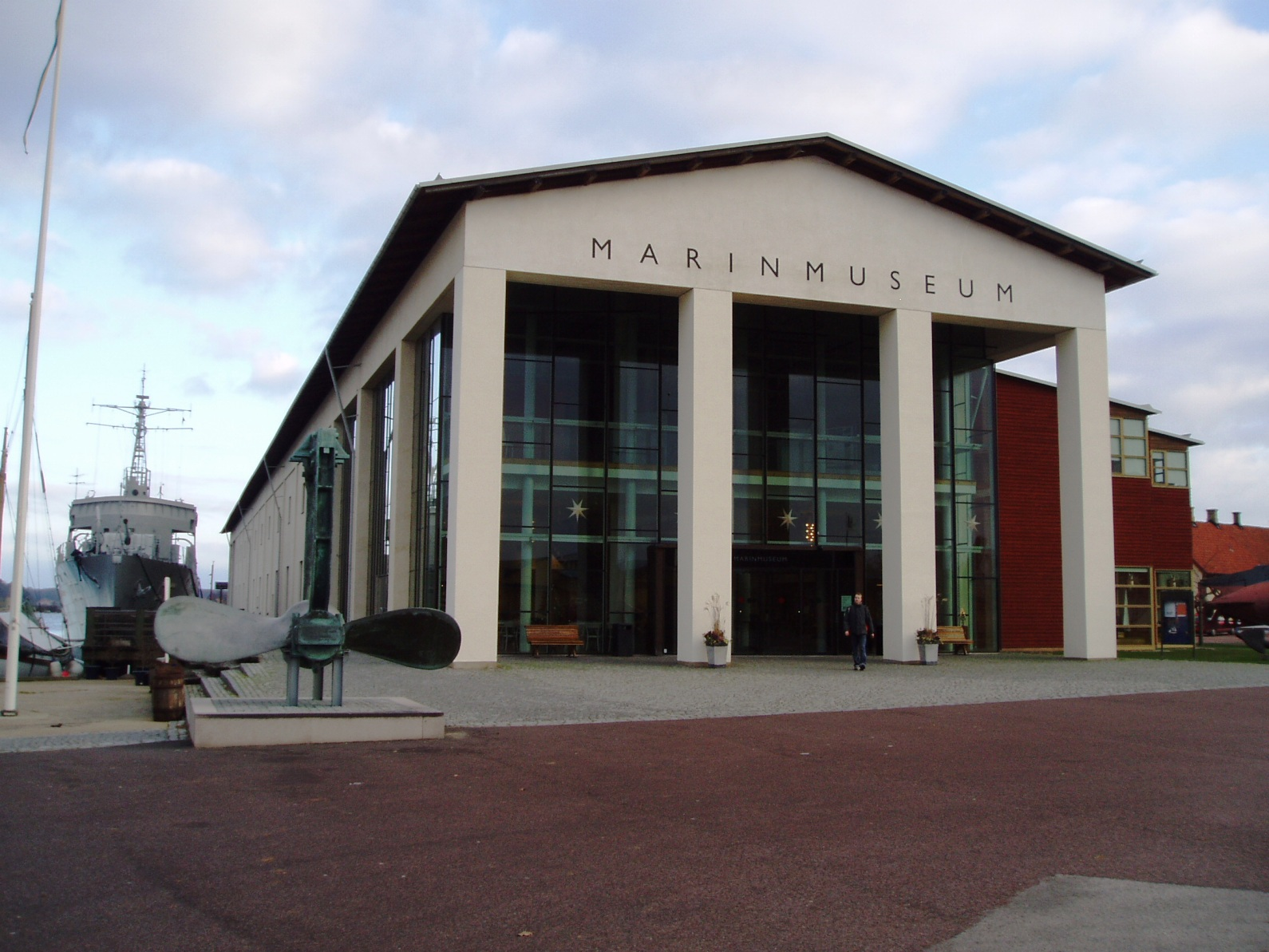
The Museum of the Navy

The most visited museum of the city is the Naval Museum, with around 250,000 visitors a year. About half of those visitors are Swedish, the other half from other countries. The Naval Museum is Sweden's national museum for the history of the Swedish Navy. Along with exhibitions, the museum contains object collections, a drawings archive, photographic archive and a library. The museum is also involved in research.

The present museum building on Stumholmen in Karlskrona was opened in 1997 by the present king Carl XVI Gustaf. Before that the museum lay in the former cadet barracks in the naval harbour, Örlogshamnen, and until 1963 was known as the Shipyard Museum (Varvsmuseet).

The museum is based on the "model room" created in 1752 by King Adolf Frederick of Sweden, in which several boat models were stored in order to test different types of structures. Nowadays, these models still form the core of the museum's collection, but the museum also traces the history of the Royal Swedish Navy.

The city is also home to the Blekinge Museum, with 82,443 visitors in 2008.

== Economy ==
Some of the biggest employers in Karlskrona are Telenor Sverige, Ericsson, NKT A/S and Roxtec. The city has an overall strong presence in information technology based industries.

== Transport ==
The city is positioned at the south east corner of Sweden with excellent connections to the other side of the Baltic Sea. There is a ferry line to Gdynia in Poland transporting both goods and passengers provided by the ferry operator Stena Line.

Most of the islands of Karlskrona are connected by roads. One of the bigger populated islands, Aspö, is connected with a small road ferry. Boats also travel between the archipelago's various islands during the summer months.

The ones who handle most transport in Blekinge are Blekingetrafiken. They handle bus, boat and rail transport in Blekinge. They naturally operate in Karlskrona due to the fact that it is the biggest and the most important city in Blekinge.

=== Truck transport ===
The city is close to the European Highway 22, connected by a small section of highway, part of the national road 28. The E22 connects the main cities of southern Sweden such as Malmö, Lund, Kristianstad, then climbs along the east coast towards Kalmar and Norrköping. The national road 28 connects the Karlstad to Emmaboda.

=== Rail transport ===
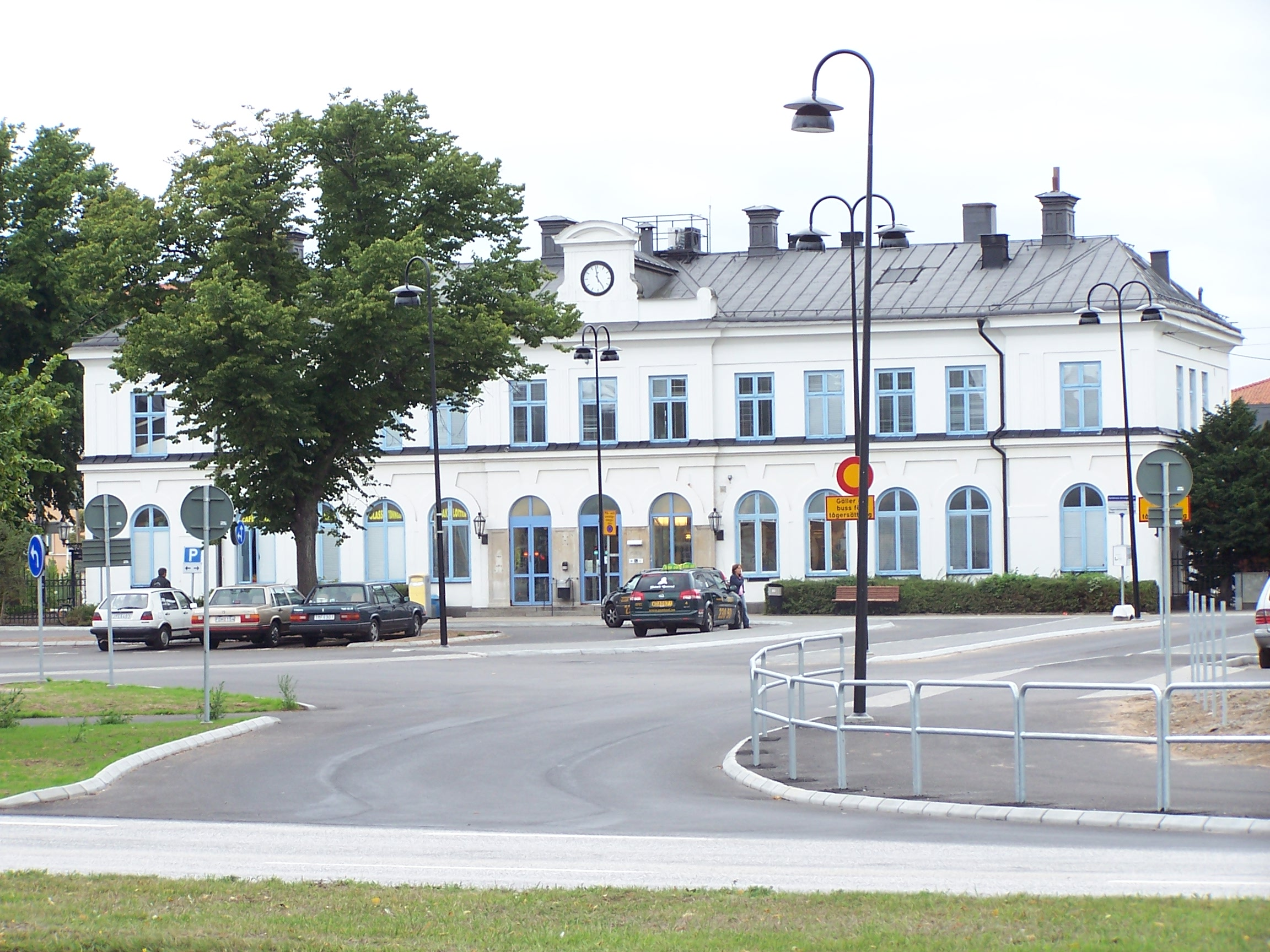
Karlskrona Central Station

As Karlskrona belonged to the most important cities in Sweden in the 19th century, particularly due to its large shipyard, it needed a railway connection. The city received its first railway line in 1874, connecting it to Växjö, which itself was connected since 1865 to the main line Södra stambanan. The line then came to the north of the city center of Karlskrona. The shipyard, further south, was connected in 1888, thanks to an underground line of 2 km, but the line closed in 1990. This line is now part of the Kust till Kust banan, linking Göteborg and Kalmar. The town received a new railway line in 1889 when the future Blekinge kustbana, linking Kristianstad to Karlskrona, was built.

=== Maritime transport ===
There is a regular ferry service from Karlskrona to Gdynia in Poland, operated by Stena Line, with an average of two return trips per day. This line carries nearly 500,000 people a year. The port of Karlskrona also serves the archipelago of Blekinge.

=== Air transport ===
The nearest airport to the city is Ronneby Airport, near Ronneby, with scheduled flights to Stockholm (Bromma and Arlanda). 191,168 people transited through this airport in 2009.

== Religion ==
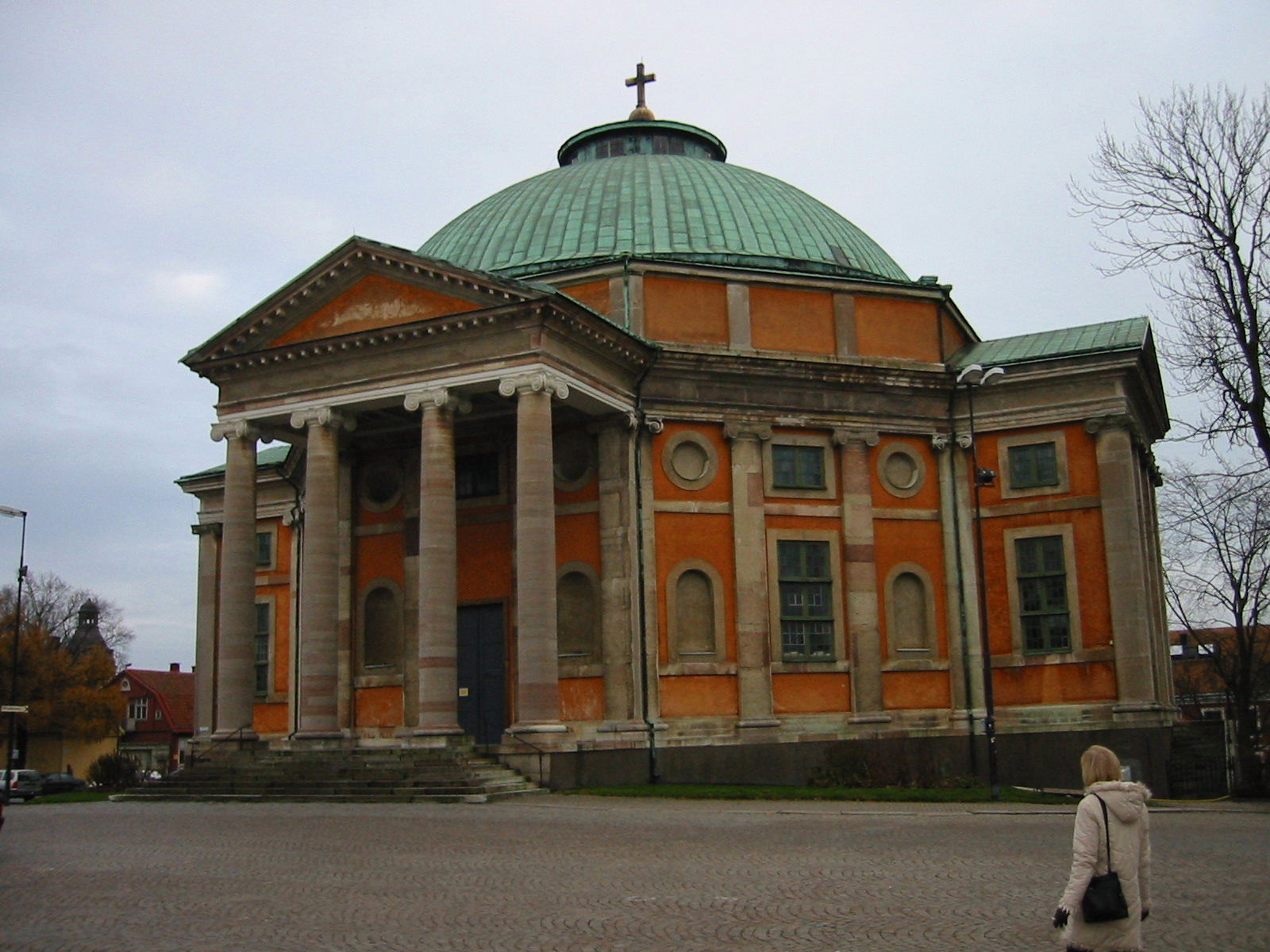
Heliga Trefaldighetskyrkan (Church of Holy Trinity)

There are three important churches in Karlskrona. Fredrikskyrkan (The Fredrik Church) was designed by Nicodemus Tessin the Younger, who was influenced by Italian architecture. The foundation of that church was laid in 1720, and it was inaugurated in 1744. It differs from usual Swedish churches in its orange color, adornment and its two towers despite not being a bishop's church.

Trefaldighetskyrkan (Church of Holy Trinity), commonly known as Tyska kyrkan (The German Church) was built between 1697 and 1709, following Tessin's drawings. It is likewise located at the market square in the centre core. The dome-shaped roof also takes its influence from Italian architecture and is rarely seen on Swedish churches.

Amiralitetskyrkan (Karlskrona Admiralty Church) was built in 1685 in red-painted wood and is one of Sweden's largest wooden churches. Just outside of the church there is a well-known statue called Rosenbom.

=== Parishes ===
- Karlskrona City Parish (from 10 August 1680)
- Karlskrona German Parish (from 10 August 1680 to 1 November 1846)
- Karlskrona Prisoner's Parish (from 1808 to 4 July 1866)
- The Mosaic Parish in Karlskrona (1785 to 1994)
- Royal Karlskrona Admiralty Parish (from 1681, a non-territorial parish)

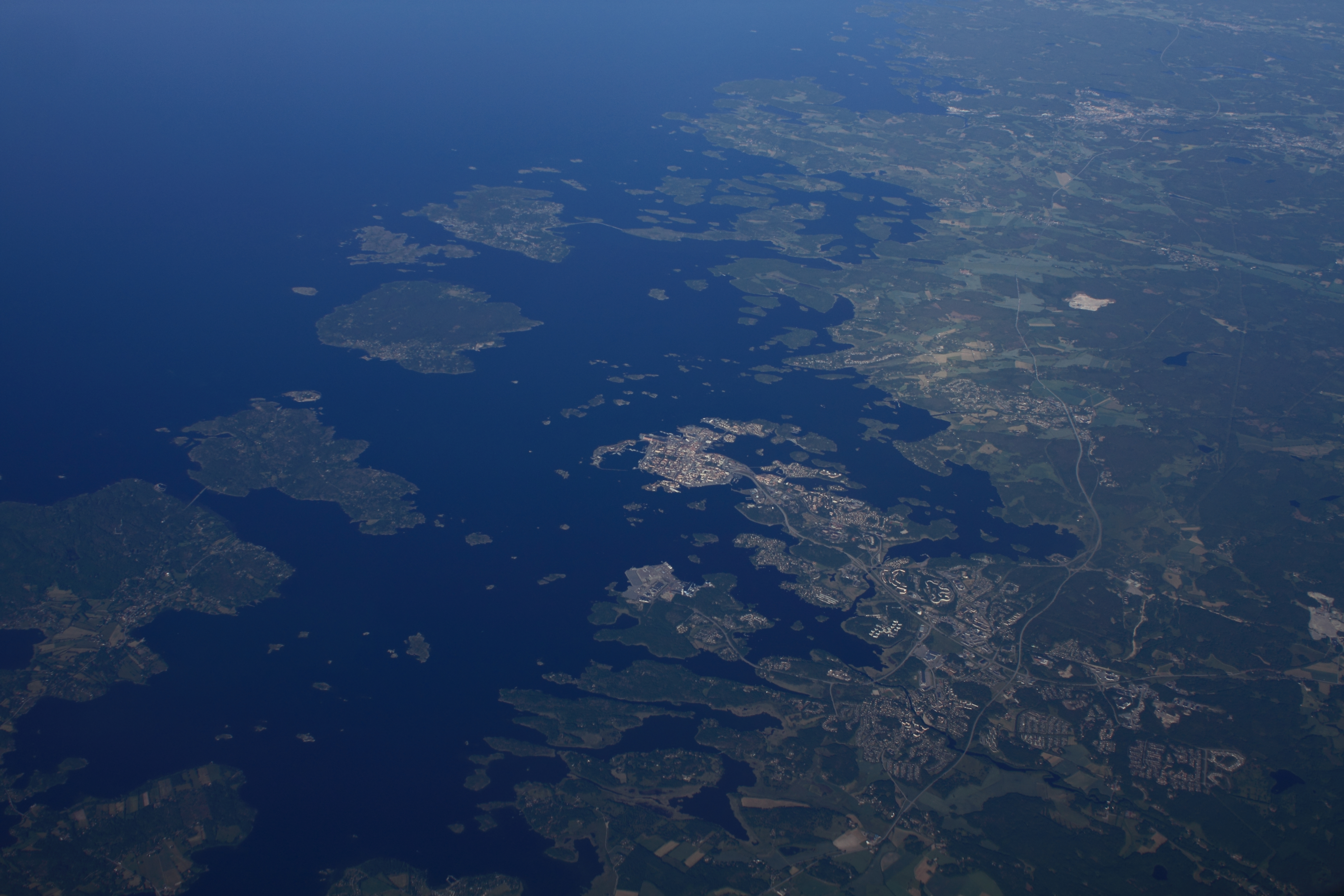
Aerial view of Karlskrona

There is also a Catholic Church, Our Lady of Fatima, at Södra Kungsgatan 1.

== Education ==
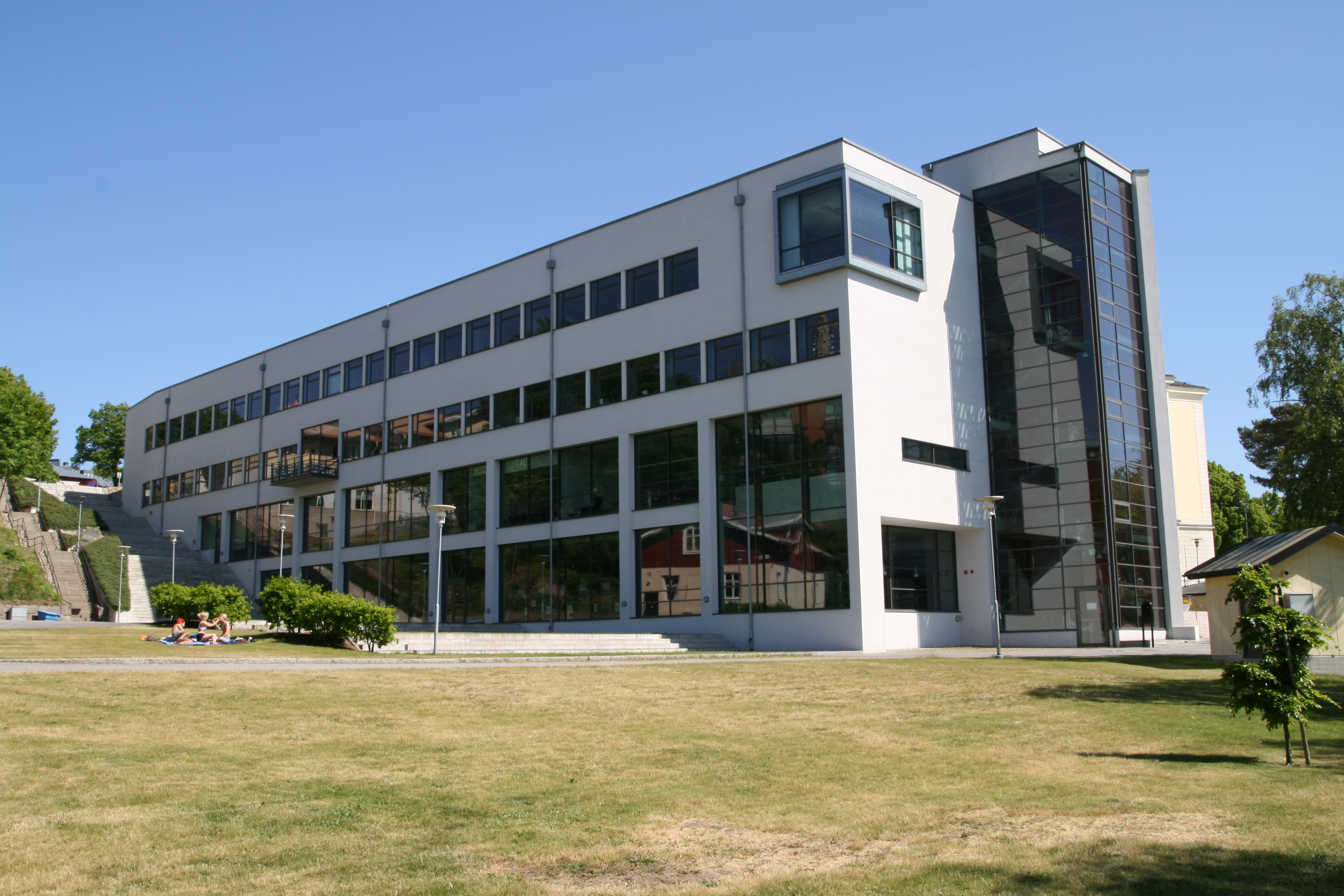
The library of Blekinge tekniska högskola

The city is the main campus of Blekinge tekniska högskola, an Institute of Technology founded in 1989, which is one of the few högskolor (university colleges) in Sweden with the right to issue a doctorate, thus having a status quite similar to that of a real university. The institute employs about 600 people and hosts about 8,000 students.

== Sports ==
The following sports clubs are located in Karlskrona:

- KA 2 IF
- Karlskrona HK
- FK Karlskrona
- Hästö IF
- Pillagers HC
- FBC Karlskrona
- Carlskrona IF

== Prominent People from Karlskrona ==
- Johannes Braun (1799-1859) the Paul Revere of California
- Victor Balck (1844-1928), Father of Swedish Sports, Original member of the IOC
- Greczula, Singer
- Oliver Ekman-Larsson, Ice hockey player for the Toronto Maple Leafs
- Jonathan Ericsson, Former Ice hockey player for the Detroit Red Wings
- Patrik Klüft (né Kristiansson), Former Swedish pole vault record holder
- Miro Zalar, Former Swedish pole vault record holder
- Patrik Strenius, Former Swedish 100m record holder
- Carl-Gunnar Wingård (1894-1977), Actor

== In literature ==
In The Surgeon's Mate by Patrick O'Brian, Karlskrona is the base for the British Baltic fleet, approximately 1813, when the two nations were at peace with each other and allied against Napoleon. Captain Jack Aubrey and Stephen Maturin start an action to free a group of Catalan forces still in French service on a fictional island on the Pomeranian coast. The estimable Vice Admiral Sir James Saumarez is still in command of the Baltic fleet for the purpose of the novel.

== Gallery ==
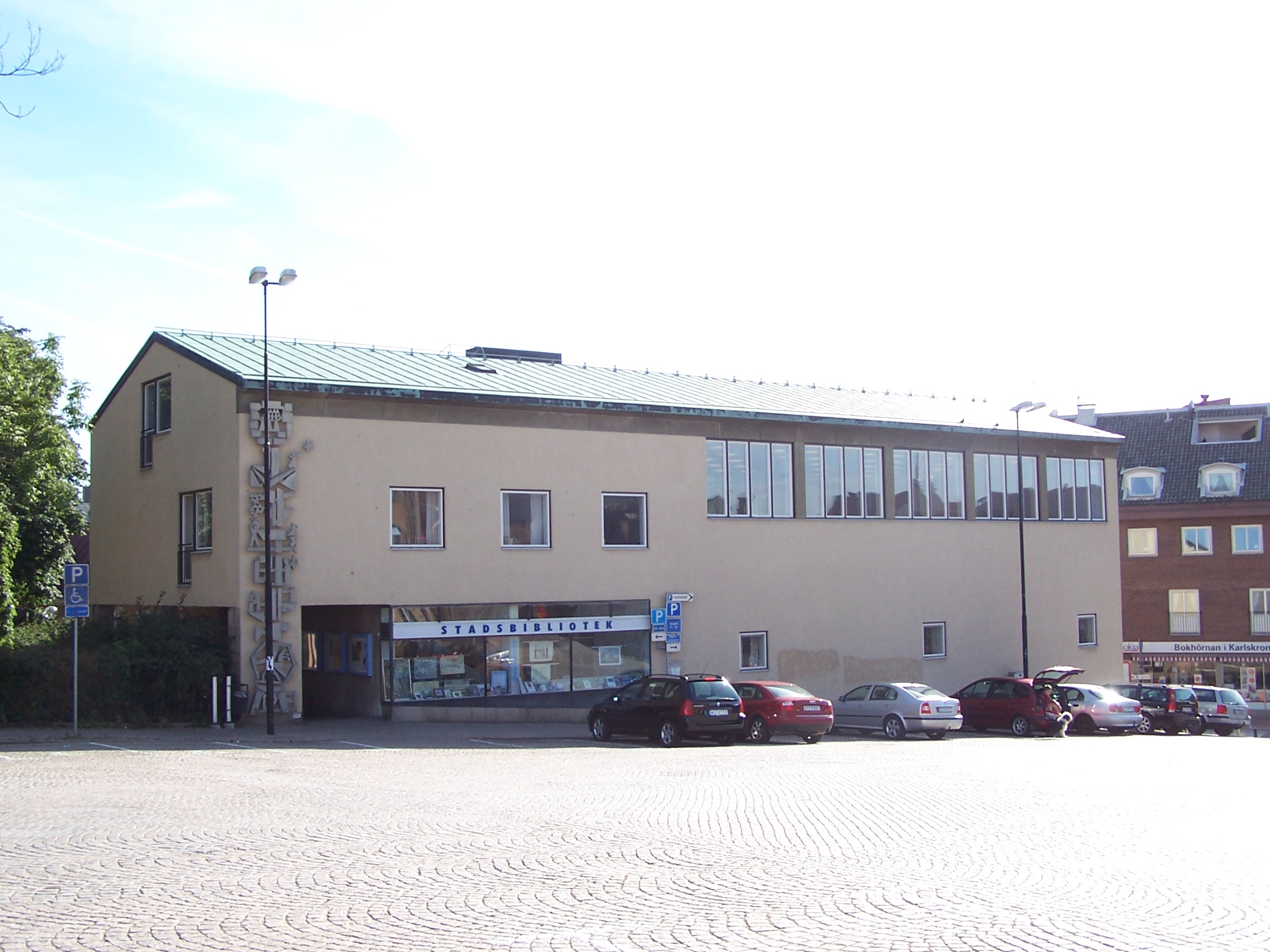
Karlskrona city public library

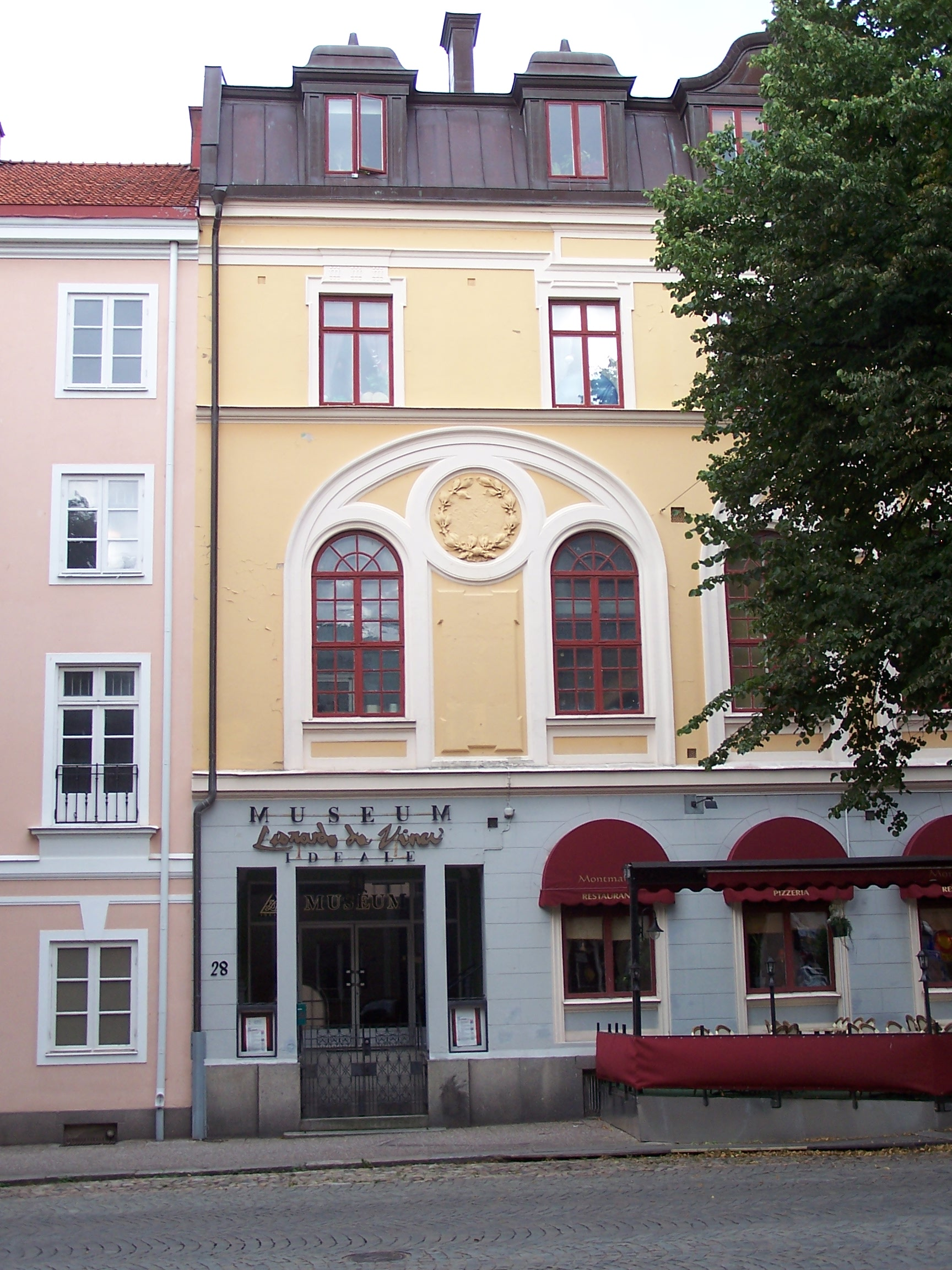
Museum Lionardo da Vinci Ideale

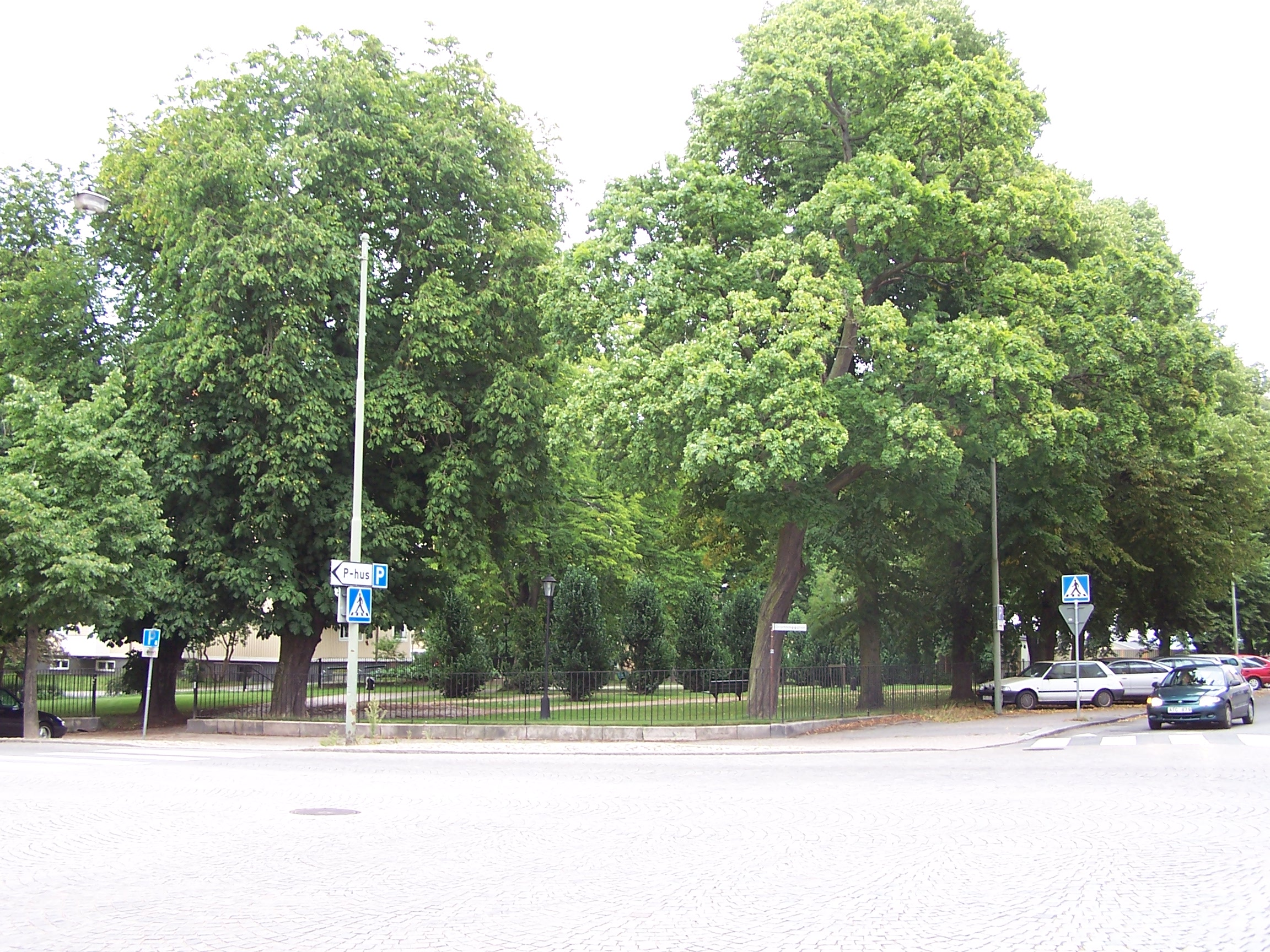
Kapellparken

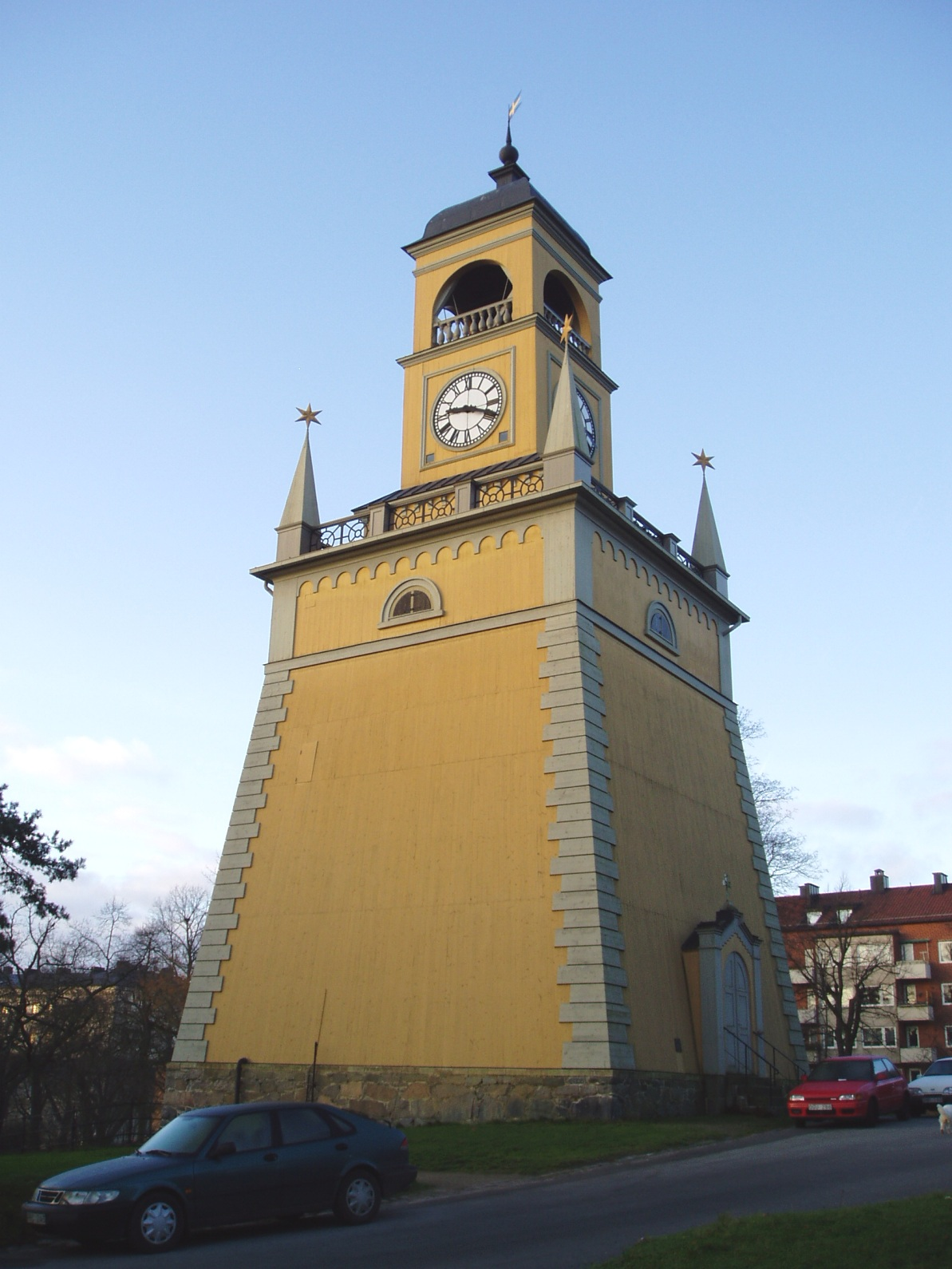
Admiralstorn (bell tower)

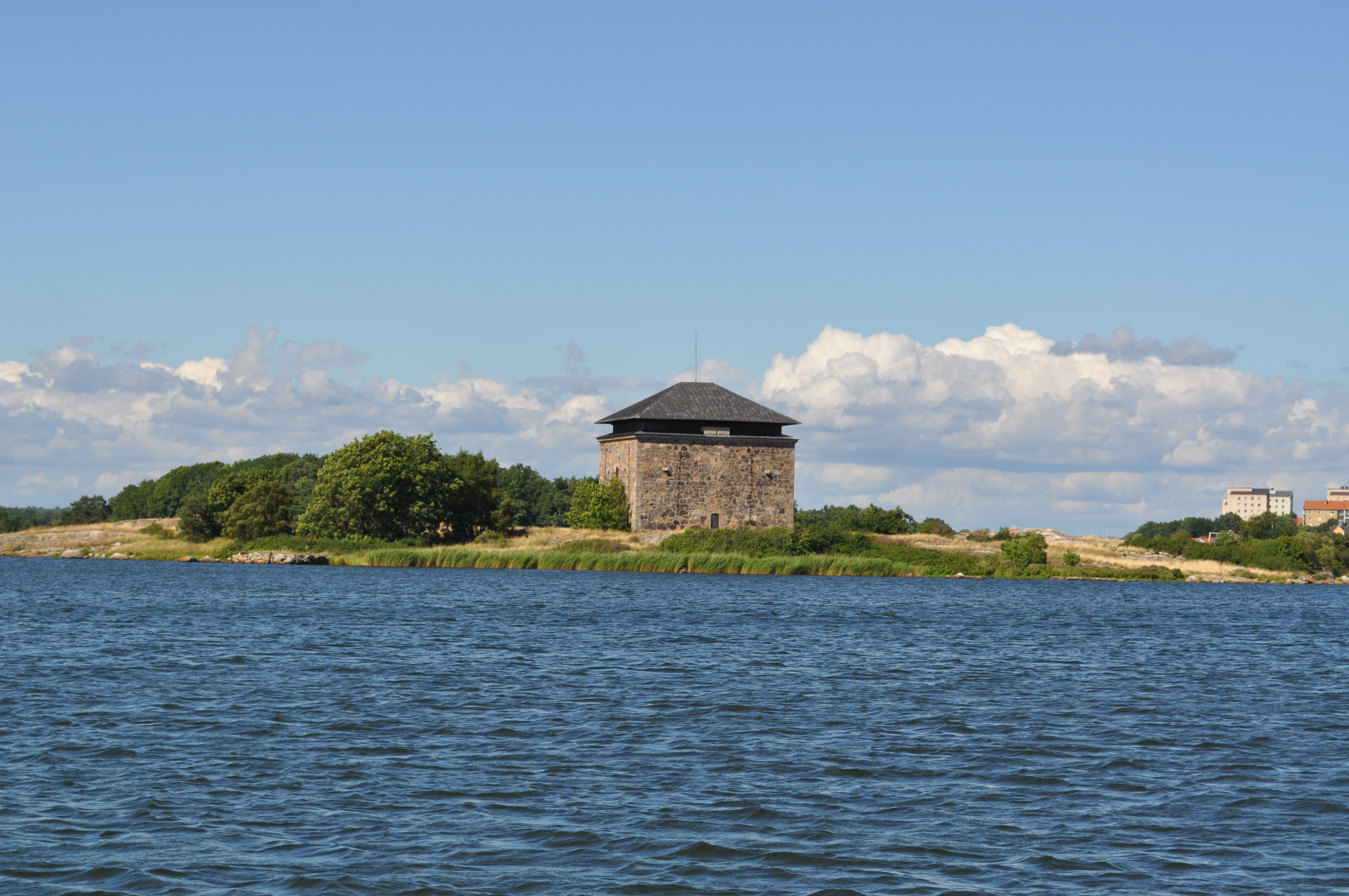
Gunpowder House

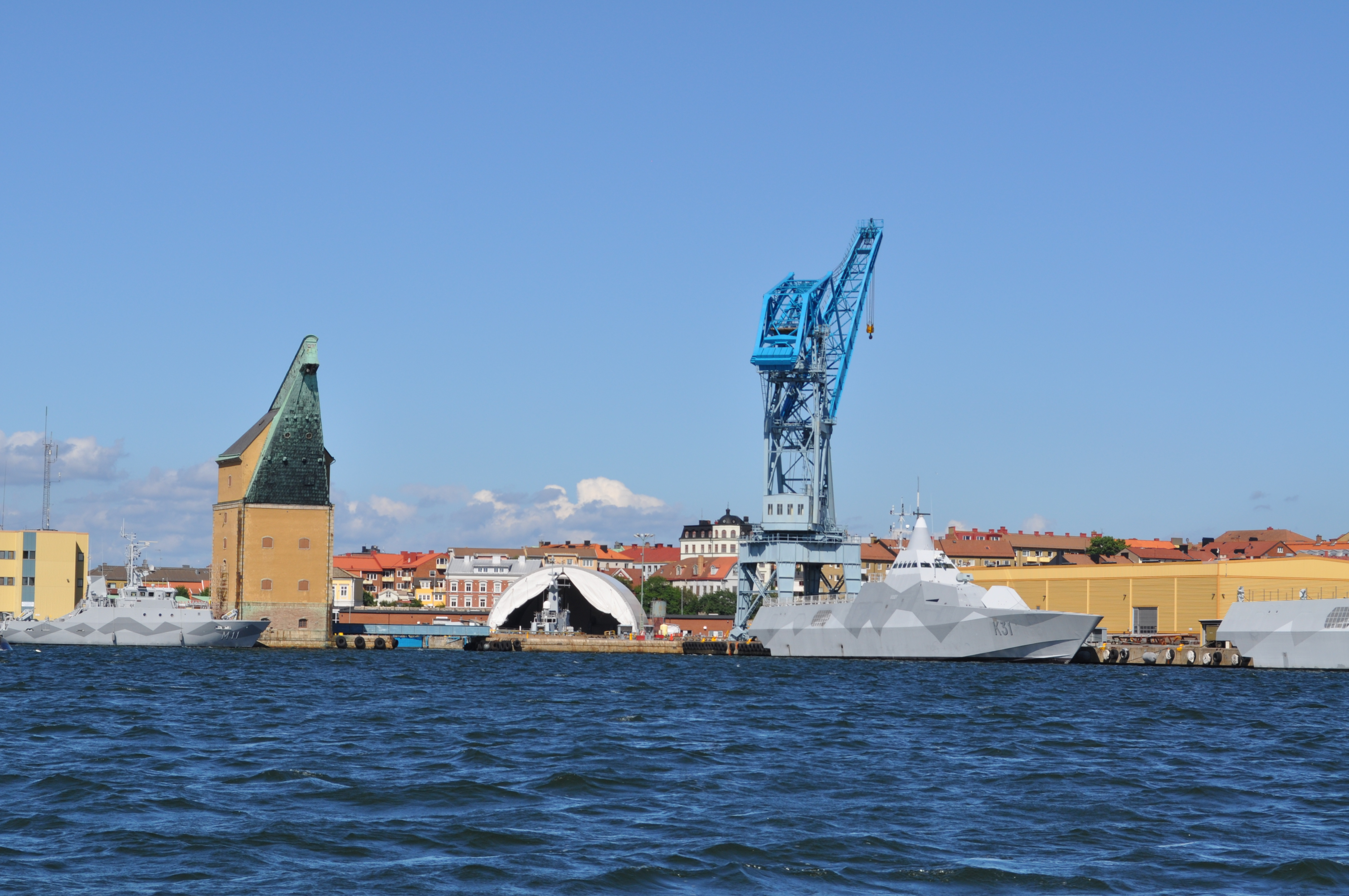
The shipyard Karlskronavarvet with the old crane

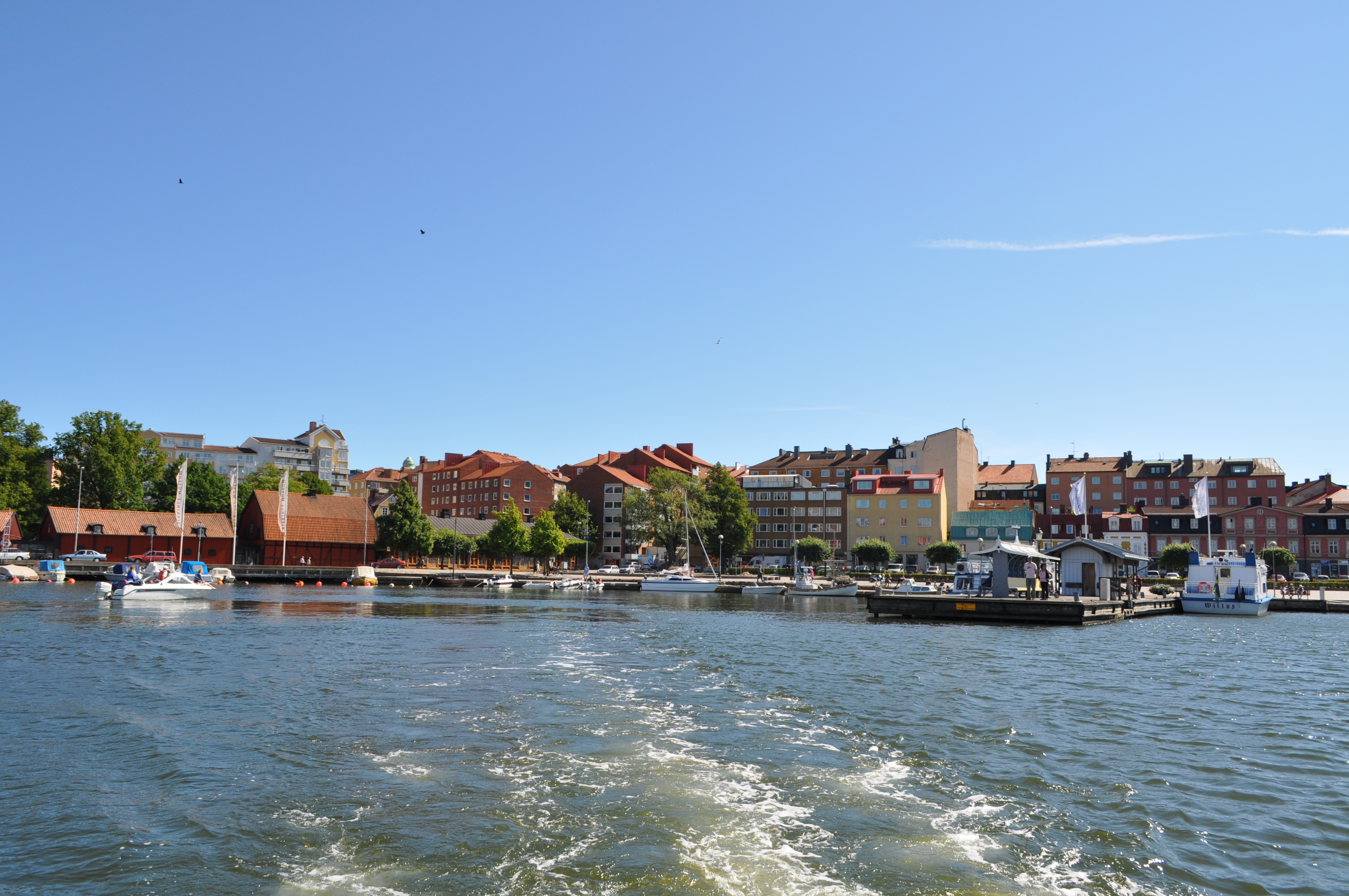
Fiskbron, the old harbour in centre of karlskrona

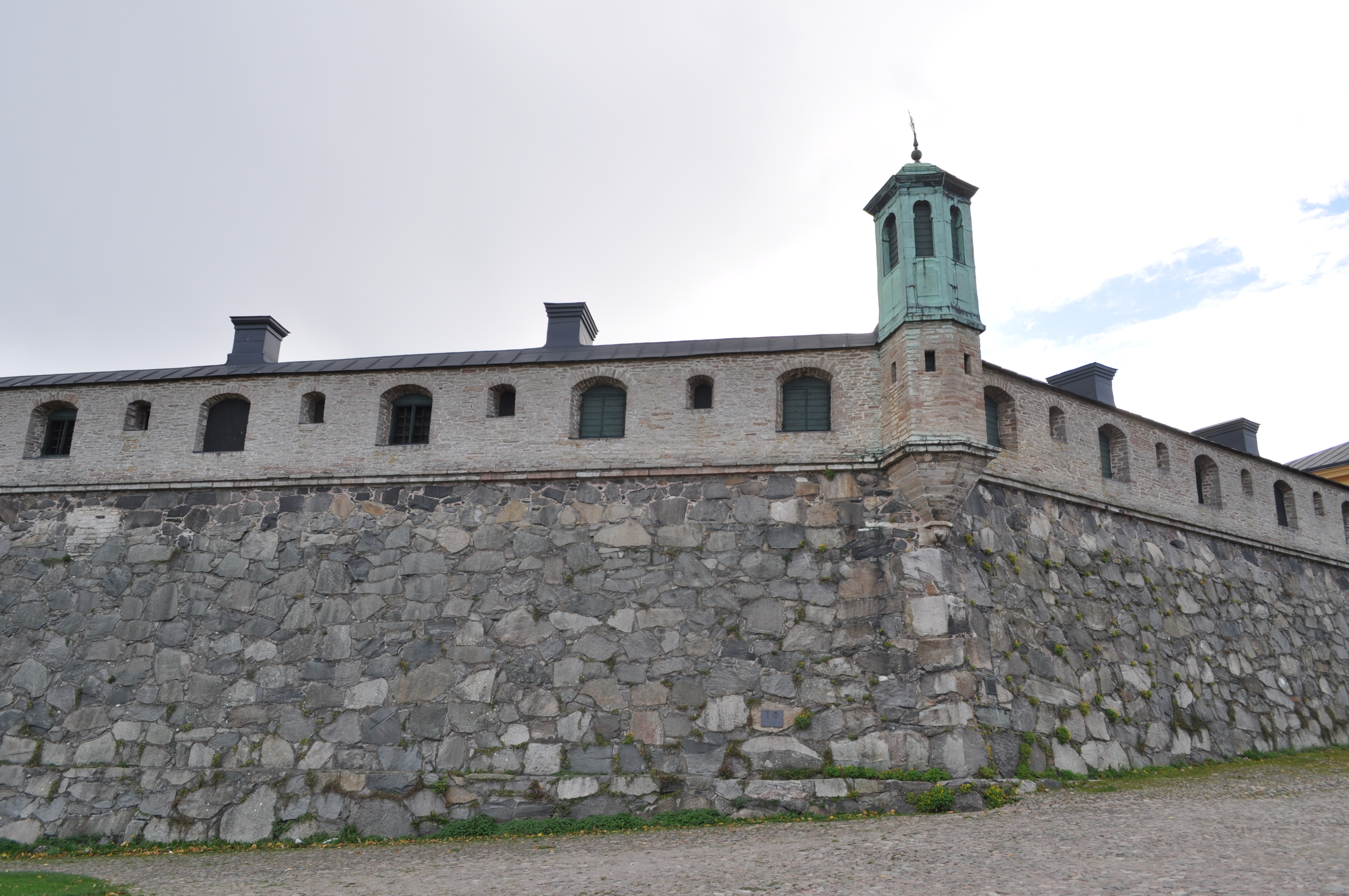
Bastion Aurora

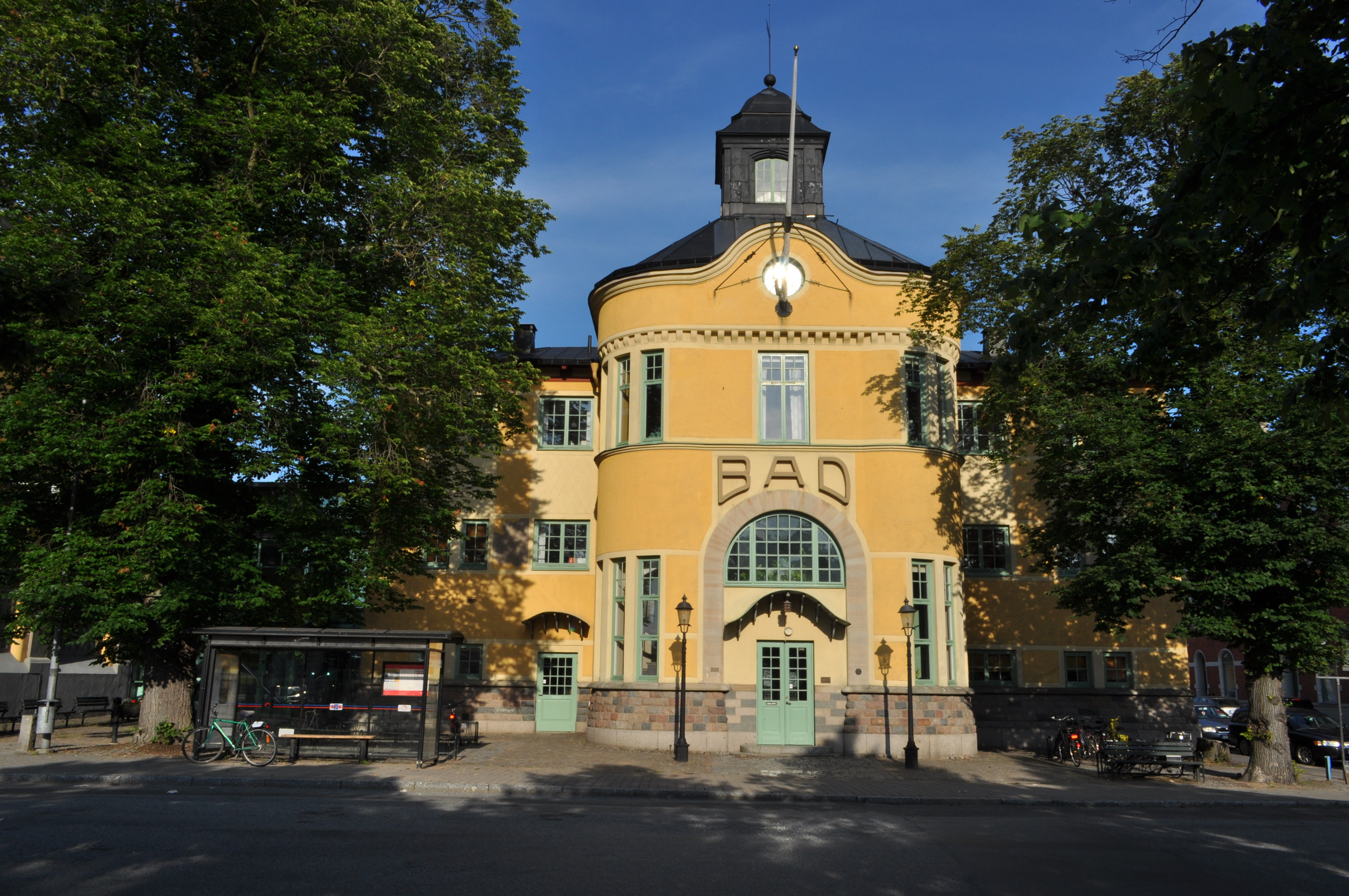
Bath-house in Karlskrona

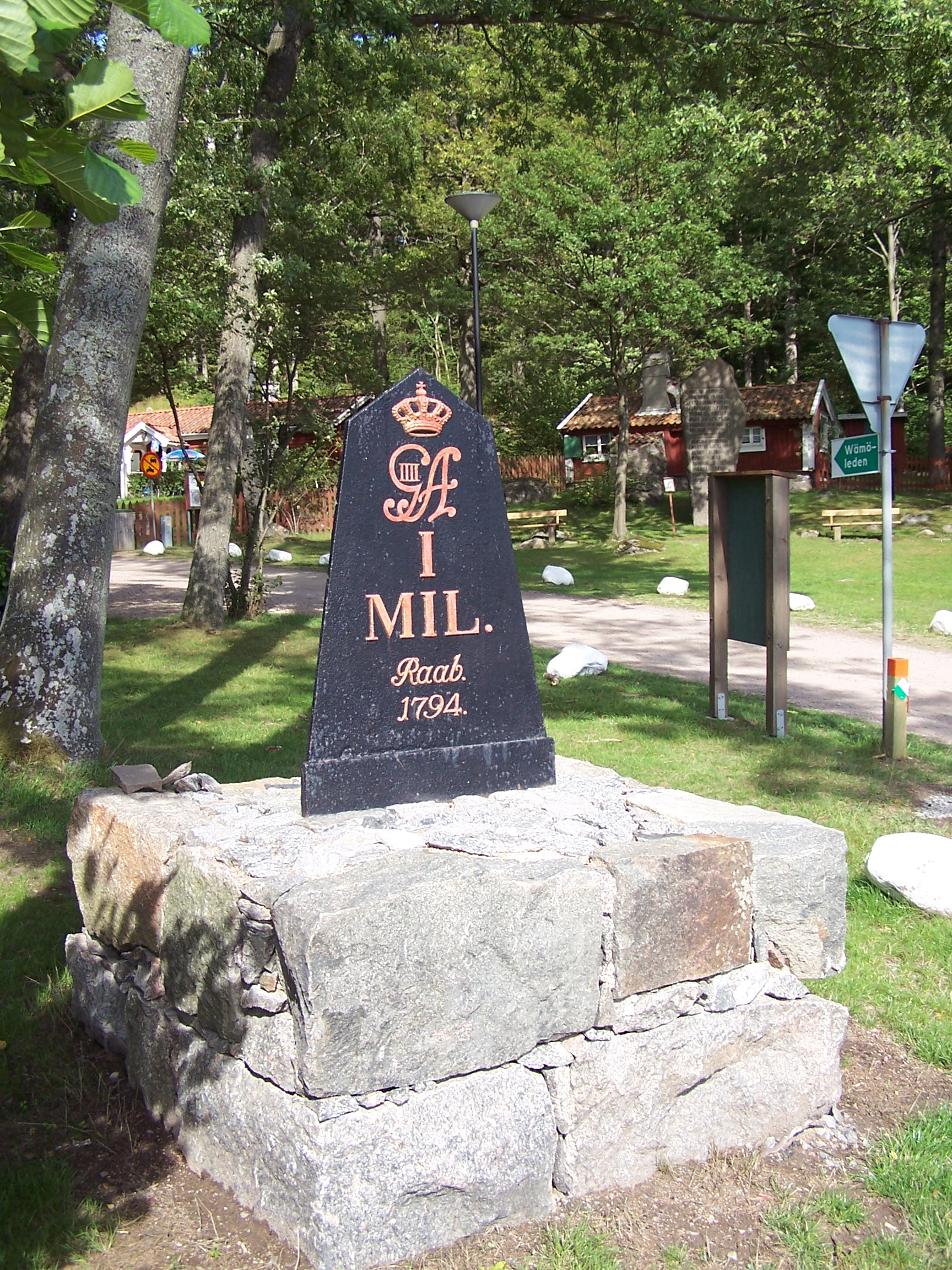
Milestone in Karlskrona

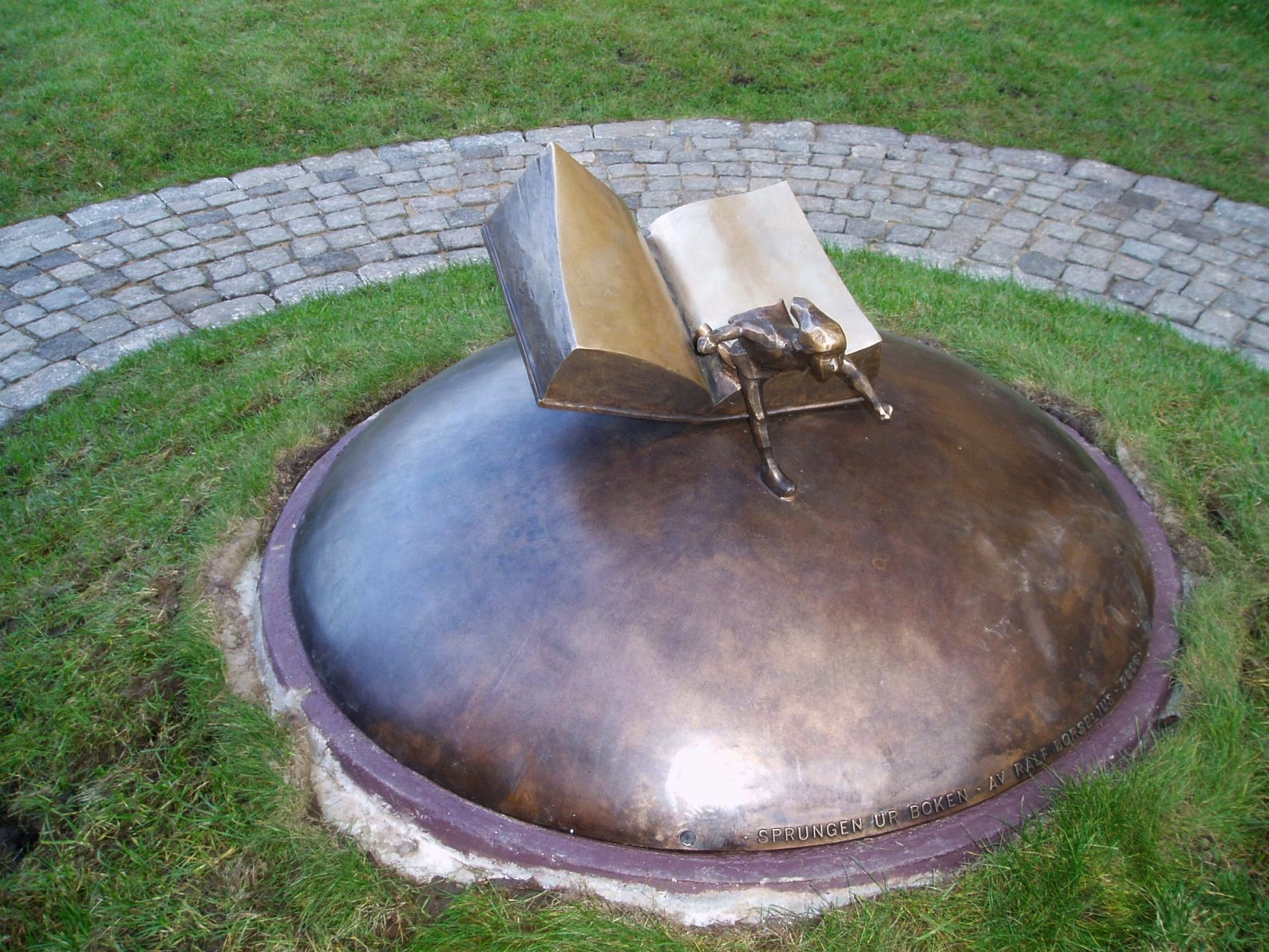
Nils Holgersson, statue made by Ralf Borselius

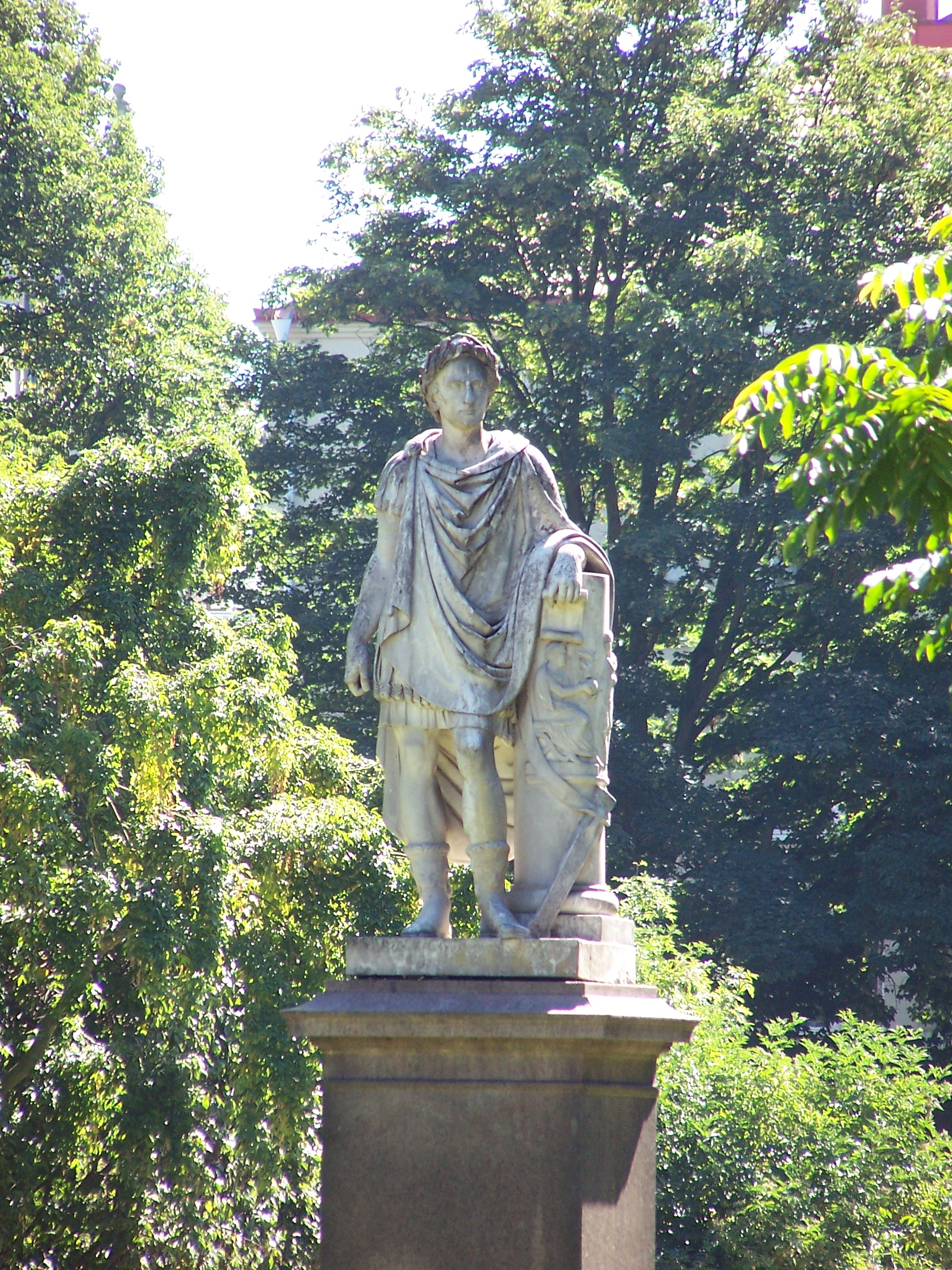
Statue of King Charles XIII

== See also ==
- U 137
- Swedish Coast Guard
- Workers Front for Indochina
