= Skärgårdsfest =

Karlskrona Skärgårdsfest is a festival where the unique history of the world heritage meet the pulse of people and the modern city. During these days, usually in the end of July, the city parks and gems bursts with music and festival activities.
