= Carlskrona IF =

Floorball club in Karlskrona, Sweden

- Full name: Carlskrona innebandyförening
- Short name: CIF
- Founded: 1988
- Arena: Karlskrona idrottshall

Carlskrona IF is a floorball club in Karlskrona, Sweden, established in 1988. The men's team played in the Swedish top division during the 1990s and won a bronze medal at the Swedish national championship playoffs during the 1992-1993 and 1993-1994 seasons.
