= Workers Front for Indochina =

The Workers Front for Indochina (in Swedish: Arbetarfront för Indokina) was a political group in Karlskrona, Sweden. The group emerged as the Karlskrona FNL-Group broke away from the United FNL Groups (DFFG) in January 1973. The Karlskrona group decided to continue to function as an independent socialist group, continuing to collect money for the Vietnamese National Liberation Front (FNL).

The group refuted the approach of DFFG to organize workers and bourgeious in one organization, and the group claimed that only the working class had a genuine interest in supporting a social revolution in Indochina.

The group published Arbetarfront 1973–1975. In February 1975, they claimed that Arbetarfront had an circulation of 500.
