= Plx =

PLX, or Picatinny Liquid Explosive, a liquid binary explosive

PLX or Plx or plx may also refer to:

- PLX Technology a former manufacturer of integrated circuits focused on PCI Express and Ethernet
- .plx a file extension used by the computer language perl
- plx symbol for pico lux
- PLX a product of Pen-Link
- PLX "placental expanded cells" a technology of Pluristem Therapeutics
- AMEX and Tase symbols for Protalix BioTherapeutics are PLX
- PLX is the IATA code for Semey Airport
- pLX (vector) a transformation vector

== See also ==
- PLX 1468.2 or 45 Aurigae a binary star system
- PLX-1000 a turntable by Pioneer DJ
- PLX Tjärö, an art and music festival held in the Blekinge archipelago, Sweden
