= Fabian Månsson =

Swedish politician

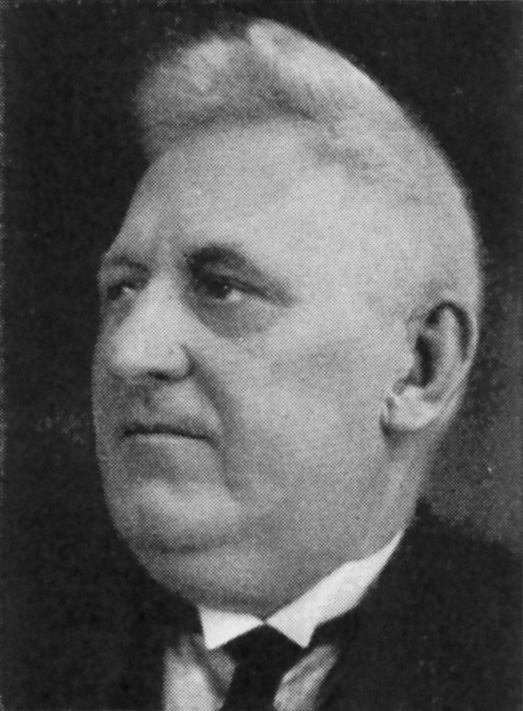
Fabian Månsson

Karl Fabian Månsson (1872–1938) was a Swedish politician. In his youth, Månsson used the pseudonym Dacke, a name he borrowed from the 16th century peasant rebel Nils Dacke.

Fabian Månsson was born in a poor family in Hasslö, an island in the Blekinge archipelago. His father was a fisherman.

From around 1900 Månsson was in a relationship with the activist Maria Qvist and they married in 1925.

Fabian Månsson worked as a navvy and became active as a radical in the Social Democratic Party, for which he also worked as an agitator, a journalist, and a poet. In 1912 he was elected to the lower house of the Riksdag where he was reelected until his death.

When the Social Democratic Party was split in 1917, Månsson who always opposed centralistic rule joined the radical, revolutionary group which formed the Social Democratic Left Party. However, Månsson opposed communism and left the new party when its leader, Zeth Höglund, moved the party into joining the Communist International. Fabian Månsson decided to rejoin the Social Democratic Party, but continued to scrutinize it from a radical angle.

Månsson wrote several historical works, including a three-volume work on Nils Dacke. He was made honorary Doctor of Philosophy at the University of Uppsala in 1932.

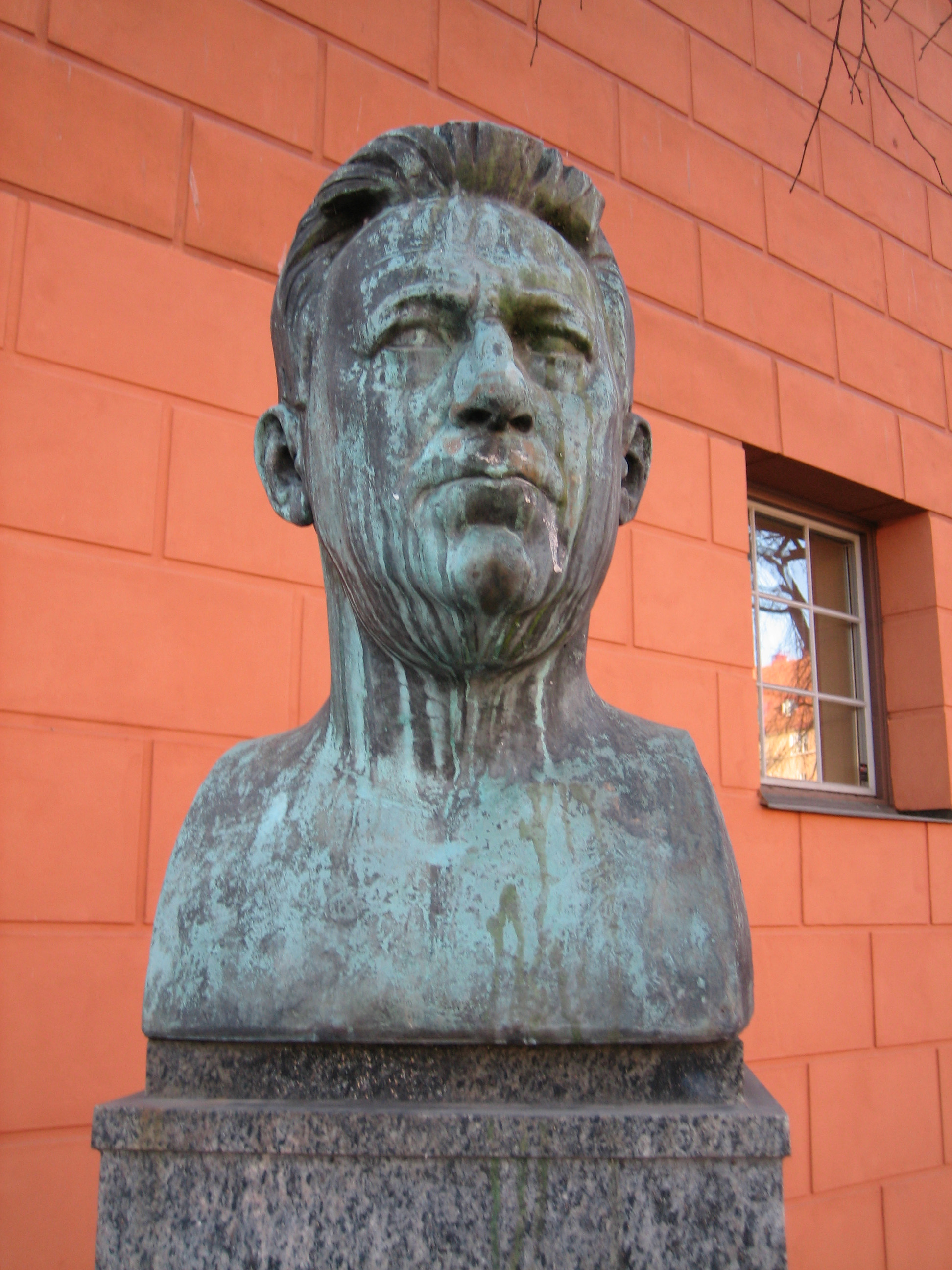
Bust of Fabian Månsson in Stockholm

His younger comrade Fredrik Ström wrote a biography about him, simply called Fabian (1948).

Today there is a statue of Fabian Månsson erected at his birthplace of Hasslö, and a bust outside Stockholm City Library.
