= Grönvall =

Grönvall is a Swedish surname.

== Geographical distribution ==
As of 2014, 71.7% of all known bearers of the surname Grönvall were residents of Sweden (frequency 1:10,856) and 25.9% of Finland (1:16,759).

In Sweden, the frequency of the surname was higher than national average (1:10,856) in the following counties:

1. Skåne County (1:3,484)
2. Uppsala County (1:7,287)
3. Gävleborg County (1:7,569)
4. Halland County (1:8,047)
5. Värmland County (1:8,407)
6. Södermanland County (1:9,972)
7. Örebro County (1:10,563)
8. Kalmar County (1:10,744)

In Finland, the frequency of the surname was higher than national average (1:16,759) in the following regions:

1. Åland (1:4,036)
2. Kymenlaakso (1:7,768)
3. Lapland (1:9,627)
4. Pirkanmaa (1:10,522)
5. Satakunta (1:10,672)
6. Uusimaa (1:11,036)
7. Tavastia Proper (1:12,857)
8. Central Finland (1:14,094)

== People ==
- Reinhold Grönvall (1851–1916), Finnish Lutheran clergyman and politician
- Hanna Grönvall (1879–1953), Swedish politician
- Nils Grönvall (1894–1983), Swedish fencer
- Nanne Grönvall (born 1962), Swedish singer-songwriter
- Janne Grönvall (born 1973), Finnish professional ice hockey player

== See also ==
- Grönwall
