= Hasslö =

- Location within Blekinge Location within Sweden
- Coordinates: 56°06′30″N 15°27′45″E
- Country: Sweden
- Province: Blekinge
- County: Blekinge County
- Municipality: Karlskrona Municipality

Area
  - Total: 3.03 km^{2} (1.17 sq mi)

Population (31 December 2010)
  - Total: 1,628
  - Density: 537/km^{2} (1,390/sq mi)
- Time zone: UTC+1 (CET)
  - Summer (DST): UTC+2 (CEST)

Hasslö (Swedish pronunciation: [ˈhâsːlœ]) is an island and a locality situated in the Blekinge archipelago in Karlskrona Municipality, Blekinge County, Sweden with 1,628 inhabitants in 2010.

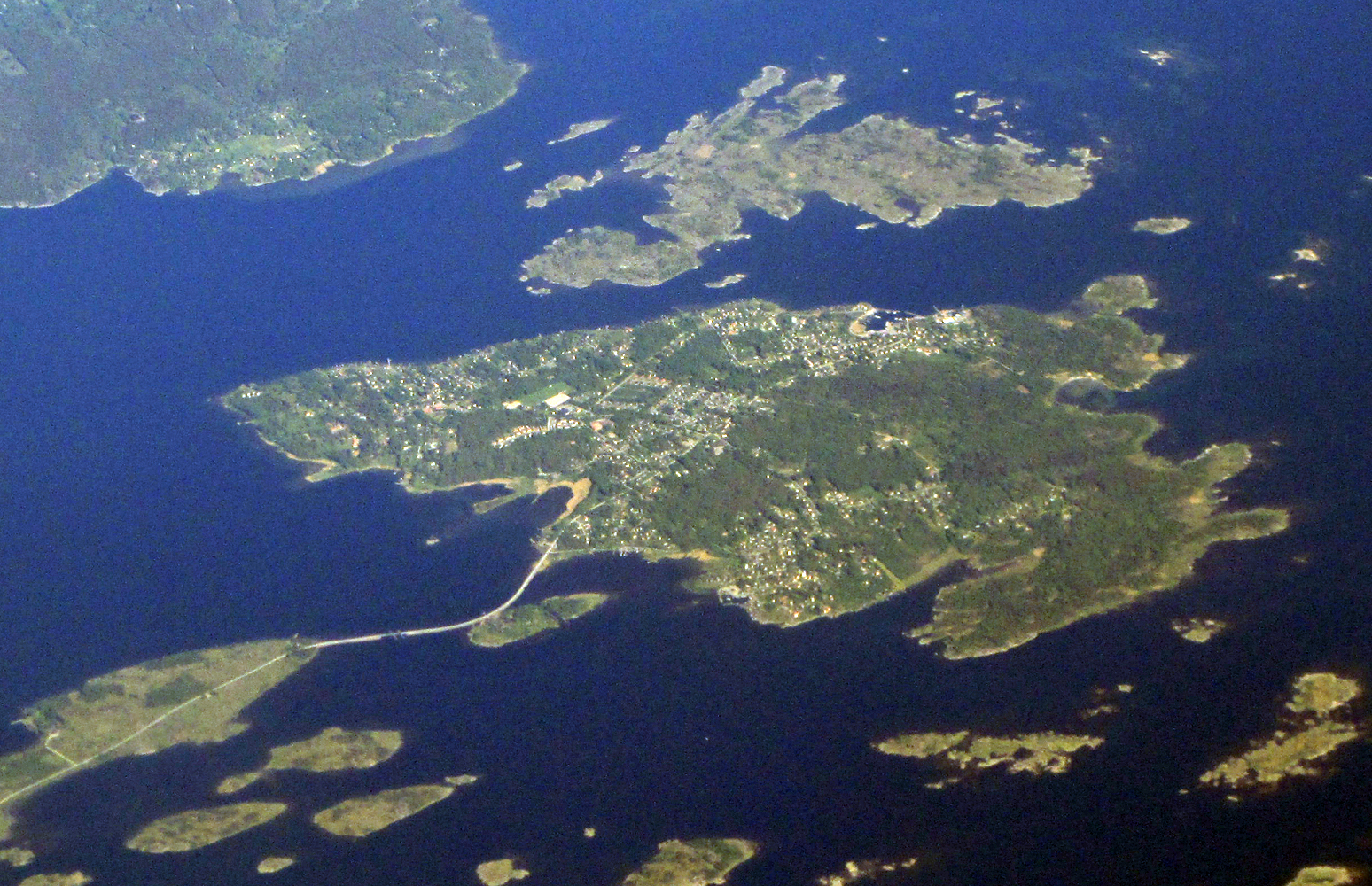
Hasslö Island

For many years, the Swedish navy's activities on Hasslö meant that foreigners' access to the island was restricted, but that is no longer true. Hasslö is famous for its fish, and fishing has historically been the main livelihood. A famous fishing site on Hasslö is the Rallbryggan.

Hasslö is a flat island and most of the people live near the coast. The island is connected to the mainland via the Hasslö Bridge.

Hasslö is the birthplace of the socialist Fabian Månsson (1872–1938), and today there is a statue erected of him on the island.

== Sports ==
The following sports clubs are located in Hasslö:

- Hasslö GoIF
