= Fredrik Ström =

Swedish politician (1880–1948)

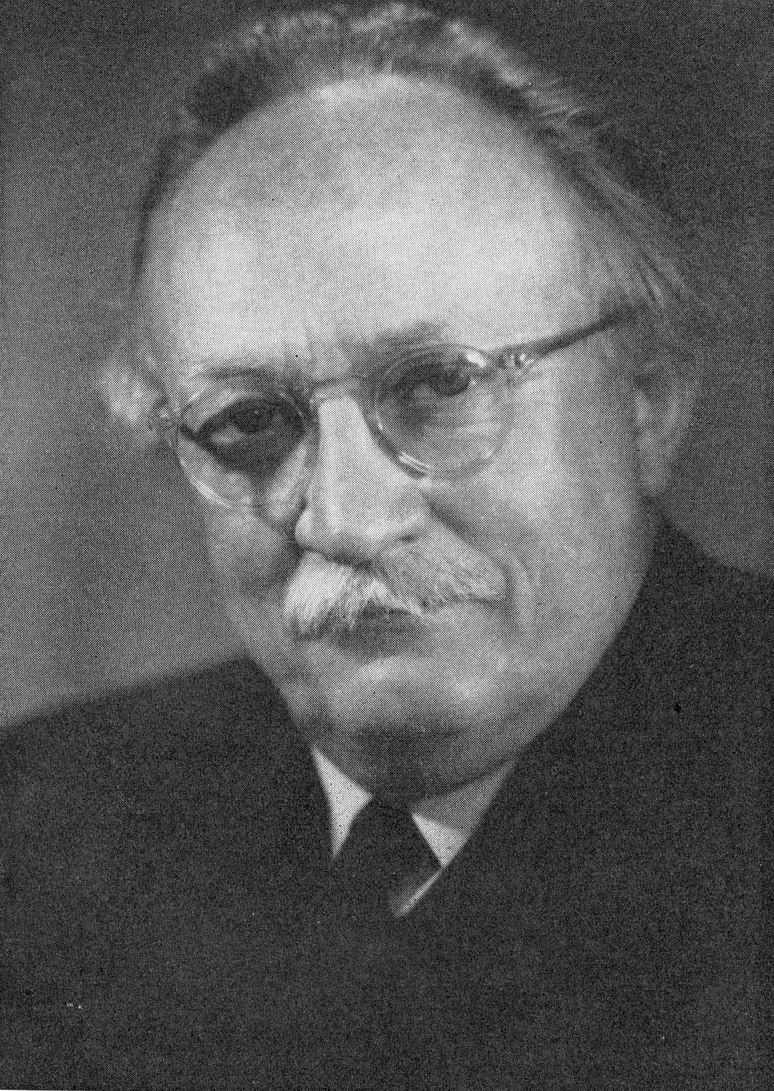
- Fredrik Ström in 1940

Member of the Riksdag
- In office 1930–1948
- In office 1916–1921

Personal details
- Born: 10 July 1880 Halland County, Sweden
- Died: 23 November 1948 (aged 68)
- Party: Swedish Social Democratic Party; Swedish Communist Party (1917–1926)
- Spouse: Tua Ström

Otto Fredrik Ström (10 July 1880 – 23 November 1948) was a Swedish politician, editor and a prolific writer. He held a seat in the Riksdag from 1916 to 1921 and from 1930 to 1948.

He joined the Swedish Social Democratic Party and in 1916 was elected to the Riksdag. However, in 1917 Ström broke with Hjalmar Branting and sided with the far left of the party headed by the communists Zeth Höglund and Ture Nerman. The group supported the Bolsheviks in Russia and would soon become the (original) Swedish Communist Party.

Fredrik Ström was, with Ture Nerman and Stockholm Mayor Carl Lindhagen, part of a small delegation of Swedish communists who greeted Lenin during his short visit in Stockholm in April 1917. The Swedish Communists took Lenin to the PUB department store where they bought him a brand new suit so he would look good returning home to revolutionary Petrograd.

Ström was head of the Stockholm Comintern liaison with Western Europe from 1919 to 1920, and he frequently visited the Soviet Union for meetings including the third congress of the Communist International, held in Moscow in 1921.

Ström supported Lenin, Trotsky and the October Revolution, but he disagreed with Stalinism and in 1926 he found his way back to the Swedish Social Democratic Party, although he still considered himself a communist.

== Works ==
- Fredrik Ström wrote a five-volume history of the Russian Revolution, published in 1924, but it was soon condemned by the new Stalinist leadership in Russia.
- Ström wrote a biography of Kata Dalström in 1930.
- His two-volume autobiography is called Min ungdoms strider (The battles of my youth) and I stormig tid (In stormy times). More volumes were planned, but Ström died before he could write on his life past 1917.
- Fredrik Ström's last book was a biography on Fabian Månsson.
