= PLX Tjärö =

Art festival on Tjärö

- Status: Active
- Genre: Interdisciplinary arts, electronic music, experimental music, sound art, performance art
- Frequency: Annual (August)
- Venue: Tjärö island
- Locations: Blekinge archipelago, Karlshamn Municipality, Sweden
- Coordinates: 56.1599°N 15.0392°E
- Country: Sweden
- Years active: 2017; 9 years ago
- Founded: 2017
- Founder: Kulturföreningen PLX
- Attendance: ~1,500 (2022–2025)
- Organiser: Kulturföreningen PLX
- Website: plxtjaro.com

PLX Tjärö is an art and music festival held on the island of Tjärö in the Blekinge archipelago, Sweden. Organised by the nonprofit Kulturföreningen PLX, the festival has taken place each August since 2017, with the exception of 2020 and 2024.

== History ==
=== Kulturföreningen PLX ===
Kulturföreningen PLX (PLX Cultural Association) is a nonprofit collective based in Malmö and Stockholm, registered in 2015. The collective has been active since approximately 2006, originating as a group from Karlshamn who organised skogsfester (forest parties) in the archipelago. The group later operated a temporary art hall in the Kirseberg neighbourhood of Malmö before launching the Tjärö festival. PLX also operates a record label, PLX Records.

=== Festival origins ===
The first PLX Tjärö was held on 25–26 August 2017, with approximately 30 artists and 700 attendees.

In an interview with Blekinge Läns Tidning, the founders described their connection to Tjärö as dating back to their school years, when visits to the island, including activities such as Trollrundan,(lit. "The Troll Round"), introduced them to the setting. A 2018 article in Vice described PLX as a "sister festival" to the Gagnef festival (2001–2018), noting shared roots in Sweden's underground festival scene.

=== Growth ===
The second edition in 2018, titled PLX Translunar, attracted approximately 800 attendees. By 2019, attendance had grown to approximately 1,000. The 2020 edition was cancelled due to the COVID-19 pandemic in Sweden. In 2021, the festival returned at a reduced capacity of 600, described by Sveriges Radio as "Sweden's largest camping festival" that year.

In 2022, attendance reached approximately 1,500, declared as its maximum capacity. No festival was held in 2024; organisers described the pause as en konstpaus (an art break). The festival returned in August 2025.

== Programme ==
=== Music ===
The programme spans genres including ambient, club music, sound art, experimental jazz, psychedelic rock, electroacoustic music, dub, and performance art. More than 250 artists from over 25 countries have performed since the festival's inception. The 2025 edition featured six stages and over 60 music acts. Named stages include Klippan, Dungen, Satelliten, and Hagen (introduced in 2025).

Notable performers have included Laurel Halo, DJ Assault, Lydia Lunch, Fennesz, Pole, Surgeon, Circle, Shiva Feshareki, Szun Waves, KXP, HNNY, Spunsugar, and Rättö ja Lehtisalo. The festival has been listed on Resident Advisor since 2018.

=== Visual art ===
The art programme is site-specific, with sculptures, light installations, and audiovisual performances placed among the island's rocks, forests, and shoreline. In 2018, the Danish art collective FUKK created Island's Alive: The Voice of Tjärö, a piece combining game, ritual, and mythology. The 2025 edition included 30 exhibiting artists working with light, sound, sculpture, and performance, as well as a pop-up cinema and floating sauna.

== Location ==
Tjärö is a nature reserve and Natura 2000 site approximately 15 km east of Karlshamn. The reserve was designated in 1976 and encompasses approximately 306 hectares. The island is car-free and accessible only by boat, with a 15-minute ferry crossing from Järnavik.

== Organisation ==
Kulturföreningen PLX is registered as an ideell förening (nonprofit association) in Malmö. The festival is organised by its members throughout the year. It has received financial support from Kulturrådet (the Swedish Arts Council), Region Blekinge, and the municipalities of Karlshamn and Ronneby.

== Editions ==
Year	Dates	Attendance	Notes
2017	25–26 August	~700	Inaugural edition
2018	31 August – 2 September	~800	Titled PLX Translunar
2019	August	~1,000	Sveriges Radio broadcast live
2020	—	—	Cancelled (COVID-19)
2021	August	~600	Reduced capacity
2022	18–21 August	~1,500	Maximum capacity reached
2023	17–20 August	Sold out	—
2024	—	—	Paused
2025	14–17 August	~1,500	New stage Hagen introduced

== Reception ==
Nöjesguiden profiled the festival in 2018, noting that artists are "selected based on alignment with PLX values rather than commercial appeal." HYMN's 2019 review praised the booking of "some of Europe's best DJs and avant-garde artists" and highlighted the absence of a printed programme, with attendees discovering stages by exploring the island on foot. In 2022, Record Turnover described the experience as "living in an alternate reality." Region Blekinge's podcast Konst i Blekinge-podden has dedicated two episodes to the festival.

== See also ==
- Blekinge archipelago
- Site-specific art
- Tjärö
