= Aspö, Karlskrona =

Island in the Blekinge archipelago of Sweden

Coordinates: 56°6′52.812″N 15°32′28.233″E

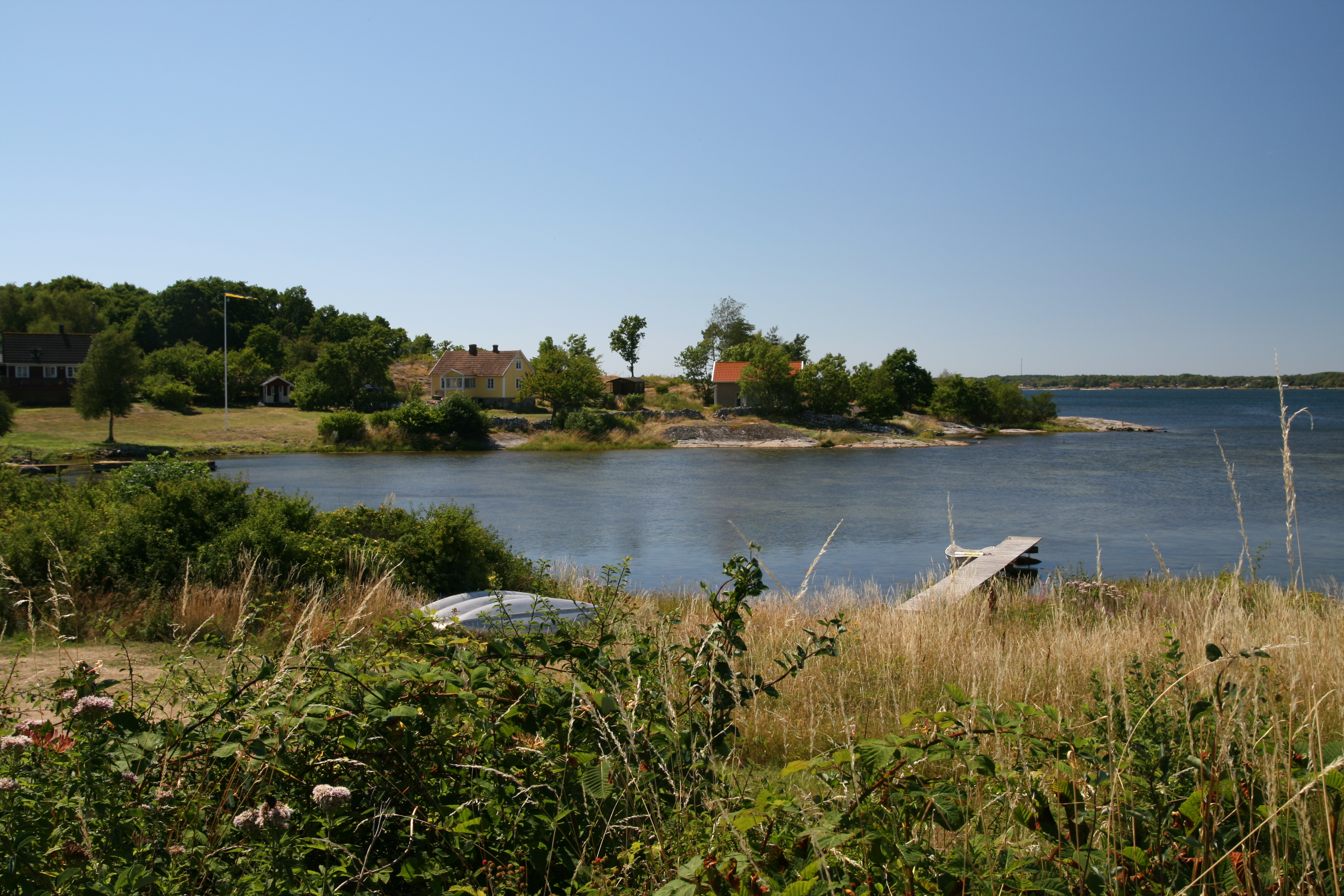
West coast of Aspö

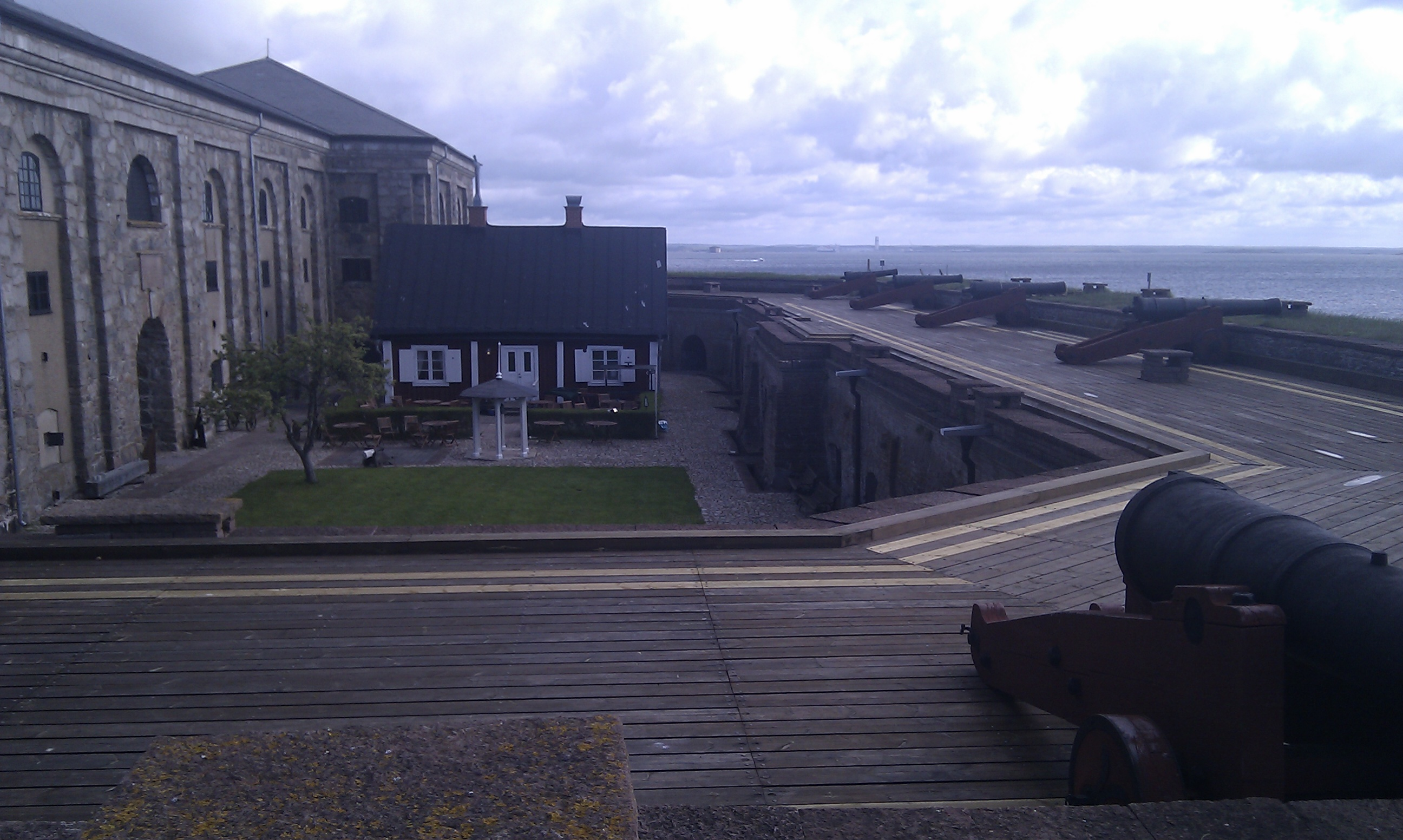
Drottningskär citadel

Aspö is an island in the Blekinge archipelago of southeast Sweden. It constitutes a parish in Medelstad Hundred, Karlskrona Municipality, Blekinge County. It contains the settlement of Drottningskär and a 17th-century naval citadel of the same name. The island has about 460 permanent residents, with many more visitors staying in summer. A ferry for vehicles and passengers runs hourly, free of charge, between Aspö and Karlskrona.

During the Cold War, Aspö was fortified to protect the nearby Karlskrona. Today the island is home to a museum of mobile coastal artillery and other military equipment.

The annual popular art exhibition Konstrundan is one of the more popular events of Aspö and draws a lot of visitors each year.
