= Maria Qvist =

Swedish politician

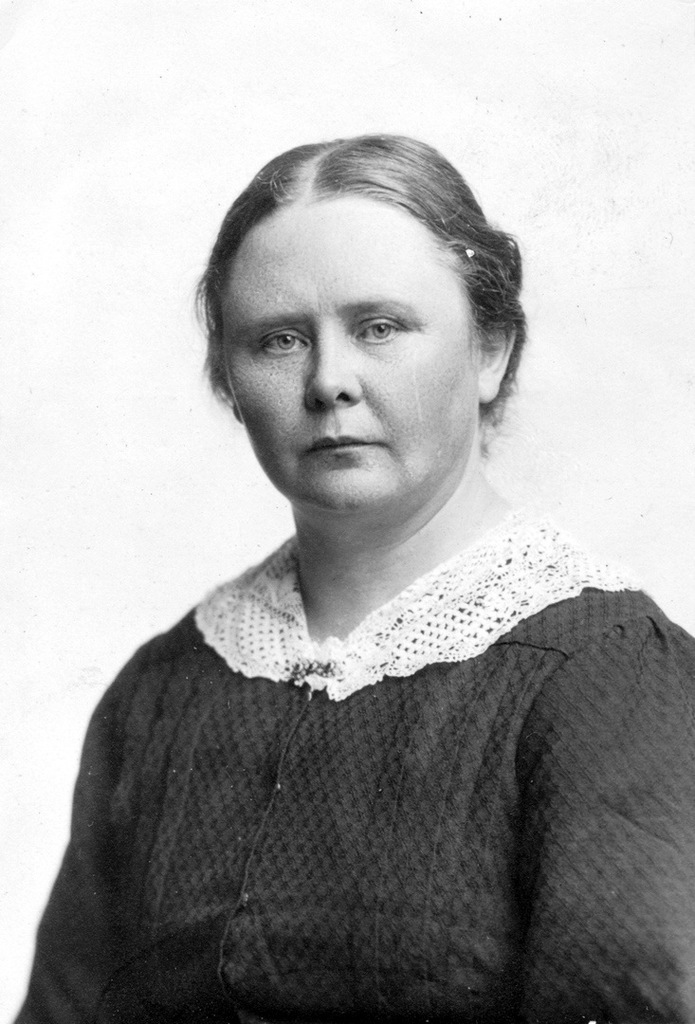
- Portrait of Maria Qvist, 1936
- Born: September 5, 1879; Övraby, Scania
- Died: October 9, 1958 (aged 79)
- Other names: Maria Månsson; Maria Kvist; Maja Månsson
- Occupation: Politician
- Political party: Social Democrats
- Spouse: Fabian Månsson (1924-1938)

Maria "Maja" Månsson (née Qvist, 5 September 1879 – 9 October 1958) was a Swedish politician and active member of the Social Democrats and the party's Youth League.

== Biography ==
Maria Qvist was born as the oldest of 11 siblings; her father was a soldier. Many girls at that time and with similar family backgrounds did not receive a formal education after elementary school. But after school, she visited an introductory course in Malmö for teachers in small, rural schools. Afterwards, she also attended the folk high school Hvilan, the oldest one of these institutions in Sweden. She had to work from the age of 15, mostly as maid or servant in Scania and became a full-time activist at 25.

Her political beliefs lead her to join the Social Democrats and in 1902, the National Association for Women's Suffrage. Together with others, she founded the Female Domestic Workers' Association (Stockholms tjänarinneförening) in Stockholm and became their first chairwoman in 1904. In 1910, she was the first woman elected into the city council of Gävle.

She was especially interested in women's rights and fought for female workers' rights, the limitation of working hours and education for employees.

Around the turn of the century, she got to know Fabian Månsson, a left-wing journalist, writer and former soldier. They started to live together, but were not legally married. That was considered a protest against the contemporary marriage laws, as women lost both responsibility and property when getting married. Their relationship corresponded to a Swedish version of common-law marriage (Samvetsäktenskap). Later in their lives, on Fabian's 50th birthday in 1922, they had the archbishop Nathan Söderblom bless their relationship and married in 1925, after the marriage laws had changed (from 1920 on, married women were no longer under the legal guardianship of their husbands). They shared the same political beliefs: Both were on the board of the Social Democratic Youth League from its foundation on. Maria was also an important contributor to Fabian's work: She researched historical facts, and was proof-reading and type-writing his works.

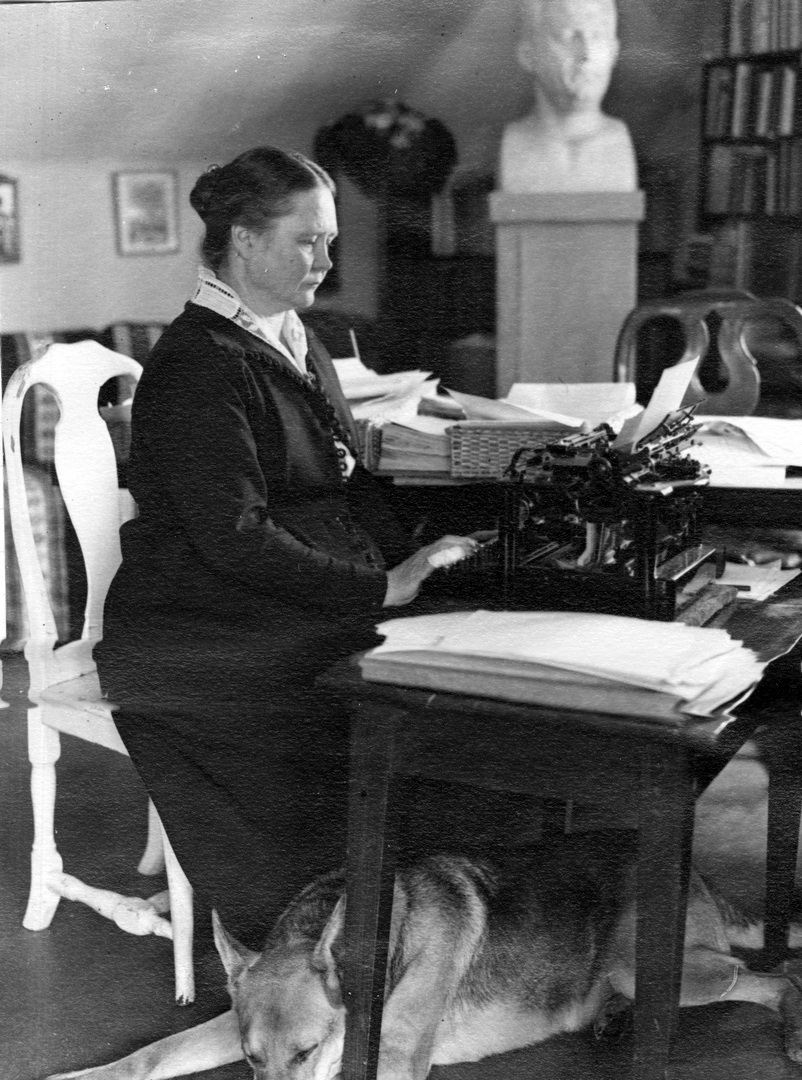
Maria Qvist in her office

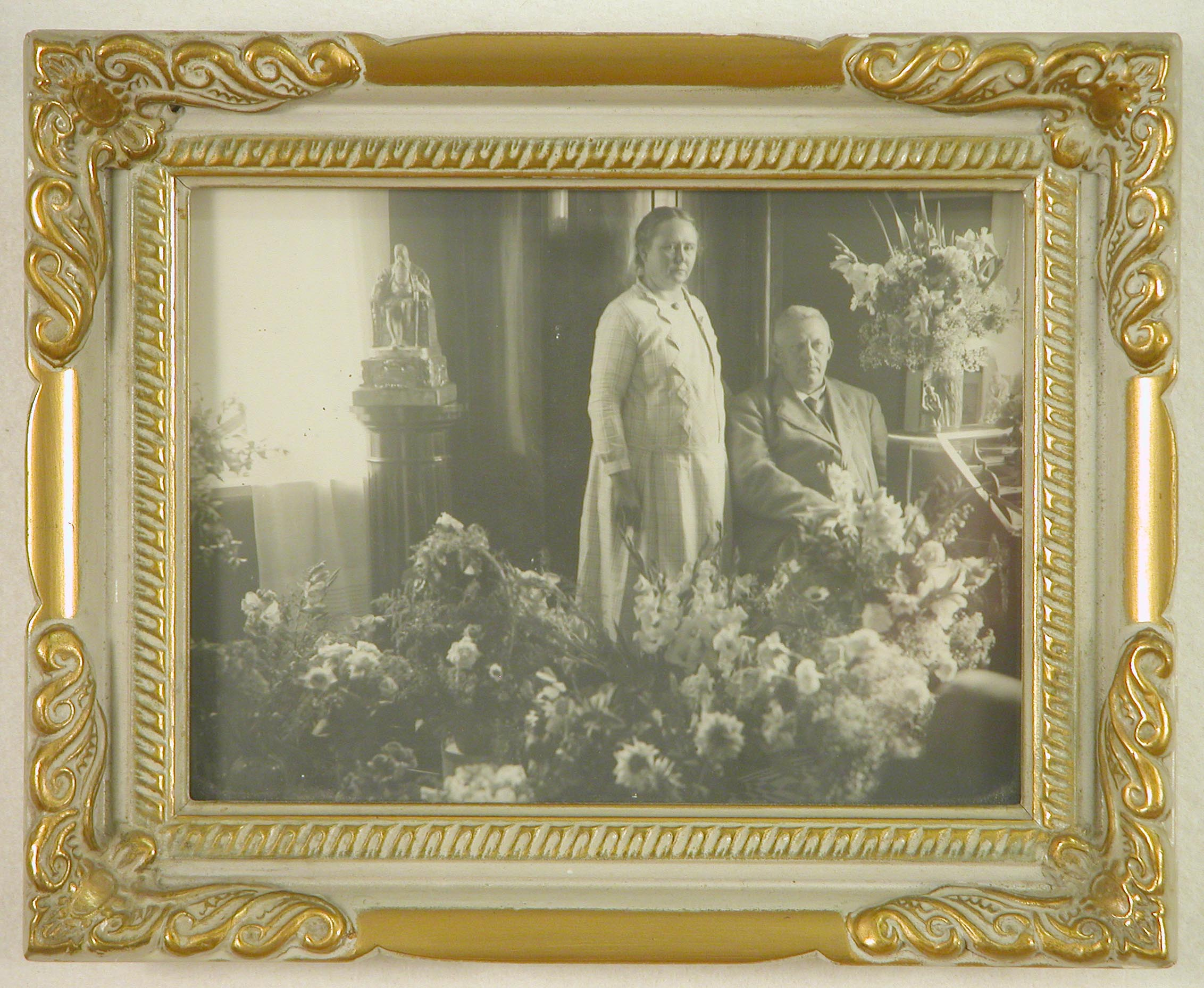
Maria Qvist and her husband on Maria's 50th birthday in 1929

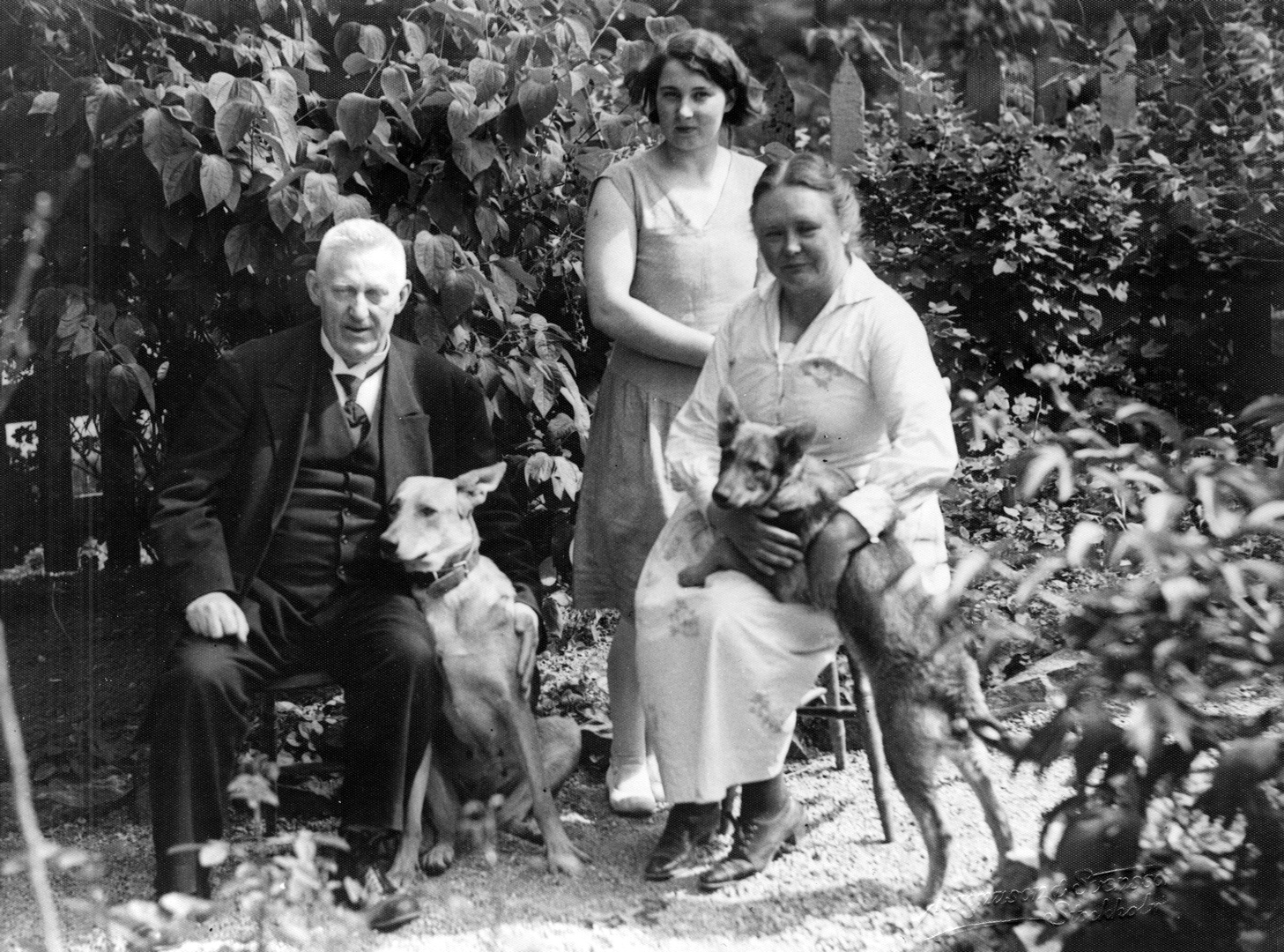
The couple with their maid Rut and dogs in a garden

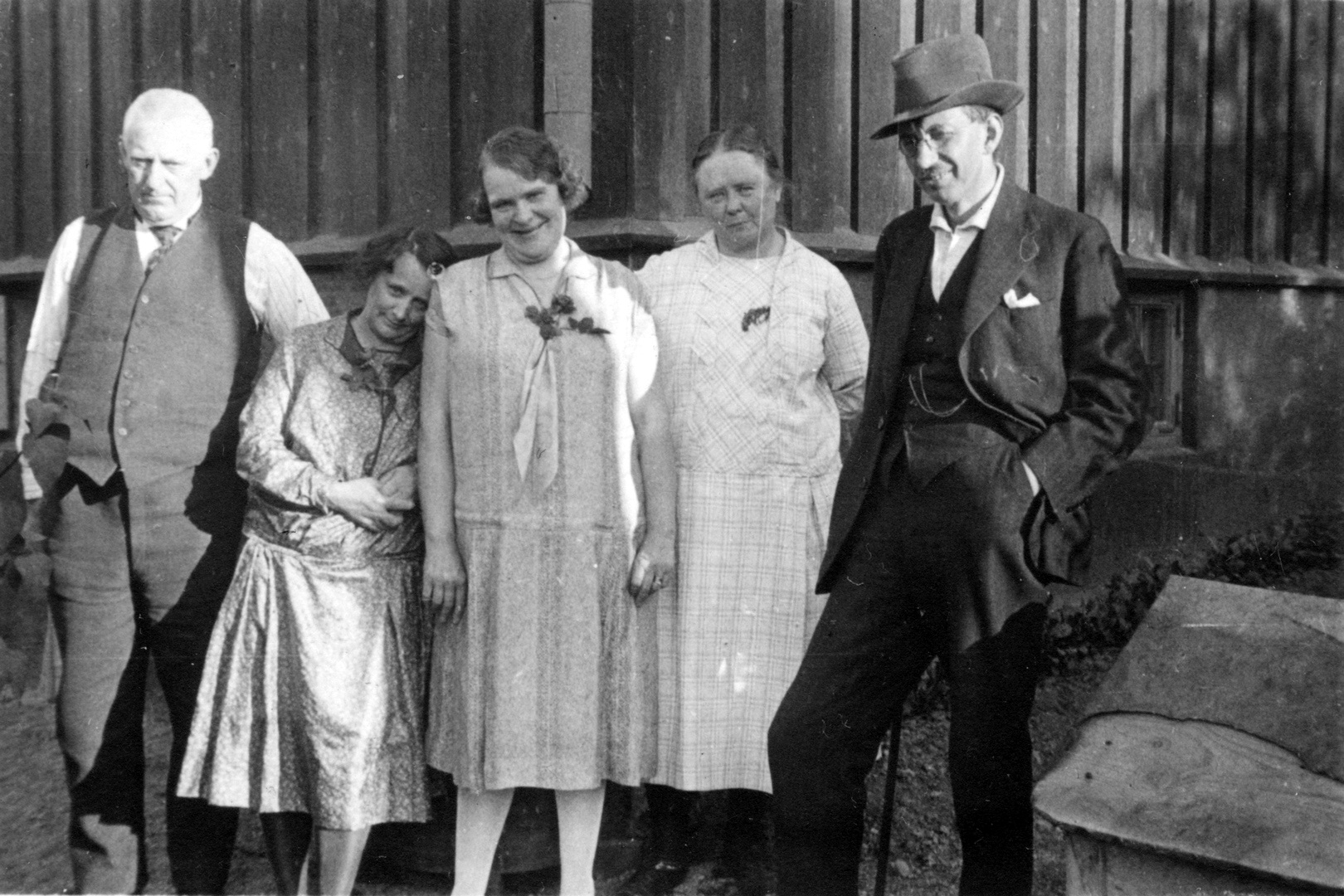
Maria Qvist with her husband and (amongst others) their close friend Zeth Höglund

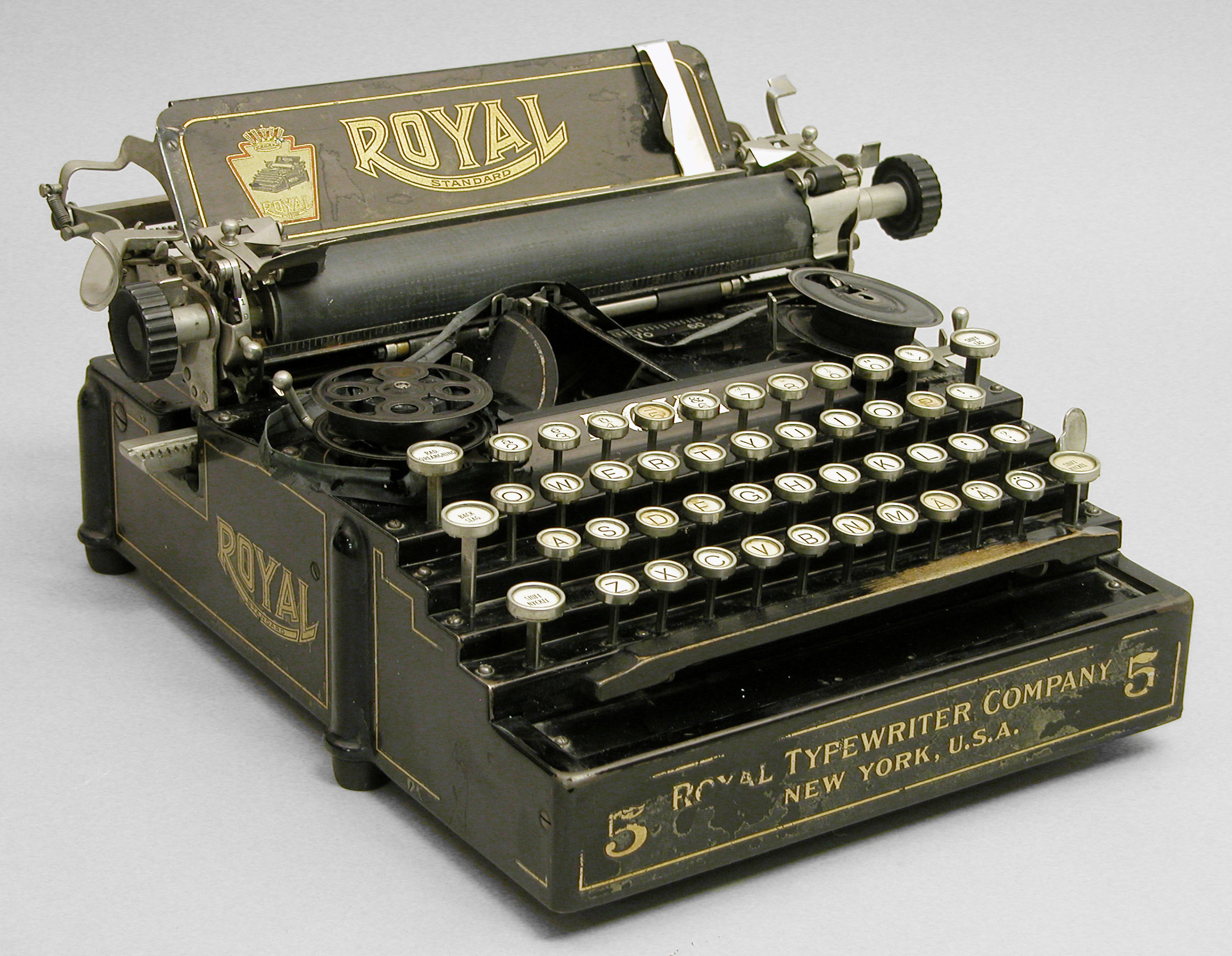
The typewriter Maria Qvist used for her work on Fabian's writings

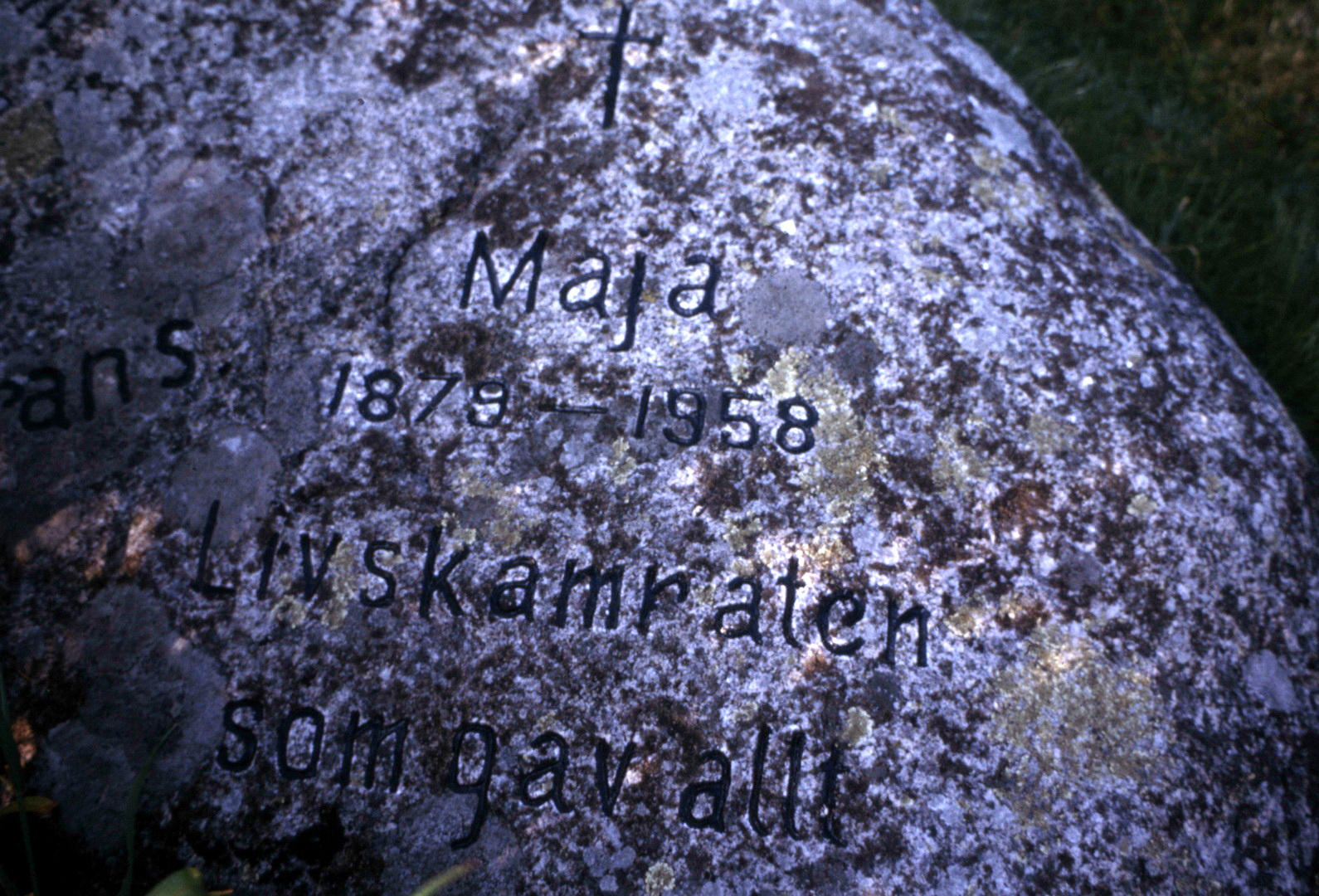
The memorial for both Maria and Fabian Månsson
