= Drottningskär =

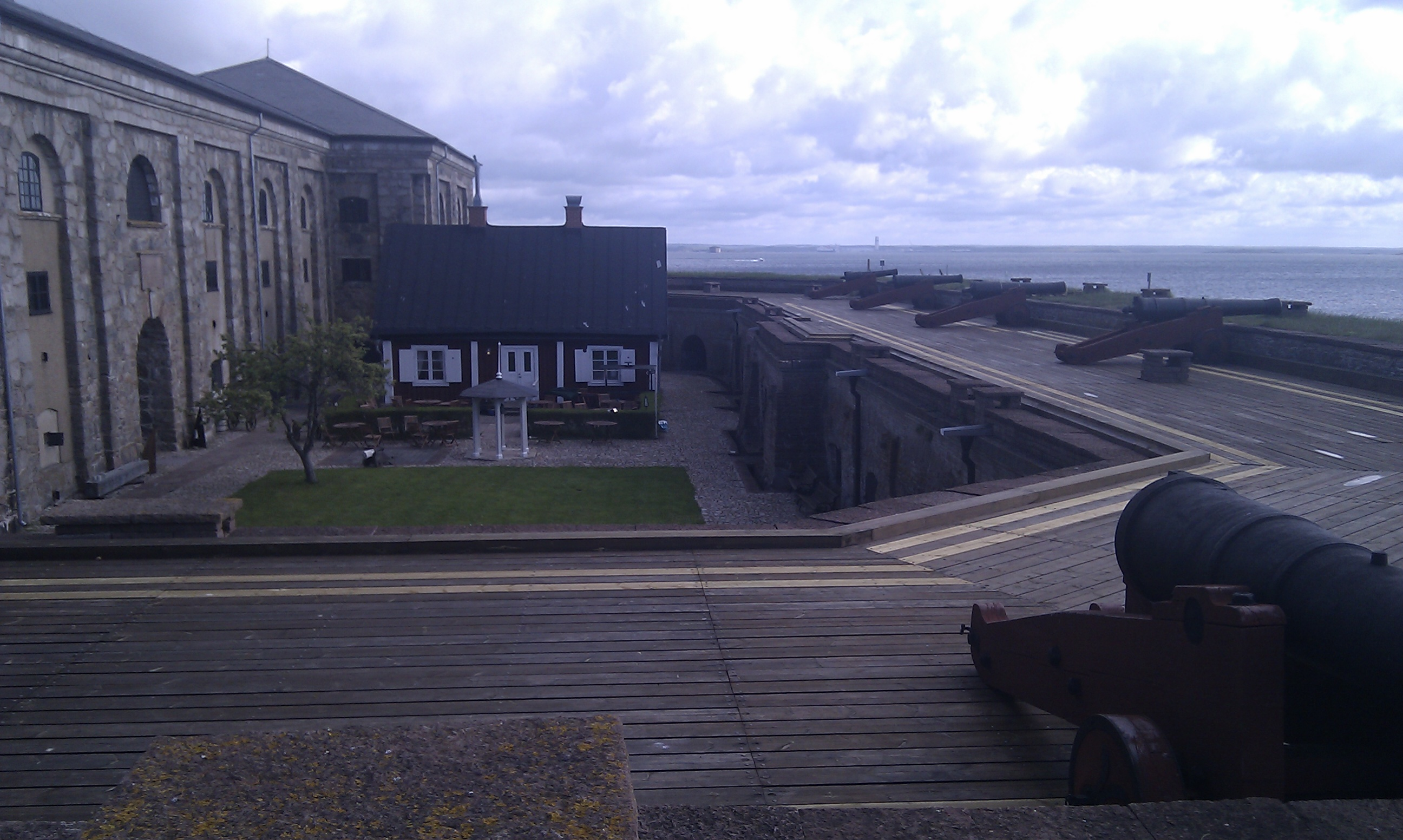
- Drottningskär citadel

- Location within Blekinge Location within Sweden
- Coordinates: 56°07′N 15°34′E
- Country: Sweden
- Province: Blekinge
- County: Blekinge County
- Municipality: Karlskrona Municipality

Area
  - Total: 1.17 km^{2} (0.45 sq mi)

Population (2005-12-31)
  - Total: 328
  - Density: 281/km^{2} (730/sq mi)
- Time zone: UTC+1 (CET)
  - Summer (DST): UTC+2 (CEST)

Drottningskär is a locality situated on the island of Aspö in Karlskrona Municipality, Blekinge County, Sweden with 328 inhabitants in 2005. It gives its name to a nearby 17th-century naval citadel, now part of the Karlskrona naval city World Heritage Site.
