= Stockholm Town Housemaid School =

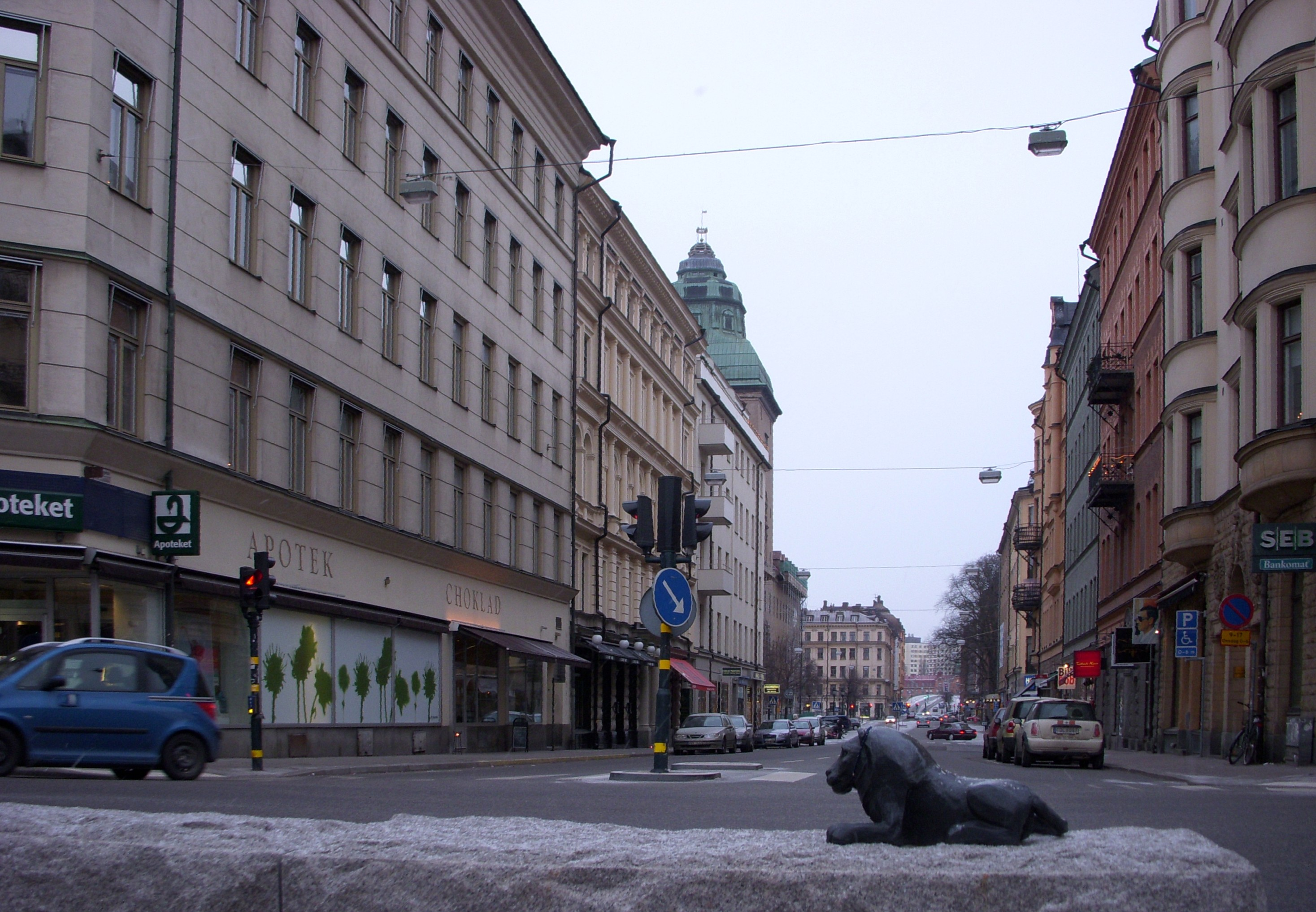
- Scheelegatan in 2008
- Stockholm; Sweden

Information
- Type: Vocational school
- Opened: 1938

The Stockholm Town Housemaid School (Swedish: Stockholms stads hembiträdesskola) was a vocational school started in 1938 at Scheelegatan 8 on the island of Kungsholmen in Stockholm, Sweden. The school educated housemaids.

It was established during a shortage of housemaids, and the idea was well received. It had long been the goal of the Stockholm Housemaid Union to establish such a school. The students were graded, and the classes were photographed wearing housemaid uniforms.

Harald Norbelie has depicted the school in a chapter of the 1993 book Mera gata upp och gata ner: människor och miljöer i Stockholm förr och nu.
