= Grönwall =

Grönwall is a Swedish surname. Notable people with the surname include:

- Erik Grönwall (born 1987), Swedish singer
- Tage Grönwall (1903–1988), Swedish diplomat
- Thomas Hakon Grönwall (1877–1932), Swedish mathematician

== See also ==
- Grönvall
- Grönwalls, a music group from Sweden
- Grönwall's inequality, an inequality in mathematics
