= Gribshunden =

Danish warship sunk in 1495

Coordinates: 56°8′41.2″N 15°13′15.3″E

History

Denmark–Norway
- Name: Gribshunden, Gribshund, Gripshunden, Gripshund, Griff, Griffen, or Griffone
- Owner: King Hans (John) of Denmark and Norway
- In service: 1486
- Out of service: 1495
- Fate: Sank after an explosion in 1495
- Status: Shipwreck

General characteristics
- Propulsion: Sails
- Complement: 4 officers and 25 men, but might have carried up to 150 people total
- Armament: at least 14 wrought iron breech-loading swivel guns, possibly as many as 68 guns

Gribshunden or Griffen (English: "Griffin-Hound" or "Griffin"), also known by several variant names including Gribshund, Gripshunden, Gripshund, Griff, and Griffone, was a Danish warship, the flagship of Hans (John), King of Denmark (r. 1481–1513). Gribshunden sank in 1495 after an explosion while in the Baltic Sea off the coast of Ronneby in southeastern Sweden; the ship is one of the best-preserved wrecks yet discovered from the late medieval period.

== History ==
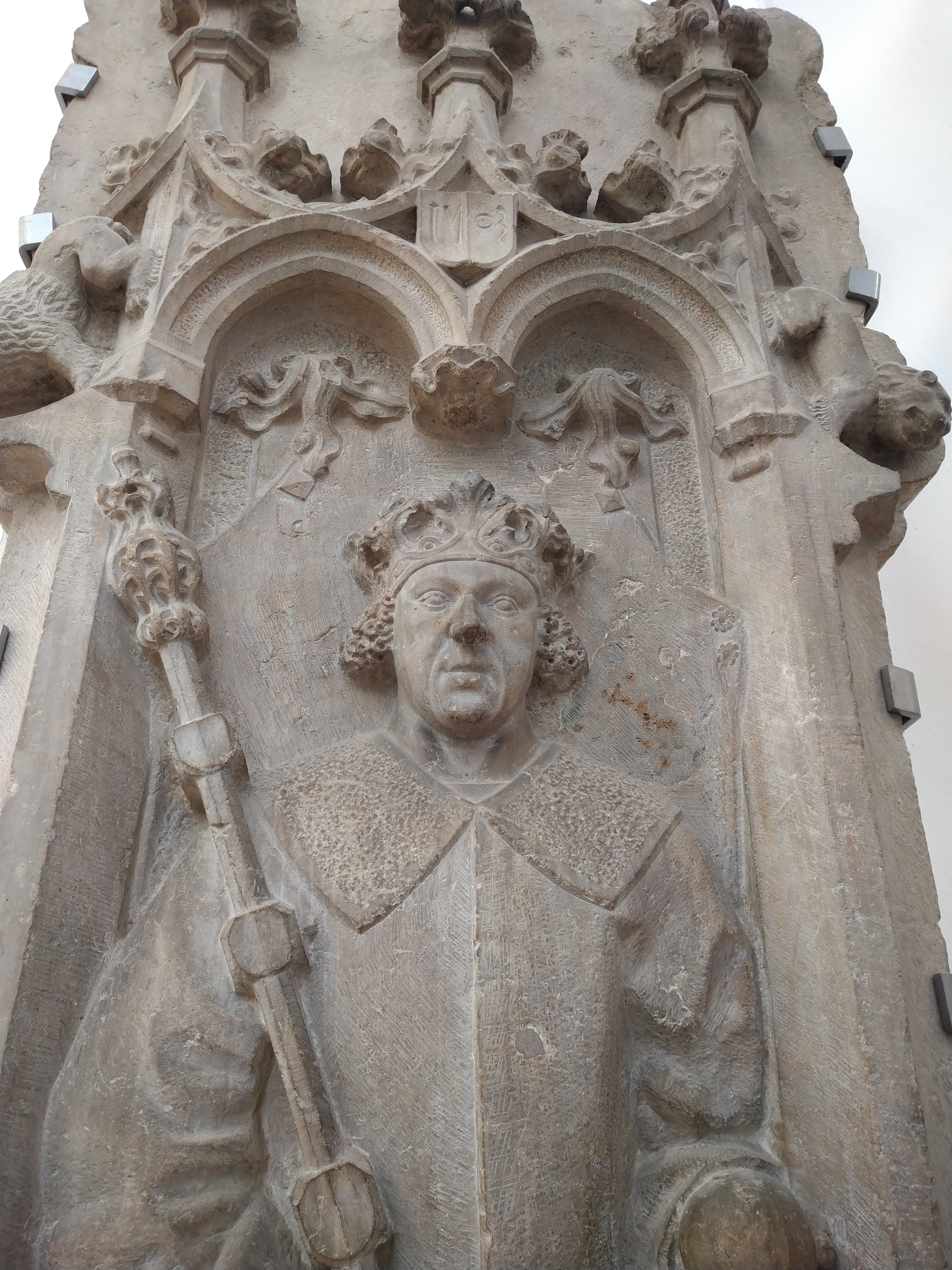
King Hans of Denmark and Norway, depicted on a relief at the National Museum, Copenhagen

The first mention of this ship by name comes from a letter dated 16 May 1486, in which Hans, King of Denmark and Norway, noted his location as "in navi nostra Griffone", Latin for "in our ship Griffon". Gribshunden and its variant names were then subsequently recorded in the Danish fleet's ship lists from 1487 to 1495.

The ship was used frequently by Hans during its ten-year lifespan. Archival documents show the king sailed on the ship to Norway in 1486 and 1490, and to Gotland in 1487. He sent the vessel to England with a delegation to negotiate with Henry VII. In summer 1495, on the ship's final voyage, Hans set sail from Copenhagen for Kalmar, Sweden, for a summit with the Swedish Council. Accompanying Hans was a fleet carrying the Danish and Norwegian Councils, consisting of the high nobility and senior clergymen, and their retinues. This diplomatic effort was necessary because the Swedish leader, Sten Sture the Elder, resisted Hans' efforts to bring Sweden back into the Kalmar Union. As the premier ship of the Danish fleet, Gribshunden and the people and material it carried were symbols of military, economic, cultural, and social power. The vessel was an important aspect of Hans' strategy to convince the Swedes to re-unify with Denmark and Norway.

According to historical accounts, Gribshunden suffered an explosion, burned, and sank at anchor in the natural harbor near the town of Ronneby, Sweden in June 1495 while en route to Kalmar. These accounts include the nearly contemporaneous Swedish Sturekrönikan (The Sture Chronicle) and two later German sources: Reimar Koch's Lübeck Chronicle and Caspar Weinreich's Danzig Chronicle. Hans himself was ashore at the time of the loss and escaped physical injury. However, teenage expedition member Tyge Krabbe remembered twenty years after the event that some of the supposed 150 people on board died in the calamity. Krabbe's account, like the others, must be read critically and not accepted as objective truth. For instance, Krabbe's memory placed the shipwreck in 1494, not 1495; and archaeological investigations have revealed no evidence of fire on the ship. Hans and the fleet continued to Kalmar after the loss of the flagship, but Sten Sture delayed his arrival in Kalmar throughout the summer, finally appearing in August only after Hans and the Danish-Norwegian delegation had departed. The Kalmar Union was temporarily re-established two years later, after Hans' army defeated Sten Sture's forces at the 1497 Battle of Rotebro.

== The wreck ==
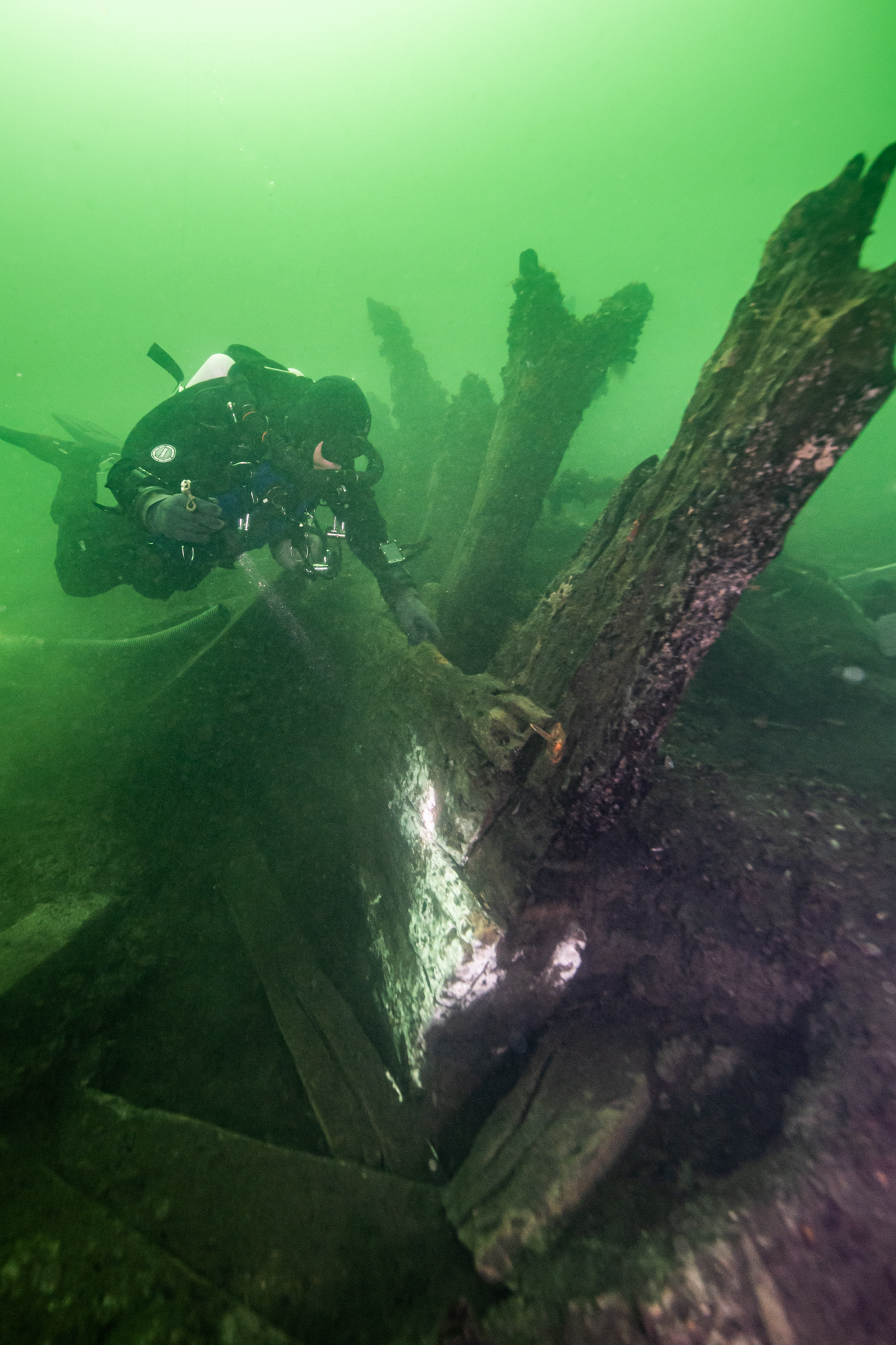
Archaeologist studies the stern of Gribshunden during the 2022 field campaign. Photo: Brett Seymour

The wreck of Gribshunden came to rest on the sea floor with a starboard list of about 27 degrees. Despite disruption from Hans' salvors immediately after it sank and slow natural decay over five centuries, the starboard side of the ship is in good condition from the keel to the first deck, with the starboard superstructure collapsed outboard from that level and preserved in the sediments. While not as intact as Vasa, Gribshunden is the best-preserved warship yet discovered from the late medieval period. This is in part because the wreckage has been left undamaged by shipworm due to the Baltic Sea's brackish waters, measured at 7.7 practical salinity units at the Gribshunden site.

In the 1970s, the local diving club discovered the wreck at a depth of 10 m (33 ft), in the Baltic Sea north of Stora Ekön, an island in the Blekinge archipelago off the coast of Ronneby, Sweden. In 2000 the regional authority in Blekinge county learned that the wreck could be a medieval warship, and mandated archaeological investigations. From 2001 until 2012 archaeologist Lars Einarsson of the Kalmar County Museum conducted a series of activities at the site. In 2002, Swedish naval historian Ingvar Sjöblom tentatively identified the ship as Gribshunden. Subsequent dendrochronological analysis of the ship's timbers showed that they came from oak trees felled in the Ardennes forest along the River Meuse watershed in the winter of 1482–1483, confirming a late medieval date for the wreck. The place of construction is a matter of conjecture, but a shipyard in the Netherlands is a strong possibility: the timber was probably floated down the River Meuse from its harvest point. The Danish king maintained political and trade connections in the Low Countries, he brought Dutch shipwrights to Copenhagen a year after receiving Gribshunden, and in December 1488 he sought to purchase a Dutch-built ship.

Archaeological and historical research indicates Gribshunden was purpose-built as a warship, an example of the first generation of vessels designed to carry gunpowder weapons. The combination of artillery and ships specifically intended to carry these weapons was an essential enabling technology for European domination of the globe after 1492. Gribshunden represents a fusion of Northern European clinker or lapstrake shipbuilding practices with Mediterranean and southern European flush-planked traditions; atop the carvel-built hull is a lightly constructed superstructure of lapstrake planks on frames.

Gribshunden is the oldest carvel hull found in Nordic waters, and marks the transition to the adoption of much larger ships after the late medieval period. Surveys of the wreck indicate the ship had a keel length of 25.5 m (93.5 ft) and an estimated overall length of 32 m (105 ft), with a maximum beam of approximately 8 m (26 ft). Gribshunden perhaps was designed similarly to the vessels used on voyages of exploration in the late 15th and early 16th centuries, and therefore archaeological investigation of this site may provide insights into the ships commanded by Christopher Columbus, Vasco da Gama, and others.

== Site recording and photogrammetry ==
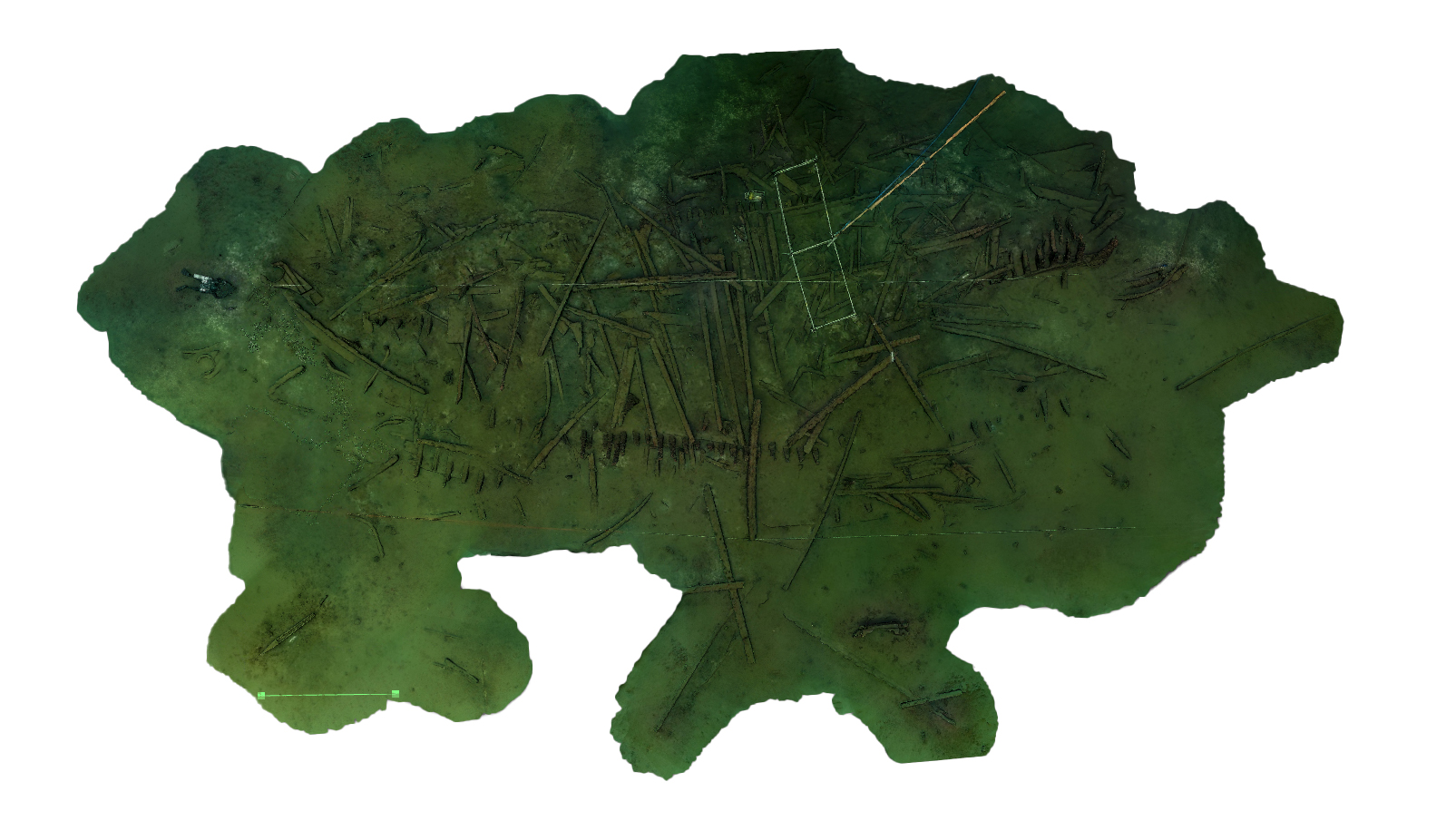
Plan view of Gribshunden 3D photogrammetric model produced by Lund University, Sweden.

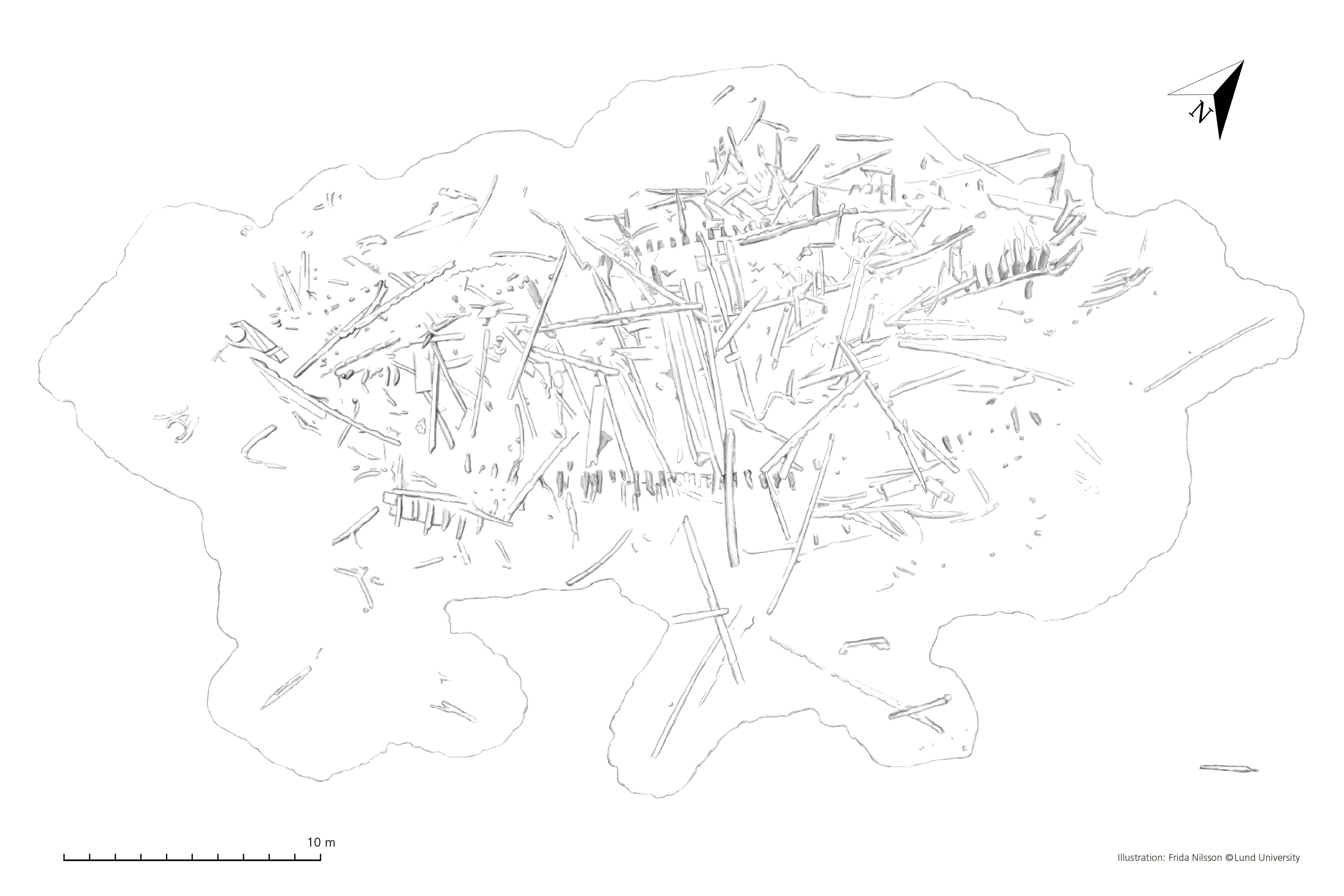
Site plan of the Gribshunden shipwreck, derived from photogrammetric model of the wreck produced by Lund University, Sweden.

Building on earlier investigations on the site, from 2019 new studies of the wreck commenced with collection of photogrammetric data to create a three-dimensional site plan. More than 5000 high-resolution digital images were processed to generate the initial 3D model, from which accurate measurements of the site and its features can be derived. In subsequent field seasons, this 3D plan has been successively updated to create a time-series plan of the excavation trenches to document activities on the wreck. 3D models of selected artifacts are now being re-inserted into the photogrammetric plan of the shipwreck. Ultimately this will deliver an interpretive tool to visualize the spatial relationships among the objects contained in the wreck.

== Figurehead ==
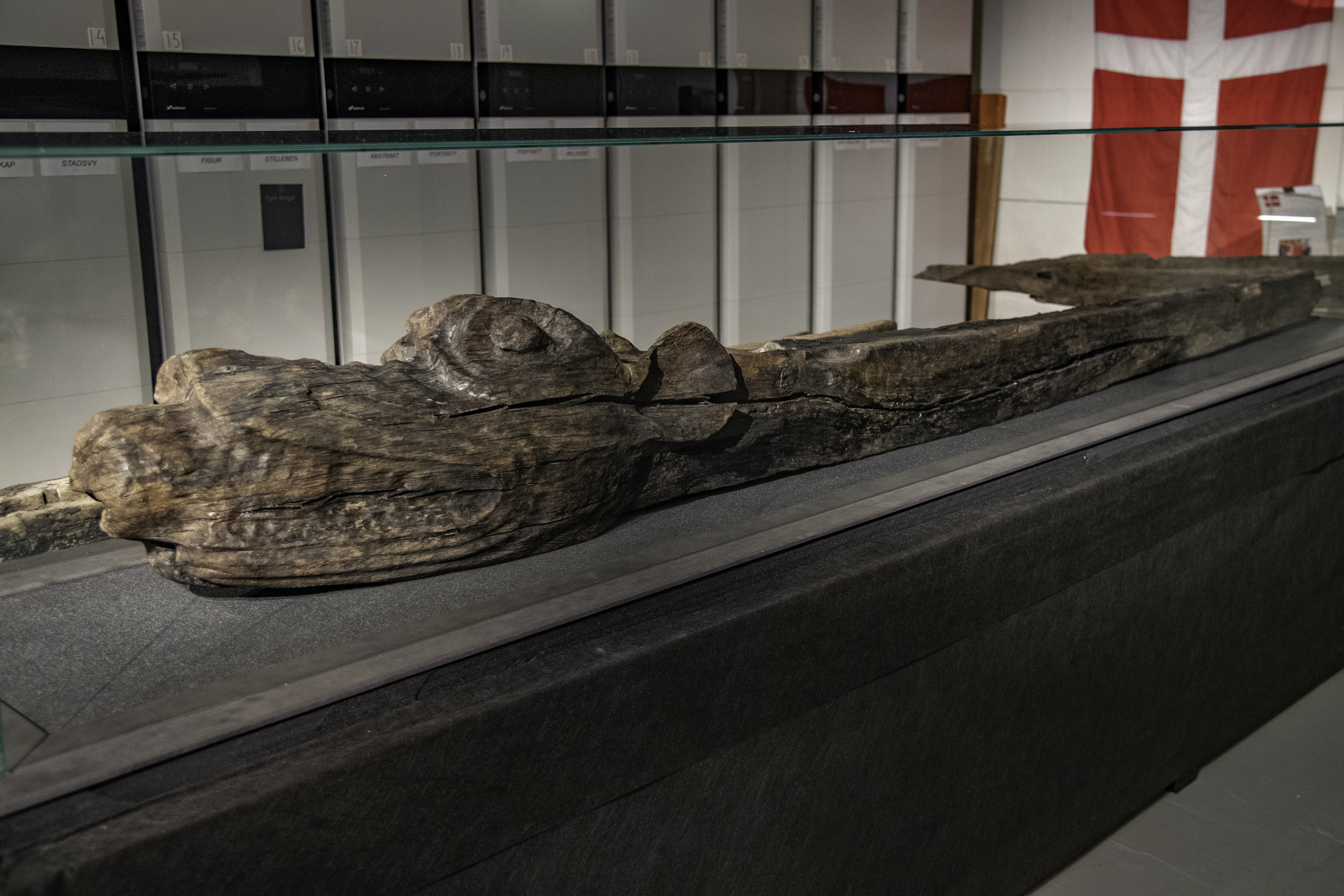
Figurehead of Gribshunden after conservation, displayed at Blekinge Museum, Sweden. Photo: Brett Seymour

In August 2015, the shipwreck's well-preserved wooden figurehead depicting a mythical beast was recovered from the forward part of the wreck. Suggestive of the ship's Gribshunden ("Griffin-Hound") name, the chimeric figurehead is described as a dog-like or dragon-like sea monster with lion ears, devouring a person in its crocodilian mouth. The figurehead was conserved at the Danish National Museum, and is now curated and exhibited at Blekinge Museum in Sweden. The figurehead's motif of a dragon-like monster eating a screaming man is known from late medieval aquamaniles made in the Meuse valley of Lower Lorraine.

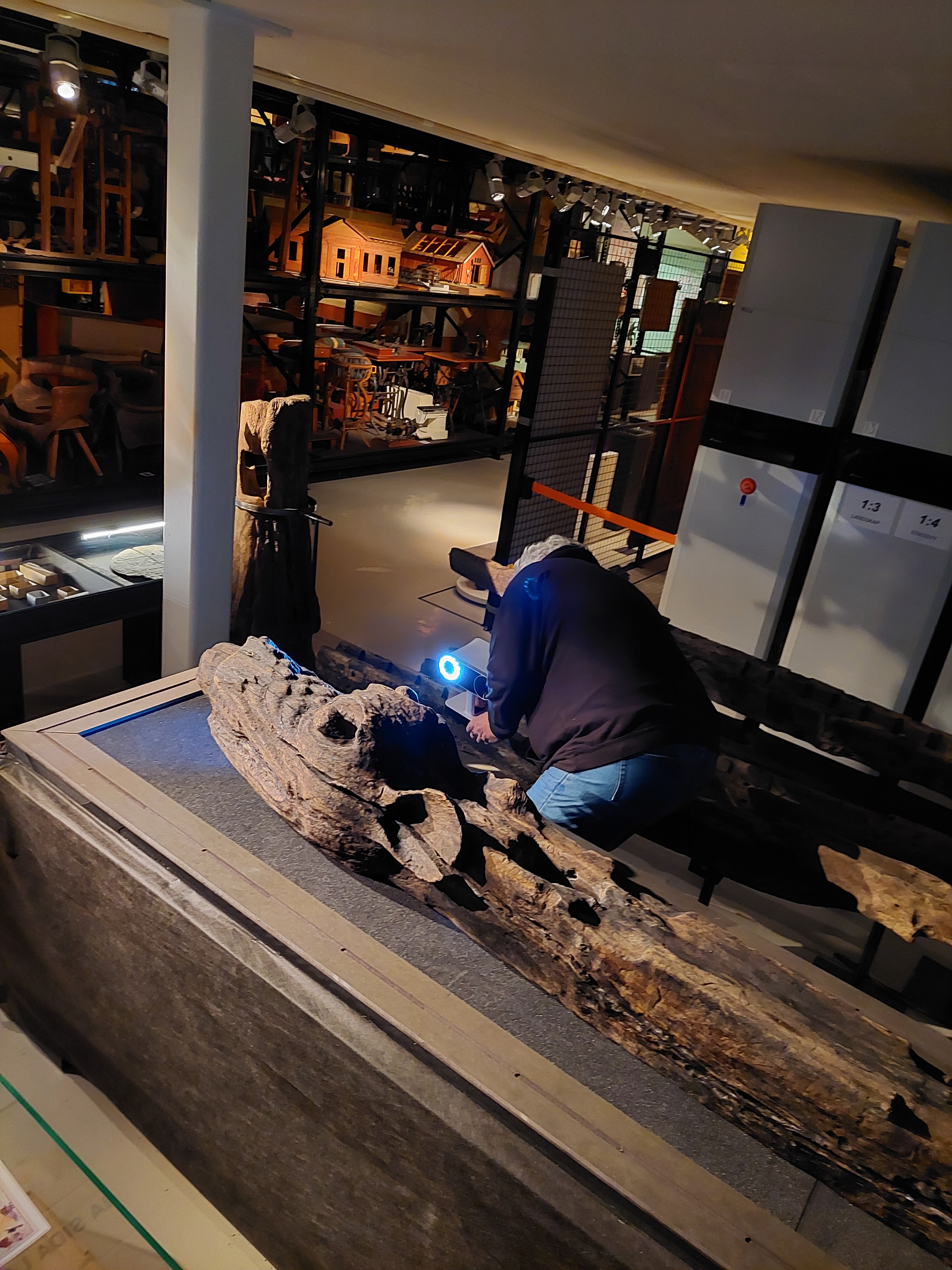
Structured light 3D scanning of Gribshunden figurehead, performed by Lund University at Blekinge Museum, Sweden

== Artillery ==
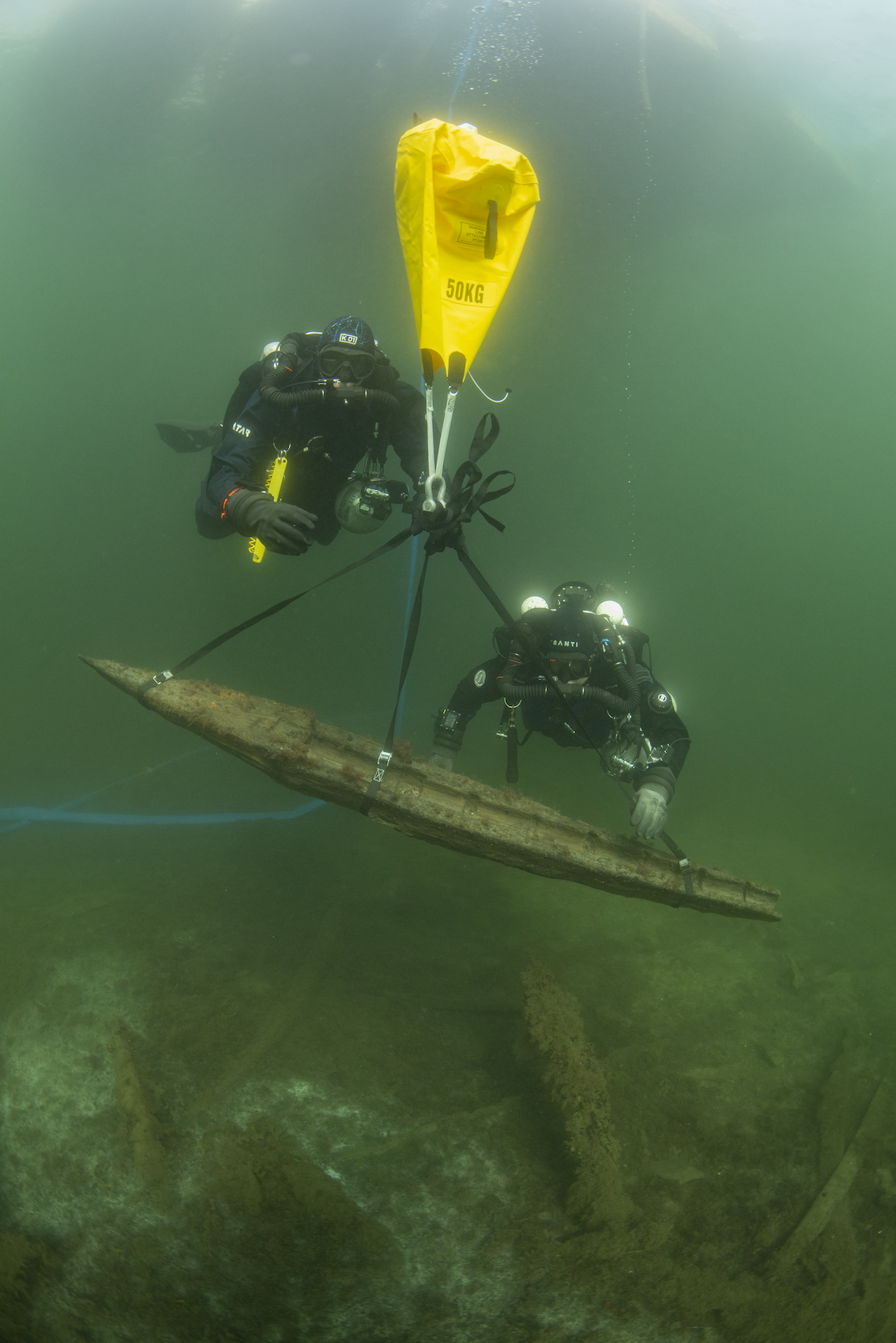
Archaeologists from Lund University recover the wooden bed of an artillery piece from the Gribshunden shipwreck, 2021. Photo: Klas Malmberg

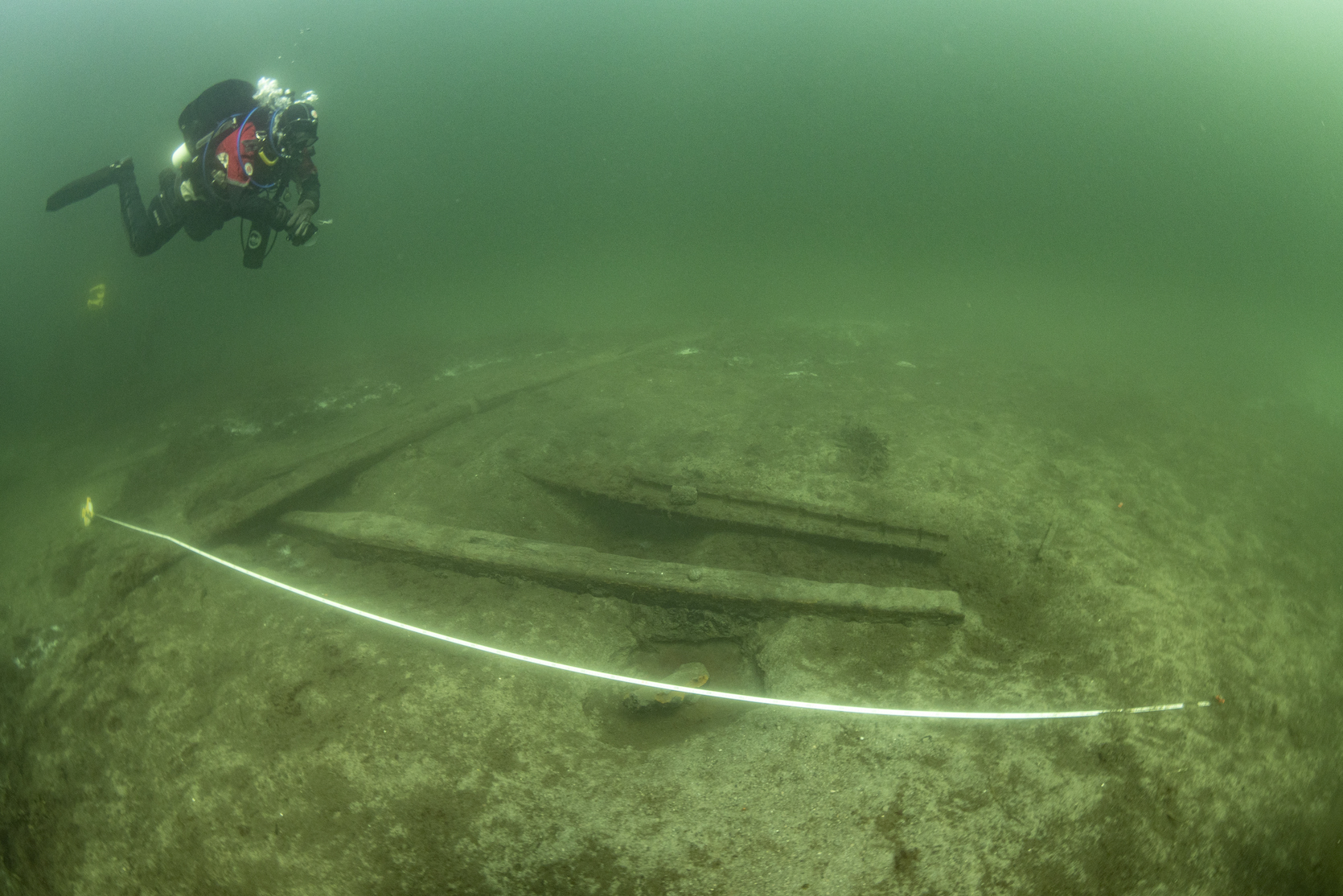
The 4.1 m long artillery piece discovered by archaeologists in 2021 on Gribshunden, with another gun bed placed alongside for comparison. Photo: Klas Malmberg

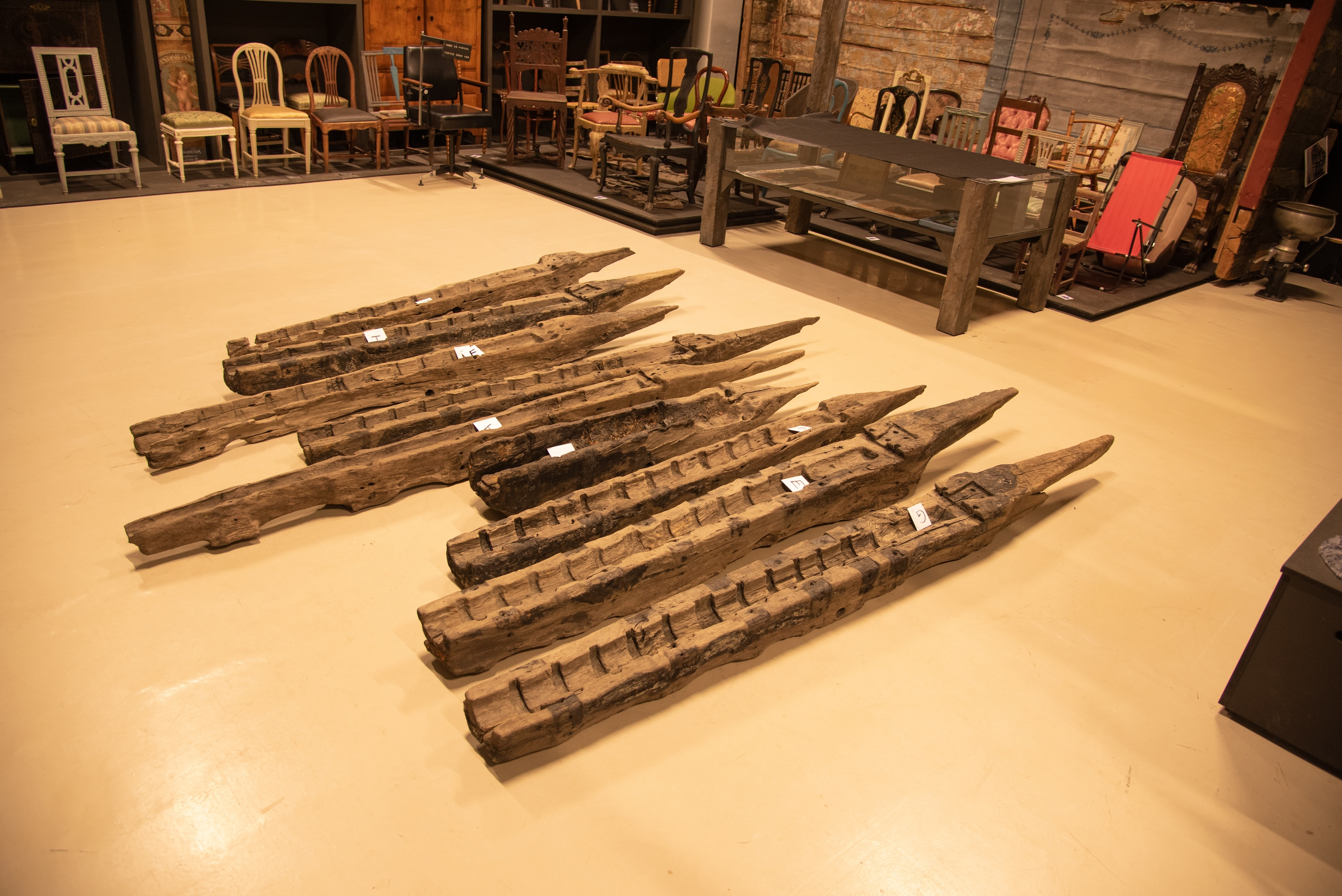
The nine wooden artillery beds recovered from Gribshunden in 2002; after conservation they are curated and exhibited at Blekinge Museum, Sweden. Ten of the wooden gun beds from Gribshunden, recovered 2002 and 2021.

In 2002, archaeologists retrieved nine oak beds for wrought-iron artillery pieces. Since then, archaeologists have identified additional oak gun beds on the wreck, and brought up two more for study and exhibition. As of 2024, fourteen artillery pieces are known from the wreck including three still in situ. Two of those recently discovered guns have their iron gun tubes and breech chambers intact. Identified in 2021, the wooden bed of one of these in situ guns is 4.1 m (13.5 ft) long; this is nearly 50% longer than any of the other gun beds recovered from this wreck. A comparison of Gribshunden's artillery to other late 15th and 16th century shipboard artillery was published in 2025.

Gribshunden's artillery marks an early phase of guns at sea, consisting entirely of light anti-personnel guns not intended for sinking ships. In the decades that followed, larger and more powerful guns came into use on warships such as Mary Rose, the flagship of the English Tudor King Henry VIII. Unlike Mary Rose, Gribshunden never engaged in combat actions during its long career, but its crew did fire the artillery. In 2021 archaeologists discovered the oldest known linstock in the excavation trench, which held the burning fuse used to ignite the artillery's powder charge. Charring on the linstock indicates it had been in use by a gunner.

== Artifacts from excavations ==
Excavations conducted in 2006 and 2019-2022 have delivered a wide variety of both mundane and high-status objects. These include casks coopered on a Danish volumetric standard containing common foodstuffs such as beef, fish, and beer, but also one cask containing a locally-caught 2-meter long butchered sturgeon, which was a species reserved for the king.

The 2021 excavation revealed remains of eight crossbows, dozens of crossbow bolts, a unique tripod quiver, and the stock of a second handgonne (early handheld firearm). These finds join the crossbow and handgonne stock recovered in 2019, and several crossbow bolts recovered in 2006 and 2019. An assortment of personal possessions consist of parts of leather shoes and belts, buckles, a comb made from boxwood, a turned wooden plate and a stave-built cup.

High status artifacts include a purse of silver coins, two extraordinary identical pressure-printed works of art on birch bark, a tankard milled from alder wood and emblazoned with a crown-like symbol, and exotic spices and foodstuffs including clove, ginger, saffron, pepper, and almonds. Intriguingly, one wooden ink blotter with a presumed deerskin covering and the handle of a second example are indications that on the final voyage, documents were written on board. These blotters might have been used by the ship's officers, or by a royal scribe like the one who penned the 16 May 1486 letter first referring to Gribshunden.

A 2021 episode of the American science show NOVA profiles the 2019 underwater archeological investigation of Gribshunden.
