= Stockholm Housemaid Union =

Trade union in Sweden for female domestic workers

- Stockholms hembiträdesförening
- Founded: 1904
- Dissolved: 1970
- Location: Sweden
- Members: 100 (1904)
- Key people: Maria Qvist, Hanna Grönvall

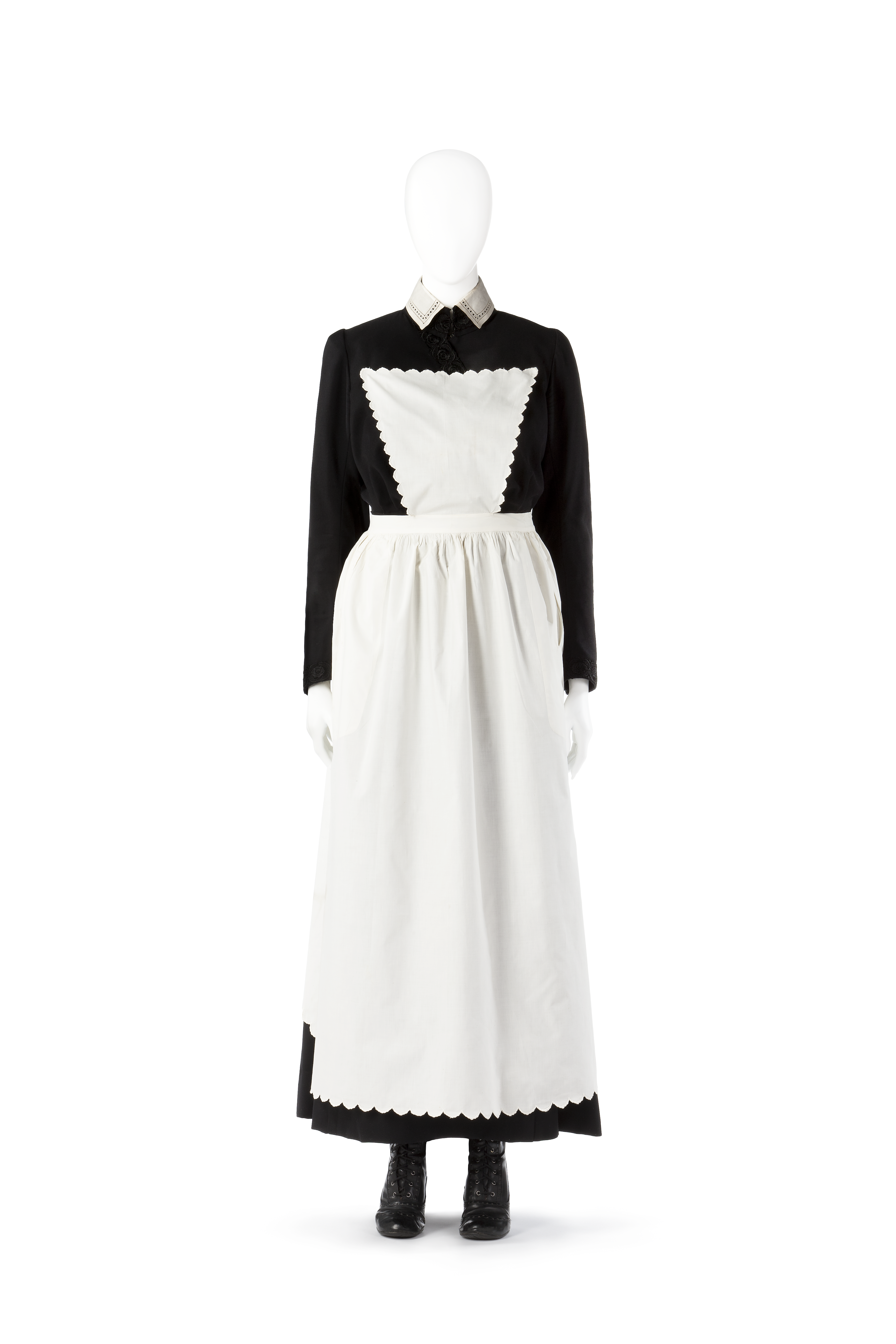
Swedish housemaid's uniform, 1910s

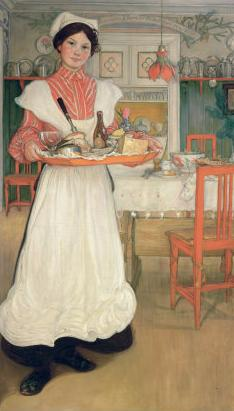
Carl Larsson's 1904 painting "Martina med frukostbrickan" (Martina with a breakfast tray)

The Stockholm Housemaid Union (Swedish: Stockholms hembiträdesförening) was a trade union in Sweden organizing female domestic workers between 1904 and 1970. Its members were generally housemaids, but the union also included other waged women workers in the domestic sphere, such as nurse maids and nannies. In the year of its foundation, the union had 100 members.

Originally founded under the name Stockholms tjänarinneförening (Stockholm Union of Female Servants), the name was changed in 1917 to reflect a professionalisation of the work; from the old-fashioned tjänarinna ("female servant") to the more modern appearing hembiträde ("house maid", literally "home assistant").

== Foundation ==
The background was the organization of women in the trade union and labor movement in Sweden from the 1880s onward. The Women's Trade Union was founded in 1902, and during a meeting in Stockholm in 1903, its president Anna Sterky spoke of the female domestic servants, whom she compared to slaves and encouraged to organize in a union of their own and raise their voice to improve their conditions. Her speech resulted in an intense public debate.

The housemaid, trade unionist and social democrat Maria Qvist had met the Danish trade unionist Karen Marie Christensen, who had started a trade union for housemaids in Denmark, Københavns Tjenestepigeforening, and on 4 January 1904, Maria Qvist founded the Stockholm Housemaid Union with its Danish equivalent as a role model.

The Stockholm Housemaid Union published its own newspaper. In its first edition, it described its foundation thus:

"When the movement for female servants started here in Stockholm and an association was formed, it was met, as could be expected, by the most intense opposition by their mistresses; there was in fact almost a competition to paint the association for female servants in the darkest colors. It is easy to understand, that the purpose was to suffocate the movement in its cradle, which fortunately did not succeed. Us female servants, who had dared to form an association despite the opposition, were fully aware that if anything were to be achieved, energetic work and most of all endurance was required".

The most important five goals of the association was given as:

1. to provide information and education to housemaids via methods such as courses and lectures;
2. to introduce clear scheduled working hours, since many housemaids lived with their employers, which resulted in them being in practice always at work and deprived of regulated free time;
3. to introduce formal written working contracts and resignation forms instead of the informal agreements that were the most common at the time;
4. for the association to function as an employment agency (which would enable them to control that the regulations they introduced were followed);
5. the foundation of a housemaid school to give housemaids a formal education as such (and thereby raise the status of the profession).

== 1904-1929 ==
During the first twenty five years of its existence, the Stockholm Housemaid Union experienced major difficulties, and was not able to achieve much.

The first and the 4th goal of the association was swiftly reached. The courses and lectures held by the Housemaid Union became very popular and well attended by housemaids from the start, since they provided a rare opportunity for women of low education and schooling to learn about different subjects. Also the 4th goal met with little difficulty. Since almost everything regarding the housemaid profession had until then been informal, the employers of housemaids also found it practical to have an employment agency to turn to rather than rely on recommendations, and already in 1905, the Stockholm Housemaid Union successfully functioned as an employment agency for housemaids.

However, the remaining goals of the association met with compact resistance. The 5th goal met with little enthusiasm from housemaids themselves, since they generally viewed their profession as a temporary job rather than a chosen profession. The second and third goal was not accepted by the employers of housemaids. The housemaid profession was in many ways an informal one. Housemaids were employed by informal recommendations between employers; it was normal for them to live in the home of their employer, which made their working hours, tasks and conditions almost entirely dependent on their employers. The employers had no organization which the Stockholm Housemaid Union could negotiate with; the individual employers – often a married housewife – was not willing to negotiate about an issue they considered their private family matter, and the regulation of a profession practiced in a private residence was met with numerous difficulties.

There were several reasons to why it was difficult to organize housemaids. One reason was that working hours were so long and the free time so limited that few housemaids had the time to engage in union work; another was that the majority of housemaids regarded their profession to be a temporary job that they would leave as soon as they was given an alternative, and they therefore lacked an interest in the profession.

Furthermore, the Swedish trade union movement had a difficulty in categorizing the housemaids in their movement, since the Women's Trade Union defined the working-class woman as an industrial worker, a category in which the housemaids could not be included. These difficulties were not fully resolved until the late 1920s.

Aside from their main task, the Stockholm Housemaid Union did show an interest in non-related issues for women's rights; in 1906, their newspaper participated in the mass petition for women's suffrage in Sweden organized by the National Association for Women's Suffrage.

== 1929-1944 ==
The movement started to pick up pace and become more successful in the 1930s. A major figure in resolving the difficulties were Hanna Grönvall, who was the secretary in 1910-1914 and the Chairperson in 1914-1941. Grönvall was herself a housemaid, but also an elected member of the Stockholm City Council for the Social Democratic Party from 1919, and was thus in a position to both integrate the Housemaid Union in the Social Democratic worker's movement, the trade unions as well as forward its demand in the City Council via her contacts. In 1929, the Stockholm Housemaid Union became a member of the Stockholms Fackliga centralorganisation (Literary: 'Central committee of the Stockholm Trade Unions') which in turn made them a member of the Swedish Trade Union Confederation, something which gave them financial security.

The victory of the Social Democratic Party in the 1932 election was beneficial to worker's rights and trade unions. This also helped the breakthrough for the Stockholm Housemaid Union. In the mid 1930s, a state investigation of the National Board of Health and Welfare, in which Hanna Grönvall was a member, reported that the housemaid profession had "such a low status that it was barely given any human value". Despite the efforts of the Stockholm Housemaid Union to raise the status of the profession with education, it was hard to improve the conditions of a job performed in people's private homes; employers decided for themselves whom to employ and under what terms and ignored the regulations the Union tried to impose, and it continued to be hard to expand the membership numbers when the housemaids themselves preferred to leave the profession as soon as possible and most housemaids thus only viewed it as a temporary job.

Until the 1930s, the Swedish house maid union consisted of several local unions among which the Stockholm Housemaid Union was the dominant, but lacked a central national organization. In 1936, the Chair of the Stockholm Housemaid Union, Hanna Grönvall, founded and became the President of the first national housemaid union, the Hembiträdesföreningarnas centralkommitté (Literary: 'Central committee of housemaids'), which sent out Viola Sandell on tours to organize local branches all over the country; this finally increased the membership number and made it a major force in the ongoing campaign for a regulation of the housemaid profession. In 1938, the housemaids arranged a demonstration to limit working hours to eight hours a day, pointing out that their profession belonged to the worst of all, in a time period when conditions improved for most professions during the Social Democratic government. The same year, in 1938, the Stockholm Town Housemaid School was founded.

In 1944, the ongoing demands of the Housemaid Union was finally met in the Hembiträdeslagen ('Housemaid Law'), which ensured a number of rights for housemaids which had long been requested by their union, such as their own room in accordance with health regulations, set working hours and paid vacation. This was a major victory. Thereby, the housemaid profession had formally reached similar working conditions as other professions.

== 1944-1970 ==
However, after the World War II, the housemaid profession swiftly started to die out in Sweden. In the 1950s, as the expanding Swedish welfare state system offered more and more secure and well-paid state jobs to women who would otherwise have worked as housemaids, the number of housemaids started to disappear as a profession in Sweden in parallel with the increasing number of attractive alternatives, since no one wanted to work as a housemaid when given an alternative.

In 1958, the number of housemaids in Sweden was already so few that the national union of housemaids dissolved itself because of the rarity of the profession; the biggest local branch, the Stockholm Housemaid Union, had also de facto almost stopped their activity in the 1950s, and met again in 1970 only to dissolve, since the number of housemaids was by then so few that there was no longer a need for it.

== Publication ==
In 1905, the Women's Trade Union began publishing Tjänarinnebladet ('The Female Servant's Leaf'). It was however discontinued in 1908.
