= Hanna Grönvall =

Swedish politician and trade union worker

Johanna Kristina "Hanna" Grönvall (10 December 1879 in Västra Sallerup, Malmöhus län – 22 May 1953) was a Swedish politician (Swedish Social Democratic Party) and trade union worker. She played a major role in the improvement of the working conditions for domestic workers as the President of the Stockholm Housemaid Union and the co-founder of the national house maids trade union.

== Life ==
Grönwall was born to the blacksmith Nils Grönvall and Petronella Nilsson. She worked as a house maid from 1900 until 1934. She eventually settled in Stockholm, and became a member of the Swedish Social Democratic Party and engaged in the working union.

She was the secretary of the Stockholms hembiträdesförening (Stockholm Housemaid Union) 1910-1914 and its chair in 1914—1941. As the Chair of the Stockholm Housemaid Union, she took the initiative to the foundation of the first national trade union for house maids in Sweden, the Hembiträdesföreningarnas centralkommitté (Housemaid Union's Central Committee), in 1936.

Grönwall was a Member of the City Council of the Stockholm Municipality in 1919–1938. As a Politician she was engaged in the improvement of the rights of domestic workers. She was a member of the state committee for the working conditions of the house maids.

== Sources ==
- Sveriges dödbok 1947–2006, (Cd-Rom), Sveriges Släktforskarförbund
