= Blekinge archipelago =

Chain of islands in the Baltic Sea

Coordinates: 56°08′N 15°29′E

Designations

Ramsar Wetland
- Official name: Blekinge skärgård
- Designated: 14 November 2001
- Reference no.: 1115

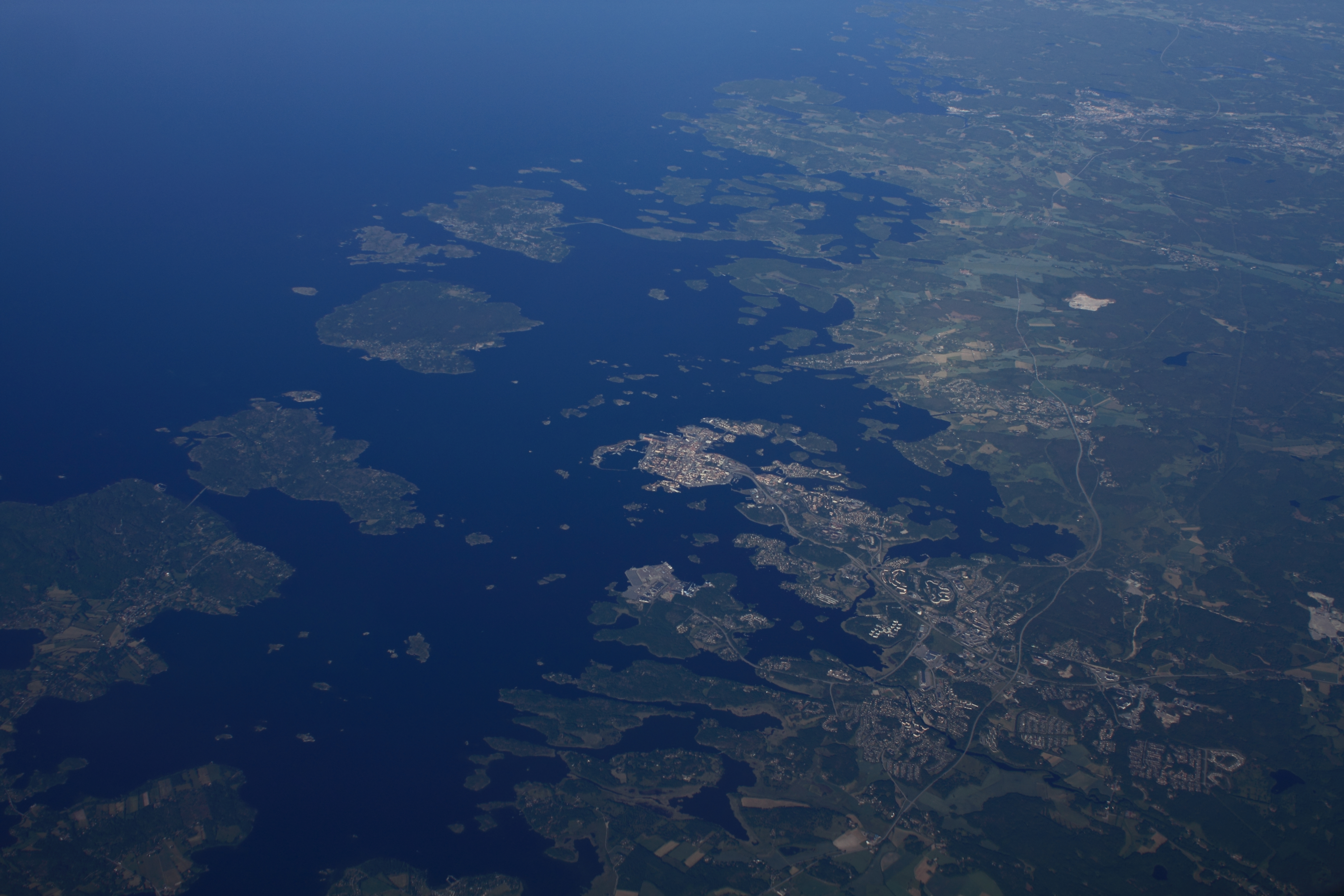
Aerial view of the eastern part of Blekinge archipelago with Karlskrona in the centre

Blekinge archipelago is an archipelago in the Baltic Sea, located in Blekinge in the south of Sweden.

== Geography ==
Blekinge archipelago stretches among almost the entire coastline of Blekinge, from west to east. It covers some 210,000 hectares (520,000 acres) including water; the landmass amounts to about 54,000 hectares (130,000 acres). The archipelago is dominated by a few large islands, Tjärö, Aspö, Hasslö, Tärnö and Sturkö, with smaller islands and skerries interspersed. In the whole archipelago area, some 85,000 people live, of whom 4,000 are islanders. The island of Utlängan is the furthest out to sea of the archipelago's islands. Only the lighthouse rock Utklippan is further out.

The landscape is a diverse cultural landscape, characterised by mainly a mix between oak pastures and deciduous forest. For its size, the archipelago exhibits an unusually high biodiversity. Endangered species that find a habitat in the archipelago include Osmoderma eremita and Lecanographa amylacea.

== Culture ==
The towns of Karlshamn and Karlskrona are both located within the archipelago area. Karlskrona is mainly situated on Trossö island. The latter, having been founded as a naval base, is noted for its Baroque architecture and listed as a UNESCO World Heritage Site.

Shipbuilding has been a local trade within the archipelago and the area is known for a traditional type of small boat, called blekingeeka and used for tasks like fishing and transporting stone locally.

In the 1970s, the local diving club discovered a shipwreck in the Blekinge archipelago that was eventually identified by archaeologists as Gribshunden, a 15th-century Danish warship. The shipwreck is significant as one of the best-preserved wreckages from the early modern period.

Tjärö island was the site of the Sweden Social Web Camp from 2009 to 2013.

== Gallery ==
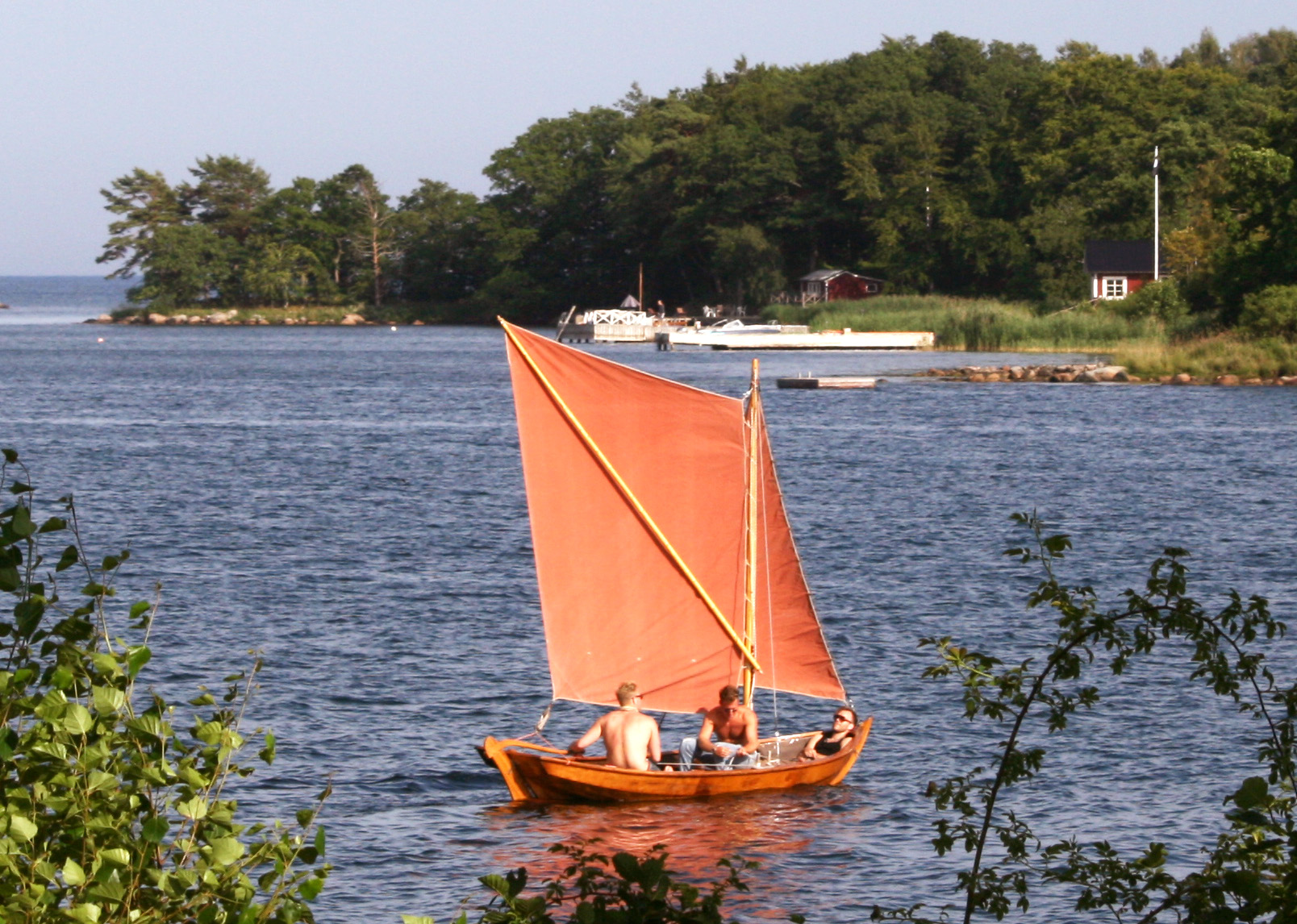
Blekingeeka, a type of small boat traditionally used in the archipelago area.

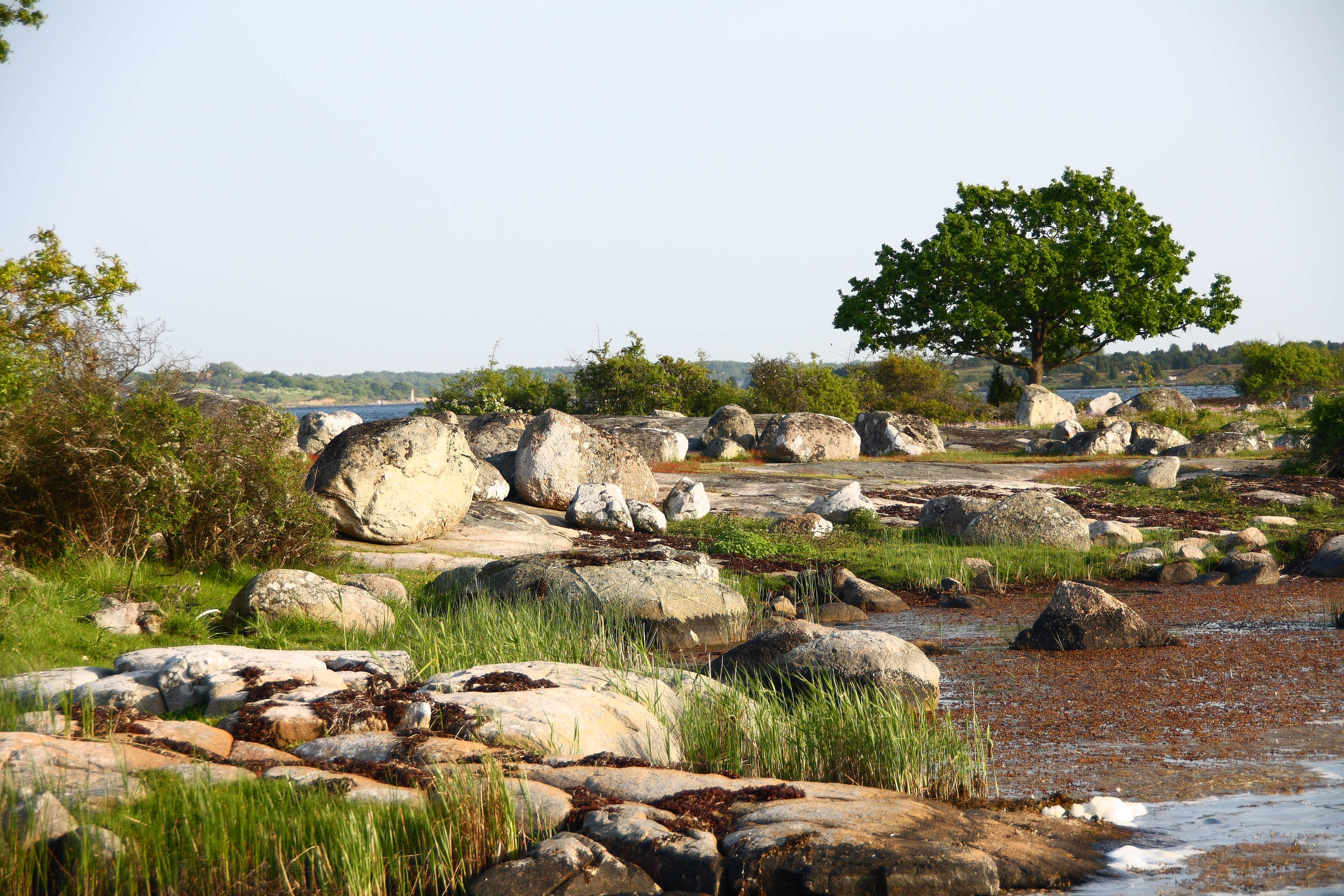
Typical landscape (Almö island)

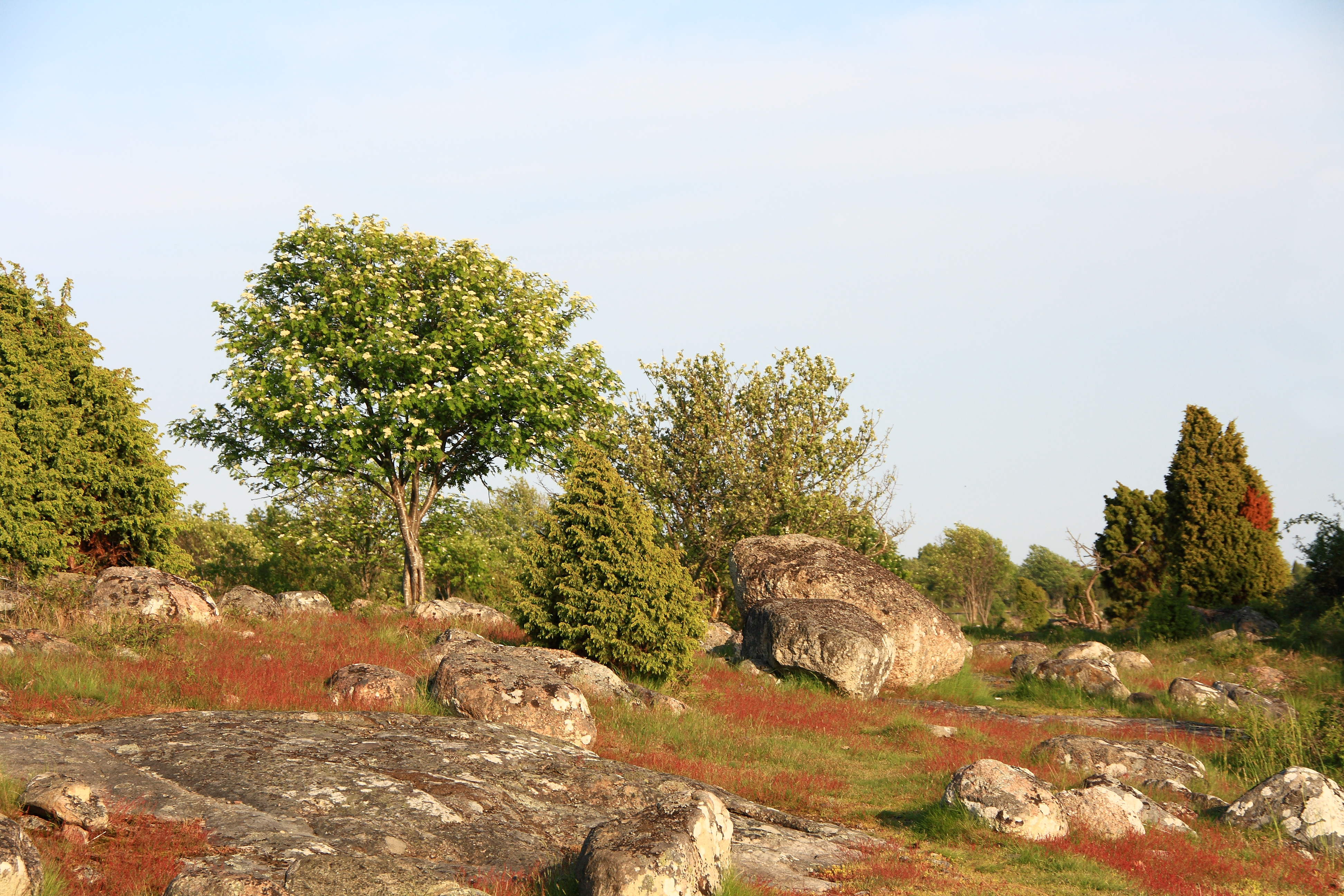
Typical landscape (Almö island)

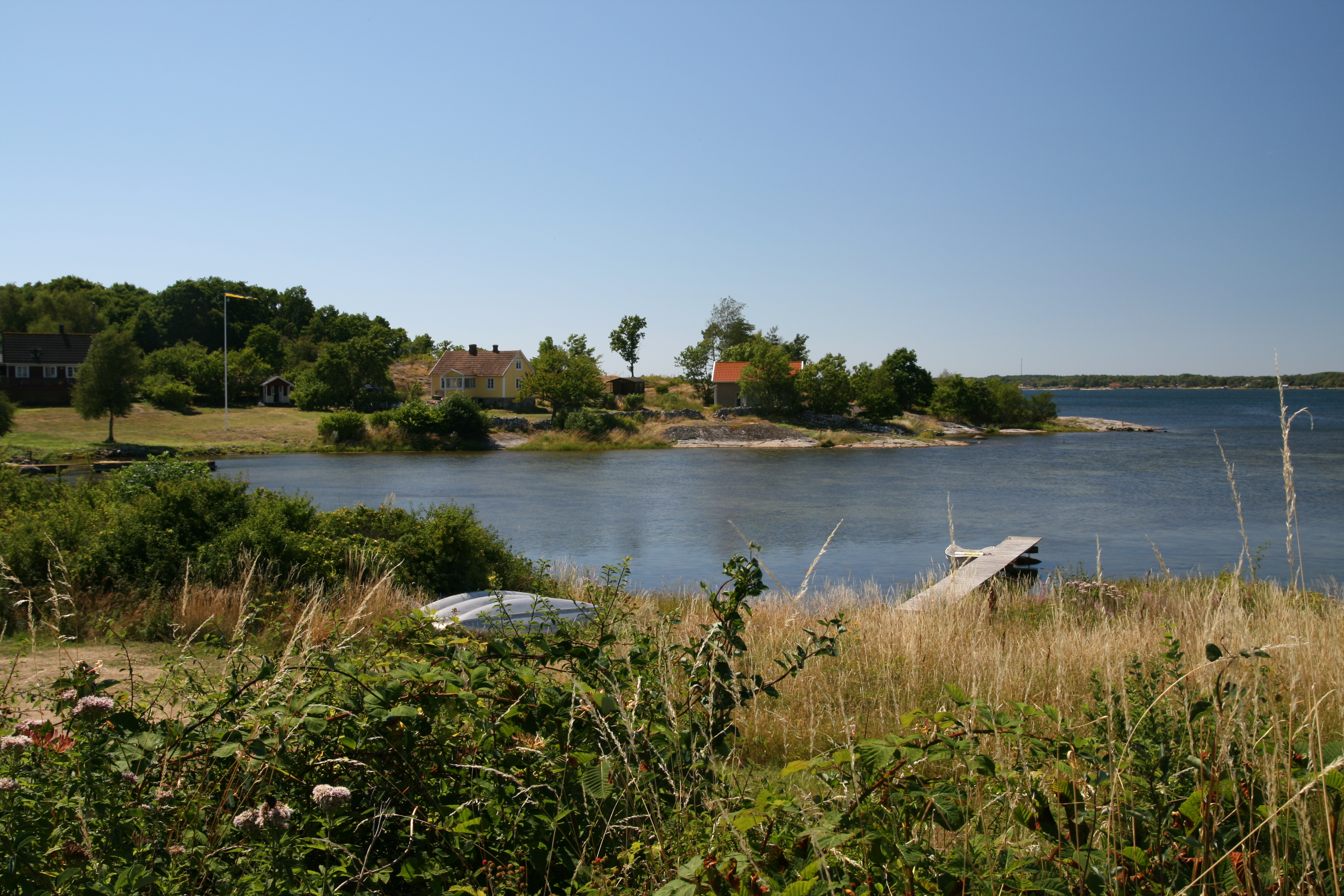
Typical landscape Aspö island

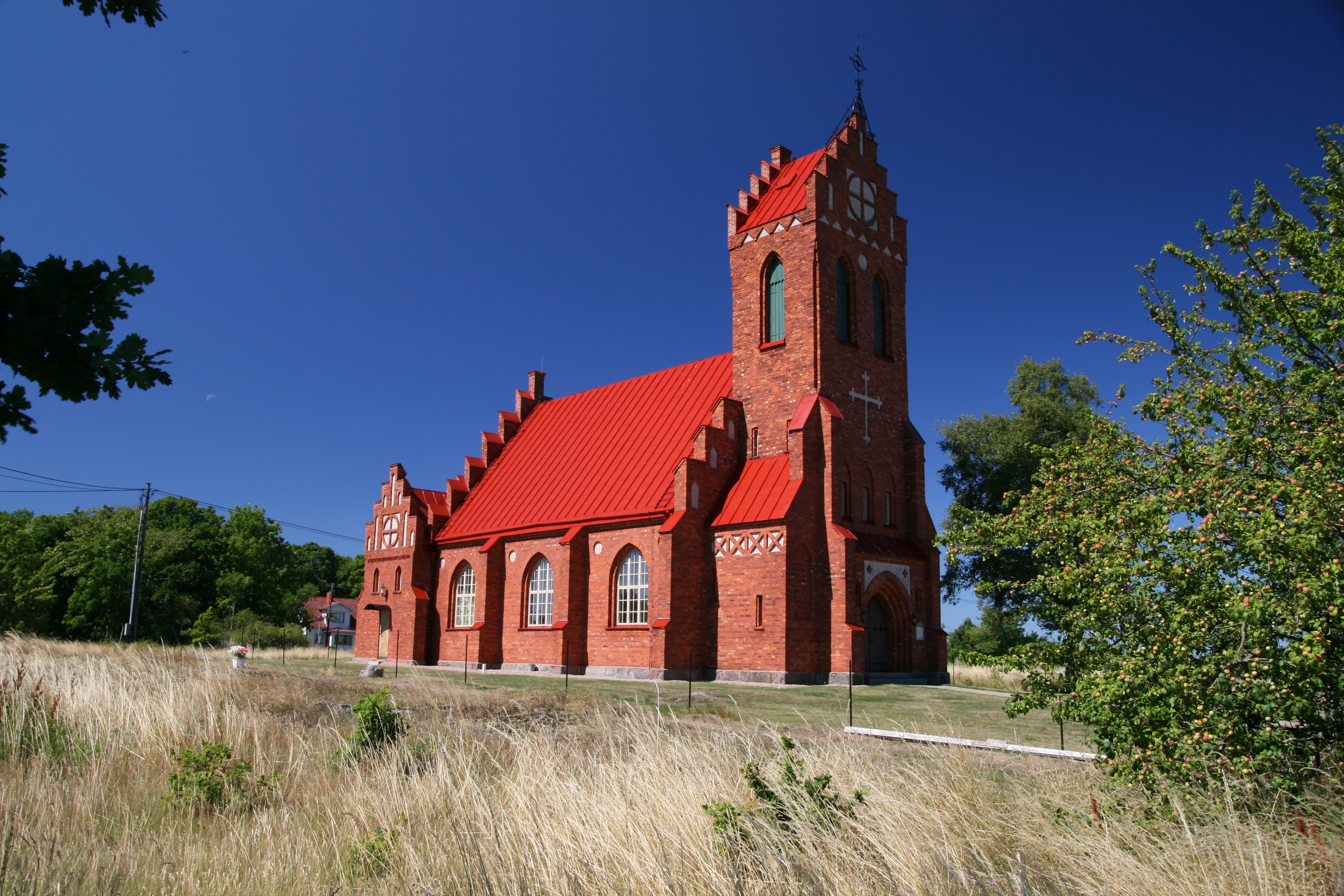
Church on Aspö island
