= Roxtec =

Swedish manufacturing company

Roxtec International AB
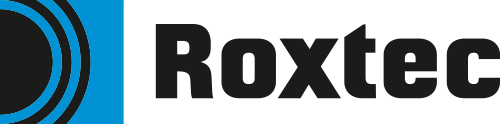

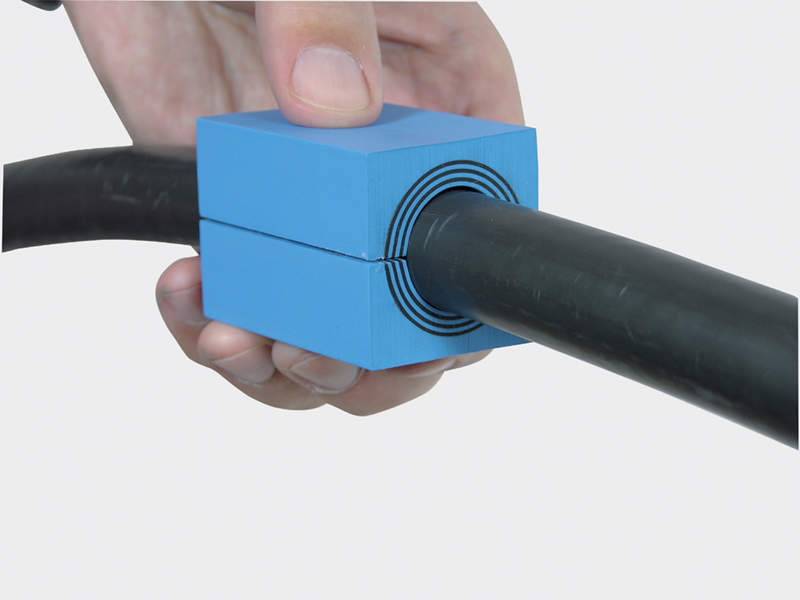
- A Roxtec sealing module
- Type: Private
- Founded: 1990
- Founder: Mikael Blomqvist
- Headquarters: Karlskrona, Sweden
- Owner: Mellby Gård Holding AB
- Website: Roxtec.com

Roxtec is a company specialising in the development and manufacture of cable and pipe seals (sometimes known as multi cable transits). Roxtec's products are designed to seal cable and pipe penetrations in order to protect from multiple hazards including fire, water, gas, dust, vibrations, electro-magnetic disturbances, vermin, and the risk of explosion. Markets include power, marine, oil and gas, telecoms, infrastructure, industrial equipment, and the process industries.

Roxtec is based in Sweden with subsidiaries and distributors. It is owned by Mellby Gård Industri and the CEO is Magnus Holmberg. Roxtec International AB is certified in accordance with the ISO 9001 and ISO 14001 standards. It was founded in Sweden in 1990 after the invention of Multidiameter, a technology using module layers that are removable for adaptability to cables and pipes of different sizes.

== Oil and gas ==
Roxtec works in the oil and gas sectors internationally. It is accredited by FPAL to work in the UK North Sea, and has subscribed to the UKCS Oil and Gas industry Supply Chain Code of Practice which is administered by the Department for Energy and Climate Change (DECC).

Its UK work includes a project refurbishing a gas testing laboratory for Total S.A. at its St Fergus Gas Terminal near Aberdeen. Roxtec supplied Valaris Limited, a global offshore drilling specialist with multi-cable transit seals used to upgrade offshore drilling rigs in the North Sea and protect against jet fire, flooding and explosion.

It has worked to supply Australia's biggest gas project, the Chevron operated Gorgon Project, on Barrow Island, Western Australia delivering cable penetration seals with built in electromagnetic compatibility (EMC) to protect the plant's electrical systems.

Roxtec was contracted by Agip, to supply products to one of the world's largest oil fields - the Kashagan project off the coast of Kazakhstan and has supplied semi-submersible drilling rigs being built for the offshore specialist SeaDragon.

== Power ==
Roxtec's work in the power transmission sector covers nuclear, renewable energy, clean fuels and transmission and distribution.

Renewable energy

Roxtec has worked on more than 40 offshore windfarms in Europe. Roxtec seals are utilised in a number of areas including cables in the generator system, the switch room, the converter, the tower, the nacelle, the transition pieces, the control cabinets, power converter cabinets, davit cranes, onshore grid substations and offshore converter stations.

Roxtec worked with Siemens Transmission and Distribution Ltd, which supplied and installed the two offshore substations for the first 630MW phase of London Array and it supplied cable sealing products on the Greater Gabbard wind farm off the Suffolk coast.

Nuclear

Roxtec seals are used to seal cables and utility systems in new and decommissioned nuclear power generation plants, research facilities and military establishments.

Transmission and distribution

Roxtec's work in the power transmission and distribution sector involves substations and Interconnector projects. Roxtec is used to seal power cables in the cable trench. Roxtec seals and protects the substation against water ingress. Flooded cable trenches were identified in a white paper by EA Technology as a major cause of substation failure.

Roxtec supplied Western Power Distribution, the electricity distribution network operator for the Midlands, South Wales and the South West, supplying over 7.7 million customers.

== Marine ==
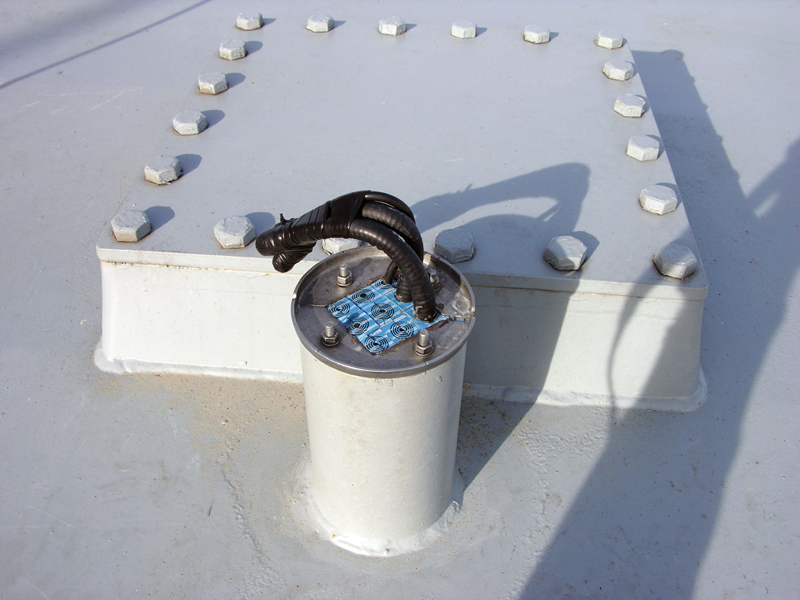
Roxtec R Frame Sealing a Deck Penetration

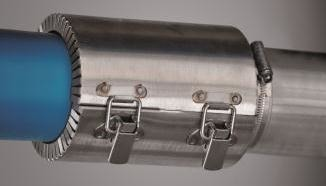
Roxtec Sleev-It Steel to Plastic Transition Collar

Roxtec's maritime work covers commercial, naval, passenger vessels and super yachts. Its products are used for cable penetrations and to seal both metal and plastic pipes. It is a member of the Society of Maritime Industries.

Ship build and ship repair

Roxtec products are used for new build, ship conversion plus repair and upgrade projects to seal cables and pipes through decks and bulkheads. The products are tested and approved for use in A class and H class-rated sections according to IMO Resolution A.754 (18) and SOLAS. They are also certified by various classification societies such as Lloyd's, ABS, Bureau Veritas and DNV GL.

Roxtec has worked on Wind Turbine installation vessels such as the TIV MPI Adventure and TIV MPI Discovery.

Royal Navy

Roxtec was used in a refit of the Royal Navy Type 23 Frigate HMS Lancaster sealing data and power cables. The transits have been used on other vessels in the fleet including Type 42 Destroyers HMS York and HMS Edinburgh. The cables have to be sealed according to the latest Defence Standard 02-510 (Def Stan). The Roxtec sealing system is approved to military standards in many countries and is NATO codified.

== Infrastructure ==
Roxtec's work in infrastructure includes bridges, tunnels, airports and metro systems, water treatment centres and high tech buildings. It operates in specialised industrial construction for pharmaceutical facilities, hospitals, micro electric plants, food and beverage production areas, plus laboratories, clean rooms and contamination controlled environments.

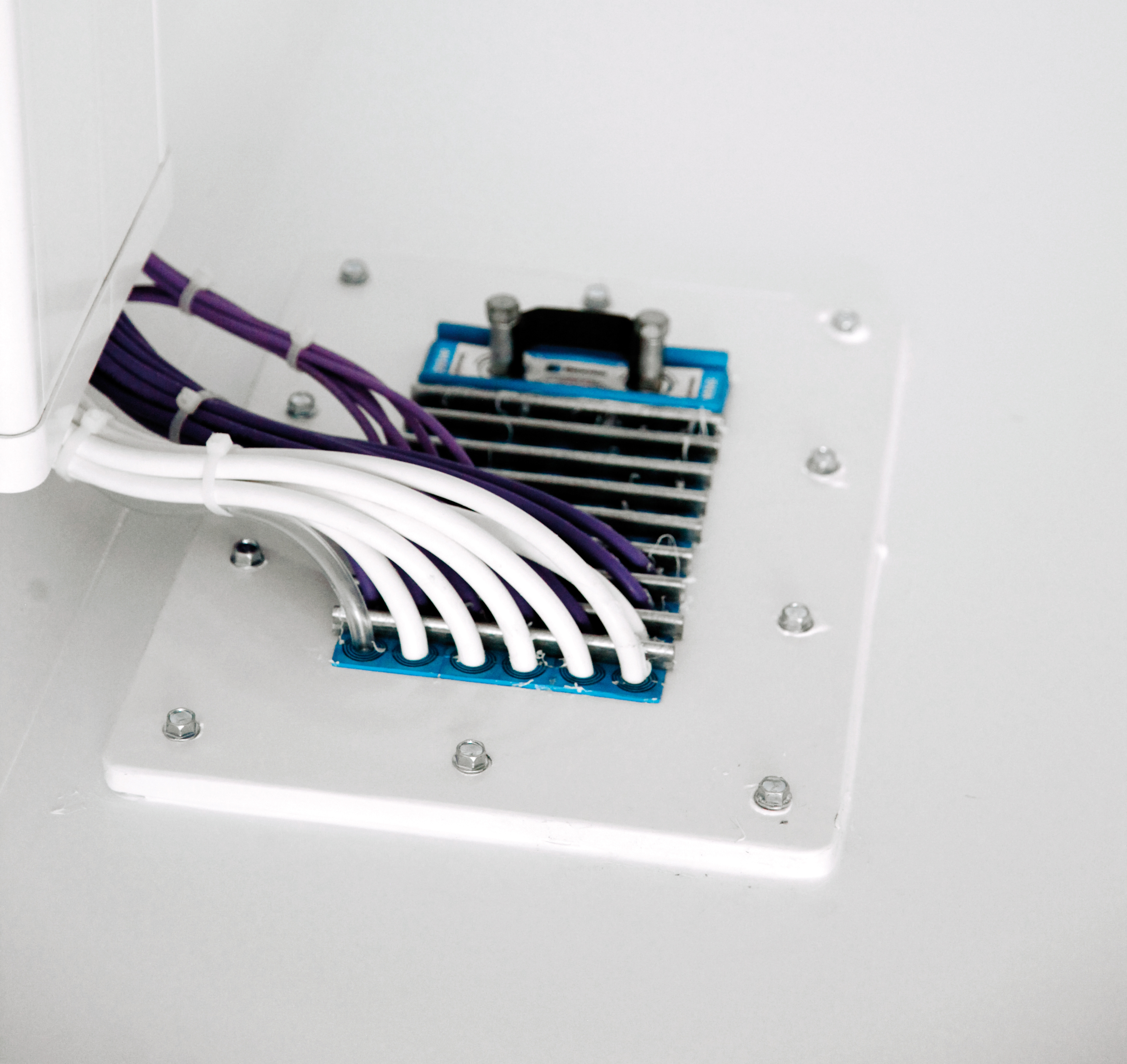
Power & Lighting Cables sealed with a Roxtec SFH Cleanroom Frame

Clean and contained rooms

Roxtec's range of airtight cable and pipe seals are designed for use in the laboratory sector. Clean and contained rooms are highly sensitive sterile environments often found in hospitals, medical facilities and laboratories. Roxtec cable and pipe seals are approved for use in CL3 and CL4 contained rooms and are capable of maintaining a gas tight seal in both negative and positive pressure environments.

The seals are specially designed to reduce the number of cable and pipe entries and maintain airtight integrity.

Royal Victoria Hospital

Roxtec seals were used in eight isolation rooms at the Royal Victoria Hospital, Belfast. and on the £200m medical research council molecular biology laboratory in Cambridge. Their products were used to seal all cables, pipes and ducts entering the laboratories.

== Telecom ==
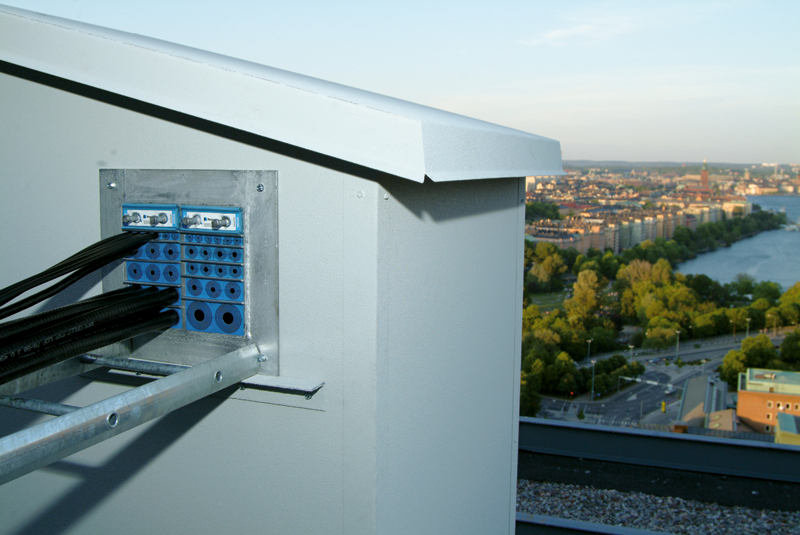
Roxtec cable entry system in a telecom shelter

Roxtec seals are used at cable entry points for telecoms cables, including waveguides, in network shelters, cabinets, switch stations, communication centres, radio links, rooftop sites and 3G and 4G base station shelters.

Roxtec has been used to seal telecoms cables in a number of data rooms and is commonly used as a cable seal for modular datacentres.

== Industrial equipment ==
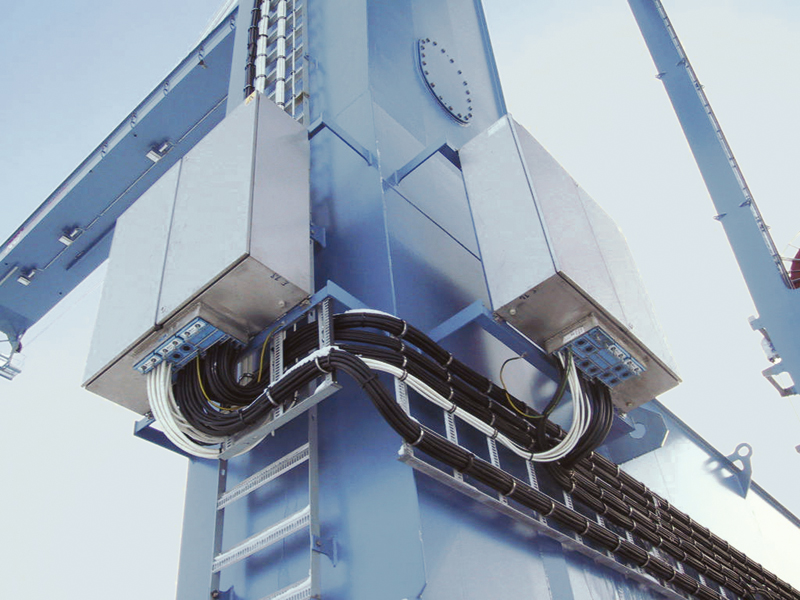
Roxtec cabinet seal installed on an offshore crane.

Roxtec's work in the Original Equipment Manufacturing sector covers cabinets, generators and turbines, robotics, rolling stock, trackside equipment and vehicles. Roxtec seals are used to protect electrical communications and power links on Bombardier Electrostar trains, safeguarding more than 200 train carriages on London's rail network. For this application, Bombardier required a lightweight, compact and fire-resistant seal.

In 2017 the Roxtec sealing system was approved for use on London Underground.

== Process industry ==
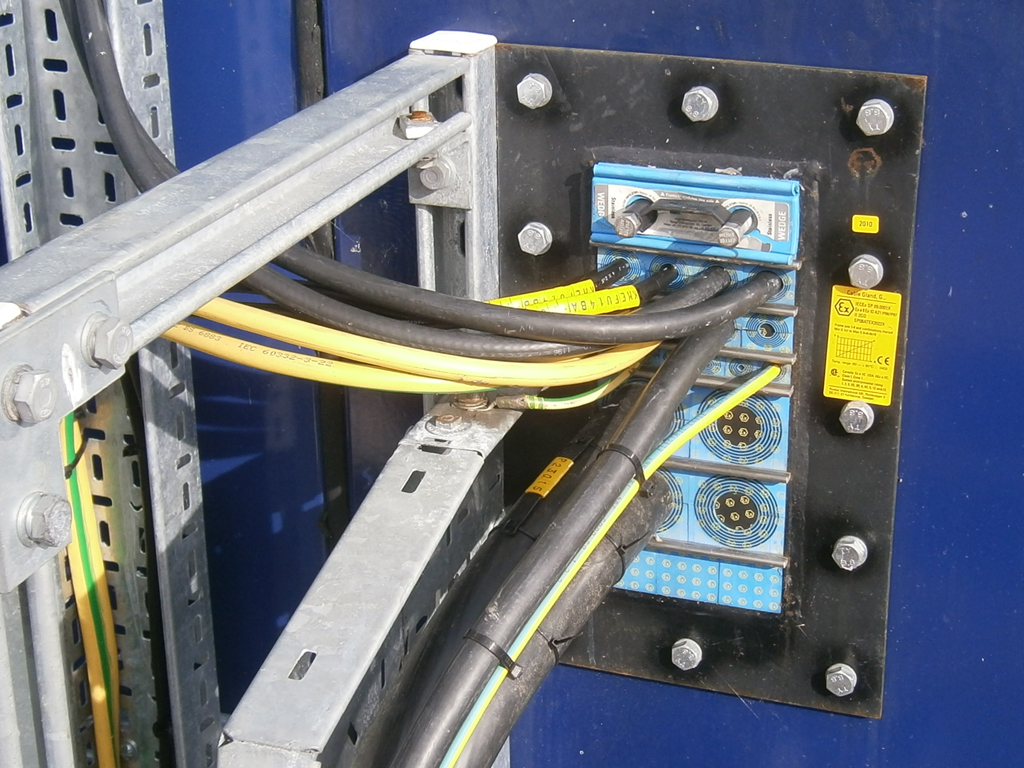
ATEX Ex approved Roxtec seals

In process facilities, Roxtec seals are used for sealing around cables and pipes that enter buildings, control cabinets and through bund walls. They are often used to replace cable glands on terminal and junction boxes.

Roxtec supplied blast proof cable and pipe seals for the Sadara Chemical Company's petrochemical plant.

Roxtec supplied fire proof cable seals for one of the UK's largest chemical manufacturing plants, BASF, bio-acrylamide chemical plant in Bradford. The frame was bolted into concrete, and standard Roxtec products were modified to seal power and earth cables entering the cable pit and motor control centre (MCC). The BASF system was designed to deliver passive fire and ingress protection with a 60-minute fire integrity ring.

== Trade associations ==
Roxtec Limited is a member of several trade bodies in the UK. These include:

- The Energy Industry Council (the EIC), a trade association for UK companies in the energy sector.
- Achilles Oil & Gas Europe, supplier management community supporting the European oil & gas industry.
- The Supply Chain Code of Practice, Roxtec Ltd is a signatory of this Code of Practice which outlines a set of best practice guidelines for the UKCS oil and gas industry.
- The Rail Industry Association (RIA), the trade association for the UK-based suppliers to the railway industry.
- The Society of Maritime Industries (SMI), the association for the UK's maritime engineering and business sector promoting and supporting companies.
- Sustainable Ports Association, a business development supply chain connecting businesses in the global sustainable ports sector. sustainable ports

== Awards ==
In 2020, Roxtec Ltd won the Diversification award at the Energy Industries Council's (EIC) Virtual Award Ceremony. The award celebrates Roxtec's ability to strategically diversify across several market sectors.

In 2019, Roxtec International received the 2019 Sweden's Best Managed Companies recognition, sponsored by Deloitte in cooperation with Nasdaq. The quality award recognizes the overall success of private Swedish companies based on strategic direction, ability to execute, corporate culture and financial performance.

Roxtec's work on UK wind farms resulted in the company winning an Environmental Protection award at HazardEx 2011. The award for environmental contribution to industry goes to a company which has used energy efficient processes or products within potentially explosive atmospheres and demonstrated experience in the renewable energy sector.

In 2009, Roxtec was included in the list of 'Super companies' produced by the Swedish business magazine Veckans Affärer ('Business Affairs' in English), and in the list of 'Gazelle companies' compiled by Dagens Industri. The company won the Swedish Trade Council's Grand Export Prize 2010.
