= Kentish Knock (disambiguation) =

Kentish Knock is a shoal off of Kent and Essex in England. It may also refer to:

- Battle of the Kentish Knock, fought in October 1652
- London Array, a wind farm near the Kentish Knock.
- Lightvessels in the United Kingdom, LV Kentish Knock was a lightship
