= Thanet Wind Farm =

Wind farm off the coast of Kent, England

Thanet Offshore Wind Farm
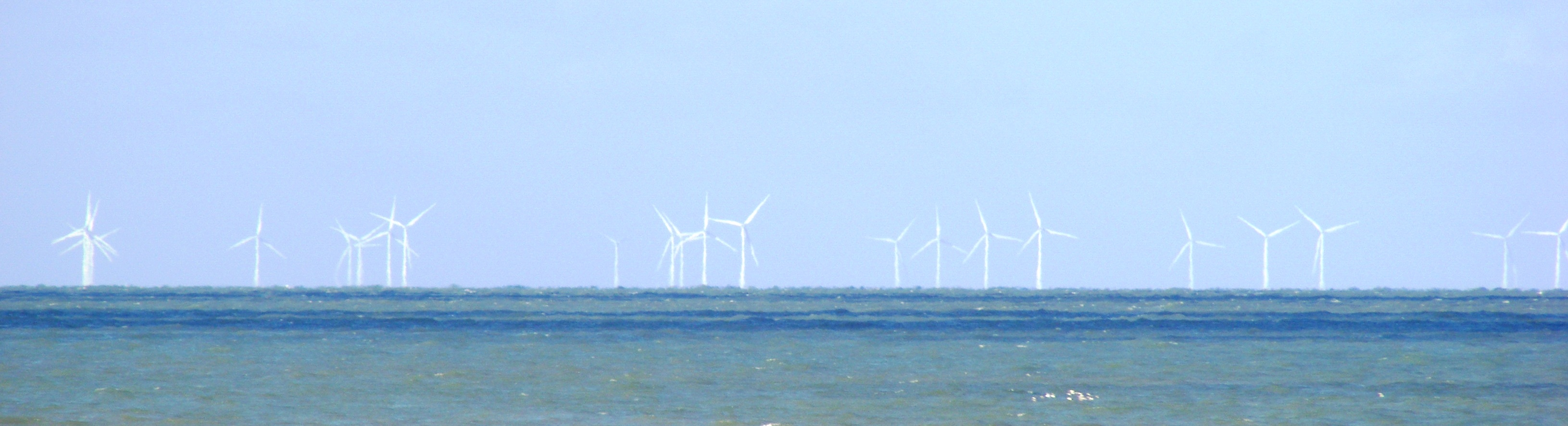
- Country: United Kingdom
- Location: Offshore of Thanet district, Kent
- Coordinates: 51°25′50″N 1°37′59″E
- Status: Operational
- Commission date: 23 September 2010
- Owner: Vattenfall
- Operator: Vattenfall

Wind farm
- Type: Offshore
- Max. water depth: 14–23 m (46–75 ft)
- Distance from shore: 12 km (7.5 mi)
- Rotor diameter: 90 m (300 ft)
- Rated wind speed: 15 m/s (49 ft/s)

Power generation
- Units operational: 100 × 3 MW
- Make and model: Vestas V90/3000 (100)
- Nameplate capacity: 300 MW
- Capacity factor: 31.3%
- Annual net output: 821.68 GW·h (2012)

External links
- Website: powerplants.vattenfall.com/thanet/
- Commons: Related media on Commons

Wind farm layout

The Thanet Wind Farm (also sometimes called Thanet Offshore Wind Farm) is an offshore wind farm 7 miles (11 km) off the coast of Thanet district in Kent, England. On commissioning it was the world's largest offshore wind farm. It has a nameplate capacity (maximum output) of 300 MW and it cost £780–900 million (US$1.2–1.4 billion). Thanet is one of fifteen Round 2 wind projects announced by the Crown Estate in January 2004 but the first to be developed. It was officially opened on 23 September 2010, when it overtook Horns Rev 2 as the biggest offshore wind farm in the world. It has since been overtaken by many others (medio 2017 it ranks 14th).

== Description ==
The project covers an area of 13.5 square miles (35 km^{2}), with 500 metres (1,600 ft) between turbines and 800 metres (2,600 ft) between the rows. Average water depth is 14–23 metres (46–75 ft). Planning permission for the project was granted on 18 December 2006. According to Thanet Offshore Wind Ltd, it was expected to be "the largest operational offshore wind farm in the World". The Thanet project has a total capacity of 300 MW which, by yearly average, is sufficient to supply approximately 240,000 homes. It has an estimated generation of 960 GW·h per year of electricity, i.e. a projected capacity factor of 36.5% and an average power density of 3.1 W/m^{2}.
In 2012, the yearly production achieved was 821.68 GW·h, i.e. a capacity factor of 31.3%.

Two submarine power cables (by Italy-based Prysmian Group) run from an offshore substation within the wind farm connecting to an existing onshore substation in Richborough, Kent, connecting to a world-first two transformers. The offshore substation steps up the turbine voltage of 33 kV to 132 kV for the grid. Maintenance of the turbines is carried out by Vestas, while a separate maintenance agreement with SLP Energy covers the turbines foundations. Turbines are installed by the Danish offshore wind farm services provider A2SEA. The TIV MPI Resolution carried and installed the turbines.

== Financial structure ==
The Thanet scheme is project financed. Thanet Offshore Wind Ltd (TOW), the project company was owned by hedge fund Christofferson, Robb & Co. It was purchased from a group of sponsors led by Warwick Energy Ltd. In August 2008 Christofferson, Robb & Co placed the project back on the market. On 10 November 2008, Vattenfall, a Swedish energy company, acquired TOW.

== Development ==
The development was due to be in place by 2008. Vestas were chosen as the preferred turbine supplier in July 2006, and SLP were chosen as the preferred supplier for the foundations in September 2006. The project was delayed by a number of issues including problems with Vestas who temporarily withdrew their V90 offshore model from the market in 2007 following gearbox problems. The V90-3MW was re-released for sales starting from May 2008.

Vattenfall acquired the project in November 2008. On 28 June 2010, they reported that all turbines had been installed for commissioning due by the end of 2010. The wind farm was completed in September 2010.

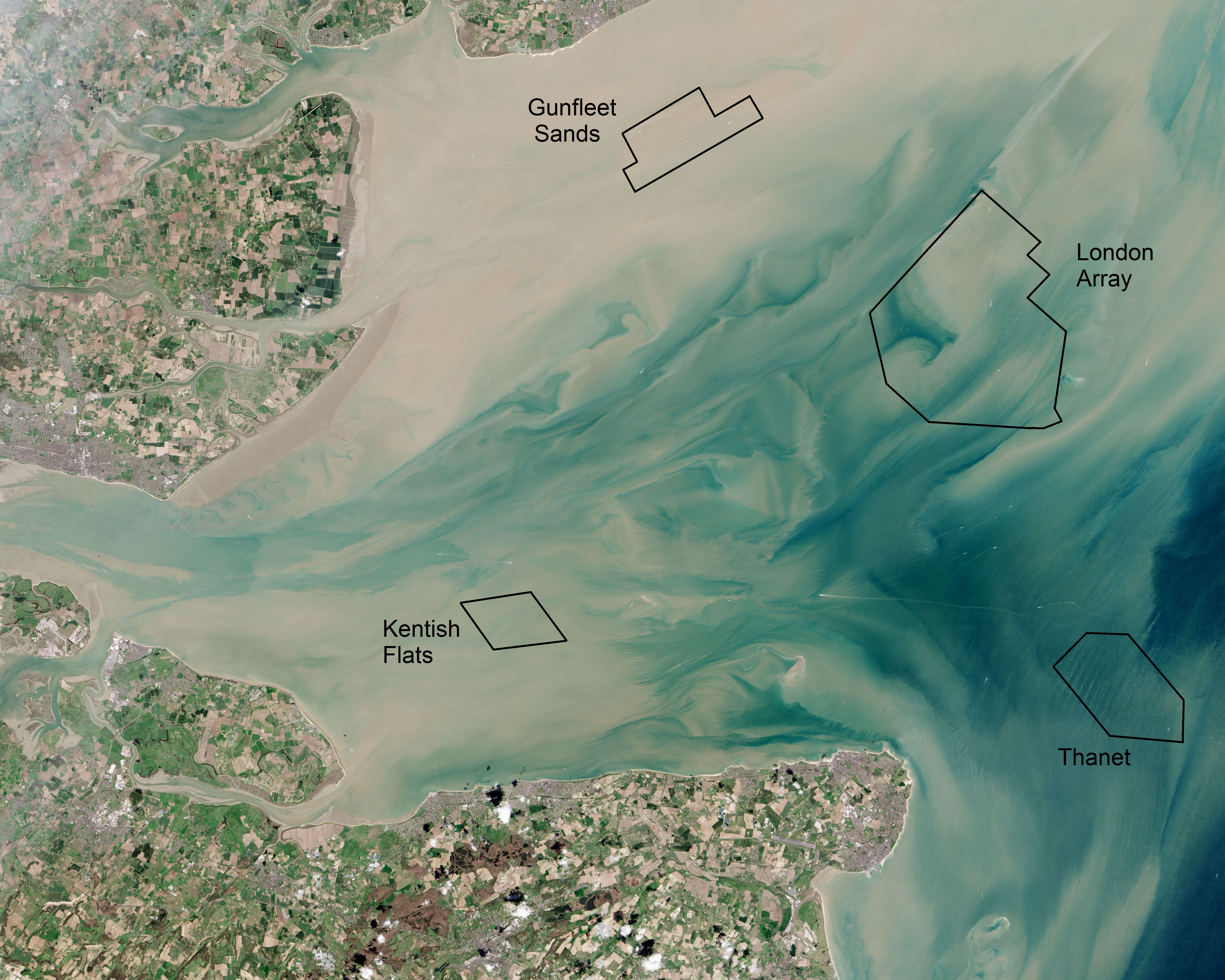
Satellite image of the Thames Estuary with Thanet Wind Farm bottom right.

== Criticism ==
Since turbine construction makes up the majority of the project cost and the UK has no capacity, much of the work was contracted to foreign companies, resulting in only 20% of the investment going to British firms. There have been calls for the creation of a domestic wind industry.

An article by climate change denier and intelligent design supporter Christopher Booker criticised the subsidy given to develop the project and drew attention to the capacity factor of wind farms. As of December 2017, Thanet's lifetime capacity factor has been 32.6%. Its levelised cost has been estimated at £159/MWh.

== Extension ==
In June 2010, the Crown Estate announced that Thanet wind farm could be extended to produce an additional 147 MW. However, in October 2010, Vattenfall stated that it would not proceed. As of 2017 Vattenfall is working at the option for an extension

On 2 June 2020, the DCO for a new cluster of wind turbines off the coast of Thanet was rejected. Business secretary Alok Sharma said the proposal by Vattenfall would not be allowed to proceed. The proposals would have seen 34 turbines sited 8 km from the shore, which would reportedly generate more power than the existing 100 turbines, which sit 12 km off Foreness Point. Vattenfall stated in their initial application that the Thanet Extension would allow an expansion to the existing workforce of 75 people. Danielle Lane, UK country manager for the Scandinavian organisation, said: "Naturally we’re very disappointed by this decision and will consider how we proceed from here. "We continue to believe that Thanet extension would be an important development for the local area, for UK energy security, and for the drive to reduce emissions." The extension would have had a capacity of up to 340MW and would be capable of supplying renewable electricity annually to the equivalent of about 282,000 UK homes

== See also ==
- London Array
- Wind power in the United Kingdom
- List of offshore wind farms
- List of offshore wind farms in the United Kingdom
- List of offshore wind farms in the North Sea
