= Black Deep =

Largest shipping channel in the Thames Estuary

Coordinates: 51°45.8′N 1°31.7′E

The Black Deep is in the outer Thames Estuary. It is the greatest of three mainly natural shipping channels linking the Tideway to central zones of the North Sea without shoals, the others being the Barrow Deep and Princes Channel. Between these, a few others, and the shores of Kent, Suffolk and Essex are many long shoals in the North Sea, broadly shallow enough to wreck vessels of substantial draft at low tide.

Its open sea end is distant from but due east of Foulness Point and due south of Clacton-on-Sea (both in Essex) and is bounded by two large typical sandbank form of shoals, the Knock John and Sunk Sands to the north-west, and the Girdler – and Long Sands, the largest of those away from the shore – spread out to the south and east.

== Nautical markers ==
Deep-draught vessels making for the Port of London from the North Sea use it to approach from the north-east from the position of the Sunk lightship, thence into the narrow Knock John channel, to enter the Tideway (lower Thames).

Passing south of the West Knock buoy off Shoeburyness, large bulk carriers also tend to use the channel when entering or exiting the Medway estuary as it has a minimum depth of 14 metres as far as Kingsnorth.

== History ==
Before reliable maps, navigation tools and warnings, such as buoys and lightvessels, the outer Thames Estuary was hard to navigate due to its many sandbanks. The whole zone is also known as the Thames Shoals. One of the earliest references to maritime pilotage dates from 1387 and refers to a pilot "of the Black Deeps" in the estuary.

Richard Caundish, sixteenth-century maker of the oldest known English maritime chart, who had charted the Thames shoals, was assisted by a pilot who had found a new, safer route through the Black Deep.

A dark rumour of London in that century, put to paper by the chroniclers John Rastell and Edward Hall, by a continuer of John Hardyng's chronicle and later by John Speed, had it that Richard III, aided by the priest of Sir Robert Brackenbury, had disposed of the bodies of the murdered Edward V of England and Richard of Shrewsbury, 1st Duke of York in the Black Deep, "whereby they should never rise up, or be any more seen".

As of strategic importance, access to the Deep has been restricted in wartime, while during the Second World War naval forts stood at Sunk Head and Knock John to deter German minelaying. Until 1967 the daily sludge from London's main Crossness and Beckton Sewage Treatment Works was dumped in the Black Deep 60 miles (97 km) away from London Bridge for three decades after Barrow Deep was used, after which it, better chemically treated, became legal to use as field fertiliser. From the same time a programme of dredging by the Port of London Authority increased the depth of Knock John channel to open the Knock John – Black Deep route to large tankers.

Through much of the 1980s, Knock John Deep was the anchorage spot for Radio Caroline's Ross Revenge ship.

== Scope and soundings ==
Excerpt of a chart of 1934. Here, the more shallow (dangerous) the darker-shaded. Click for broader map and to enable varied magnification.

To explain the numbers on the inset map a depth of 1_{1} is a formula of six feet (i.e. one fathom) and 1 foot. It is 1 1/6 fathoms. Some of Long Sands is less than this. Black Deep extends many more miles to the north-east. This excerpt shows clearly the detailed shallows which affect vessels of greater draught such as ships most severely. The southern connector to the Princes/Queens Channel, the South Edinburgh Channel is among the small deep channels that require good power and/or understanding of tides and position to navigate correctly – the South Edinburgh Channel Wreck was a wreck of a cargo vessel of about the 1810s.

== London Array ==
The London Array wind farm is immediately to the east of the Deep.

== See also ==
- Fisherman's Gat
