= Kentish Flats Offshore Wind Farm =

Wind farm in the North Sea

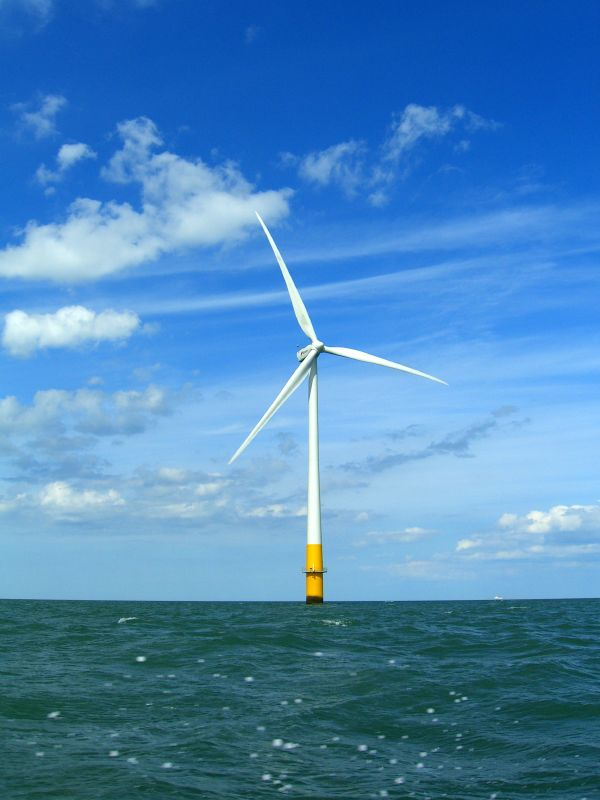
- Vestas V90 Wind Turbine Kentish Flats
- Country: England, United Kingdom
- Location: North Sea off the coast of Kent, South East England
- Coordinates: 51°27′36″N 1°5′24″E
- Status: Operational
- Construction began: August 2004
- Commission date: 2005
- Owner: Vattenfall

Wind farm
- Type: Offshore
- Max. water depth: 3–5 m (10–16 ft)
- Distance from shore: 5.5 mi (8.9 km)
- Hub height: 70 m (230 ft)
- Rotor diameter: 90 m (300 ft)
- Site area: 10 km^{2} (3.9 sq mi)

Power generation
- Units operational: 45
- Make and model: Vestas V90-3MW / V112-3.3MW
- Nameplate capacity: 139.5 MW
- Capacity factor: 30%

External links
- Commons: Related media on Commons

Wind farm layout

The Kentish Flats Offshore Wind Farm is a wind farm located off the coast of Kent, England on a large, flat and shallow plateau just outside the main Thames shipping lanes. The wind farm is operated by Vattenfall.

== Location ==
The distance from the nearest wind turbine to Whitstable is 6.2 miles (10.0 km). The nearest turbine is 5.5 miles (8.9 km) away from Herne Bay.

== Installation ==
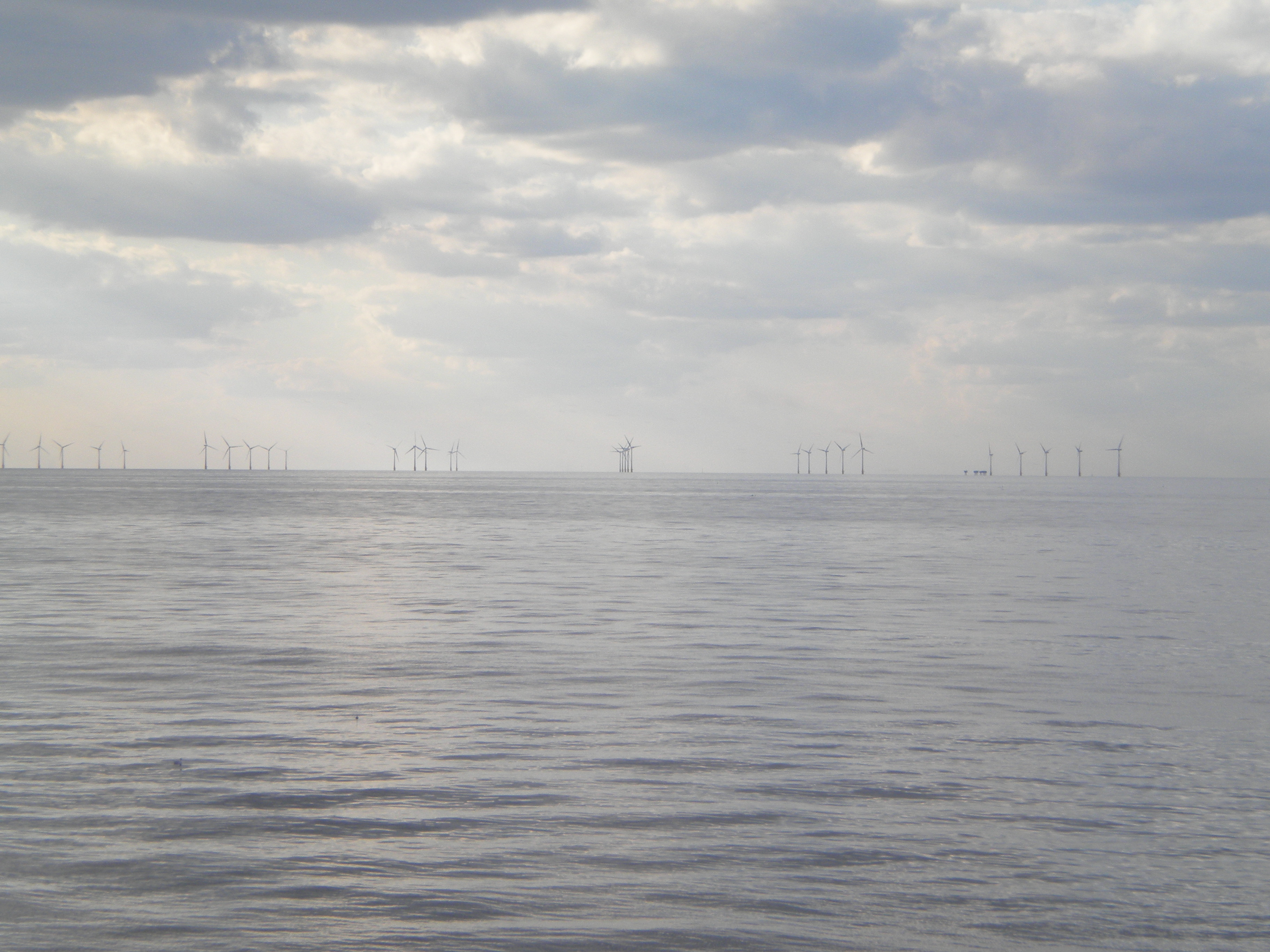
Turbines at Kentish Flats, Kent, England, with the WWII gun platforms visible towards the right.

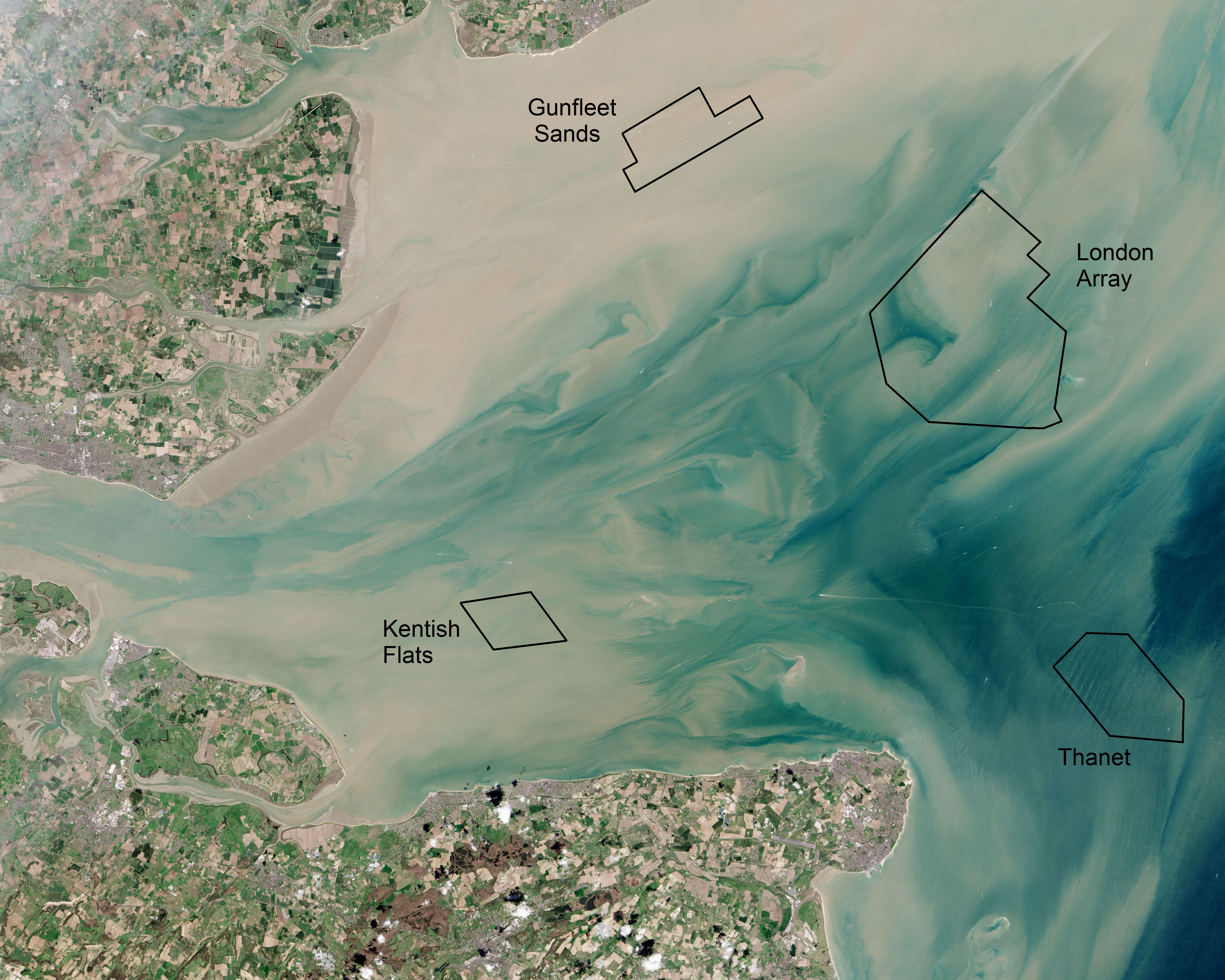
Satellite image of the Thames Estuary with Kentish Flats (pre-extension) bottom left.

Construction was completed in August 2005, with commissioning and testing of all turbines completed by September 2005. The wind farm consists of 30 Vestas V90-3MW wind turbines with a total nameplate capacity of 90 MW. Turbines were installed by the Danish offshore wind farms services provider A2SEA. Between 2007 and 2010, the capacity factor was around 30%. Its levelised cost has been estimated at £66/MWh.

Power is transmitted to shore via three export cables.

== Kentish Flats extension ==
In February 2013 Vattenfall was granted consent to extend the existing Kentish Flats Offshore Wind Farm. 15 turbines each with a capacity of 3.3 MW were installed adding an extra 49.5 MW to the wind farm. Offshore construction began in October 2014 and was operational by December 2015.

== See also ==
- Wind power in the United Kingdom
- List of offshore wind farms
- List of offshore wind farms in the United Kingdom
- List of offshore wind farms in the North Sea
