= South Edinburgh Channel Wreck =

Wreck in Thames Estuary, England

Coordinates: 51°31′46″N 1°14′47″E

The remains of an eighteenth- to nineteenth-century cargo vessel were discovered in the South Edinburgh Channel, Outer Thames Estuary, northwest of Margate, Kent, England, in 1976. The site was designated under the Protection of Wrecks Act on 29 April 1977. The wreck is a Protected Wreck managed by Historic England.

== The wreck ==
The site consists of the remains of a large wreck, probably Swedish, a cargo vessel dating from some time after its coinage of 1787. To bear such coinage only it may have been wrecked at latest about twenty years later. It was in good condition with surviving timbers, wine bottles, and Swedish copper plate money.

== Discovery and investigation ==
The site was discovered in 1976 when the Port of London Authority were dredging the South Edinburgh Channel. Further investigation was undertaken in 1977 which resulted in the recovering of the wine and coins.
