= A2SEA =

- Type: private
- Industry: Offshore construction and services
- Founded: 2000
- Headquarters: Fredericia, Denmark
- Key people: Michael Glavind (CEO)
- Services: transport, installation, and servicing of offshore wind farms
- Parent: DEME
- Website: www.a2sea.com

A2SEA was an offshore wind farm installation and services company based in Fredericia, Denmark. The company specializes in transport, installation, and servicing of offshore wind farms. In addition to Denmark, the company has subsidiaries in the United Kingdom and Germany. A2SEA was bought in 2017 by GeoSea which was then integrated in DEME Offshore in 2019.

== History ==
A2SEA was established in 2000. In 2001, M/S Ocean Ady (now: Sea Energy) and M/S Ocean Hanne (now: Sea Power) were converted into turbine installation vessels. The company's first installation work was the Horns Rev 1 wind farm in the North Sea in 2002. In following years the company installed among others the Frederikshavn, Nysted, Arklow Bank, Scroby Sands, Kentish Flats and Thanet, and got contracts for the installation works on London Array and Ormonde offshore wind farms.

In 2009, the company was acquired by the Danish energy company DONG Energy. In 2010, it was announced that Siemens Wind Power will acquire a 49% stake in the company at a price of DKK 860m. The deal needed an approval of regulatory authorities, which came on 13 October 2010.

In 2010, turnover was 586m DKK, while profit was 86m.

In 2017, A2SEA was sold to GeoSea, a Belgian offshore installation company member of the DEME Group.

In 2019, DEME decided to integrate all its offshore companies (GeoSea, Tideway and A2SEA) into DEME Offshore.

== Fleet ==
A2SEA has fleet of two semijacked vessels (Sea Energy and Sea Power) and two jack-ups (Sea Jack and Sea Worker), all of them specially converted for offshore wind turbines installation. In 2010, A2SEA ordered a new semijacked vessel Sea Installer which is the first specially designed wind generator installation vessel of its fleet.

In early 2016 the barge Sea Worker was grounded off Nymindegab, Denmark after its tow cable broke during bad weather. Approximately 1 week later the vessel capsized.
