= TIV MPI Resolution =

Wind turbine installation vessel

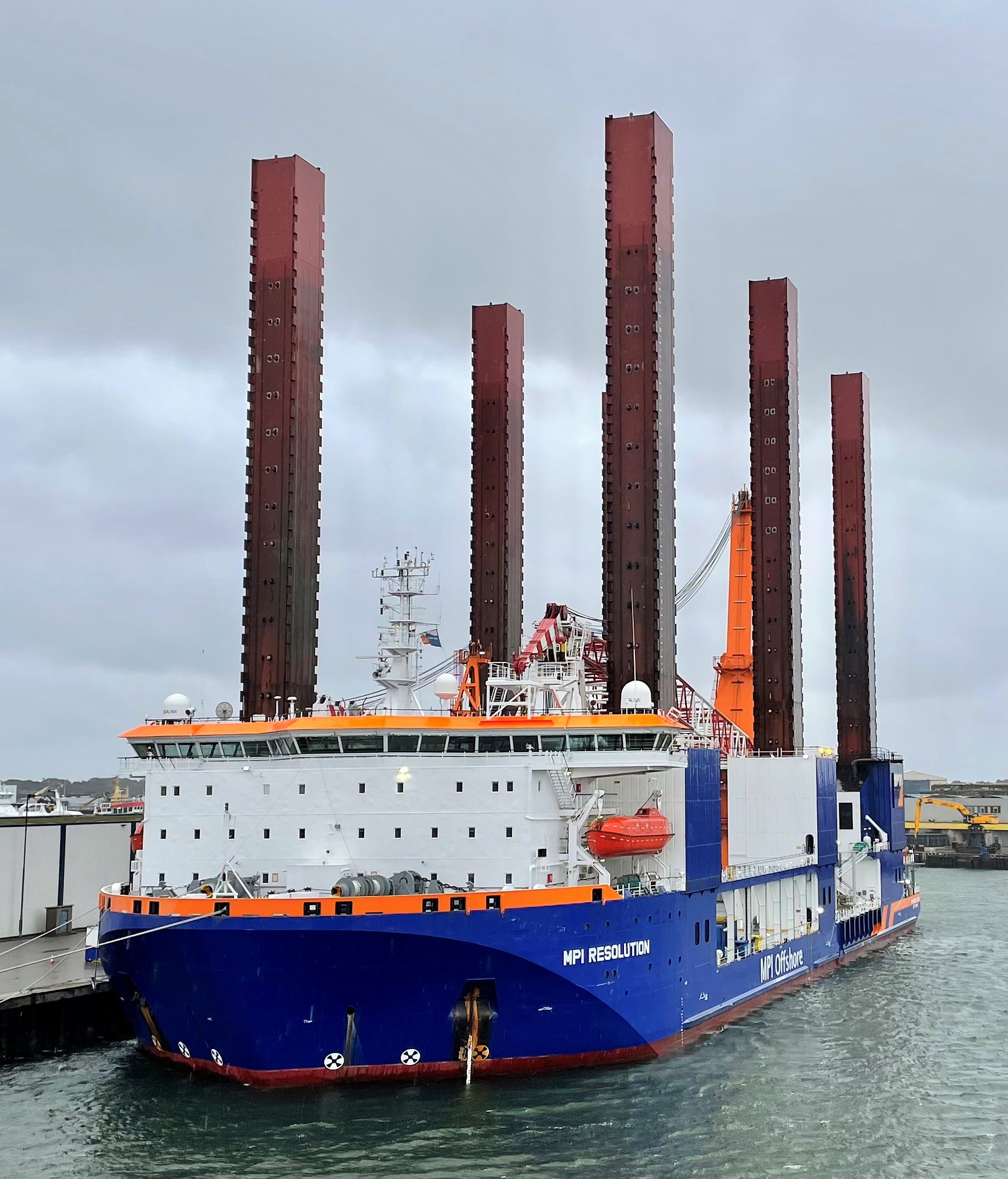

History

Netherlands
- Name: Mayflower Resolution (2003-04); Resolution (from 2004); TIV Resolution (to 2010); MPI Resolution (since 2010)
- Namesake: Mayflower
- Owner: Mayflower Energy Ltd (2003-04); MPI Offshore Ltd (from 2004)
- Port of registry: (Isle of Man) Douglas (2003-04); (Cyprus) Limassol (from 2004); (Netherlands) Rotterdam
- Ordered: 2002
- Builder: Shanhaiguan Shipyard, Qinhuangdao, China
- Cost: $93,000,000 (£53,000,000)
- Yard number: TIV 1
- Launched: 2003
- Completed: November 2003
- In service: February 2004
- Identification: IMO number: 9260134; MMSI number: 246777000; Callsign: PCJM
- Status: In service

General characteristics
- Class & type: Turbine Installation Vessel
- Tonnage: 14,857 GT
- Length: 130.5 m (428 ft 2 in) overall
- Beam: 38 m (124 ft 8 in)
- Height: 68.94 m (226 ft 2 in) at 2.89 m (9 ft 6 in) draught, 66.83 metres (219 ft 3 in) at 5 metres (16 ft 5 in) draught.
- Draught: 2.89 m (9 ft 6 in) to 5 m (16 ft 5 in)
- Propulsion: 4 × ABB AMA4xxLx diesel engines (1,900 kilowatts (2,500 hp) each) powering 4 x Aquamaster US 205/ 3850A Azimuth thrusters (1,500 kilowatts (2,000 hp) each).; 3 × ABB AMA400L6L diesel engines powering 3 x Kamewa TT1650 CP bow thrusters (700 kilowatts (940 hp) each).
- Speed: 10.5 knots (19.4 km/h)
- Capacity: 8,920 tonnes (8,780 long tons) maximum payload, 3,200 square metres (3,800 sq yd) maximum cargo area. 1 x 300 tonnes (300 long tons) crane, 1 x 50 tonnes (49 long tons) crane. 1 x Remote operating vessel.
- Complement: 34 crew, plus up to 36 installation personnel

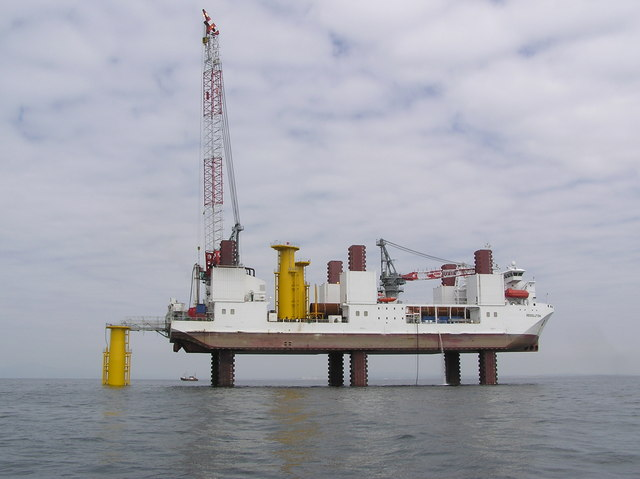
MPI Resolution installing the foundation of an offshore wind turbine.

MPI Resolution (formerly TIV Mayflower Resolution) is a wind turbine installation vessel deployed to install turbines at offshore wind farms. It was the first self-elevating Turbine Installation Vessel in the world. She can raise herself on her six legs between 3 metres (10 ft) and 46 metres (151 ft) above the sea.

== Description ==
MPI Resolution is a 14,857 GT vessel which has six legs that she can use to raise itself out of the sea when installing offshore wind turbines. Resolution is designed for use in the North Sea, although she can be deployed elsewhere if required. She has the capacity for ten wind turbines at a time. The whole ship can be jacked up out of the sea on her six legs, to provide a stable platform when installing wind turbines. The jacking system uses hydraulics. She can raise herself between 3 metres (10 ft) and 46 metres (151 ft) above the sea.

MPI Resolution is powered by four Mitsubishi S16R-MPTK2 diesel generators of 1,920 kilowatts (2,570 hp) each, and two Wartsila 6L20 diesel generators of 1110kW each, powering four Rolls-Royce Aquamaster US 205/3850 azimuth thrusters of 1,500 kilowatts (2,000 hp) and three Rolls-Royce Kamewa TT1650 CP bow thrusters of 700 kilowatts (940 hp).

On arrival at the site of the wind turbine, MPI Resolution lowers her six legs to stand on the seabed, and then jacks herself up above the surface of the sea. This provides a stable platform to hammer down a mono-pile into the sea bed and install the wind turbine. When the turbine has been installed, Resolution lowers herself and sails to the next position to repeat the process.

== History ==
Mayflower Resolution was ordered in 2002 by Mayflower Energy Ltd. She was built by Shanhaiguan shipyard, Qinhuangdao, China as yard number TIV 1. She was designed by Dane Knud E Hansen and construction was supervised by Graig Shipping. Mayflower Resolution was built for Mayflower Energy Ltd, part of Mayflower Corporation. Delivery was scheduled for February 2003, but was delayed and the £20,000,000 budget was exceeded by some £10,000,000. The addition of a remotely operated vehicle to lay submarine cables pushed to final bill for her construction to £53,000,000.

Mayflower Resolution was completed in November 2003, and delivered in February 2004. The journey from Qinhuangdao to Falmouth, Cornwall took 66 days. She underwent trials in Falmouth Bay, where she was tested for the first time. Mayflower Resolution was then put to work installing wind turbines at the North Hoyle windfarm for National Wind Power. The contract ended on 23 March and Mayflower Resolution sailed to Middlesbrough, arriving on 30 March. She was due to depart for Great Yarmouth on 8 April to work on installing turbines for the Scroby Sands wind farm. On 31 March, Mayflower Corporation went into administration with debts of £17,700,000. Deloitte Touche were appointed as administrators. Mayflower Resolution was sold by the administrators for £12,000,000 to a group of Mayflower Corporation's managers who managed to get backing from Japanese bank Mizuho International

The new owners became MPI Offshore, based in Stokesley, North Yorkshire. In 2006, MPI Resolution was used in the construction of the Barrow Offshore Wind project for Centrica and DONG Energy. In 2008, Resolution was used in the construction of the Lynn and Inner Dowsing Wind Farm for Centrica. It was announced in July 2008 that two more ships were to be built, based on MPI Resolution but slightly larger. They will be built by Cosco, at their Nantong shipyard. The two new ships will be named MPI Adventure and MPI Discovery. In February 2008, Resolution was sent to Esbjerg, Denmark to work on the installation of a wind farm. In January 2009, Resolution was used in the construction of the Robin Rigg Wind Farm. In 2010, Resolution was employed in the construction of the 100-turbine Thanet wind farm, off the coast of Kent, United Kingdom, sometimes carrying and installing 9 complete turbines.

Resolution also featured in the documentary Mighty Ships, season 2.

== Identification ==
MPI Resolution has the IMO Number 9260134 and callsign PCJM.

== See also ==
- Crane vessel
- List of offshore wind farms
