= Sea Installer =

Ship built in 2012

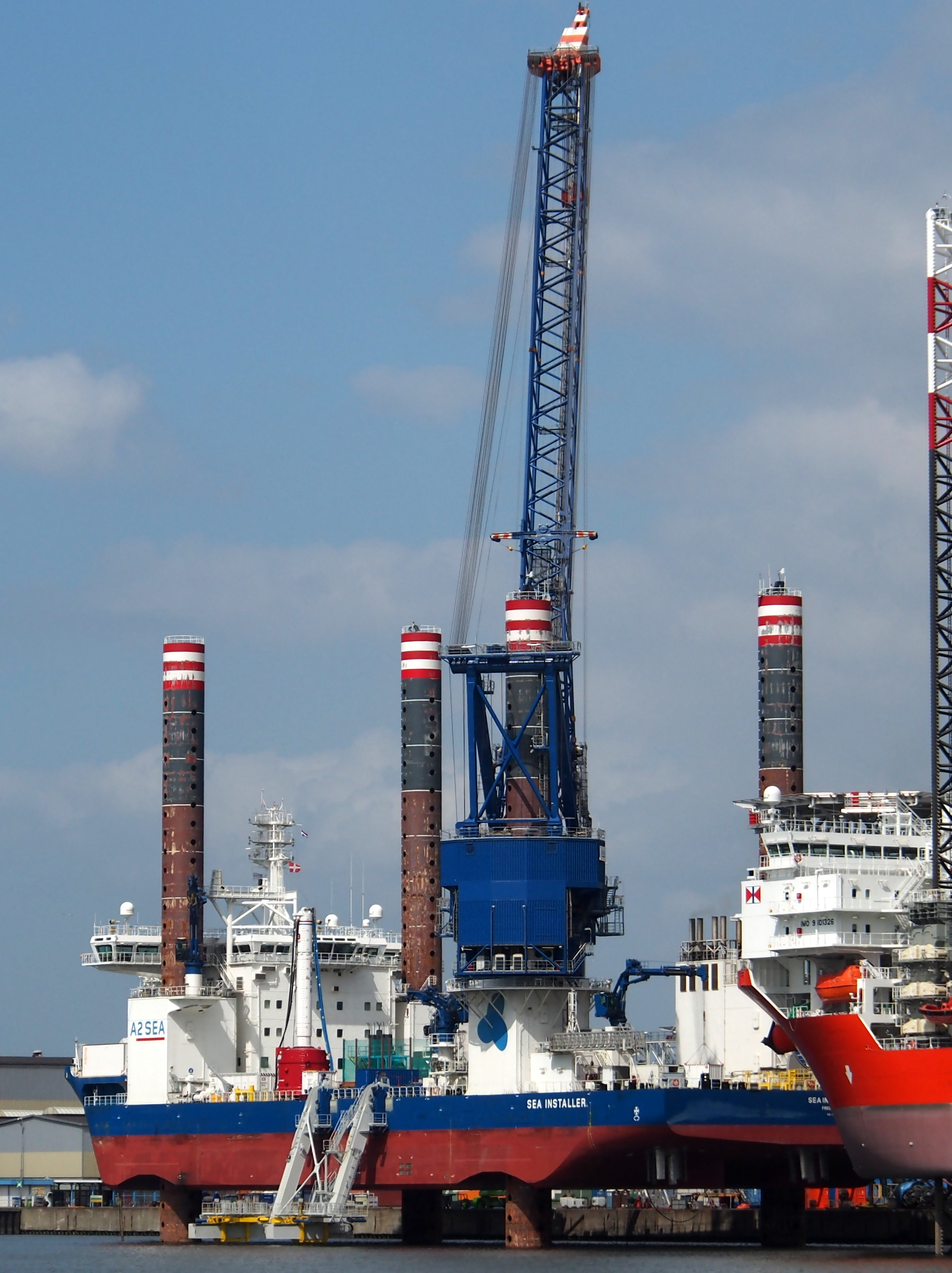

History
- Name: Sea Installer
- Owner: A2SEA
- Operator: A2SEA
- Port of registry: Danish
- Ordered: 2010
- Builder: COSCO Shipyard Group Co.
- Cost: US$139 million
- Acquired: 2012
- Identification: IMO number: 9646481; MMSI number: 219456000; Callsign: OYPY2
- Status: Active

General characteristics
- Class & type: DNV GL
- Type: offshore wind turbine installation jack-up vessel
- Length: 132 m (433 ft)
- Beam: 39 m (128 ft)
- Draft: 5.8 m (19 ft)
- Installed power: 6x MaK 9M25C Diesel engines, 3000 kW each
- Propulsion: Three 3800 kW Voith Schneider cyclorotor main thrusters, three bow thrusters
- Speed: 12 knots (22 km/h; 14 mph)
- Capacity: loading capacity: 5000 tons; crane capacity: 900 tons
- Crew: 60

Sea Installer is an offshore wind turbine installation jack-up vessel. She was ordered by A2SEA, a Danish offshore wind turbine installation company, and it was built by Chinese COSCO Shipyard Group Co., with a contract value is US$139 million.

Sea Installer has a length of 132 metres (433 ft), breadth of 39 metres (128 ft), draft 5.8 metres (19 ft), and she has a speed of 12 knots (22 km/h; 14 mph). She can jack up at water depths of up to 45 metres (148 ft). Her loading capacity is 5000 tons, equal to eight to ten offshore wind turbines. The crane capacity is 900 tons. The vessel can carry up to 60 people.

The vessel was delivered in the second half of 2012.
