= Fisherman's Gat =

Shipping channel in the Thames Estuary

Coordinates: 51°37.370′N 1°20.040′E

Fisherman's Gat is a much-deepened channel in the North Sea, between the final long line of shoals loosely associated with the Thames Estuary. The channel cuts across Long Sand. In the west it opens onto the nominal cut-off point of Knock Deep (north) or the Princes Channel (south) which links to the Strait of Dover. In the west it opens to Black Deep, a Thames approach.

Fisherman's Gat was opened up to shipping as a route through, consequent to the demise of North Edinburgh Channel as a buoyed route. Opened in 2000 with a controlling depth of 7.4 metres, the navigation depth has since increased to 8.3 metres (January 2006). The gat in 1934 had minimum depth of 19 feet (5.8 m), naturally greater around its due east access but much less next to the north-west, its narrows/neck.

Shipping generally approaches Fisherman's Gat from an arc, extending from south of Kentish Knock to the far east, around to North East Spit buoy to the south-southeast. For vessels approaching the Thames Estuary from the south or east, it makes a saving of 20 miles (32 km) and lower pilot charges when compared with the Sunk route to the north. As time passes it is becoming a more dominant use by moderate draft vessels (save those heralding from the north/middle of the North Sea), some of which are still being routed via the Sunk (north end of Black Deep).

== Scope and soundings ==
Excerpt of a chart of 1934. Here, the more shallow (dangerous) the darker-shaded. Click for broader map and to enable varied magnification.
