= TIV MPI Adventure =

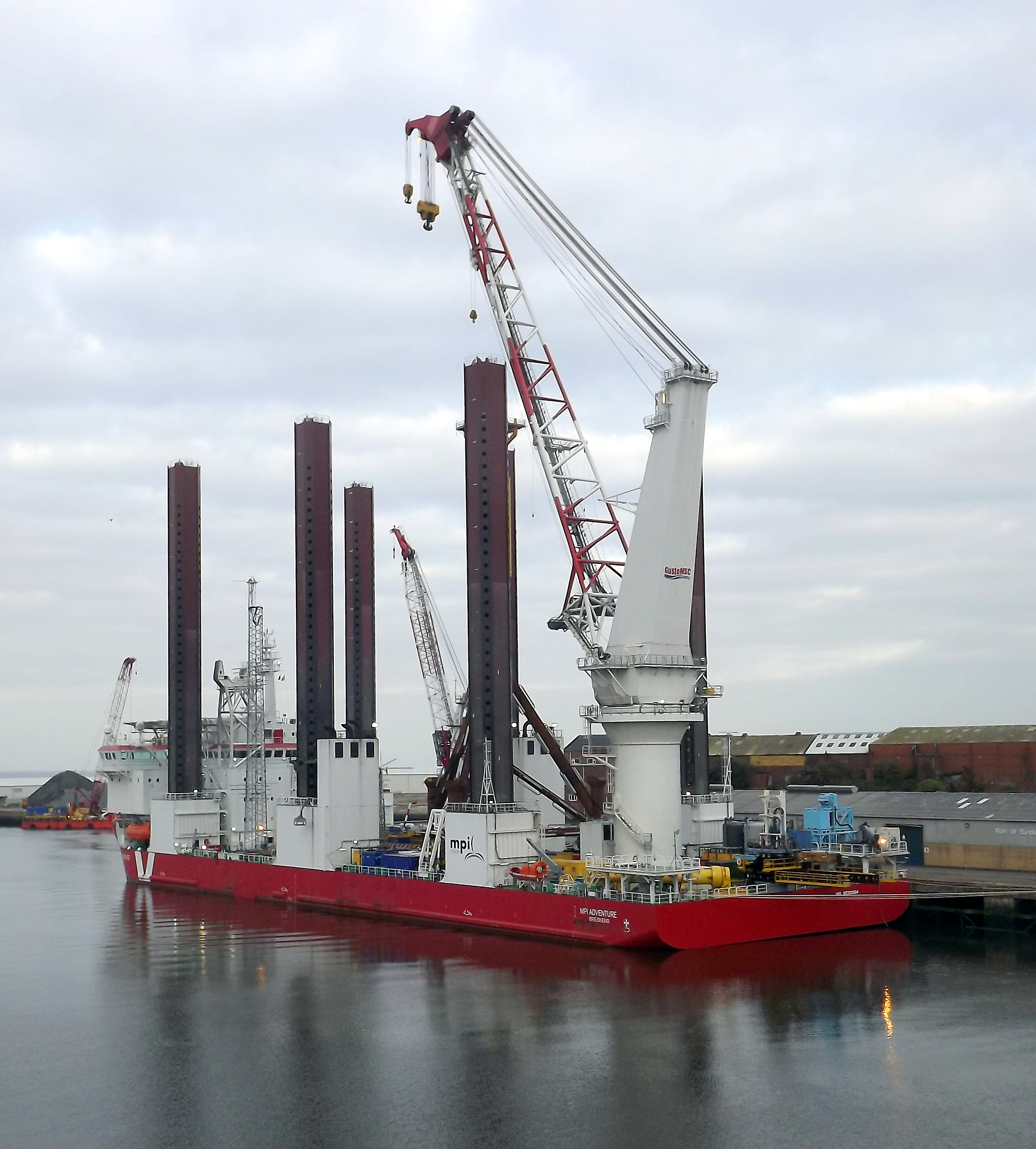
- MPI Adventure on lay by at Corporation Quay, River Wear, Sunderland, 10 October 2012.

History
- Name: MPI Adventure
- Owner: Adventure Shipping BV
- Operator: MPI Offshore
- Port of registry: Breskens, Netherlands
- Builder: Cosco Nantong Shipyard
- Launched: 27 August 2010
- Identification: IMO number: 9530084; MMSI number: 245924000; Call sign: PCKV
- Status: In service

General characteristics
- Class & type: Turbine Installation Vessel
- Tonnage: 14,739 GT; 7,095 DWT
- Length: 138.55 m (454 ft 7 in)
- Beam: 40.80 m (133 ft 10 in)
- Draft: 3.5 m (11 ft 6 in) (minimum); 5.5 m (18 ft 1 in) (maximum)
- Depth: 10.00 m (32 ft 10 in)
- Installed power: Six diesel engines
- Propulsion: Three azimuth thrusters, three bow thrusters
- Speed: 12.5 knots (23.2 km/h; 14.4 mph)
- Crew: 112, facilities for 200 people
- Notes: Developed from TIV MPI Resolution, sister ship TIV MPI Discovery

TIV MPI Adventure is a 14,739 GT wind turbine installation vessel that was built in 2010 by Cosco Nantong Shipyard, China.

== Description ==
MPI Adventure is 138.55 metres (454 ft 7 in) long, with a beam of 40.80 metres (133 ft 10 in). She has a draught of between 3.5 metres (11 ft 6 in) and 5.5 metres (18 ft 1 in), with a depth of 10.00 metres (32 ft 10 in). She has an air draught of 67.00 metres (219 ft 10 in) when operating at a 5 metres (16 ft 5 in) draught. The ship is propelled by three Rolls-Royce US 355 FP azimuth thrusters. She has three bow thrusters. These are powered by six 3,625bhp Rolls-Royce Bergen C25:33L-8 diesel engines.

MPI Adventure has accommodation for 112 crew, with a maximum of 200 people able to be accommodated on board. Equipment installed includes a crane which has a capacity of 1,000 tonnes (980 long tons) at 25 metres (82 ft) radius. An auxiliary crane has a capacity of 160 tonnes (160 long tons) at 70 metres (230 ft) radius and a third crane has a capacity of 50 tonnes (49 long tons) at 25 metres (82 ft) radius. The ship is fitted with six 73.00 metres (239 ft 6 in) jacking legs. She can jack up in waves 3.5 metres (11 ft) high and at windspeeds of up to 14 metres per second (27 kn) with a maximum current of 1.86 metres per second (3.62 kn). Once jacked up, the ship can operate in waves of 10.00 metres (32 ft 10 in) high, windspeeds up to 36 metres per second (70 kn) and currents of 2.21 metres per second (4.30 kn). She can operate in water up to 40 metres (130 ft) deep, with the legs sinking into the seabed by 5 metres (16 ft) and the ship raised 7.80 metres (25 ft 7 in) above the surface of the sea.

== History ==
MPI Adventure was launched on 27 August 2010. The naming ceremony was held on 19 January 2011 at Qidong, Jiangsu, China. She was delivered to the United Kingdom from China on 21 March 2011. MPI Adventure is flagged to the Netherlands. She is allocated the IMO Number 9530084, the MMSI Number 245924000 and the Call sign PCKV.

MPI Adventure was used to install wind turbines in the London Array.
