= London Array =

Wind farm in the Thames Estuary, England

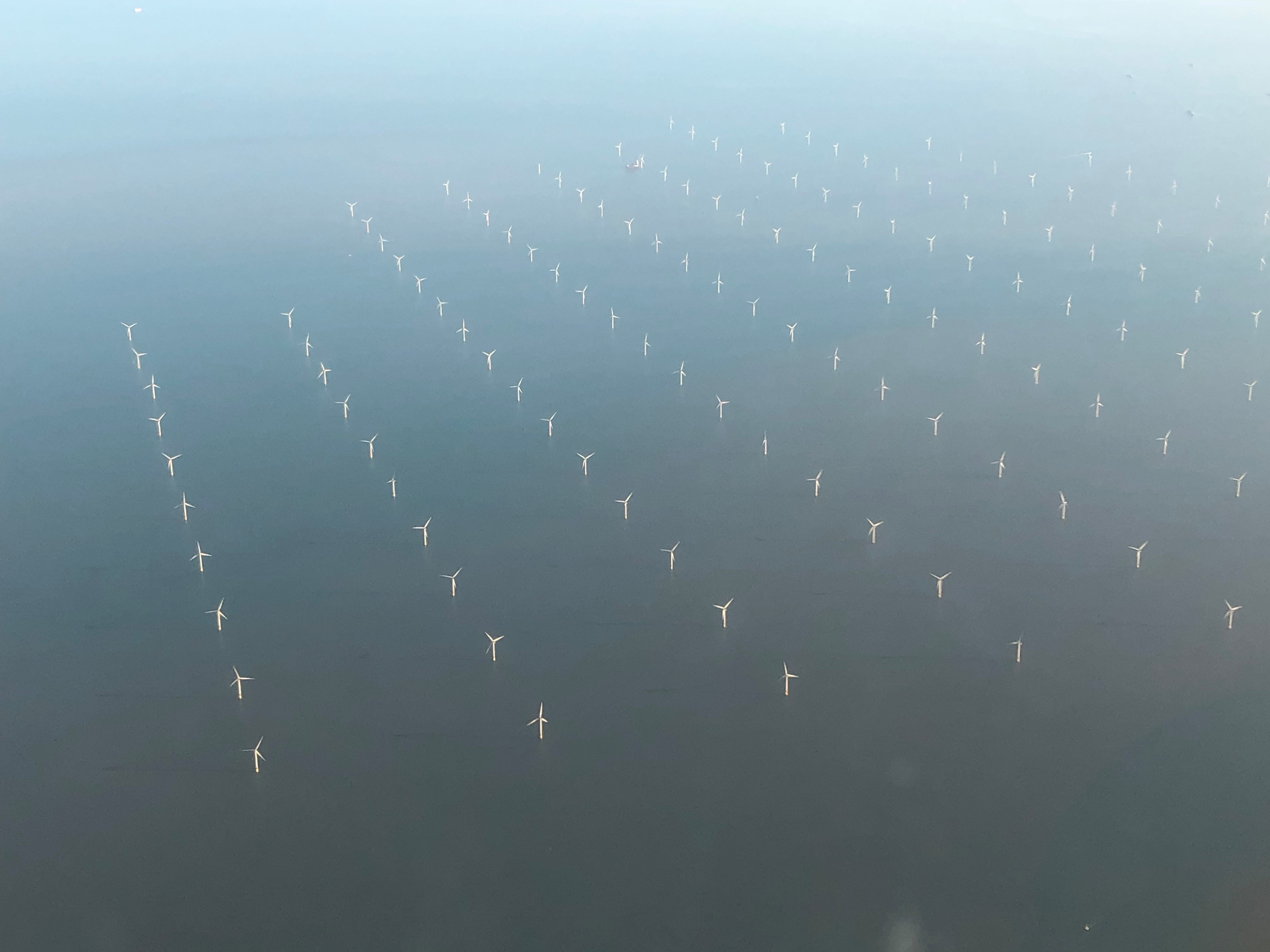
- The London Array as seen from an aeroplane flying in to London City Airport
- Official name: London Array
- Country: United Kingdom
- Location: 7 mi (11 km) off North Foreland, Kent
- Coordinates: 51°38′38″N 1°33′13″E
- Status: Operational
- Commission date: October 2012
- Construction cost: £1.8 billion
- Owners: E.ON UK; Greencoat UK Wind; La Caisse; Masdar

Wind farm
- Type: Offshore
- Max. water depth: 25 m (82 ft)
- Distance from shore: 20 kilometres (12 mi)
- Hub height: 87 metres (285 ft)
- Rotor diameter: 120 metres (390 ft)
- Site area: 122 km^{2} (47 sq mi)

Power generation
- Units operational: 175 × 3.6 MW
- Make and model: Siemens Gamesa SWT-3.6-120 (175)
- Nameplate capacity: 630 MW
- Capacity factor: 45.3% (2015)
- Annual net output: 2,500 GWh (2015)

External links
- Website: www.londonarray.com
- Commons: Related media on Commons

Wind farm layout

The London Array is a 175-turbine 630 MW Round 2 offshore wind farm located 20 kilometres (12 mi) off the Kent coast in the outer Thames Estuary in England. It was the largest offshore wind farm in the world until Walney Extension reached full production in September 2018.

Construction of phase 1 of the wind farm began in March 2011 and was completed by mid 2013, being formally inaugurated by the Prime Minister, David Cameron on 4 July 2013.

The second phase of the project was refused planning consent in 2014 due to concerns over the impact on sea birds.

== Description ==
The wind farm site is more than 20 kilometres (12 mi) off the North Foreland on the Kent coast. It is in the area between Long Sand and Kentish Knock, between Margate in Kent and Clacton in Essex. The site has water depths of no more than 25 m and is mostly away from deep water shipping lanes. It is north of the shallow cross estuary channel, the Fisherman's Gat and astride of the Foulger's Gat.

The first phase consisted of 175 Siemens Wind Power SWT-3.6 turbines and two offshore substations, giving a wind farm with a peak rated power of 630 MW. Each turbine and offshore substation is erected on a monopile foundation, and connected together by 210 km (130 mi) of 33 kV array cables. The two offshore substations are connected to an onshore substation at Cleve Hill (near Graveney) on the north Kent coast, by four 150 kV subsea export cables, in total 220 km (140 mi). It is named after London because the power goes to the London grid.

The smaller Thanet Wind Farm is to the south.

The array is intended to reduce annual CO_{2} emissions by about 900,000 tons, equal to the emissions of 300,000 passenger cars.

== History ==
In 2001 environmental studies identified areas of the outer Thames Estuary as potential sites for offshore wind farms; the Department of Trade and Industry published the paper Future Offshore — A Strategic Framework for the Offshore Wind Industry, which identified the outer Thames Estuary as one of three potential areas for future wind farm development (Round 2 wind farms). The Crown Estate awarded a 50-year lease to London Array Ltd (a consortium of E.ON UK Renewables, Shell WindEnergy, and CORE Limited (Note: After 26 June 2007, Core Limited became known as DONG Energy London Array Limited. Core Ltd. was a joint venture between DONG Energy A/S (Denmark) and Farm Energy Ltd (UK); see notes in E.ON 7 November 2007 press release.)) in December 2003. A planning application was submitted in 2005, which was approved in December 2006. Planning permission for the onshore electricity substation was granted in November 2007.

In May 2008, Shell announced that it was pulling out of the project. It was announced in July 2008 that E.ON UK and DONG Energy would buy Shell's stake. Subsequently, on 16 October 2008, London Array announced the Abu Dhabi based Masdar would join E.ON as a joint venture party in the scheme. Under the agreement, Masdar purchased 40% of E.ON's half share of the scheme, giving Masdar a 20% stake in the project overall. The resultant ownership was 50% DONG Energy, 30% E.ON UK Renewables and 20% Masdar.

In March 2009, the backers agreed on an initial investment of €2.2 billion. Financing of phase 1 was achieved through the European Investment Bank and the Danish Export Credit Fund with £250 million.

In 2013, in response to Ofgem "Offshore Transmission Owner" regulations, the consortium divested the electrical transmission assets of the wind farm (valued at £459 million) to Blue Transmission London Array Limited – an entity incorporated by Barclays Infrastructure Funds Management Limited (Barclays) and Diamond UK Transmission Corporation (a Mitsubishi Corporation subsidiary).

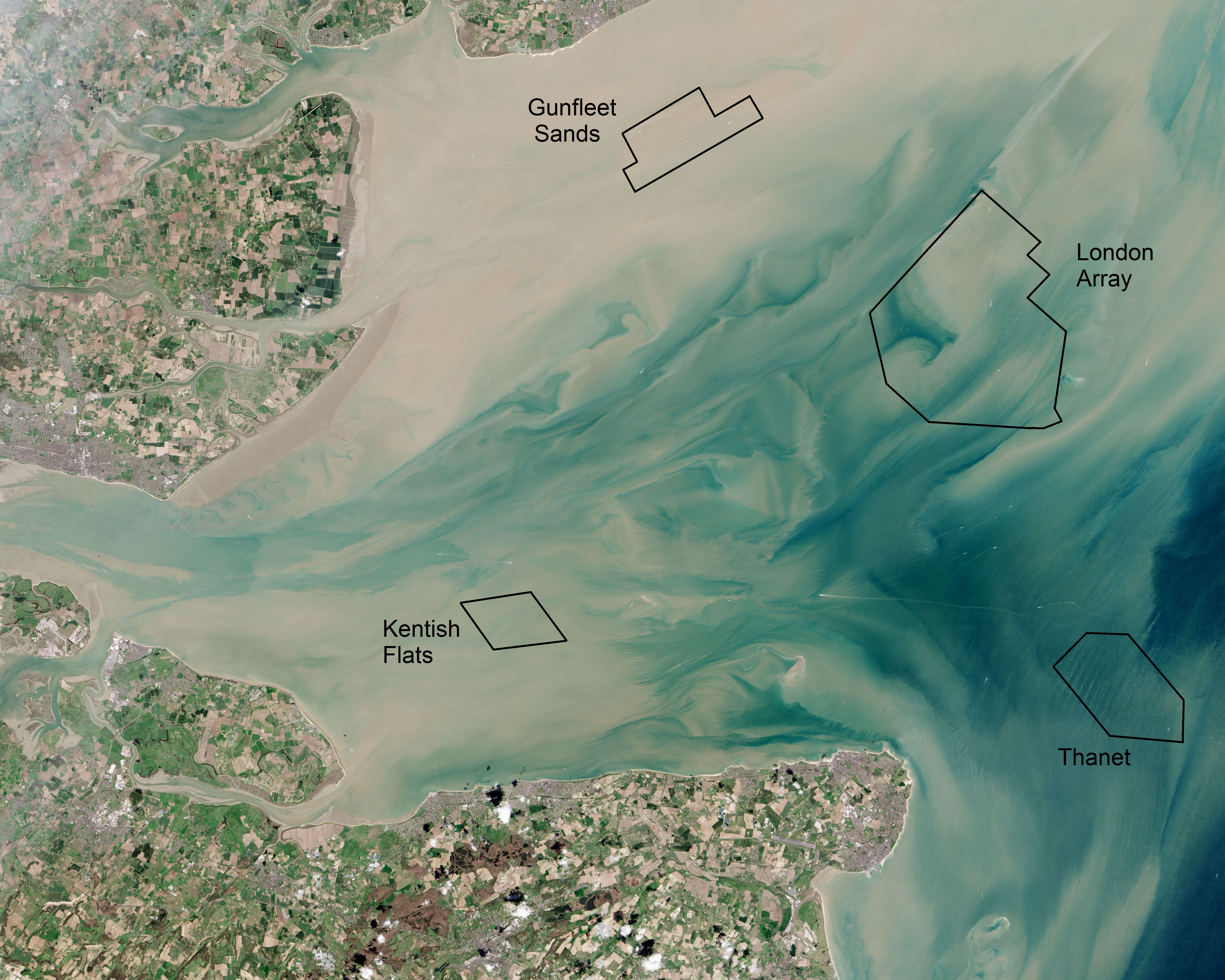
Satellite image of the Thames Estuary with London Array top right, and neighbouring wind farm areas.

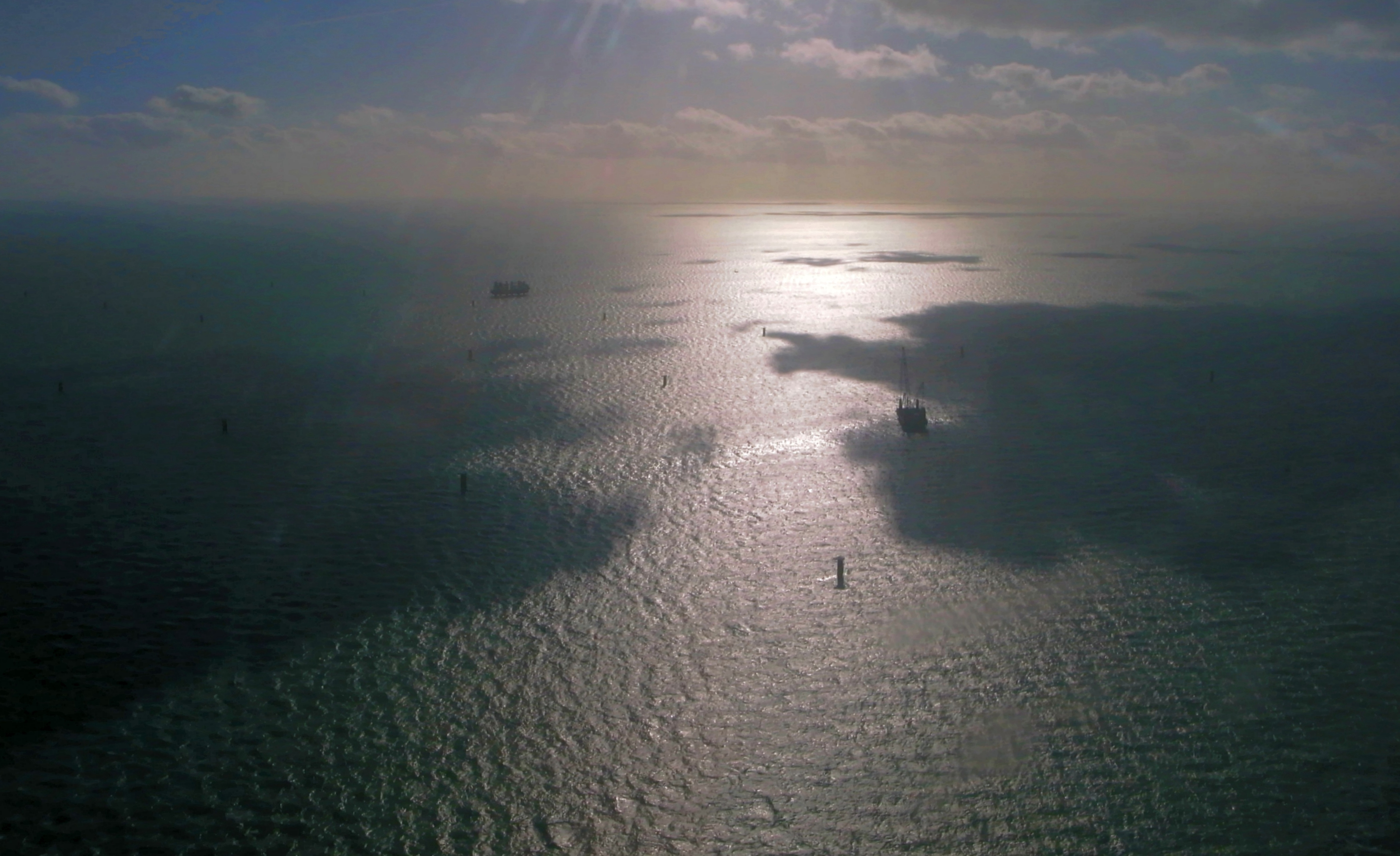
London Array under construction 2009 viewed from light aircraft GBIRT

In January 2014, DONG sold half its stake to Quebec public pension plan manager Caisse de dépôt et placement du Québec ("La Caisse"), and in 2023 sold its remaining 25% share to Schroders Greencoat for £717 million (£4.56 m/MW). Following RWE's takeover of E.ON's power generation in an asset swap in 2019, RWE now owns the 30% stake previously belonging to E.ON.

At the time of its construction, it was the largest offshore wind farm in the world.

=== Construction and commissioning ===
Offshore work began in March 2011 with construction of the first foundation.

Turbines were supplied by Siemens Wind Power. Their foundations were built by a joint-venture between Per Aarsleff and Bilfinger Berger Ingenieurbau GmbH. The same company supplied and installed the monopiles. Generators were installed by MPI and A2SEA, using an installation vessel TIV MPI Adventure and a jack-up barge Sea Worker. Two offshore substations were designed, fabricated and installed by Future Energy, a joint venture between Fabricom, Iemants and Geosea, while electrical systems and onshore substation work was undertaken by Siemens Transmission & Distribution. The subsea export cable was supplied by Nexans and array cables by JDR Cable Systems. The array cables and the export cables were installed by VSMC.

The wind farm started producing electricity at the end of October 2012. All 175 turbines of phase 1 were confirmed fully operational on 8 April 2013, and the wind farm was formally inaugurated by the Prime minister David Cameron on 4 July 2013. In December 2015 it produced 369 GWh, a monthly capacity factor of 78.9%. It produced 2.5 TWh in 2015. During two days of January 2016, production varied from 3 MW to 619 MW.

Its levelised cost has been estimated at £140/MWh.

=== Phase 2 ===
A second phase was planned which would have seen a further 166 turbines installed to increase the capacity to 1000 MW. However, the second phase was scaled back and finally cancelled in February 2014 after concerns were raised by the Royal Society for the Protection of Birds about its effect on a local population of red-throated divers.

== See also ==
- List of offshore wind farms in the United Kingdom
- List of offshore wind farms
- List of offshore wind farms in the North Sea
