= Thames Estuary =

Mouth of the River Thames in England

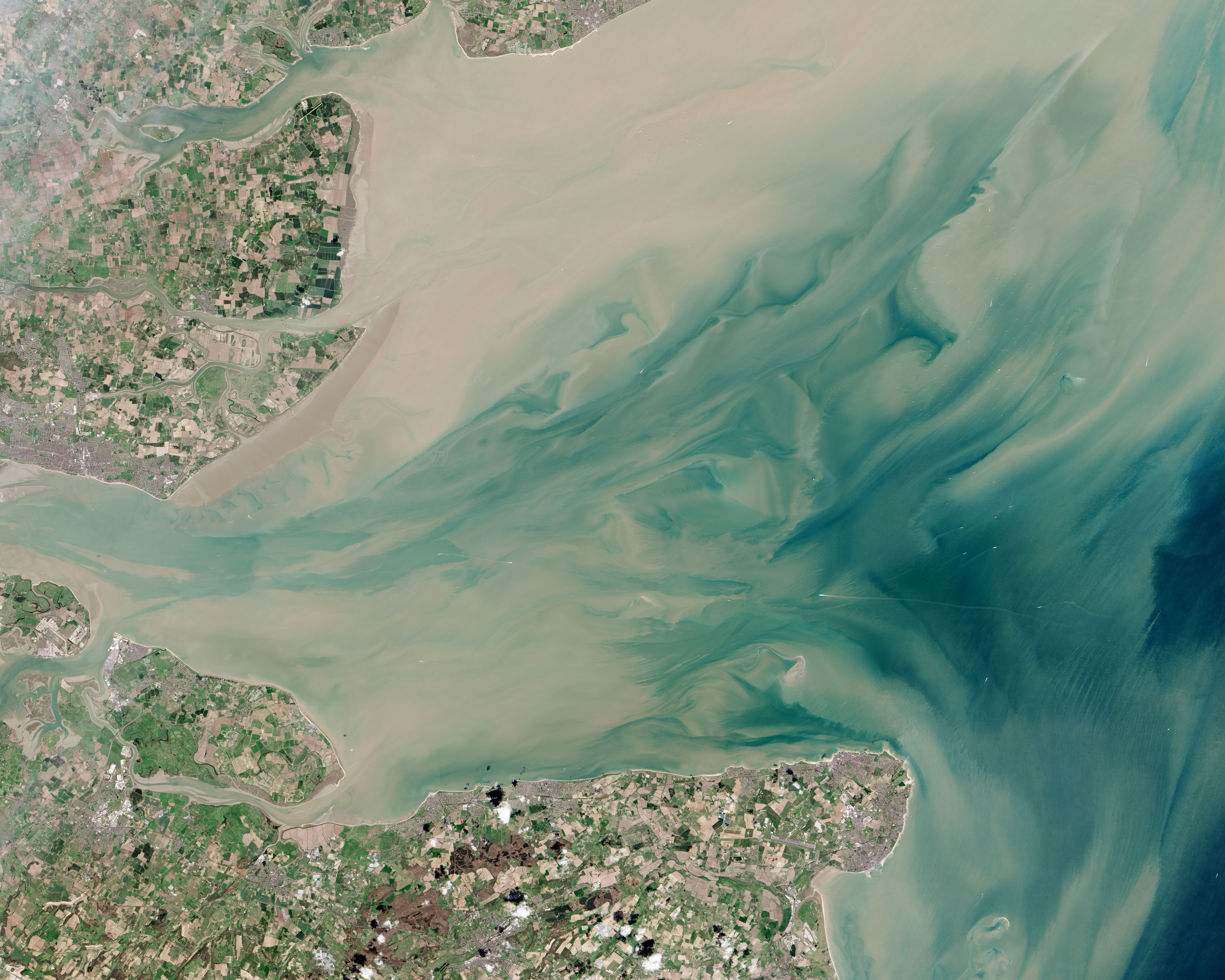
The half of the estuary that lies east of its narrow Tideway-named part, by the Operational Land Imager

The Thames Estuary is where the River Thames meets the waters of the North Sea, in the south-east of Great Britain.

== Limits ==
An estuary can be defined according to different criteria (e.g. tidal, geographical, navigational or in terms of salinity). For this reason the limits of the Thames Estuary have been defined differently at different times and for different purposes.

=== Western ===
This limit of the estuary has been defined in two main ways:

- The narrow estuary is strongly tidal and is known as the Tideway. It starts in south-west London at Teddington Lock and weir, Teddington/Ham. This point is also mid-way between Richmond Lock which only keeps back a few miles of human-made head (stasis) of water during low tide and the extreme modern-era head at Thames Ditton Island on Kingston reach where slack water occurs at maximal high tide in times of rainfall-caused flooded banks. In terms of salinity, the transition from freshwater to estuarine occurs around Battersea; east of the Thames Barrier the water is of notable brackishness where fish, particularly in dry summers on the flood (the incoming) tide, are estuarine.
- The head of Sea Reach – the Kent / Essex Strait – south of Canvey Island on the northern (Essex) shore. This reach and all more eastern zones (a mixture of channels and shoals) have a width that contributes to the large, archetypal, internal but mainly submerged sandbanks. These come from a combination of silt-borne fluvial and tidal scouring and deposition (silting).

=== Eastern ===
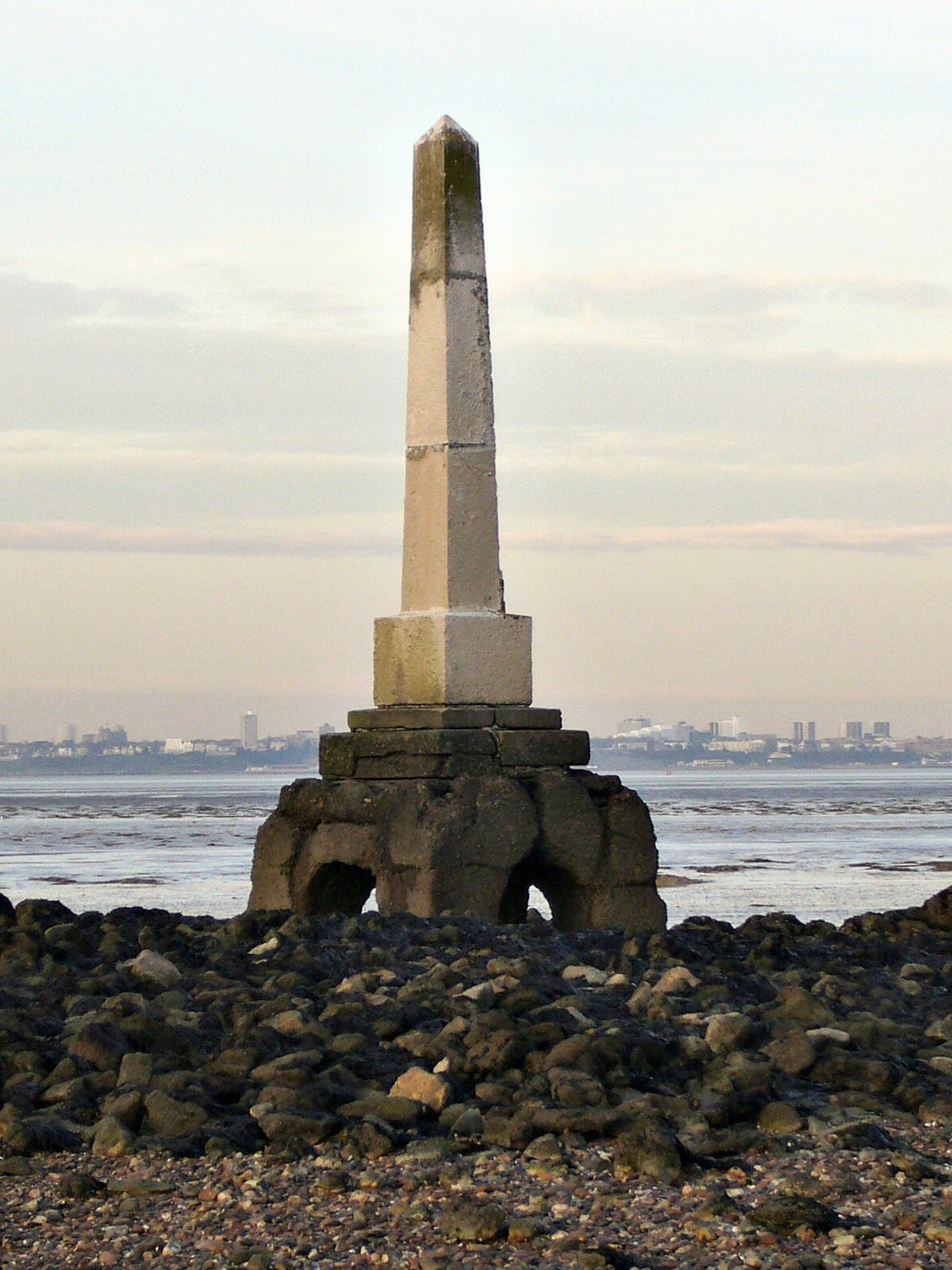
London Stone, Yantlet Creek

The transition between the Thames Estuary and the North Sea has been located at various notional boundaries, including:

- The Yantlet Line between the Crow Stone (London Stone) on the northern foreshore at Chalkwell, Westcliff-on-Sea and another London Stone off the Isle of Grain, to the south. (This marked the seaward limit of the river jurisdiction successively of the City of London and the Thames Conservancy).
- A line between Havengore Creek, Essex (to the north), and Warden Point, east Sheppey, Kent (to the south), tallying with the easternmost hazardous point of the Nore sandbank. (This formed the seaward limit of the Port of London Authority on its establishment in 1908).
- A line between North Foreland, Margate, Kent via the Kentish Knock lighthouse to Harwich in Essex. Here begin sandbanks of the bight of this shallow sea. Per a Hydrological Survey of 1882–9. (This tallies with the eastern edge of the current seaward limit of the Port of London Authority as defined in 1964).

== Tides ==
The estuary just east of the Tideway has a tidal range of 4 metres. Winds excluded, it moves at 2.6 knots (4.8 km/h; 3.0 mph) in bi-monthly spring tides.

== Economy ==
=== Shipping ===
The estuary is one of the largest of 170 such inlets on the coast of Great Britain. It constitutes a major shipping route, with thousands of movements each year, including: large oil tankers, container ships, bulk carriers (of loose materials/liquids), and roll-on/roll-off (ro-ro) ferries. It is the accessway for the Port of London (including London Gateway, associated Tilbury and Purfleet) and the Medway Ports of Sheerness, Chatham and Thamesport.

The traditional Thames sailing barge worked in this area, designed to be suitable for the shallow waters in the smaller ports.

=== Wind farms ===
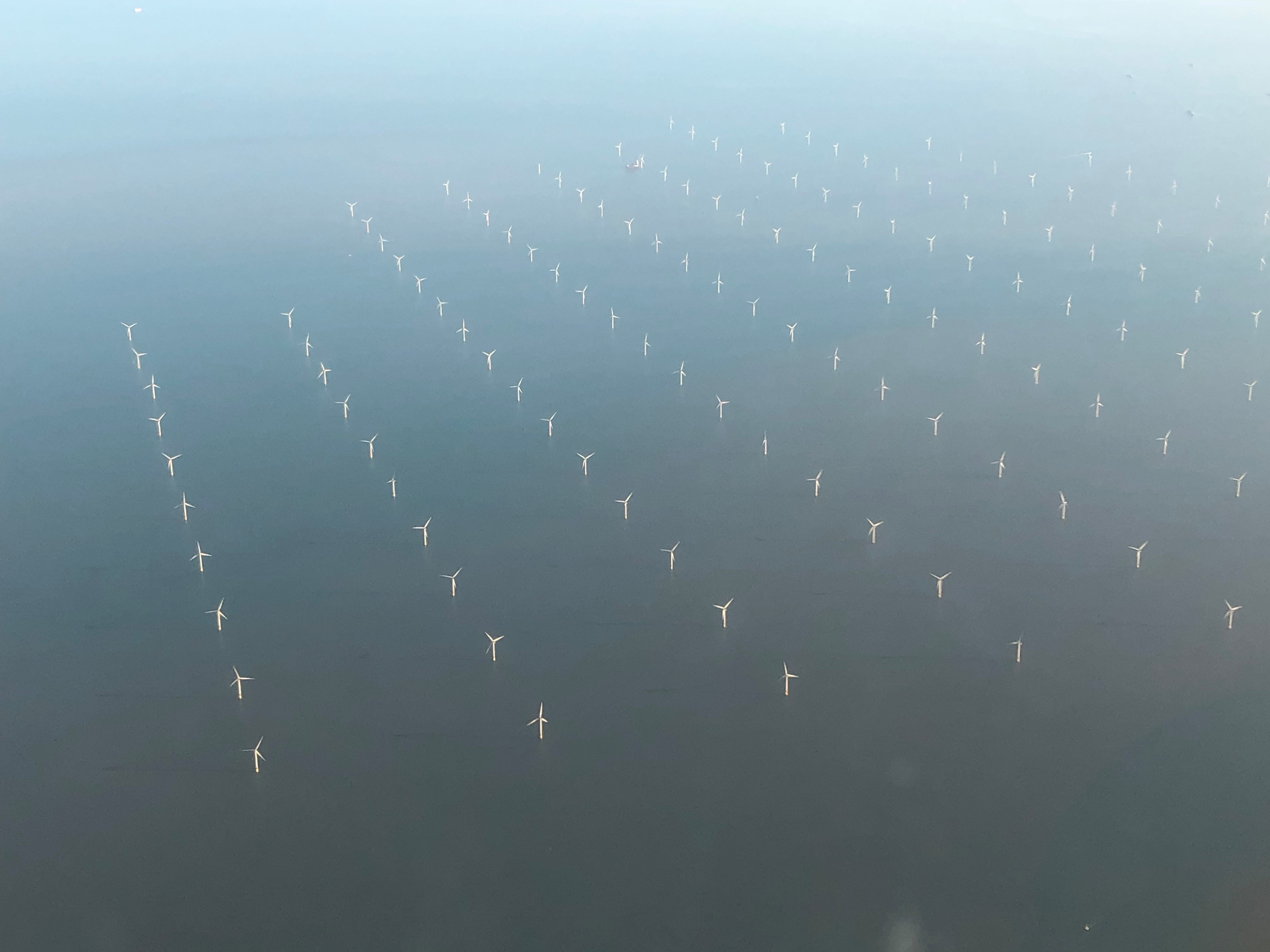
Wind farms in the estuary, in this case the London Array.

A 2000s-decade-built wind farm is 8.5 km north of Herne Bay, Kent, on a shoal south-west of Kentish Knock. It is 30 wind turbines generating typically 82.4MW of electricity.

The much larger 630 MW London Array was inaugurated in 2013.

== Greater Thames Estuary ==
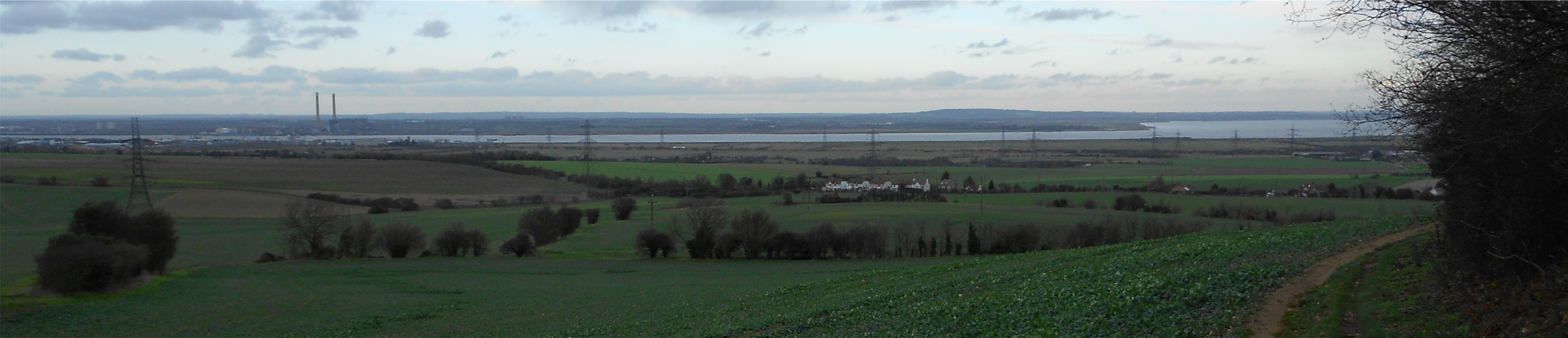
A western cross-section of the estuary. Background runs from Tilbury (left) to Mucking Creek: looking north from Shorne, which is 4 kilometres (2.5 mi) south of the river

The term Greater Thames Estuary applies to the coast and the low-lying lands bordering the estuary. These are characterised by the presence of mudflats, low-lying open beaches, and salt marshes, namely the North Kent Marshes and the Essex Marshes. Human-made embankments are backed by reclaimed wetland grazing areas, but rising sea levels may make it necessary briefly to flood some of that land at spring tides, to take the pressure off the defences and main watercourses.

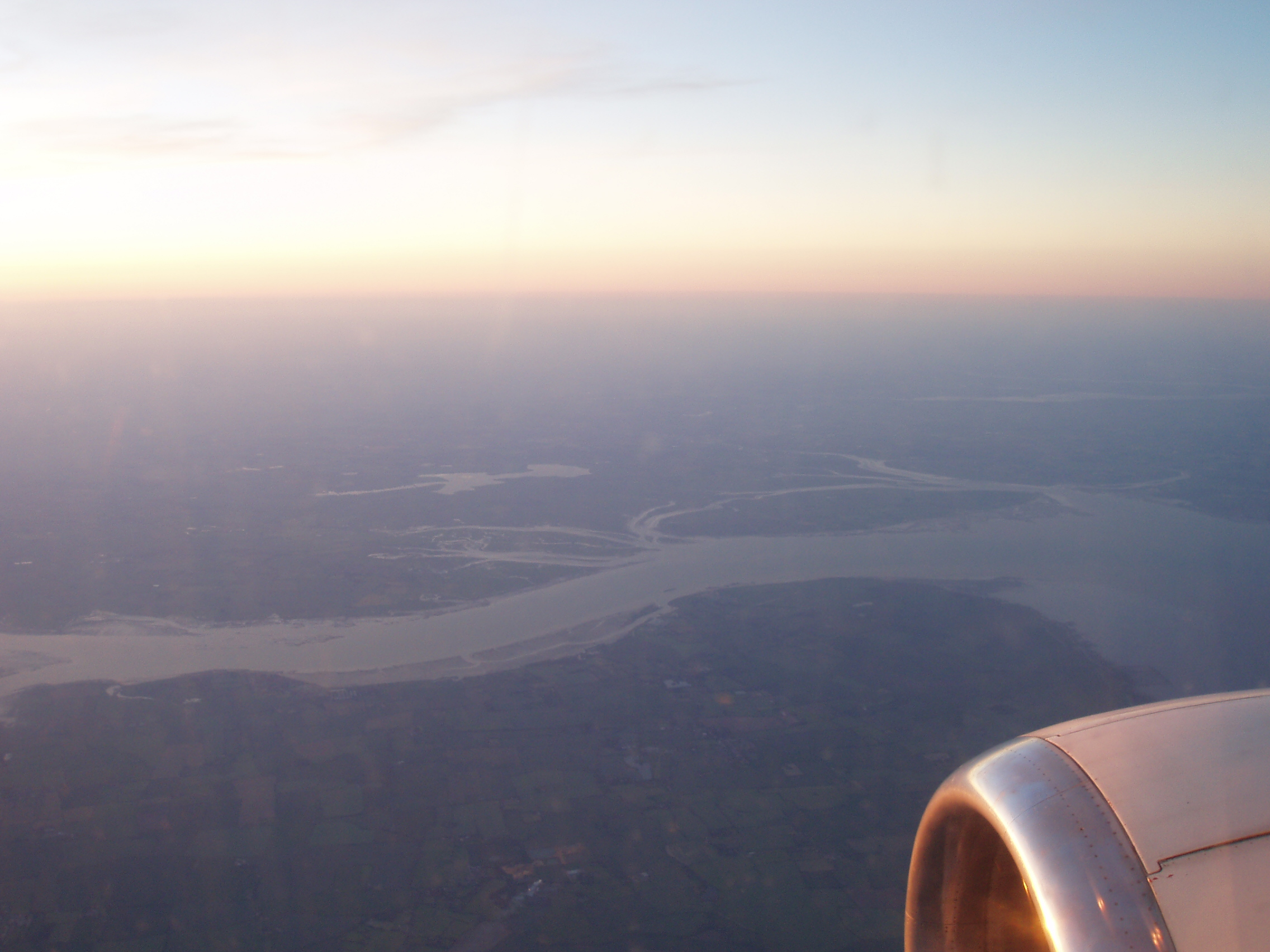
The Blackwater Estuary, on the Essex coast, in the northern part of the Greater Thames Estuary. Mersea Island is on the right.

There are many smaller estuaries in Essex, including the rivers Colne, Blackwater and Crouch. Small coastal villages depend on an economy of fishing, boat-building, and yachting. The Isle of Sheppey, the Isle of Grain, Canvey Island, Two Tree Island, Havengore Island, New England Island, Rushley Island, Potton Island, Foulness Island and Mersea Island are part of the coastline.

Where higher land reaches the coast, there are some larger settlements, such as Clacton-on-Sea to the north in Essex, Herne Bay, Kent, and the Southend-on-Sea area within the narrower part of the estuary.

The Thames Estuary is the focal part of the 21st-century toponym, the "Thames Gateway", designated as one of the principal development areas in Southern England.

The Thames Estuary 2050 Growth Commission report published in June 2018 identified the economic potential of the region. In 2020 the Thames Estuary Growth Board was appointed, led by government-appointed Envoy Kate Willard OBE, to unlock the potential of the UK's number one green growth opportunity.

Entrepreneurs and investors have looked at the greater estuary as a possible place for a new airport, and have expanded Southend Airport in the 2010s, which has a rail link to Liverpool Street station, London among others.

== Salinity ==
Designations

Ramsar Wetland
- Official name: Thames Estuary and Marshes
- Designated: 5 May 2000
- Reference no.: 1025

The Thames flowing through London is an archetypal, well-developed economy urban, upper river estuary with its sedimentary deposition restricted through manmade embankments and occasional dredging of parts. It is mainly a freshwater river about as far east as Battersea, insofar as the average salinity is very low and the fish fauna consists predominantly of freshwater species such as roach, dace, carp, perch, and pike. It becomes brackish between Battersea and Gravesend, and the diversity of freshwater fish is smaller, primarily roach and dace. Euryhaline species then dominate, such as flounder, European seabass, mullet, and smelt. Further east salinity increases and conditions become fully marine and the fish fauna resemble that of the adjacent North Sea, a spectrum of euryhaline and stenohaline types. An alike pattern of zones applies to the aquatic plants and invertebrates.

== Cultural references ==
Joseph Conrad lived in Stanford-le-Hope close to the Essex marshes. His The Mirror of the Sea (1906) contains a memorable description of the area as seen from the Thames. He refers to this area in the first pages of his novel Heart of Darkness, describing it as both the launching place of England's great ships of exploration and colonization and, in ancient times, the site of colonization of the British Isles by the Roman Empire.

Accent

The form of speech of many of the people of the area, principally the accents of those from Kent and Essex, is often known as Estuary English. The term is a term for a milder variety of the "London Accent". The spread of Estuary English extends many hundreds of miles outside London, and all of the neighbouring home counties around London have residents who moved from London and brought their version of London accents with them, leading to interference with the established local accents. The term London Accent is generally avoided, as it can have many meanings. Forms of "Estuary English", as a hybrid between Received pronunciation and various London accents, can be heard in all of the New Towns, all of the coastal resorts, and in the larger cities and towns along the Thames Estuary.

== Channels ==
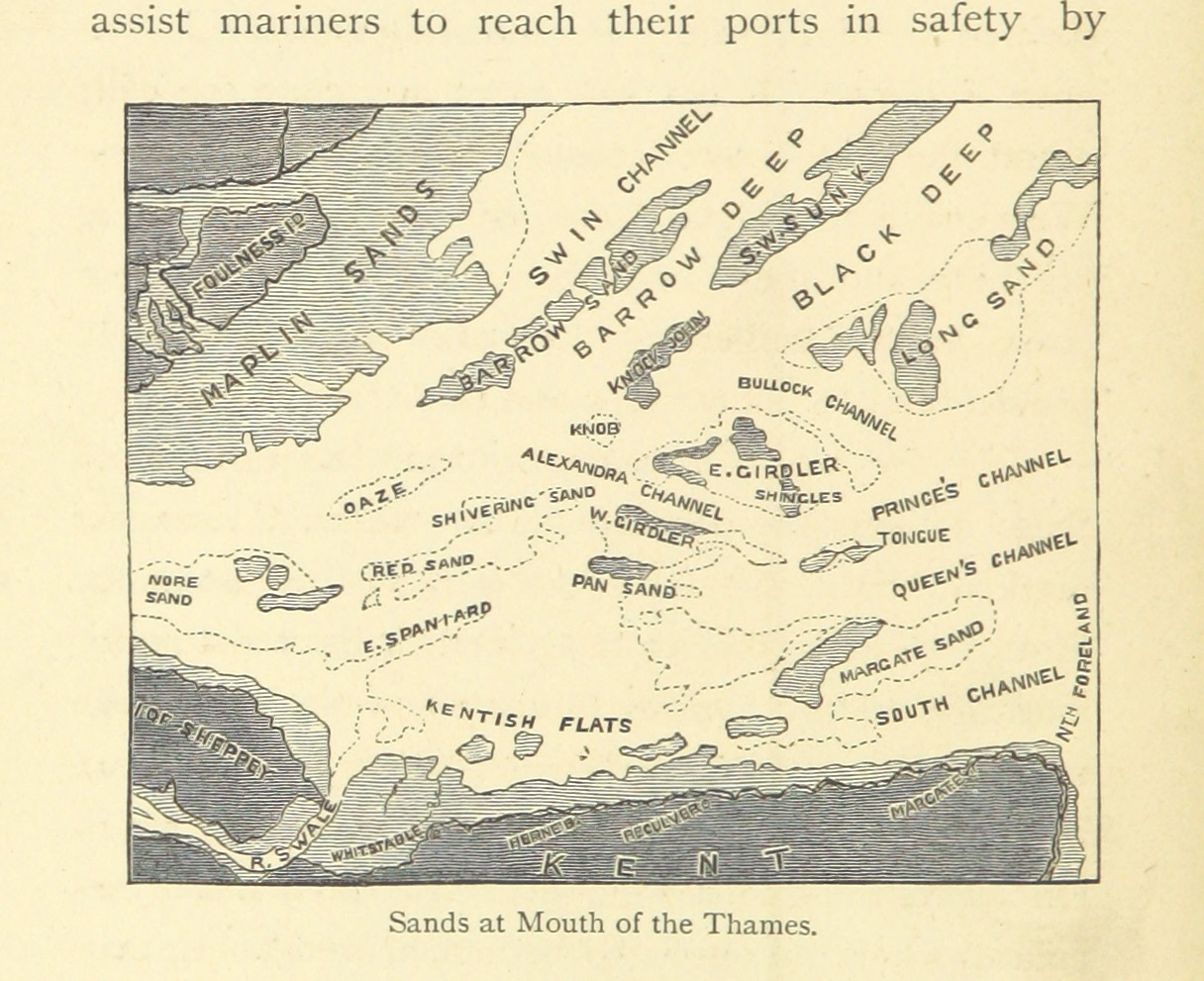
Simplified naval chart of 1884

For commercial shipping rounding the Nore sandbank and thus accessing Greater London, main deep-water routes were the Princes-Queens Channel and the South Channel to the south, to a lesser extent the Kings Channel and the Swin to the north. The Swin was used by barges and leisure craft from the Essex rivers, and coasters and colliers from the north east. These channels were made up of natural troughs; Yantlet Channel (Sea Reach), Oaze Deep, Knock John Channel, Black Deep/Black Deep Channel which have been much-marked. These are separated by slow-moving sandbanks with names such as the East and West Barrows, the Nob, the Knock, Kentish Knock, the John, the Sunk, the Girdler, and Long Sand/the Long Sands.

Shallow-bottomed barges and coasters would navigate the swatchways at flood tide, and would cross the sand banks at spitways, points where the water was least shallow, and just deep enough at that point of the tide. If they missed the moment they would heave to (lay anchor) and wait for the next tide.

Recreational craft are expected use channels most suited to the size of their vessel. Their main guide says to use when navigating to or from:

- the north: the Middle Deep, Swin, Warp and Barrow Deep.
- the south/due east: the Horse and Gore and Four Fathom Channels.

To cross the south-east quarter of the estuary large vessels use Fisherman's Gat, and small vessels to were expected to use Foulger's Gat.

== Navigational marks ==
=== History ===
'Mapp' of the Thames Estuary by Capt. Greenvile Collins, 1698. (North is to the right; rhumb lines are shown. London is beyond the top left of the chart).

Provision of buoys and beacons for the purpose of navigation came relatively late to England (compared to the Netherlands, for example). Instead, coastal navigators and pilots relied on the use of transits (the alignment of prominent structures or natural features on land) for guidance. In 1566 Trinity House of Deptford (which oversaw pilotage on the Thames) was empowered to 'make, erect and set up [...] beacons, marks and signs for the sea' (albeit at its own expense). Not long afterwards, the decay of the steeple of Margate Church (an important landmark for negotiating 'the Narrows', a complex route between sandbanks used by vessels sailing to or from London along the North Kent coast) led to Trinity House marking the Narrows with buoys in the late 16th century.

In his coastal survey of 1682-93, Greenvile Collins records five buoys around the Narrows, just north of Reculver, on the southern approach to the Thames. The Swin (the northern approach) was marked with buoys at the easternmost points of the Gunfleet, Middle and Buxey sands, and by beacons on the Whitaker, Shoe and Blacktail spits. A buoy marked the easternmost point of the Nore sandbank at this time, and three more buoys marked sandbanks in the middle part of the estuary (Spaniard, Red Sand and the Oaze).

The Nore Lightship, the world's first lightvessel, was established in the Estuary as a private venture in 1732 to mark the 'best position for entering the Thames and Medway, and to clear the Nore Sand'. The coastwise approach from the north was aided by the establishment of the Sunk lightvessel in 1802 'to mark the north-east entrance to East Swin, and to guide vessels round Long Sand'. Later, the Swin channel was further marked by lightvessels at Swin Middle (1837) and Mouse (1838), and by screw-pile lighthouses on the Maplin Sands (1841) and at Gunfleet (1856). Meanwhile, one of the outlying sandbanks of the Estuary was marked by a lightvessel at Kentish Knock (in 1840); and in due course the southern approach was marked by lightvessels at the Tongue (1847) and Girdler (1848) sands, with another being added (between these two) in the Princes Channel (1856). In 1851 two more screw-pile lighthouses were built further upriver, on the northern foreshore of Sea Reach: at Mucking and on the Chapman sands (just off Canvey Island).

Prior to 1684 beacons were set up on the mudflats north of the Swin channel, to help vessels approaching the Thames from the north to navigate the sands. Pan-sand Beacon was set up by Trinity House in 1774 to mark a dangerous sandbank on the southern approach. Similar daymarks were set up on other nearby sandbanks in later years, including on Margate Hook (1843), Middle Ground (1844) and Shingles (1846). Trinity House also maintained beacons further upriver, including at Broadness (established in 1821), Stoneness (1839), Erith (1830) and Tripcock (1832).

In 1864 responsibility for maintaining the navigation lights of the River Thames between London Bridge and Yantlet was transferred by Act of Parliament from the Thames Conservancy to the Corporation of Trinity House; responsibility for buoyage was transferred likewise in 1878. In 1885 the beacons at Broadness and Stoneness were replaced with iron-frame experimental lighthouses, each lit by a novel system which would allow the light to function unattended (except for a twice-weekly visit by a boatman for cleaning and maintenance). Broadness was lit by Pintsch gas, and Stoneness by a Lindberg light (which burned petroleum naphtha). At the same time Trinity House began experimenting with the application of lamps to buoys, using Pintsch's oil-gas system, beginning with three in the Thames Estuary (East Oaze, Ovens and Sheerness Middle); the experiment was deemed a success and subsequently further buoys and beacons were lit by Trinity House using the same system, in the Estuary and beyond.

Today the Port of London Authority's Thames Navigation Service (established in 1959) is responsible for buoyage, beaconage and bridge lights on the Tideway. Trinity House remains responsible for aids to navigation in the wider estuary (and beyond).

=== Thames estuary navigation marks ===
This table shows, from west to east, the principal navigation lights, buoys and other marks to the north (port) and south (starboard) of the main deep-water channels of the River Thames from Gallions Reach to the Sunk Light Float. The Thames is in IALA region A so port buoys are red and starboard buoys are green.

Name of navigational mark	South of channel			Channel	North of channel		
Name of navigational mark	Type	Light	Location coordinate	Channel	Type	Light	Location coordinate
Margaretness Point (or Tripcock Ness) Light	Lighthouse	Group flashing (2) white 5s	51°30.662′N 0°05.766′E	Gallions Reach / Barking Reach	̶	̶	̶
Crossness Point Light	Lighthouse	Flashing white 5s	51°30.920′N 0°07.990′E	Barking Reach / Halfway Reach	̶	̶	̶
Crayfordness Point Light	Lighthouse	Flashing white 5s + fixed	51°28.689′N 0°13.000′E	Erith Rands / Long Reach	̶	̶	̶
Stone Ness Light	̶	̶	̶	Long Reach / St Clement's Reach	Lighthouse	Flashing green 2.5s	51°27.9167′N 0°16.8231′E
Broadness Point Light	Lighthouse	Occulting red 5s	51°27.878′N 0°18.900′E	St Clement's or Fiddler's Reach / Northfleet Hope	̶	̶	̶
Tilbury Warning Light	̶	̶	̶	Gravesend Reach	Warning light, vessels manoeuvring at Tilbury	Isophase 6s	51°27.000′N 0°21.340′E
Shornmead Light	Lighthouse	Group flashing (2) white, red 10s	51°26.983′N 0°26.533′E	Gravesend Reach / The Lower Hope	̶	̶	
Ovens	̶	̶	̶	The Lower Hope	Quick flashing green		51°27.493′N 0°26.355′E
Haven Traffic Warning Lights	Warning light, vessels manoeuvring at Coryton	E	51°27.90′N 0°30.10′E	The Lower Hope / Sea Reach	Warning light, vessels manoeuvring at Coryton	White	51°30.50′N 0°31.65′E
London Gateway	̶	̶	̶	Sea Reach	Buoy		51°30.30′N 0°28.20′E
Sea Reach № 7	Port buoy Racon T	Flashing Red 2.5s	51°30.011′N 0°36.908′E	The Yantlet Channel	Yellow pillar buoy	Flashing yellow 2.5s	51°30.206′N 0°36.938′E
Sea Reach № 6	Port buoy	Flashing red 5s	51°29.932′N 0°39.839′E	The Yantlet Channel	Starboard buoy	Flashing green 5s	51°30.126′N 0°39.867′E
Sea Reach № 5	Port buoy	Very quick flashing red	51°29.848′N 0°41.426′E	The Yantlet Channel	Starboard buoy	Very quick flashing Green	51°30.041′N 0°41.473′E
Sea Reach № 4	Port buoy	Group flashing (2) red 5s	51°29.504′N 0°44.121′E	The Yantlet Channel	Starboard buoy	Group flashing (2) green 5s	51°29.694′N 0°44.193′E
Sea Reach № 3	Port buoy	Quick flashing red	51°29.221′N 0°46.707′E	The Yantlet Channel	Starboard buoy	Quick flashing green	51°29.410′N 0°47.061′E
Sea Reach № 2	Port buoy	Flashing red 5s	51°29.296′N 0°49.754′E	The Yantlet Channel	Starboard buoy	Flashing green 5s	51°29.493′N 0°49.726′E
Sea Reach № 1	Port buoy	Flashing red 2.5s	51°29.368′N 0°52.445′E	The Yantlet Channel	Yellow pillar buoy Racon T	Flashing yellow 2.5s	51°29.586′N 0°52.710′E
West Oaze	̶	̶	̶	The Oaze Deep	Red & white buoy	Isophase 5s	51°28.975′N 0°55.413′E
Oaze Bank	̶	̶	̶	The Oaze Deep	Starboard buoy	Quick flashing green	
Oaze	Yellow pillar buoy	Group flashing (4) Yellow 10s	51°28.977′N 0°56.917′E	The Oaze Deep	̶	̶	̶
Argus	̶	̶	̶	The Oaze Deep	Yellow pillar buoy yellow ‘X’ topmark	Flashing yellow 2.5s	51°29.297′N 0°58.715′E
Oaze Deep	̶	̶	̶	The Oaze Deep	Starboard buoy	Group flashing (2) green 5s	51°30.000′N 1°0.000′E
Knob	Red & white buoy	Isophase 5s		The Oaze Deep	̶	̶	̶
SE Mouse	̶	̶	̶	The Oaze Deep	Starboard buoy	Quick flashing green	
Knock John № 7	̶	̶	̶	The Knock John Channel	Starboard buoy	Group flashing (4) green 15s	51°31.956′N 1°06.406′E
Knock John № 5	̶	̶	̶	The Knock John Channel	Starboard buoy	Group flashing (3) green 10s	51°32.490′N 1°07.750′E
Knock John № 4	Port buoy	Group flashing (3) red 10s	51°32.323′N 1°07.906′E	The Knock John Channel	̶	̶	̶
Knock John № 3	̶	̶	̶	The Knock John Channel	Starboard buoy	Flashing green 5s	51°33.278′N 1°09.692′E
Knock John № 2	Port buoy	Flashing red 5s	51°33.112′N 1°09.847′E	The Knock John Channel	̶	̶	̶
Knock John № 1	̶	̶	̶	The Knock John Channel	South cardinal buoy	Quick flashing white (6) + long flash 15s	51°33.717′N 1°10.833′E
Knock John	Port buoy	Group flashing (2) red 5s	51°33.661′N 1°11.357′E	The Knock John Channel	̶	̶	̶
Black Deep № 12	Port buoy	Group flashing (4) red 15s	51°33.661′N 1°13.511′E	The Black Deep Channel	̶	̶	̶
Black Deep № 11	̶	̶	̶	The Black Deep Channel	Starboard buoy	Group flashing (3) green 10s	51°34.250′N 1°13.475′E
Black Deep № 10	Port buoy	Group flashing (3) red 10s		The Black Deep Channel	̶	̶	̶
Black Deep № 9	̶	̶	̶	The Black Deep Channel	South cardinal buoy	Quick flashing white (6) + long flash	
Inner Fisherman	Port buoy	Quick flashing red		The Black Deep Channel	̶	̶	̶
Black Deep № 7	̶	̶	̶	The Black Deep Channel	Starboard buoy	Quick flashing green	
Black Deep № 8	̶	̶	̶	The Black Deep Channel	West cardinal buoy	Quick flashing white (9) 15s	
BDM2	Yellow pillar buoy (mid-channel)	Flashing yellow 2.5s	51°37.370′N 1°20.040′E	The Black Deep Channel	̶	̶	̶
Black Deep № 6	Port buoy	Flashing red 2.5s		The Black Deep Channel	̶	̶	̶
Black Deep № 5	̶	̶	̶	The Black Deep Channel	East cardinal buoy	Very quick flashing white (3) 5s	
Black Deep № 4	Port buoy	Group flashing (2) red 5s		The Black Deep Channel	̶	̶	̶
BDM1	Yellow pillar buoy (mid-channel) yellow ‘X’ topmark	Flashing yellow 2.5s	51°41.960′N 1°27.590′E	The Black Deep Channel	̶	̶	̶
Black Deep № 3	̶	̶	̶	The Black Deep Channel	Starboard buoy	Group flashing (3) green 15s	
Black Deep № 1	̶	̶	̶	The Black Deep Channel	Starboard buoy	Flashing green 5s	
Black Deep № 2	Port buoy	Group flashing (4) red 15s		The Black Deep Channel	̶	̶	̶
SHM	Yellow pillar buoy (mid-channel) yellow ‘X’ topmark Racon T	Flashing yellow 2.5s	51°46.050′N 1°31.540′E	The Black Deep Channel	̶	̶	̶
Sunk Head Tower	̶	̶	̶	The Black Deep Channel	North cardinal buoy	Quick flashing white	
Black Deep	Port buoy	Quick flashing red	51°48.10′N 1°36.60′E	The Black Deep Channel	̶	̶	̶
Trinity	South cardinal buoy	Quick flashing (6) + long flash 15s		The Black Deep Channel	̶	̶	̶
Dynamo	̶	̶	̶	The Black Deep Channel	Yellow pillar buoy yellow ‘X’ topmark	Flashing yellow 2.5s	51°50.060′N 1°33.880′E
Sunk Inner	̶	̶	̶	The Black Deep Channel	Light float	Isophase 3s	51°51.170′N 1°34.400′E
