= Stortorget, Karlskrona =

Largest square in Karlskrona

Coordinates: 56.1612°N 15.5868°E

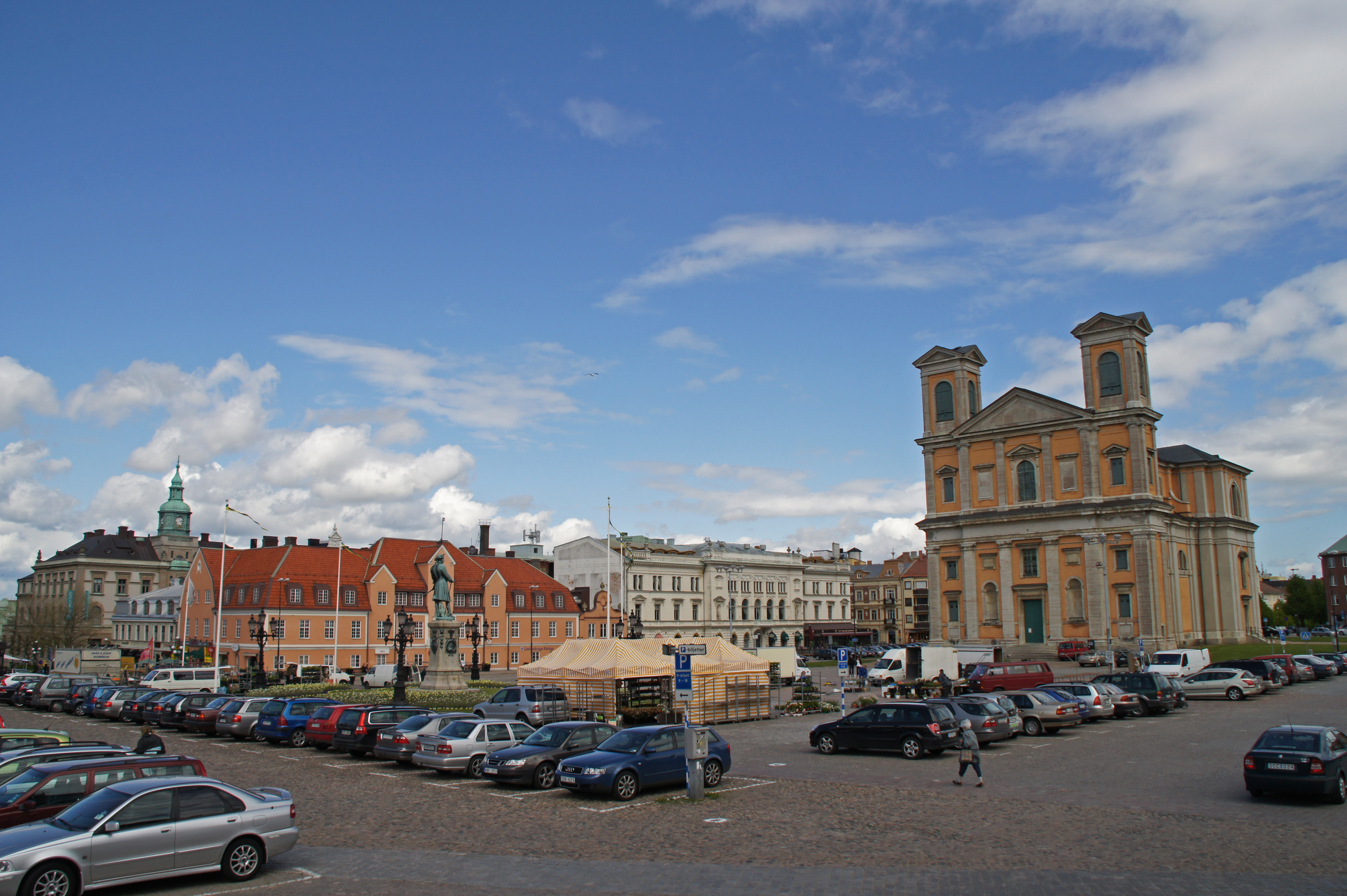
Stortorget before the prohibition of automobile parking, with the Fredrick Church to the right.

Stortorget (Swedish "Great Square") in Karlskrona is the largest square of the city. The square lies centrally on Trossö island. The square lies on the highest point of the island and is bounded by several monumental buildings. The Fredrik Church, the Church of the Holy Trinity, and the town hall are part of the World Heritage Site.

The square encompasses an area of about 200x100 square meters and is quadratic with the exception of its eastern side which has an extension where Kyrkogatan street connects. The full extent of the square cannot be viewed completely since the Fredrik Church lies in near the middle of the square, slightly to the west of the actual center where a statue of Charles XI stands. The visible area of the square is only about 140x100 square meters.

The large size of the square in relation to the surrounding city attests to the significance its planners placed on Karlskrona at its founding as Sweden's principal naval base in 1680.

== Klaipeda square ==
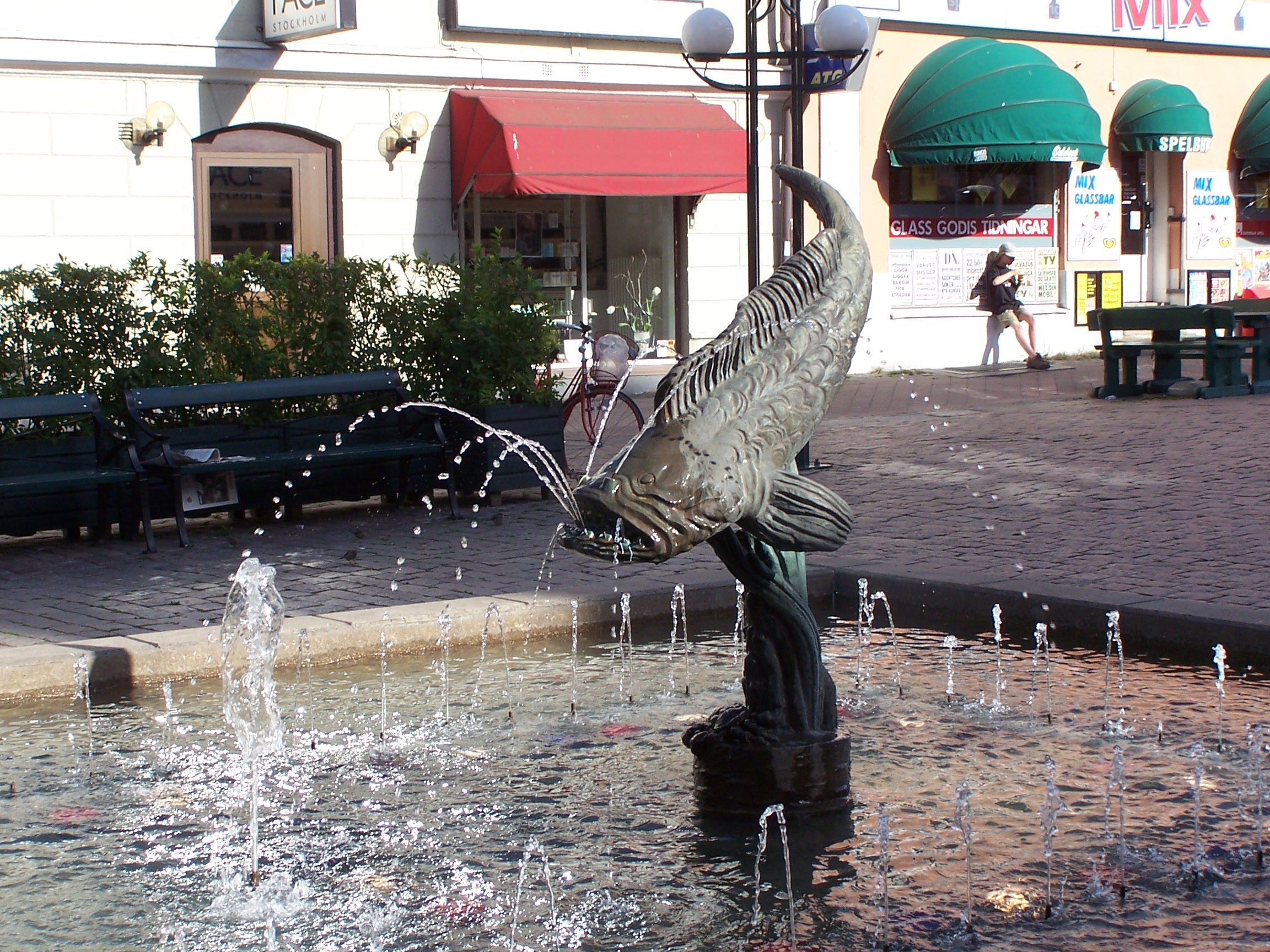
"Stora fisken" by Carl Milles.

Klaipeda square is located north of the square with the fountain "Stora fisken" (Swedish: "The Great Fish"). The square is popularly known simply as "the Fish". The shopping and pedestrian Ronnyebygatan street extends east and west. East of Klaipedaplatsen on the north west side of the square is Bankhuset and Hotell Statt.

== Fredrik Church ==
The Fredrik Church is in the middle of the square. The square actually extends around the church, although visually it appears as if the church is west of the square. The church, on which construction began September 9, 1720, is a typical baroque church designed by Nicodemus Tessin d.y. and replaced a prior provisional wooden church on Drottninggatan street, called Hedvig Eleonora Church. The church was not inaugurated until 1744.

In Sigtuna, in the southern tower of the church, there is a carillon with 35 bells that where installed in 1967 by Bergholtz clockworks. The carillon plays three times daily.

== Water fort ==
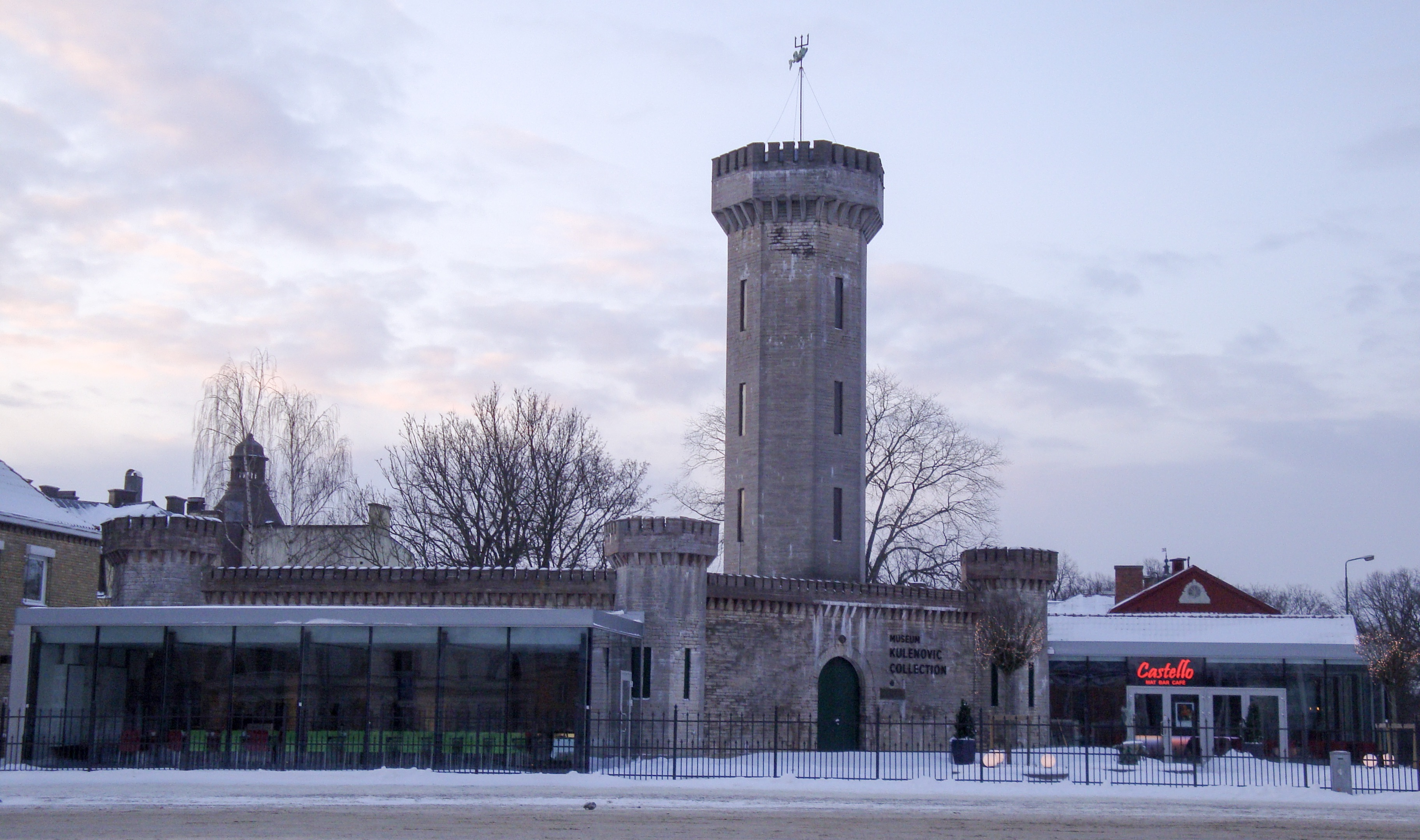
"Water fort"

The "Water fort" (Vattenborgen) lies south of Fredrick Church. It is a neoromantic building patterned after a redoubt in Norman style. It was built 1861 - 1863 as a water reservoir on Trossö in Karlskrona in connection with the construction of waterworks from the mainland. Today the building houses the restaurant 'Vattenborgen by Persson'.

== The Church of the Holy Trinity ==
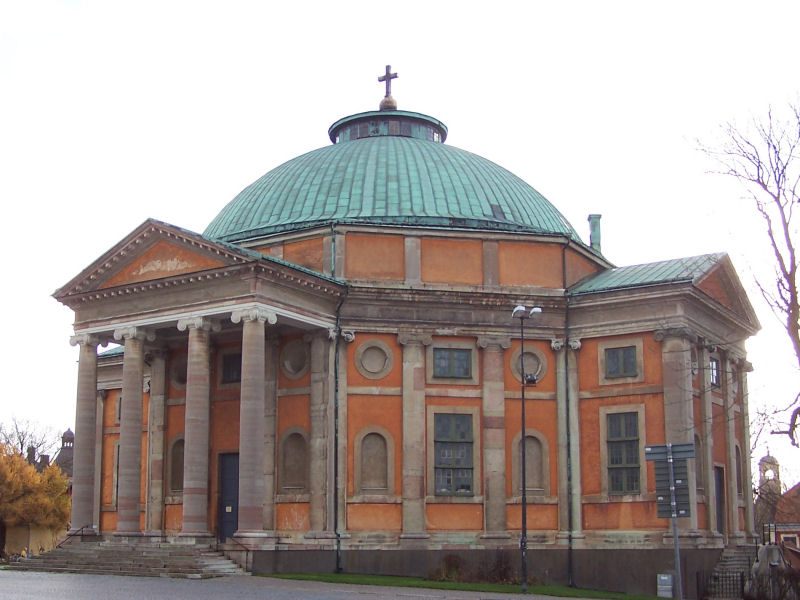
The Church of the Holy Trinity

The Church of the Holy Trinity lies southwest of the square. This church was also designed by Nicodemus Tessin the Younger. Its plan is octahedral with a domed roof. It presents a massive portico with four columns. The style, especially the dome, is clearly inspired by the Pantheon in Rome.

The church is also known as the German Church since it originally was the church of the German congregation. The congregation was formed in 1689 and existed until 1847 when it merged with Karlskrona city congregation.

Together with the Fredrick Church, the Church of the Holy Trinity are regarded as the foremost examples of classic Roman Baroque in Sweden.

== Old City Hall ==
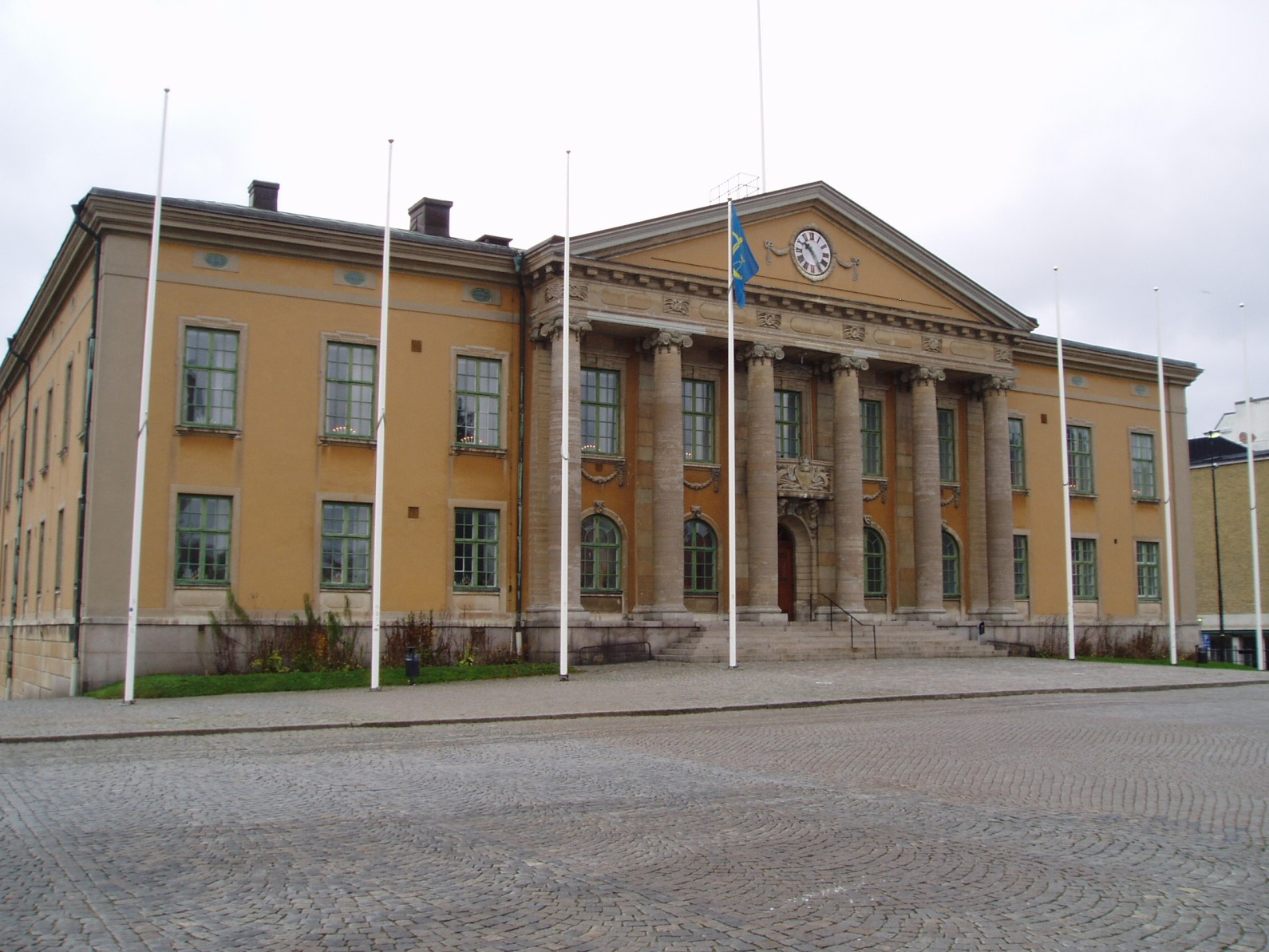
City hall

The city library lies to the south west of the square. To the west lies the old city hall of Karlskrona, completed in 1798. Today the building houses the Blekinge County court.
