= Trossö =

Island in Sweden

Coordinates: 56.15°N 15.5833°E

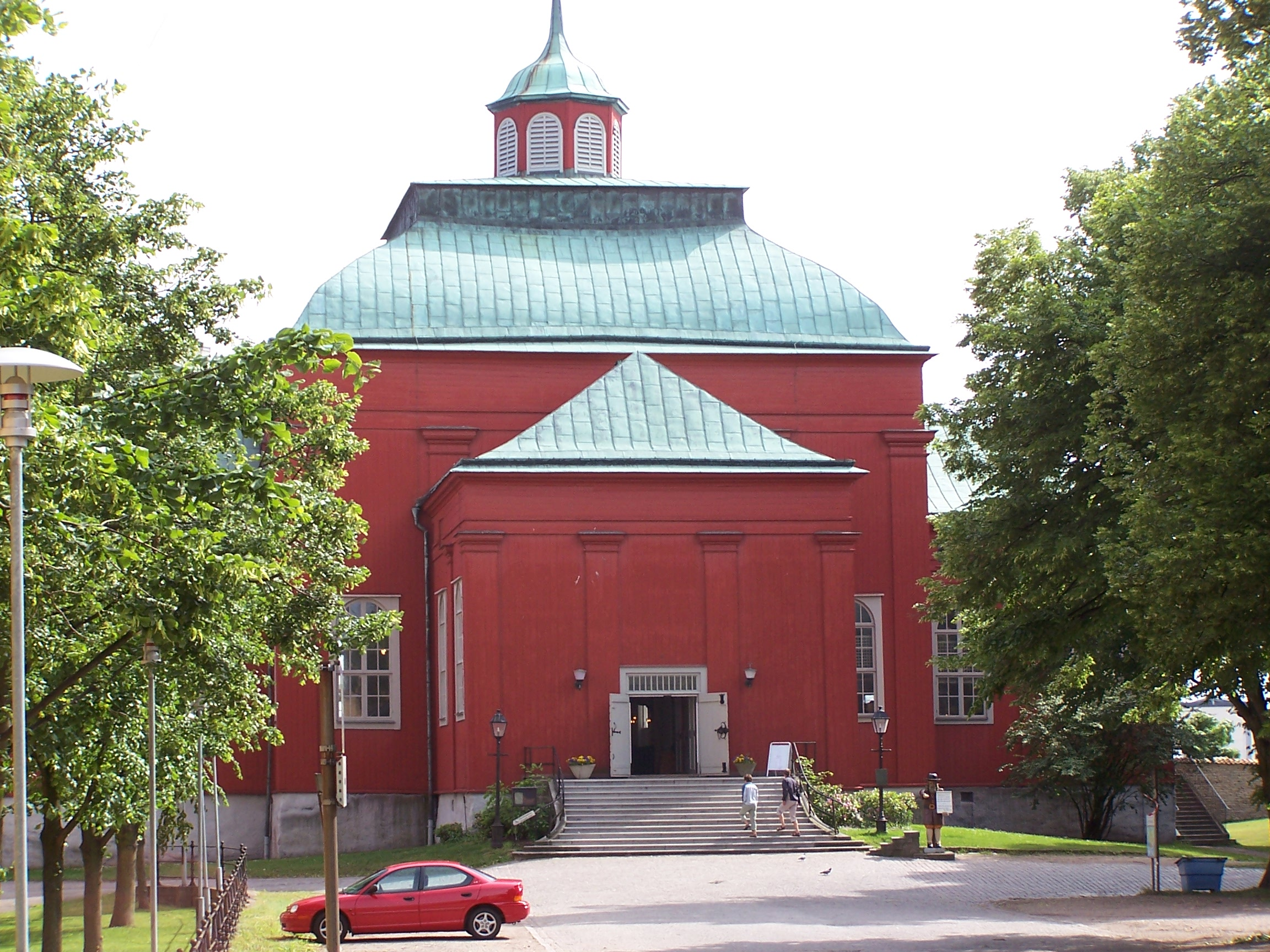
The Karlskrona Admiralty Church (Amiralitetskyrkan) is located on the island of Trossö.

Trossö is an island in Blekinge County, southern Sweden. It is situated within the Karlskrona archipelago. The main road, Osterleden (E22), connects the island to the mainland. The city of Karlskrona is spread over 30 islands, the main one being Trossö where the city center is located. Landmarks on Trossö include the Karlskrona Naval Base and Stortorget, the large town square situated in the centre of the island at its highest point. The two churches in the square, Trinity Church and Fredrik Church, were both designed by Nicodemus Tessin the Younger, with features such as burnt orange stucco and colonnades made of grey stone. Trossö is included in Karlskrona's distinction as a UNESCO World Heritage Site.
