= Pauper statues =

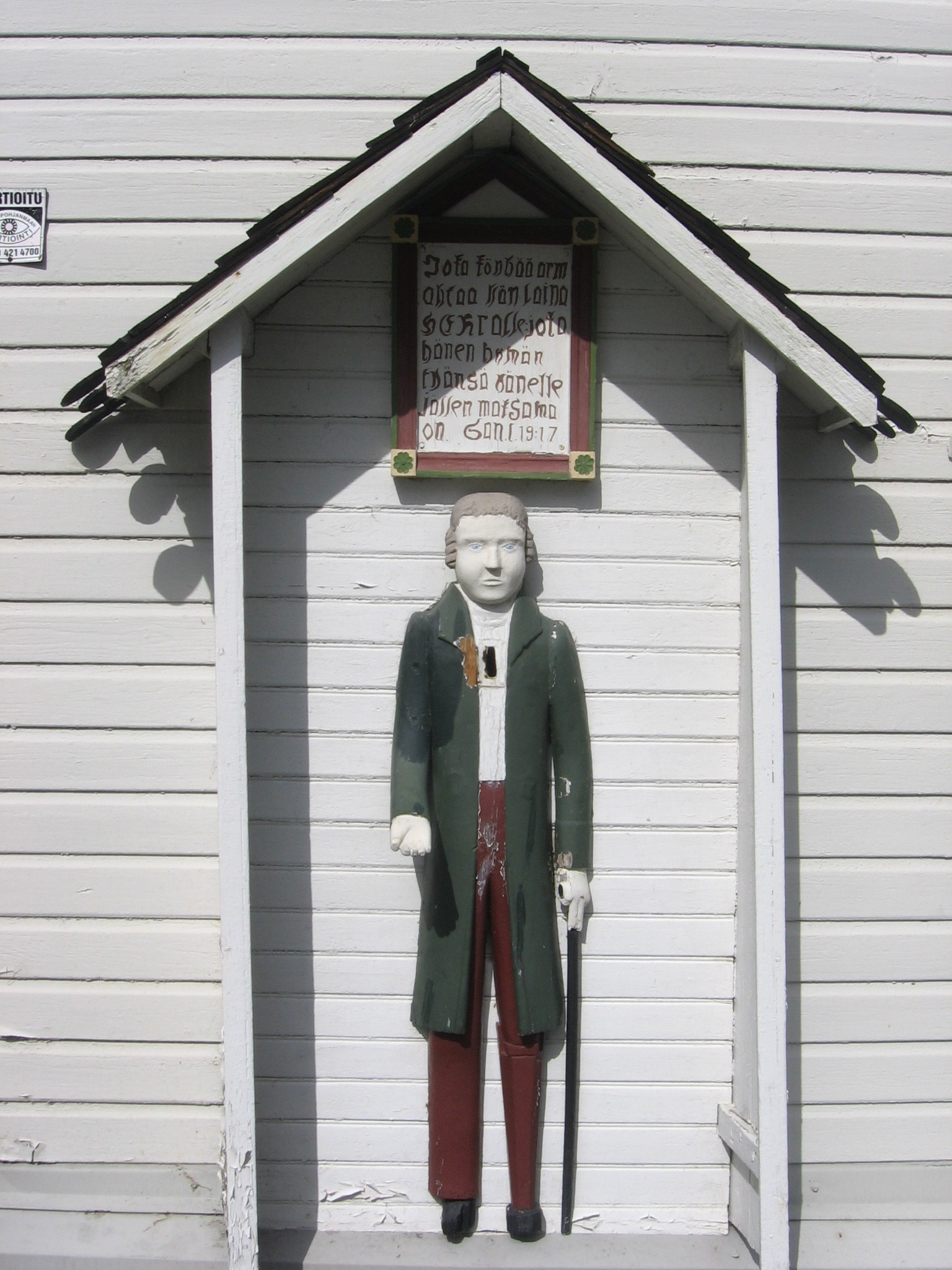
Poor man statue of Nurmo church with a pegleg.

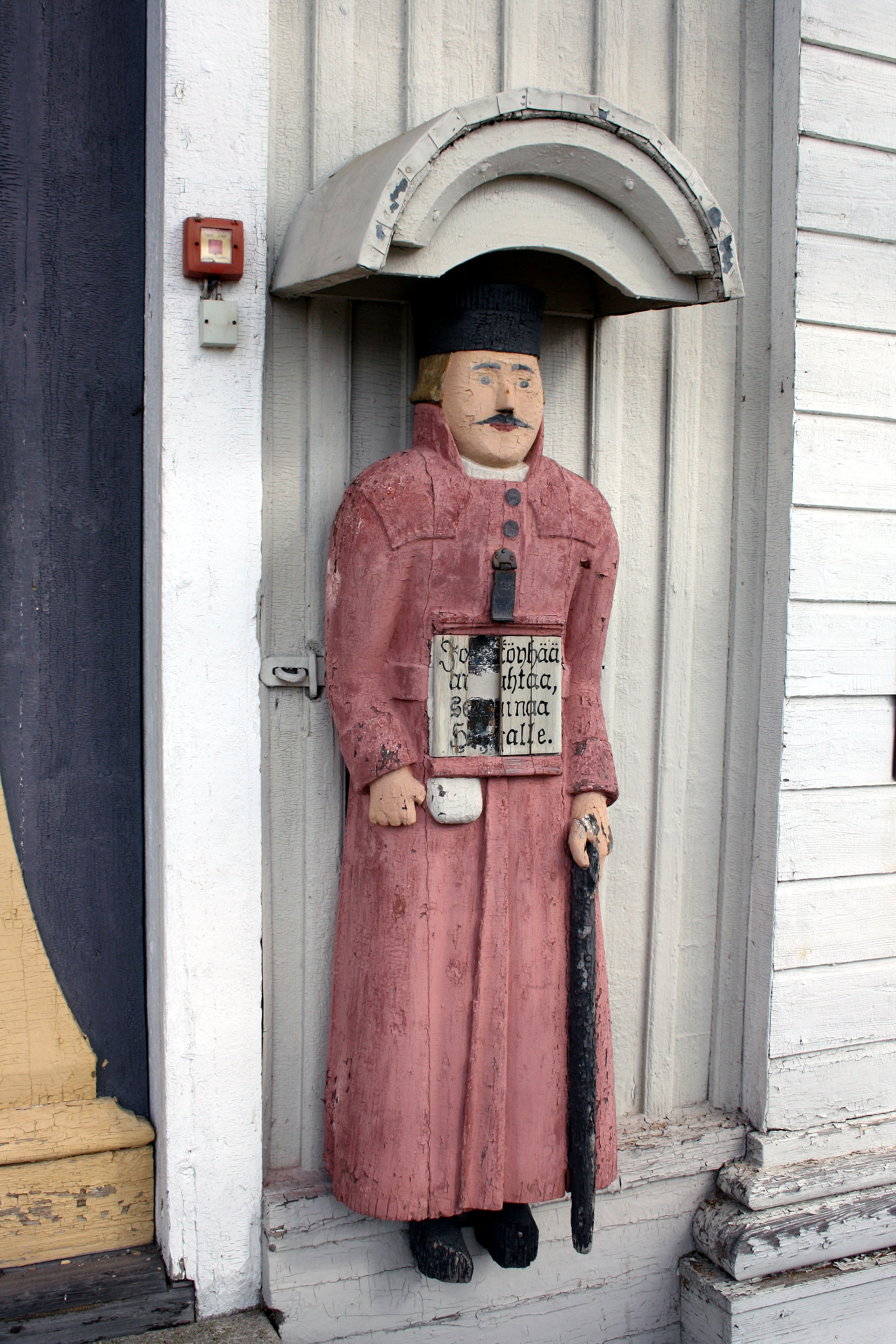
Poor man statue of Kälviä church with a pegleg.

Pauper statues (Finnish: vaivaisukko, Swedish: fattiggubbe) are alms boxes in the form of carved wooden statues on the outside walls of Lutheran churches in Finland and in Sweden. The statues represent poor and often disabled men or veterans begging for alms. The figures usually have a small metal box inside and a slot in the chest for inserting coins. They were used from the 17th to 19th century for collecting money for the poor.

== History ==
The origin of poor man statues dates back to 1649 when Queen Christina gave an order to place so called "poor logs" or "offertory logs" to churches and other public places. Soon the local carpenters started to modify these hollow wooden logs as beggar look-a-likes. Tallest of these sculptures are near man-sized. A Biblical sentence is often written above the statue.

Today there are 144 poor man statues and one poor woman statue in Finland, while Sweden has only nine known ones left. Most of the Finnish statues are found in the rural areas of Western Finland, especially in the Ostrobothnia region. A large number of sculptures have been destroyed by fire, they have been robbed or vandalized otherwise. The oldest known statues in Finland are the ones outside churches of Hauho and Raahe. They date from the late 17th century. Most of the poor man statues are from the early 19th century and many of them represent a retired soldier who's been disabled in the Finnish War.

== See also ==
- Rosenbom
