= Karlskrona Admiralty Church =

Coordinates: 56°09′25″N 15°35′28″E

- Karlskrona amiralitetskyrka
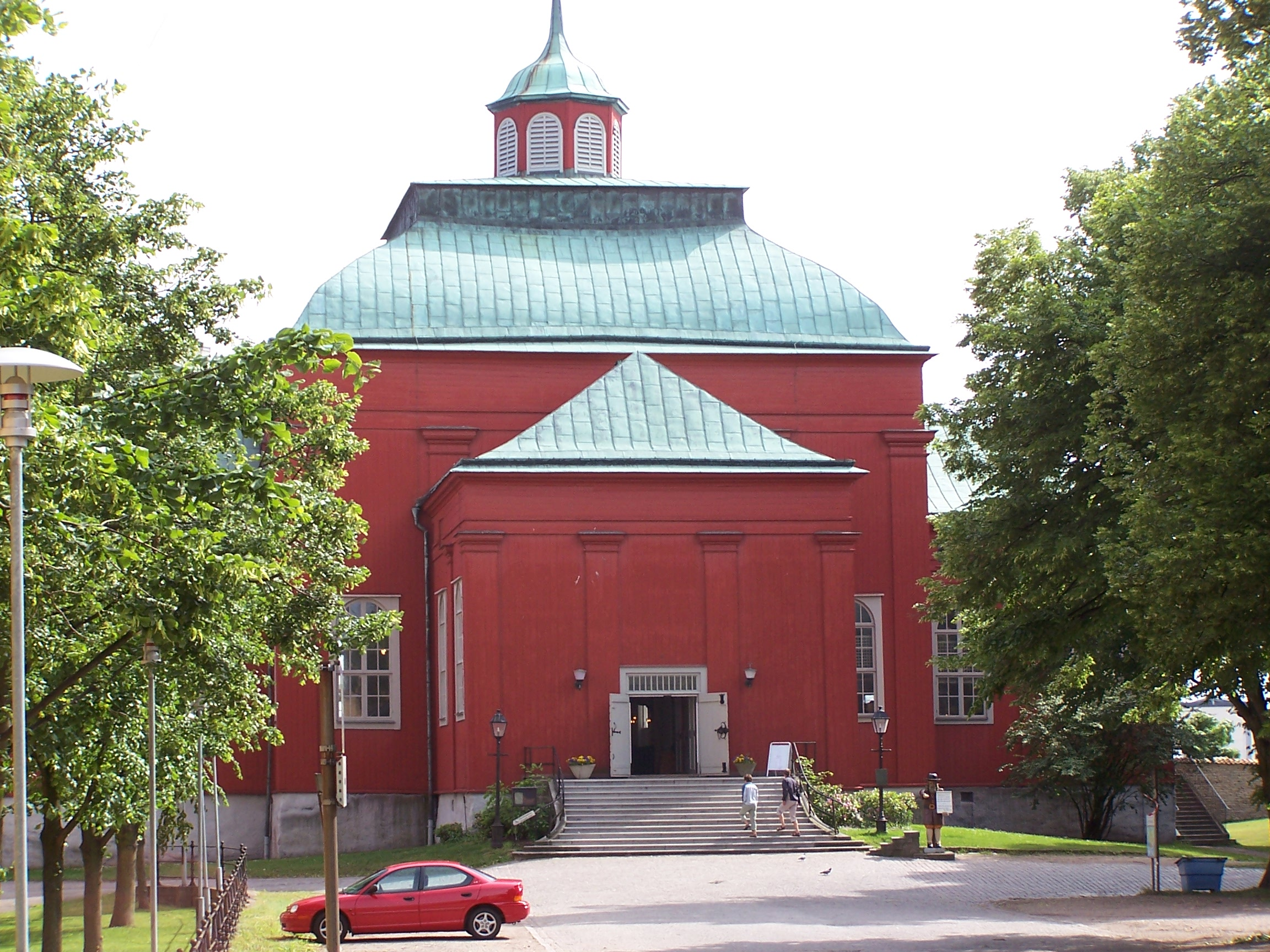
- Exterior, main entrance, with Rosenbom
- Karlskrona Admiralty Church
- Location: Karlskrona, Blekinge County
- Country: Sweden
- Denomination: Church of Sweden

History
- Consecrated: 20 September 1685

Specifications
- Materials: Wood

Administration
- Diocese: Lund
- Parish: Royal Karlskrona Admiralty Parish

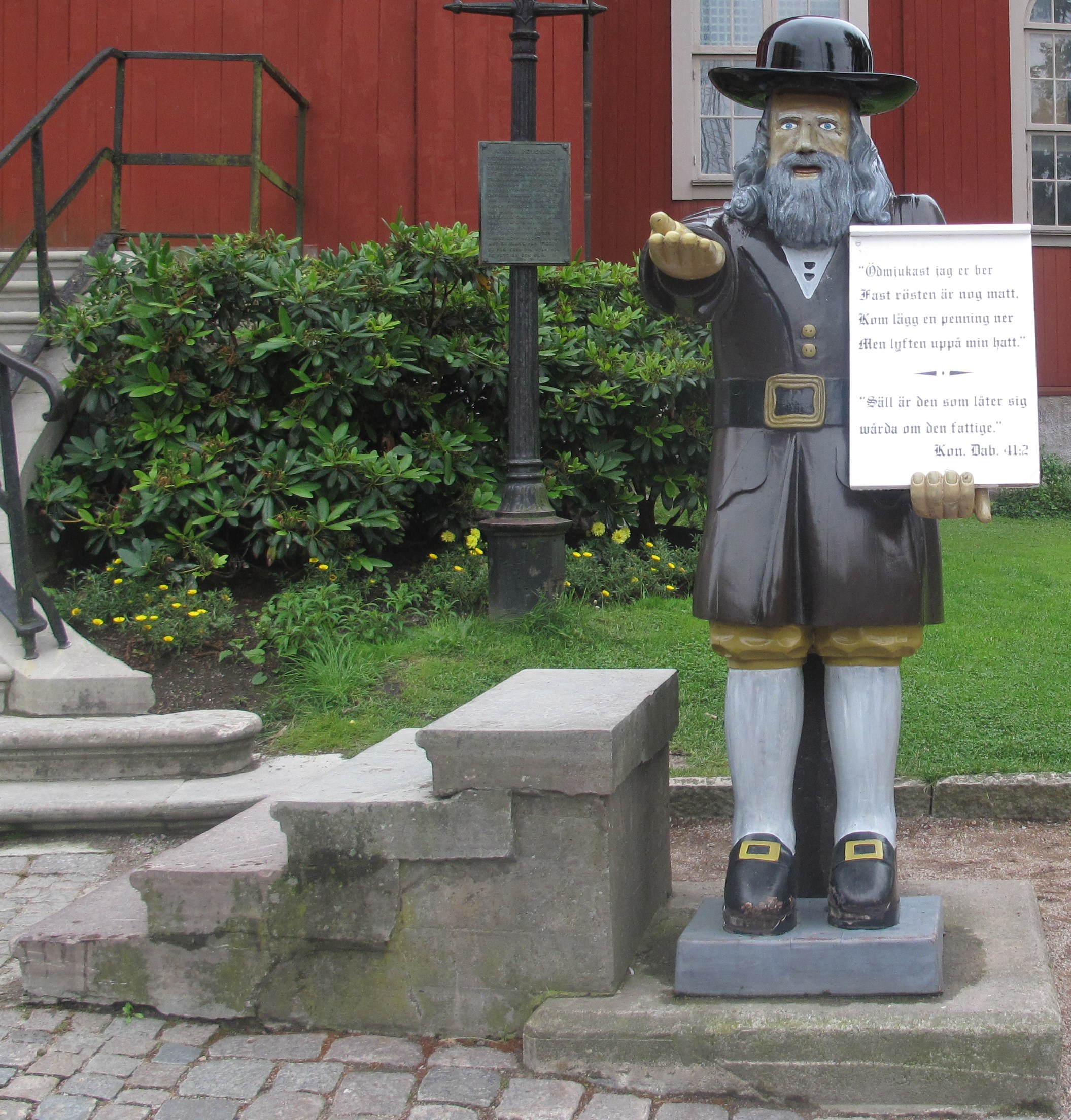
Rosenbom

The Karlskrona Admiralty Church (Swedish: Karlskrona amiralitetskyrka) is a church in Karlskrona, Sweden. The church is also known as the Ulrica Pia in honor of Queen Ulrike Eleonora of Denmark, Queen consort of King Charles XI of Sweden ('pia' is the feminine form of the Latin 'pius' which means 'pious').

== History ==
The church belongs to the Royal Karlskrona Admiralty Parish and is situated close to the Karlskrona Naval Base shipyard area. It is located near Vallgatan in the south east of the island of Trossö in the Karlskrona archipelago.

The church was consecrated in 1685. It is made entirely of wood. Originally it could seat 4,000 making it Sweden's largest wooden church The interior is in a light bluish color while the exterior is in the traditional Falu red. Its shape is a squarish greek cross, with each cross arm measuring 20 metres (66 ft). In front of the main entrance stands the wooden figure of Rosenbom.

The church was listed as part of the Karlskrona Naval Base on the UNESCO World Heritage List in 1998.

== Gallery ==
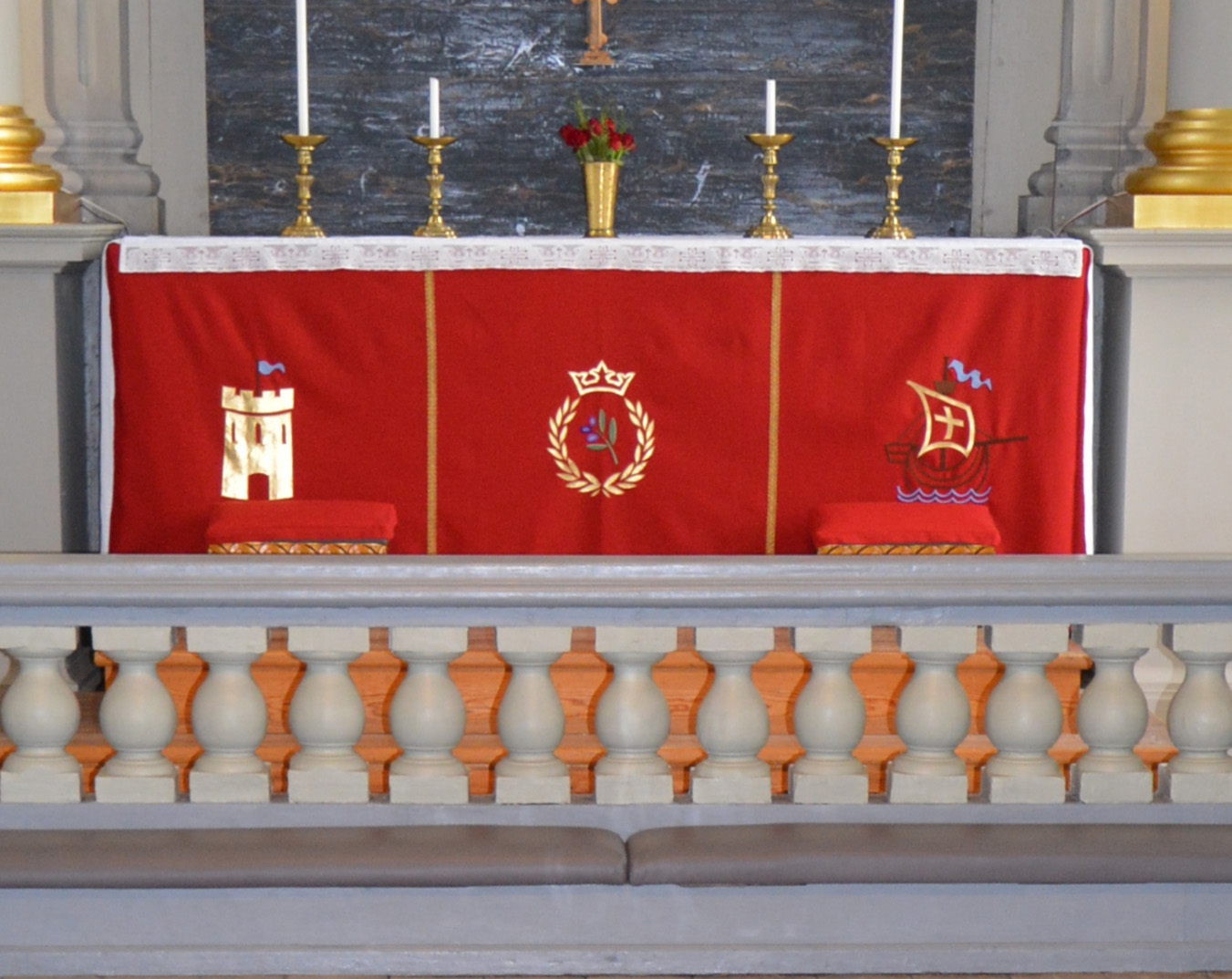
Altar

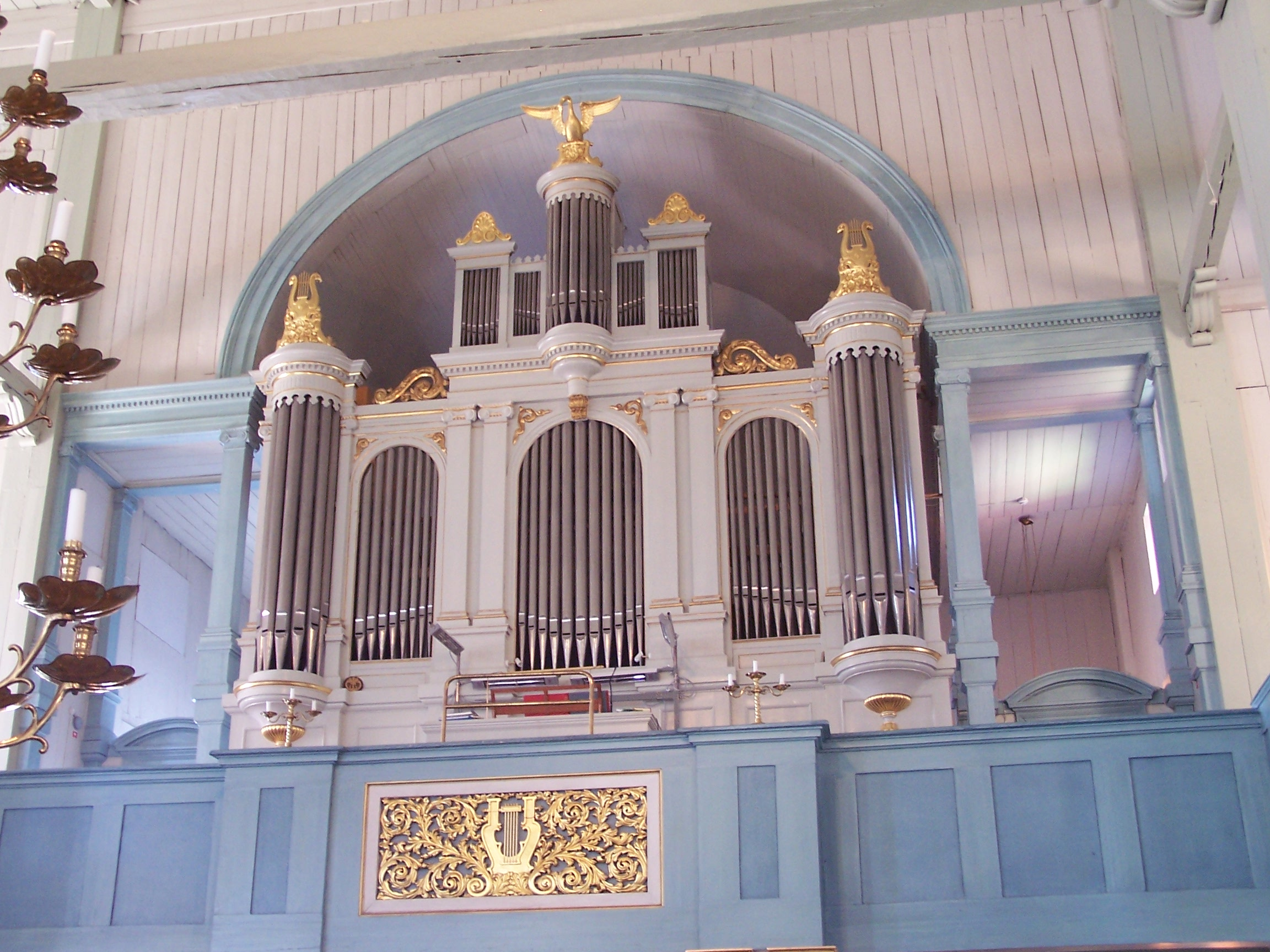
Organ

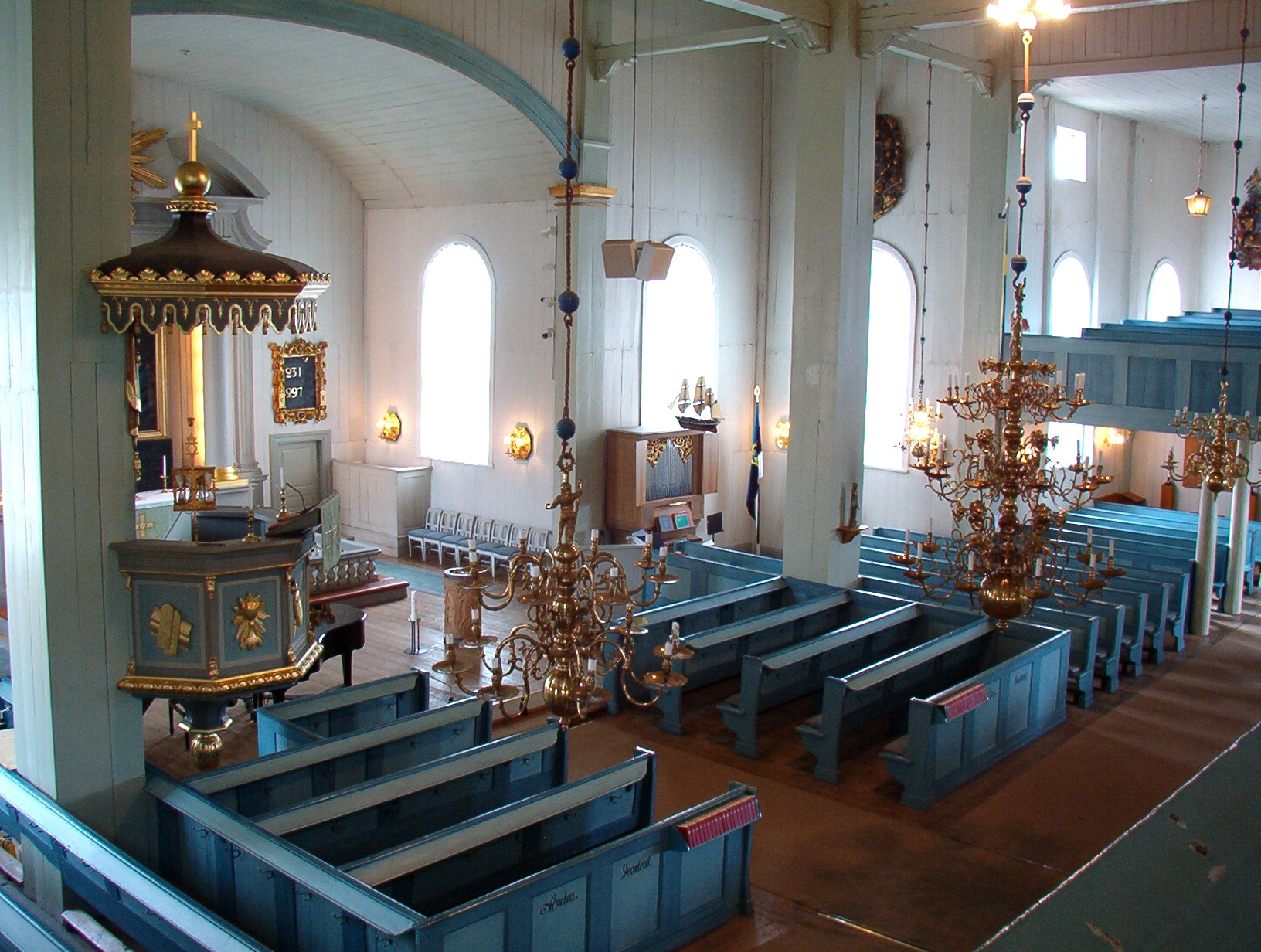
Interior

== See also ==
- Trinity Church (Karlskrona)
