= Royal Swedish Navy Band =

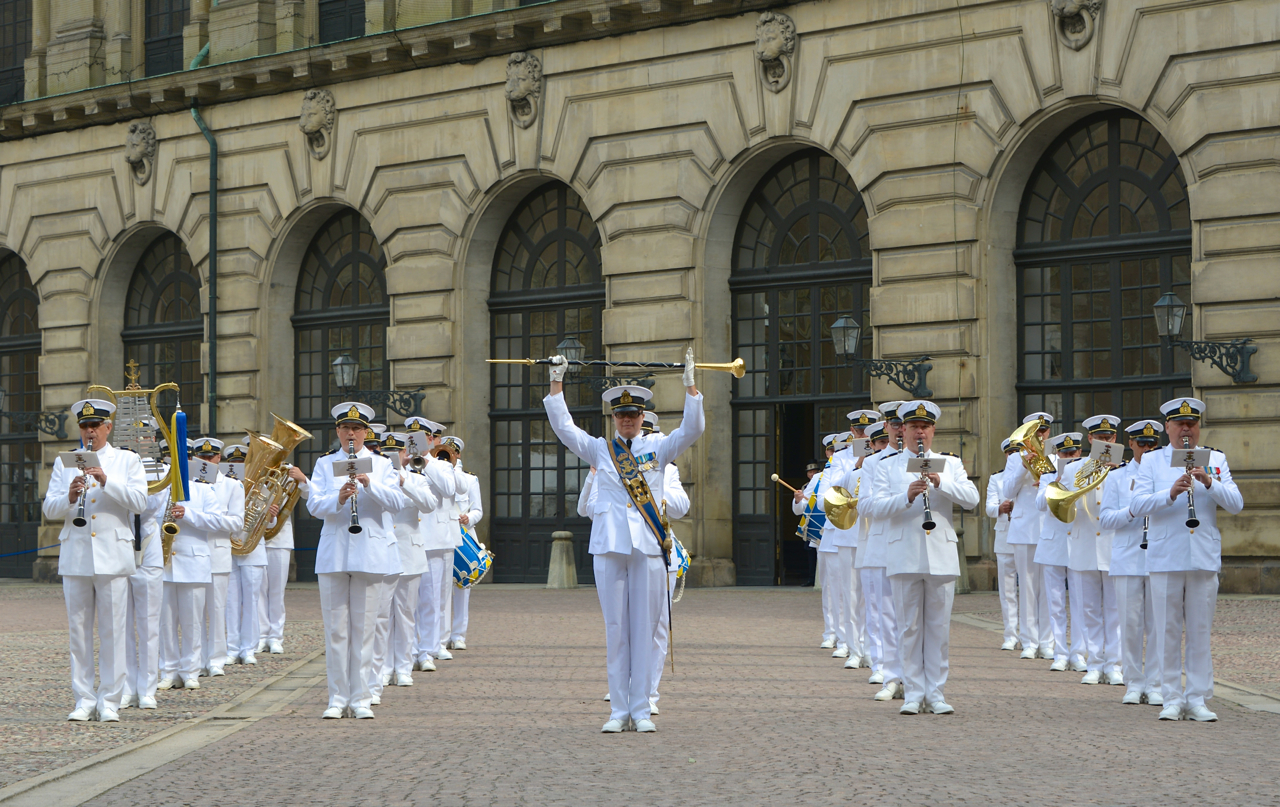

Royal Swedish Navy Band (Swedish: Marinens musikkår), is one of three professional military bands in the Swedish Armed Forces. The band is stationed at Karlskrona, was formed in 1680 and is mainly active in the south part of the country with concerts and regimental ceremonies but has also a major part in the state ceremonial, royal pageants and changing the King's guard at the Stockholm Palace in Stockholm. The Swedish Armed Forces Music Corps heads all bands in the Swedish Armed Forces.

== History ==
The earliest mentioning in writing of the band is at the inauguration of the Karlskrona Admiralty Church in 1685, whereas the musicians went about the town to give the word for the ceremony next Sunday. In 1780 the music at the naval base was formed as two bands of the Första och Andra volontärregementet eng. 1st and 2nd Naval Regiment. In 1804 the two bands were amalgamated into the band of the Naval Artillery Regiment (Sjöartilleriregementet) and later transferred to the Marine Regiment.

As the Marine Regiment was disbanded between 1871 and 1877 the music and leading musicians at the Karlskrona station was gradually transferred to the band of the Corps of Naval Volunteers which later was the basis for the band of the Royal Swedish Navy. Sergeant-Major August Fiedler late of the band of The Marine Regiment was the first Director of Music of the Royal Swedish Navy Band and his successor in 1873 was Frans Ferdinand Heimdal

In the Swedish navy all musicians had second tasks aboard and ashore and must therefore be considered part-time musicians. The band used brass instruments only with main task to provide men o’ war with buglers and ensembles. In 1915 Director of Music Heimdal was succeeded by Georg Ringvall which reorganized the band and introduced woodwind instruments.

== Directors of Music ==
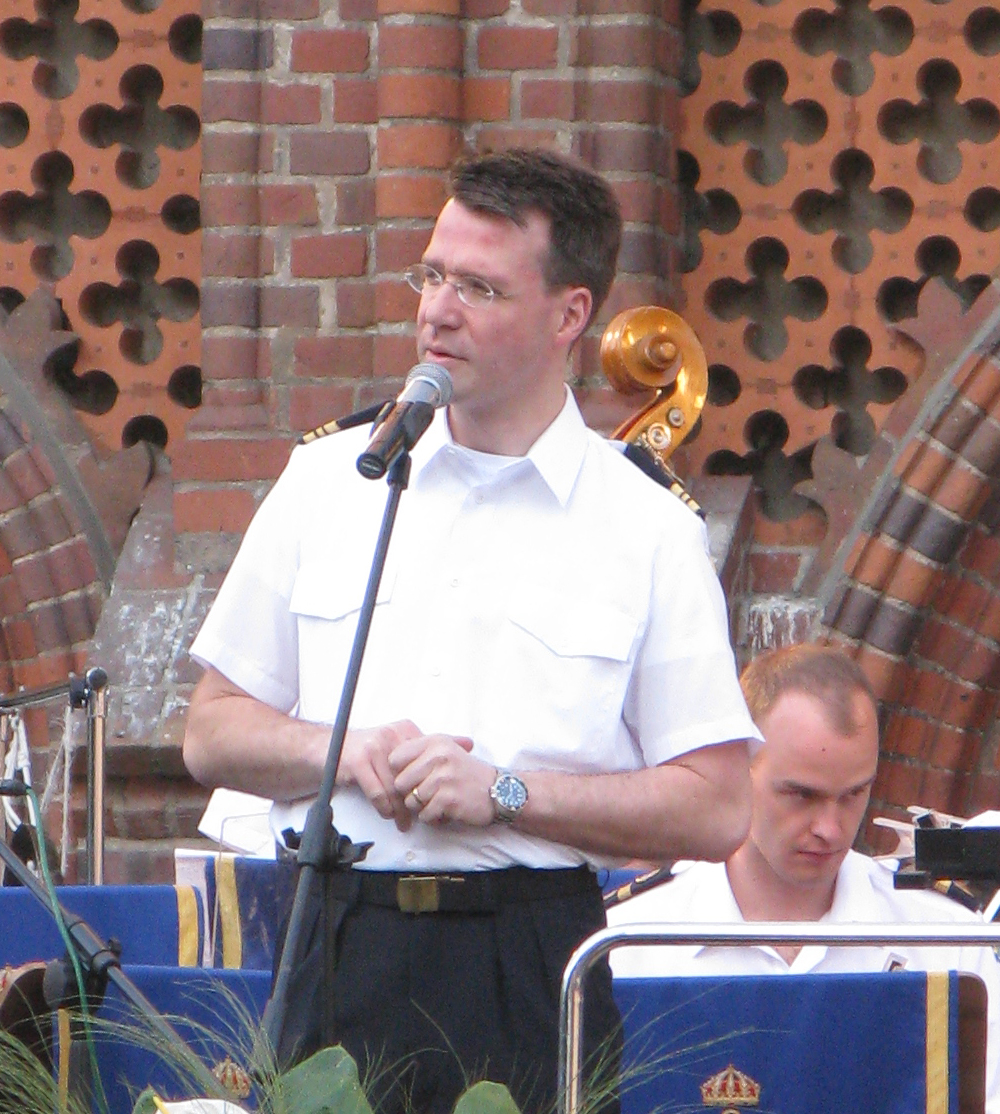
Andreas Hansson Director of Music 1998-2010

- August Friedrich Fiedler, 1862–1875
- Frans Ferdinand Heimdahl, 1875–1915
- Georg Ringvall, 1915–1935
- Harry Olsson, 1935–1944
- John Skoglöf, 1944–1957
- Sune Sundberg, 1957–1960
- Åke Dohlin, 1960–1973
- Per Ohlsson, 1973–1975
- Egon Kjerrman, 1975–1979
- Folke Nilsson, 1979–1988
- Folke Nilsson, 1988–1989
- Vacant, 1989–1993
- Per Ohlsson, 1993–1998
- Andreas Hanson, 1998–2010
- Vacant, 2010–2018
- Alexander Hanson, 2018-today

== Composition ==
The wind ensemble consists of: 2 flutes, 1 oboe, 1 bassoon, 7 clarinets, 2 saxophones, 3 French horns, 4 trumpets/cornets, 3 trombones, 1 euphonium, 2 tubas, a percussion section that includes 3 players, and 1 double bass (in concert formation).

== Gallery ==
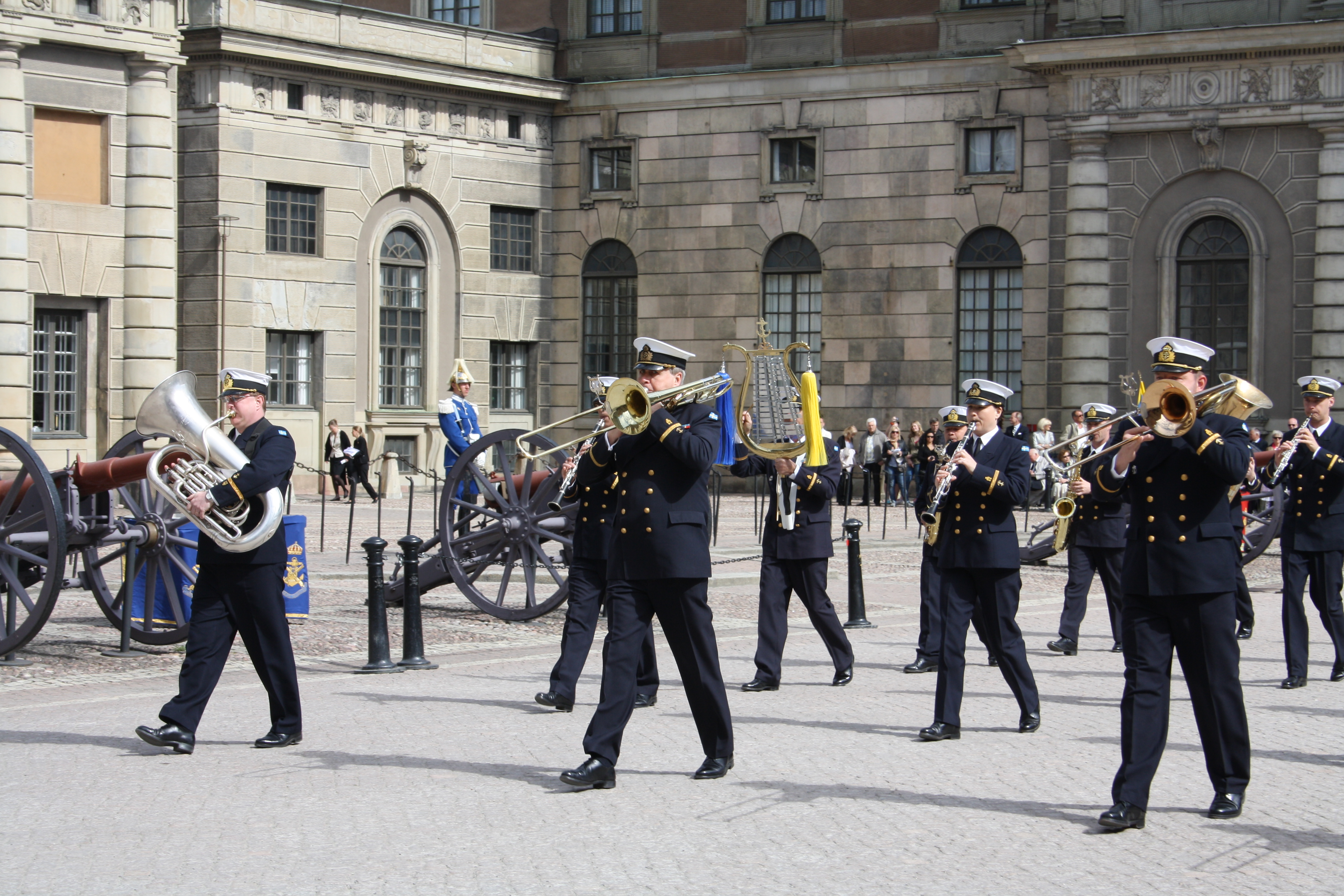
The band at H.M. birthday 2011.

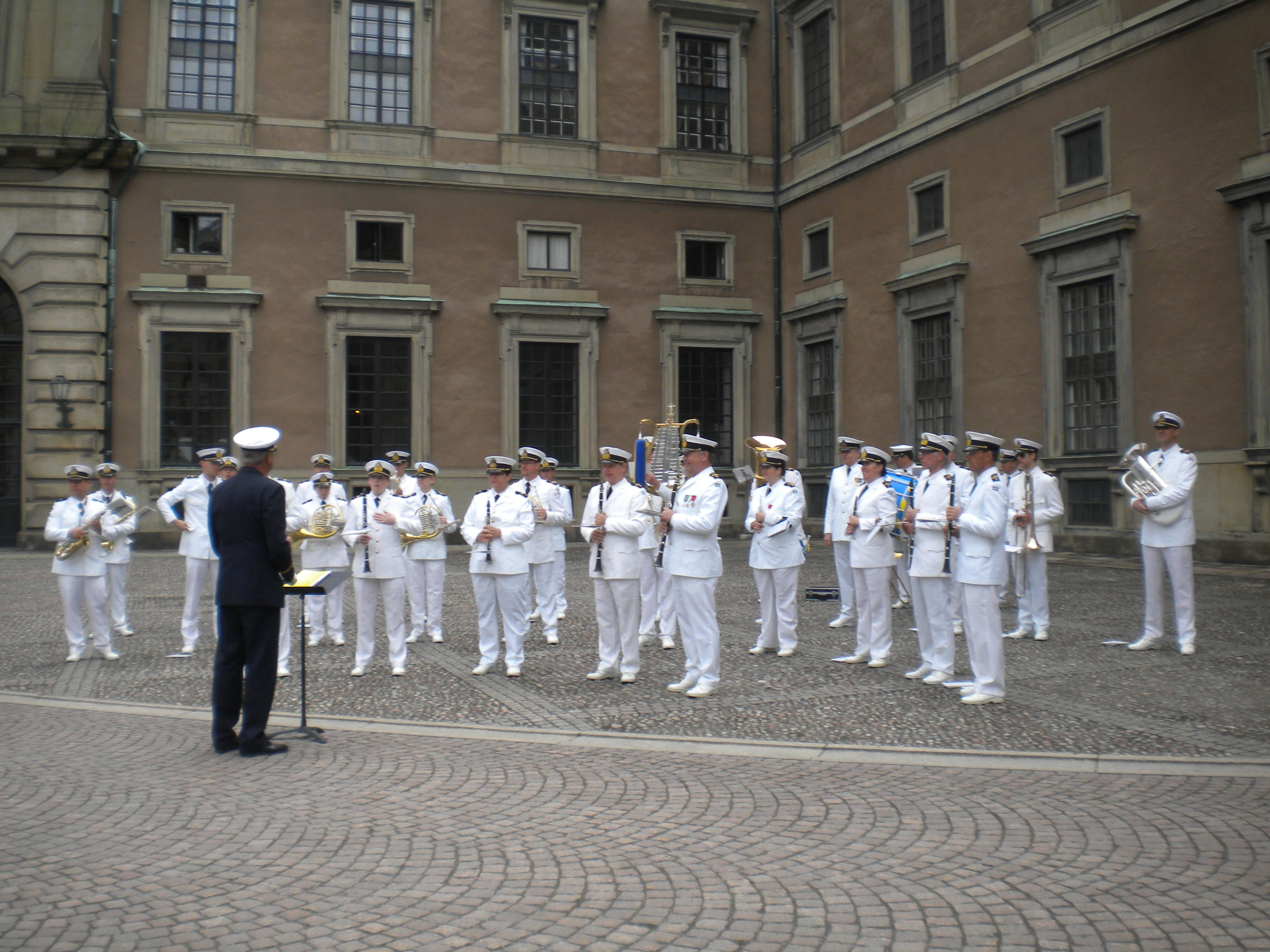
At the Royal Palace inner courtyard in 2012.

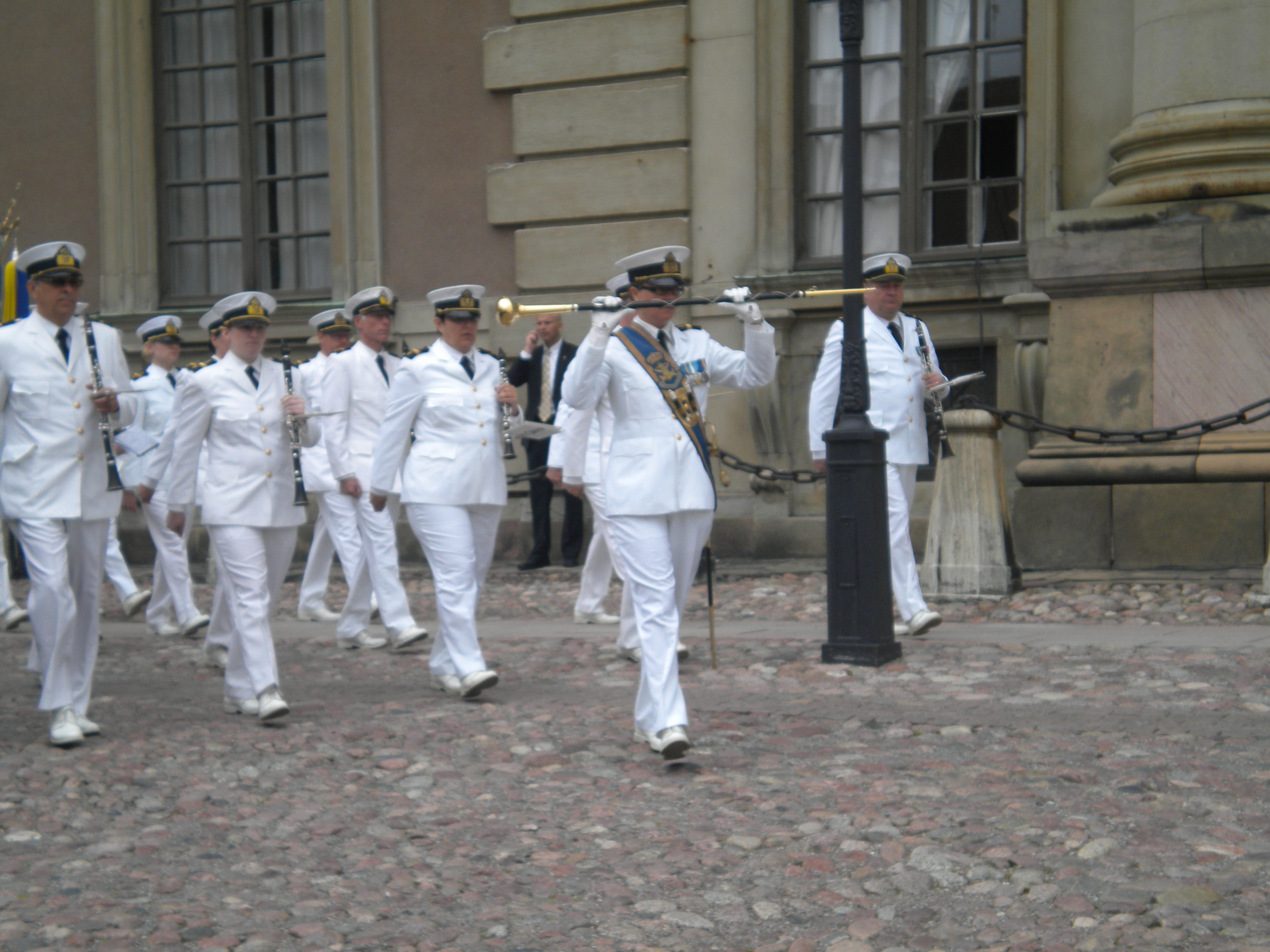
Changing the King's guard 2012.

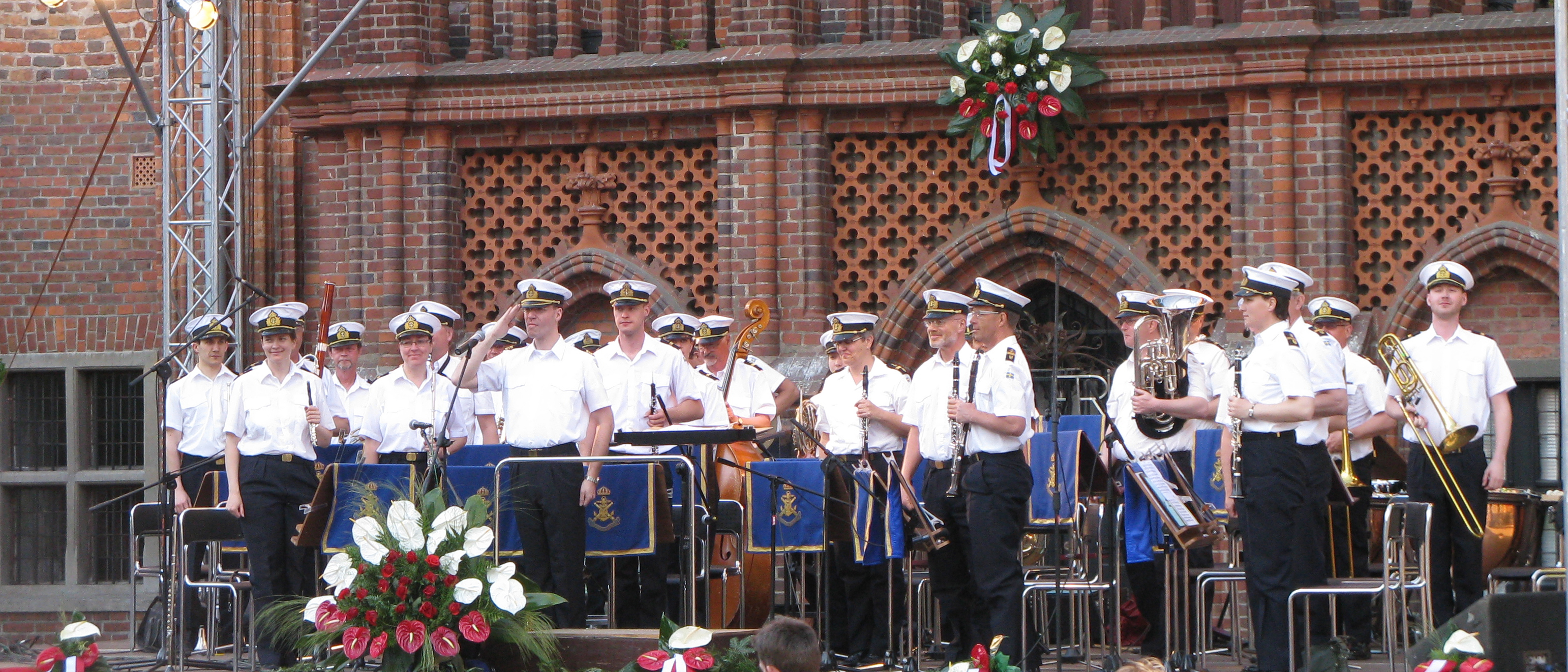
Visit to Toruń in Poland.

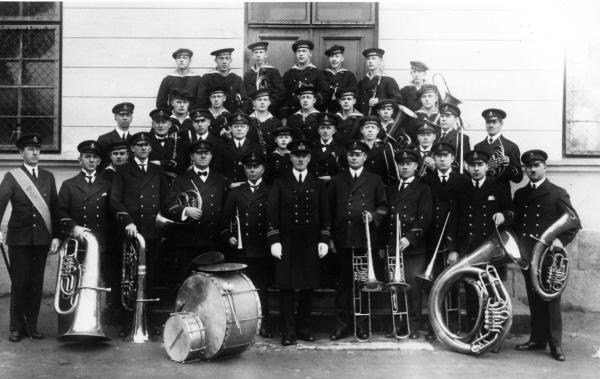
Royal Swedish Navy Band in Karlskrona in 1928. Director of Music Ringvall in the front row.

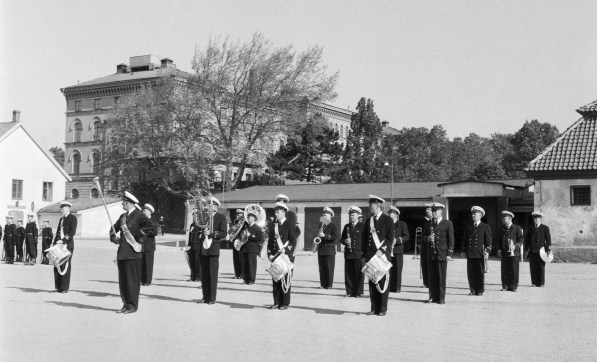
Royal Swedish Navy Band in 1958.

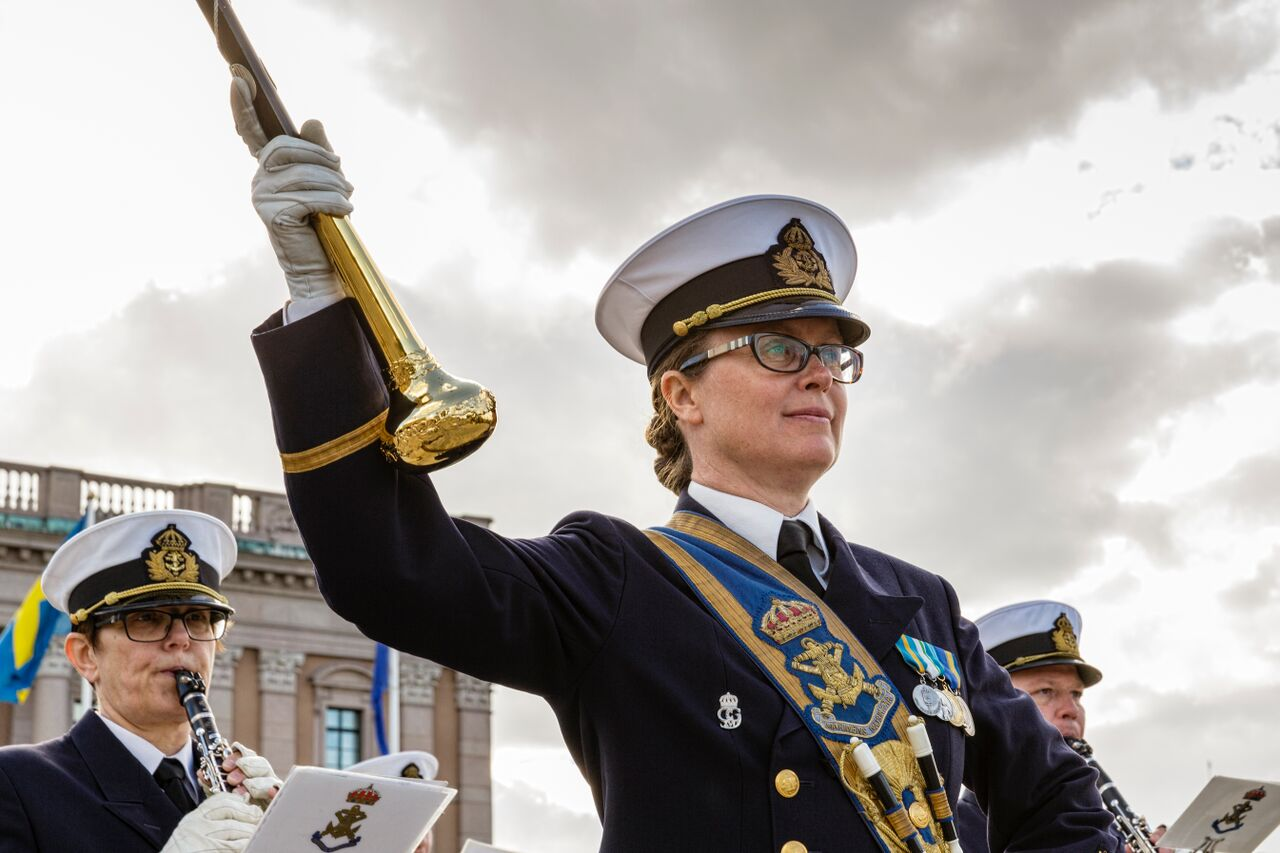
The drum-major.

== Sources ==
- Rostin, Per (1994): Flottans musikkår. Karlskrona: Abrahamsons Tryckeri AB ISBN 91-971152-6-6
