= Hedvig Eleonora Church (Karlskrona) =

Church in Karlskrona, Sweden

Coordinates: 56°9′49.5″N 15°35′31.6″E

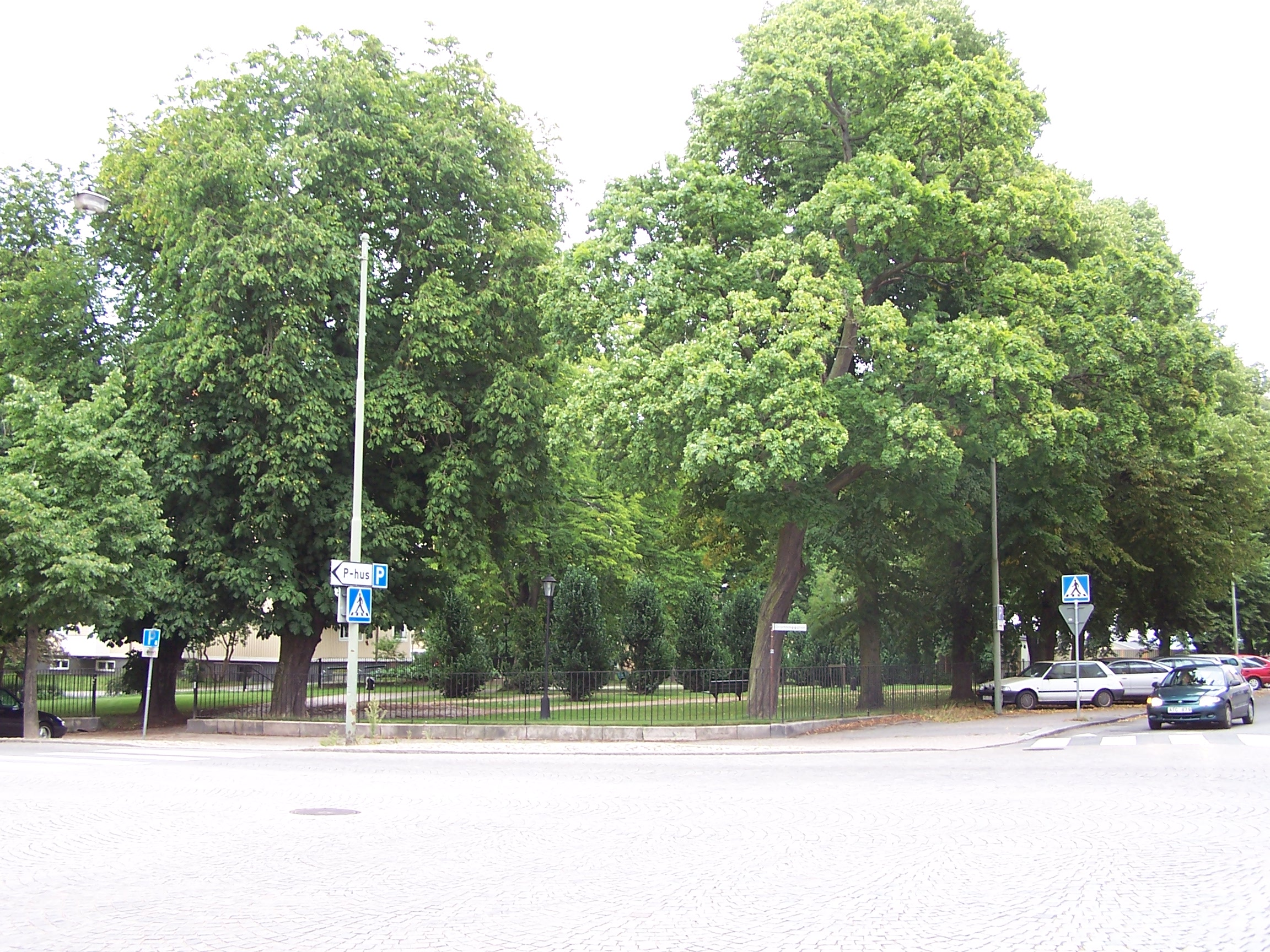
Kapellparken in Karlskrona

The Hedvig Eleonora Church was located in Karlskrona, Blekinge County, southern Sweden. It was situated at the corner of Drottninggatan/Östra Köpmangatan. Consecrated in 1685, it was the city's first parish church, and was built as a temporary wooden church in anticipation of a stone church which the king promised that the Crown would fund. The church was named after the then Queen Dowager Hedvig Eleonora of Holstein-Gottorp. It was in use from 1681 until 1744 when it was replaced by Fredrikskyrkan. The churchyard has been converted into a park.
