= Trinity Church (Karlskrona) =

Church in Blekinge, Sweden

Coordinates: 56°09′38″N 15°35′09″E

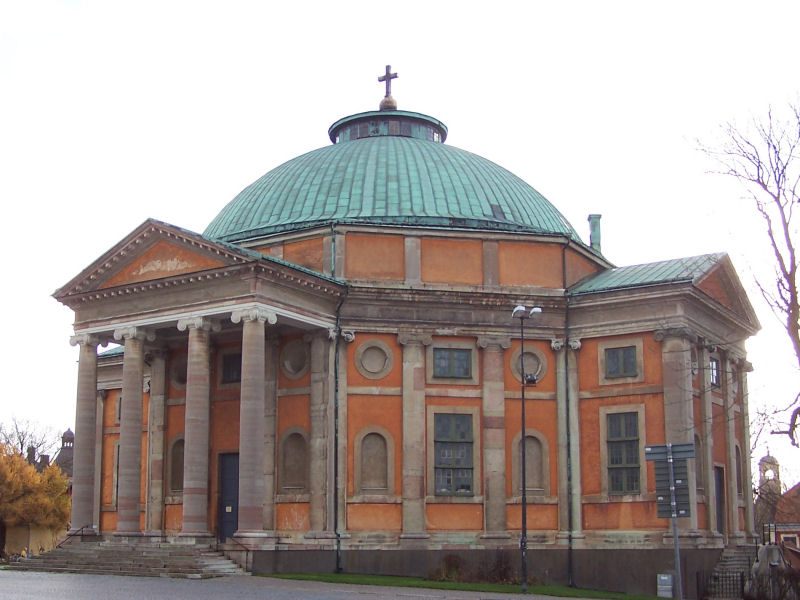
Trinity Church ( Trefaldighetskyrkan)

The Trinity Church (Swedish: Trefaldighetskyrkan, alternate, "German Church") is located at Karlskrona in Blekinge, Sweden. Along with the Fredrik Church (Fredrikskyrkan), the church is situated in the main square, (Stortorget), at the center of the island of Trossö.

The church was built in Baroque architecture for the town's German-speaking population. The first foundation stone was set in 1697. The church was inaugurated on June 27, 1709. The church was designed by architect Nicodemus Tessin the Younger 1654–1728). The structure includes a domed rotunda. At the time of the citywide fire in Karlskrona in 1790 the church burned and only the walls remained. The church was rebuilt after the original drawings.

After the fire in 1790, only the severely damaged outer walls remained. In 1791, architect Olof Tempelman (1745-1816) was commissioned to draw up proposals for the reconstruction of the church. His simplification of architectural details for the exterior of the church resulted in a building with Neoclassical architecture style. In 1802, the church was re-inauguration. In 1814, the church interior was completed. The principal responsible for this work was Admiralty sculptor Johan Törnström (1743-1828). Most notably he created both the altarpiece and pulpit for the Church.

The church was listed as part of the Naval Port of Karlskrona on the UNESCO World Heritage List in 1998.

== Gallery ==
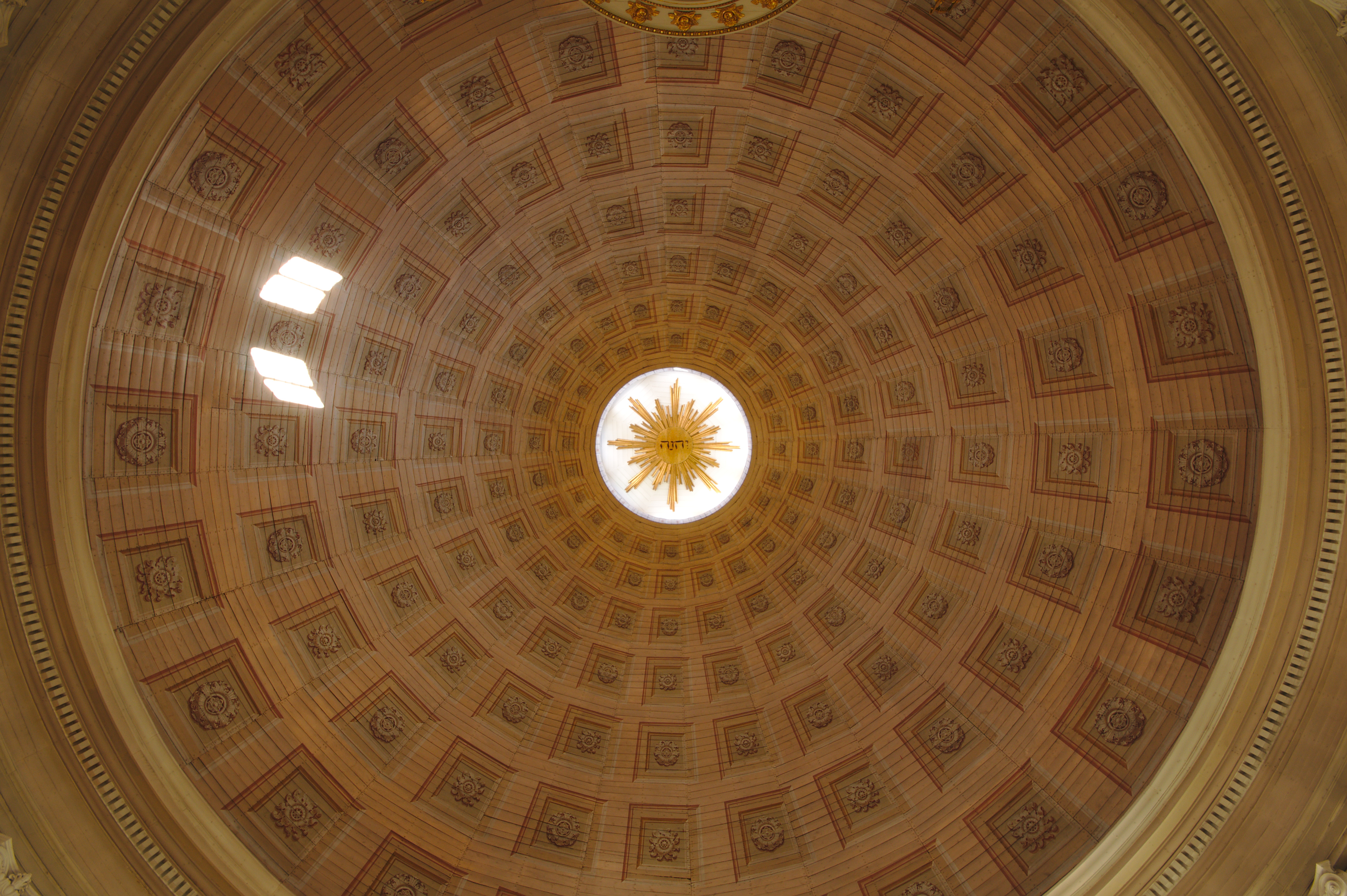
Rotunda

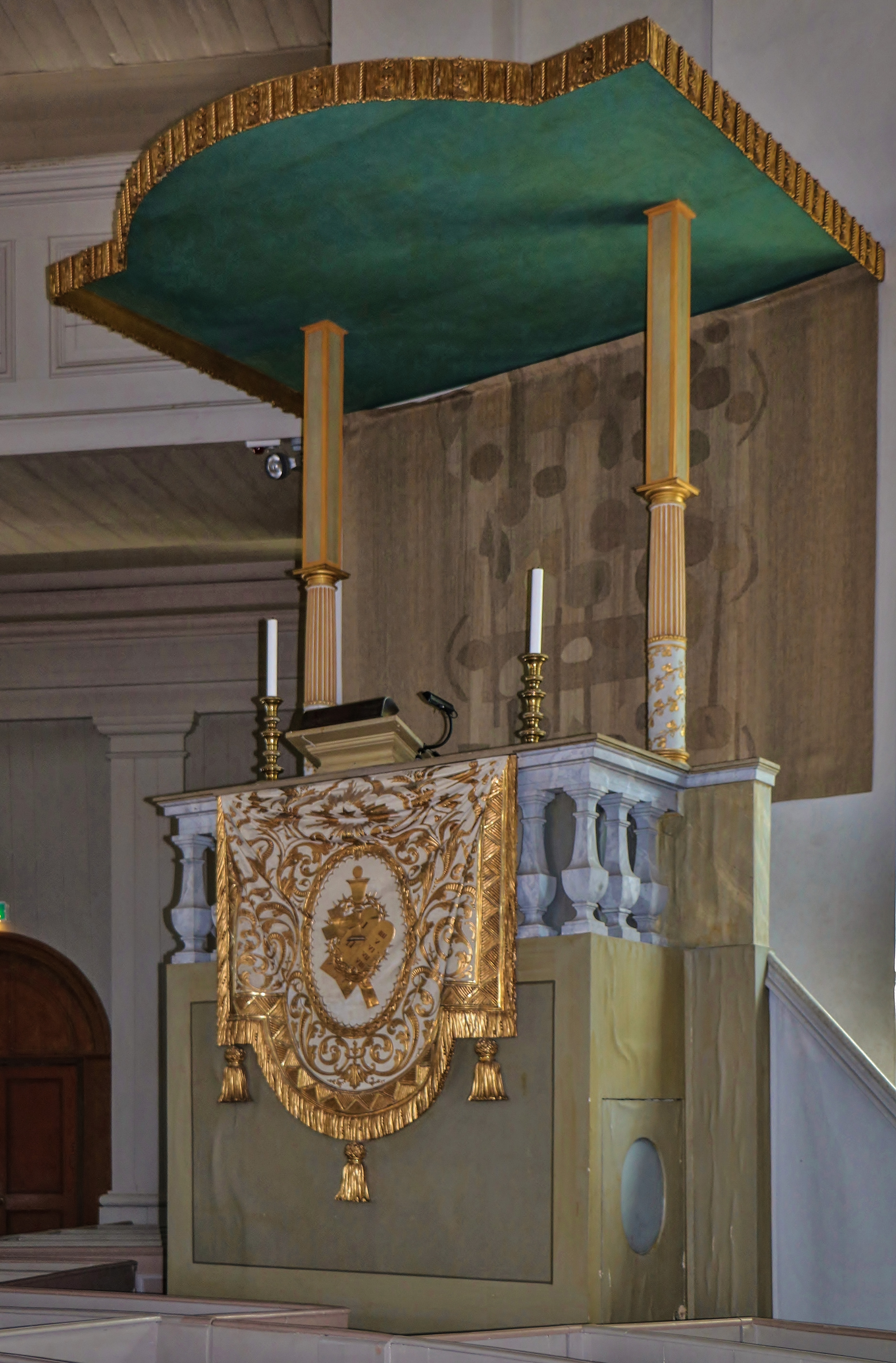
Pulpit

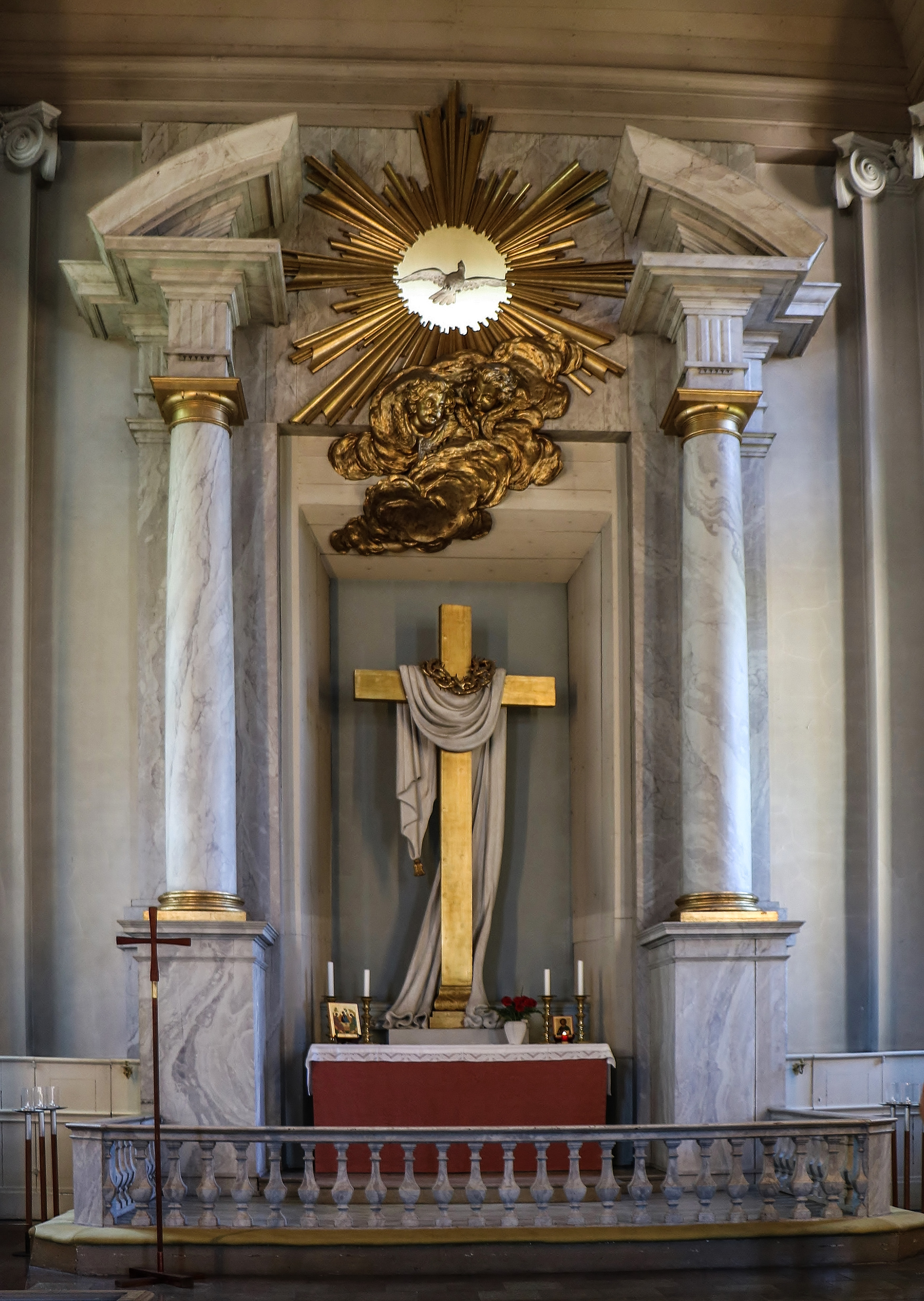
Altarpiece

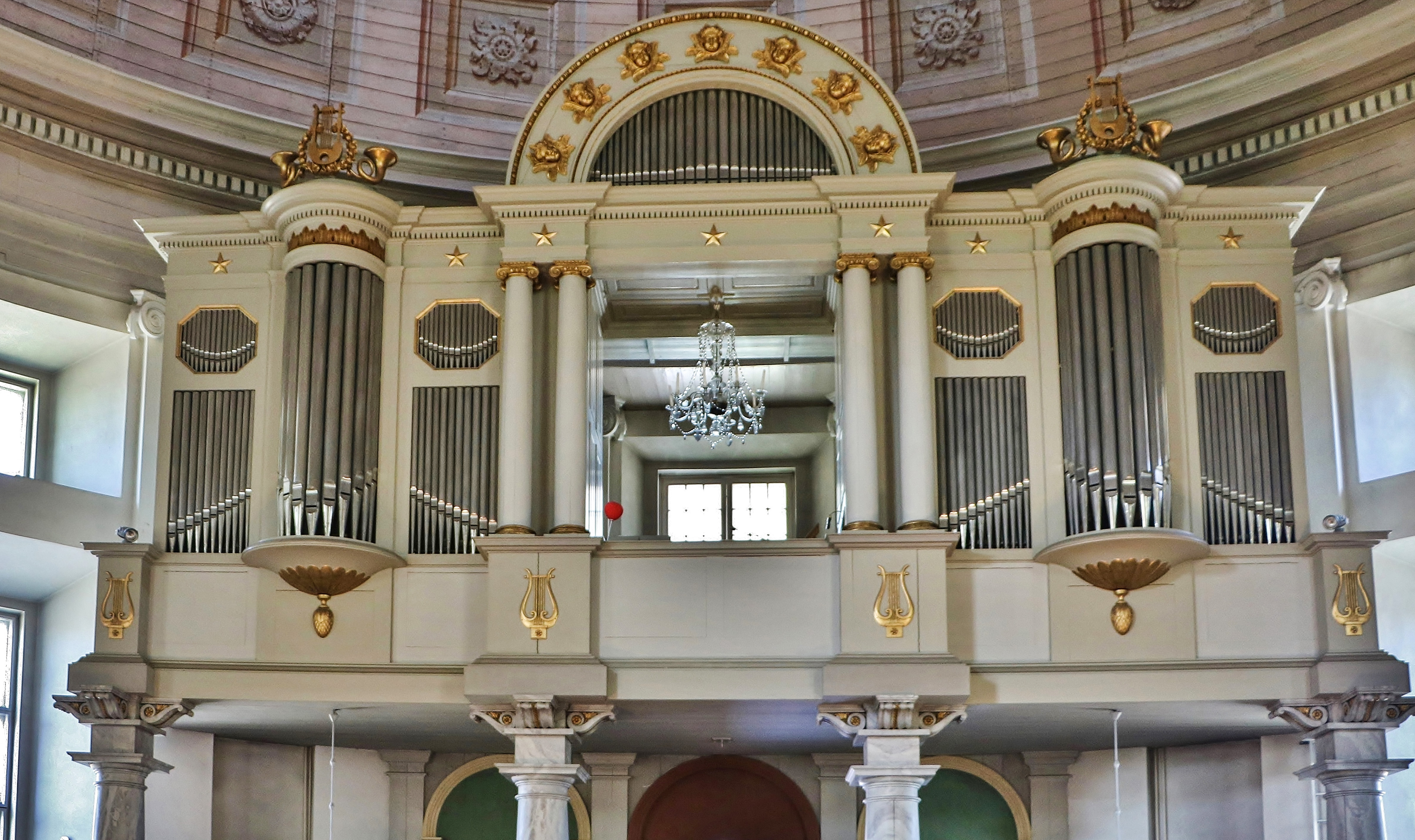
Organ
