= Royal Karlskrona Admiralty Parish =

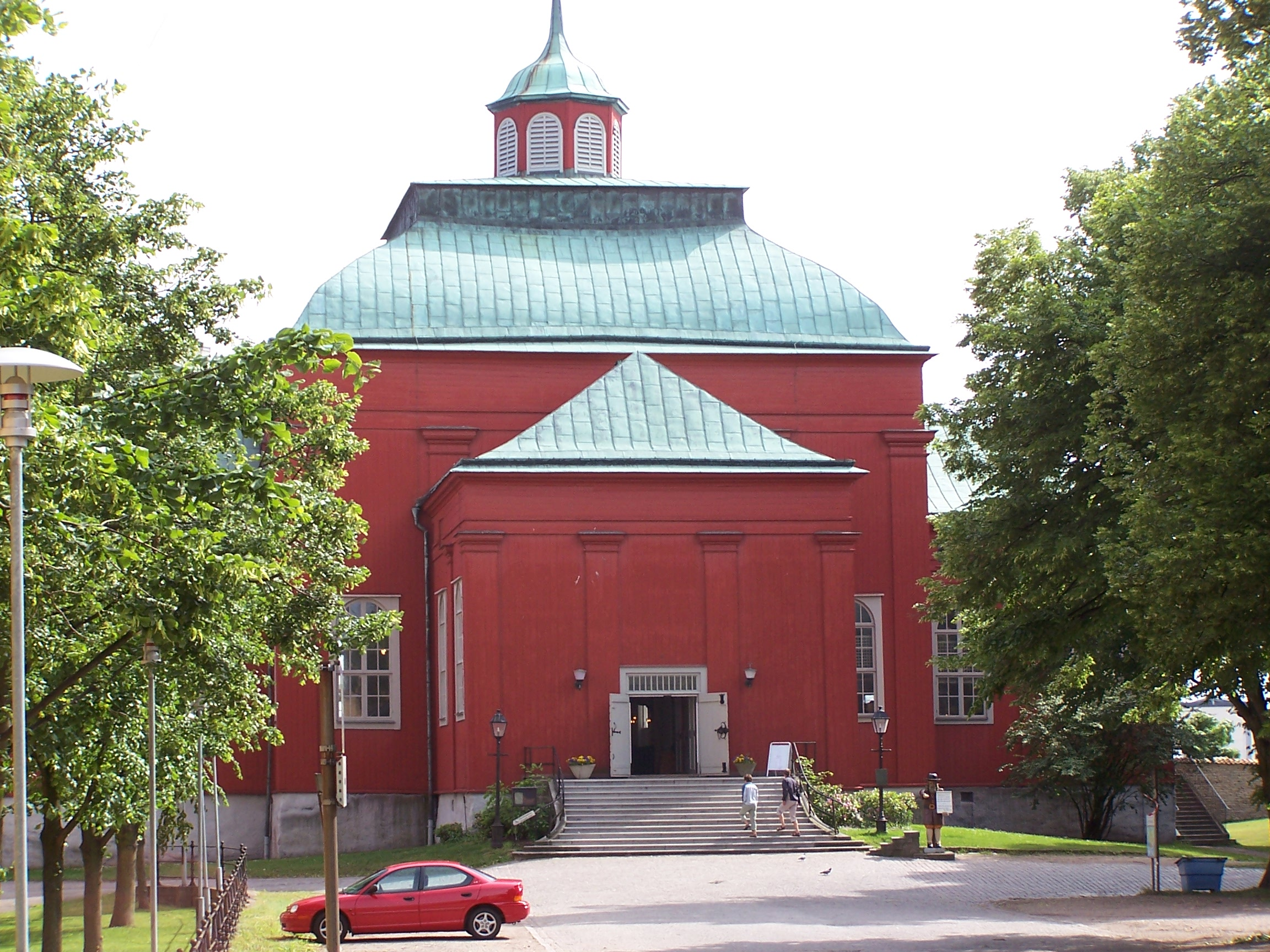
Church of the Admiralty Parish

The Royal Karlskrona Admiralty Parish (Swedish: Karlskrona amiralitetsförsamling) in Karlskrona, Sweden, is a non-territorial Lutheran parish for navy personnel and their families, which has existed in Karlskrona since 1685. Its church is the wooden "Admiralty Church" (Ulrica Pia) built in 1685, located close to the naval shipyard area. There was also an "Admiralty Parish" in Stockholm on Skeppsholmen between 1672 and 1970.
