= Rosenbom =

Wooden statue and donation receptacle

Coordinates: 56°09′25″N 15°35′28″E

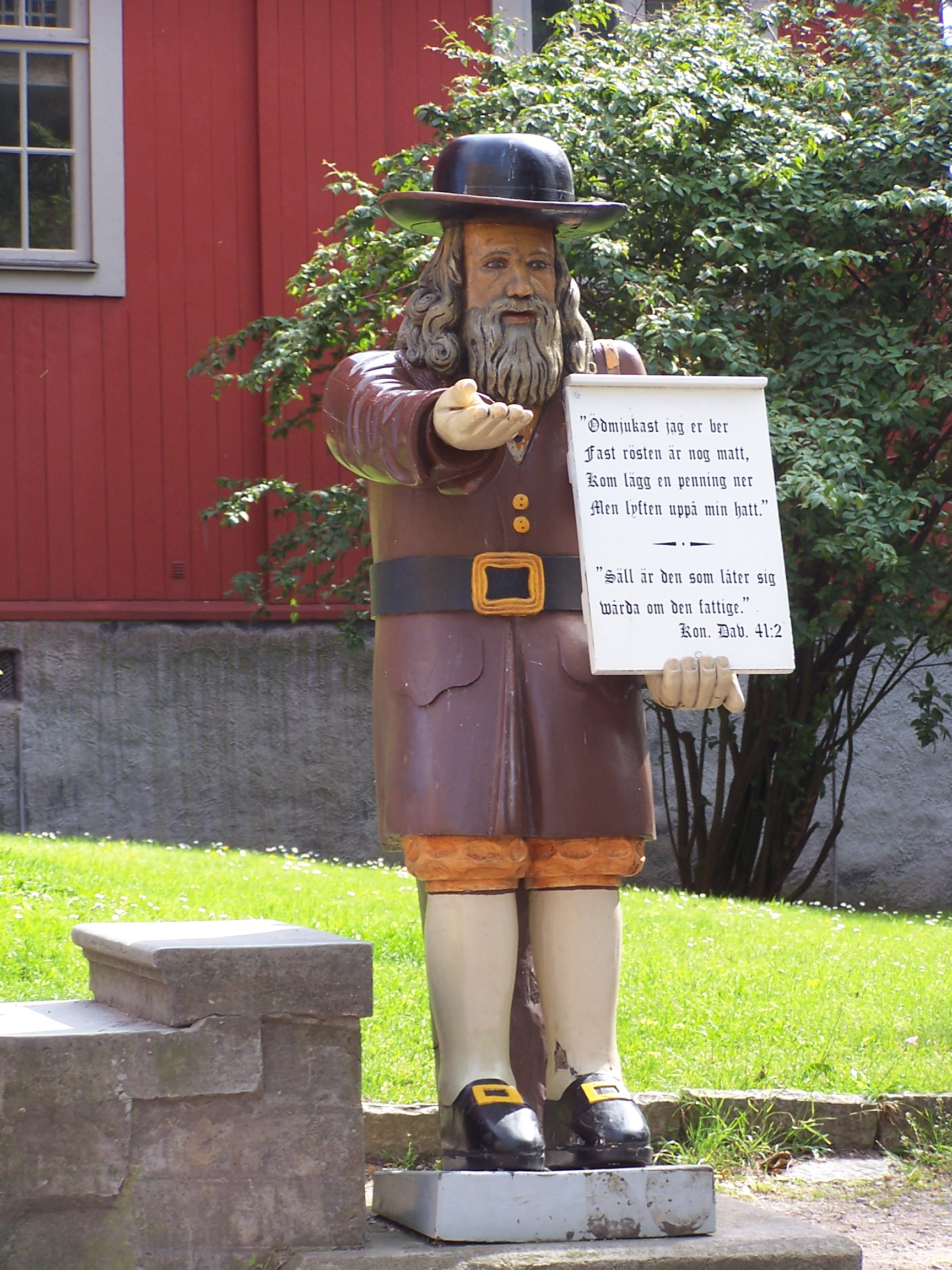
Old Rosenbom in front of the church

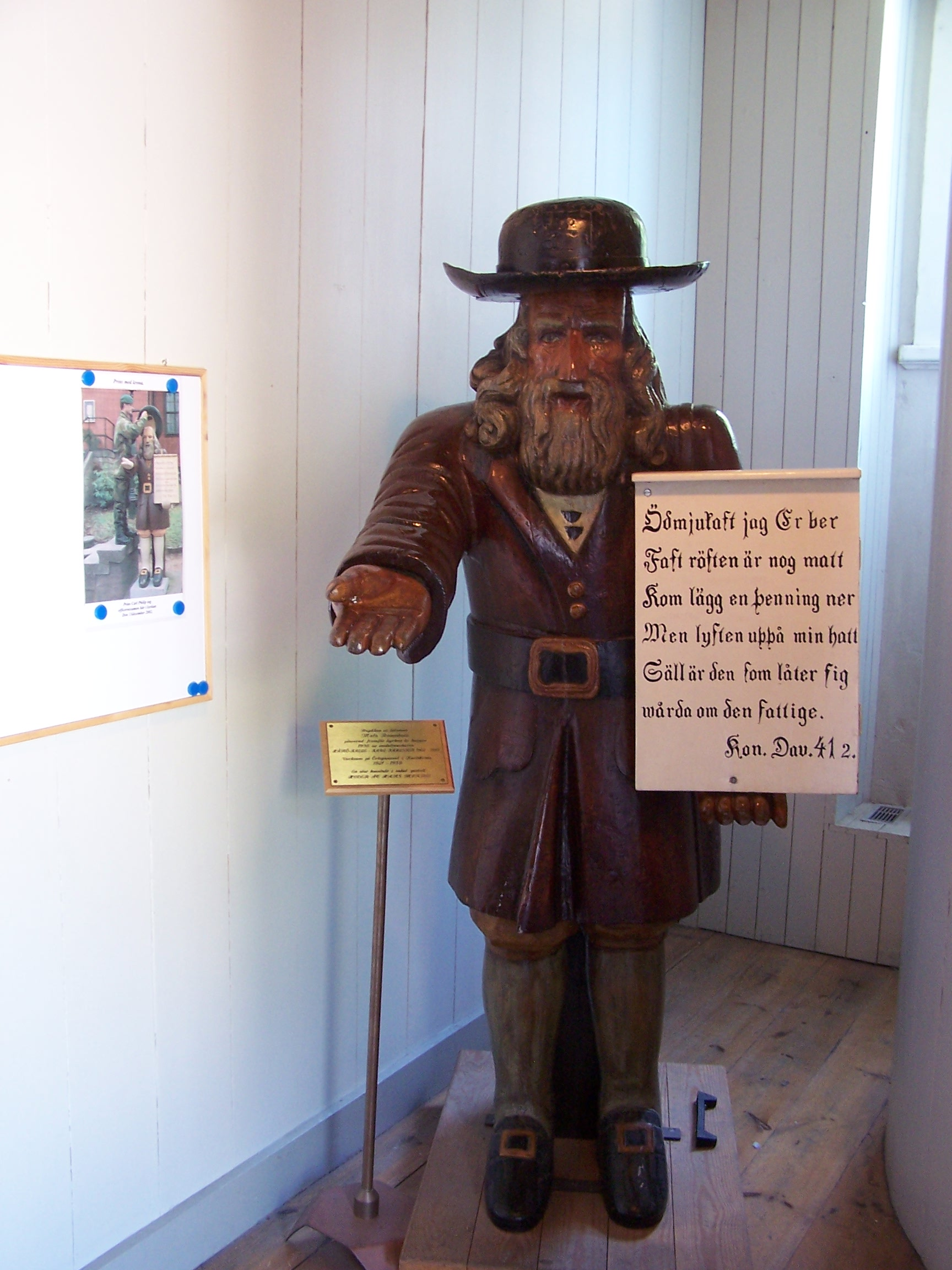
The original inside the church

In front of the Karlskrona Admiralty Church, in Sweden, the popular wooden figure of Gubben Rosenbom (Old Man Rosenbom) has been standing since the mid 18th century. In 1956 the original was replaced by a copy and put in a safer place inside the church. The life-size figure is actually a poor box, which means, if you lift its hat, you can insert a coin for the poor.

The figure holds a placard in one hand which states in a slightly old-fashioned Swedish:

I humbly beg of you,
even though my voice may be weak,
come and put a penny in
but first lift my hat.
Blessed are those that care for the poor.

The last sentence is from the Bible.

The figure of Rosenbom is particularly well-known because it is featured in Selma Lagerlöf's book The Wonderful Adventures of Nils. There, the title hero meets Rosenbom and speaks with him.
