= Fredrik Church =

Coordinates: 56.16111°N 15.5880°E

- Fredrikskyrkan
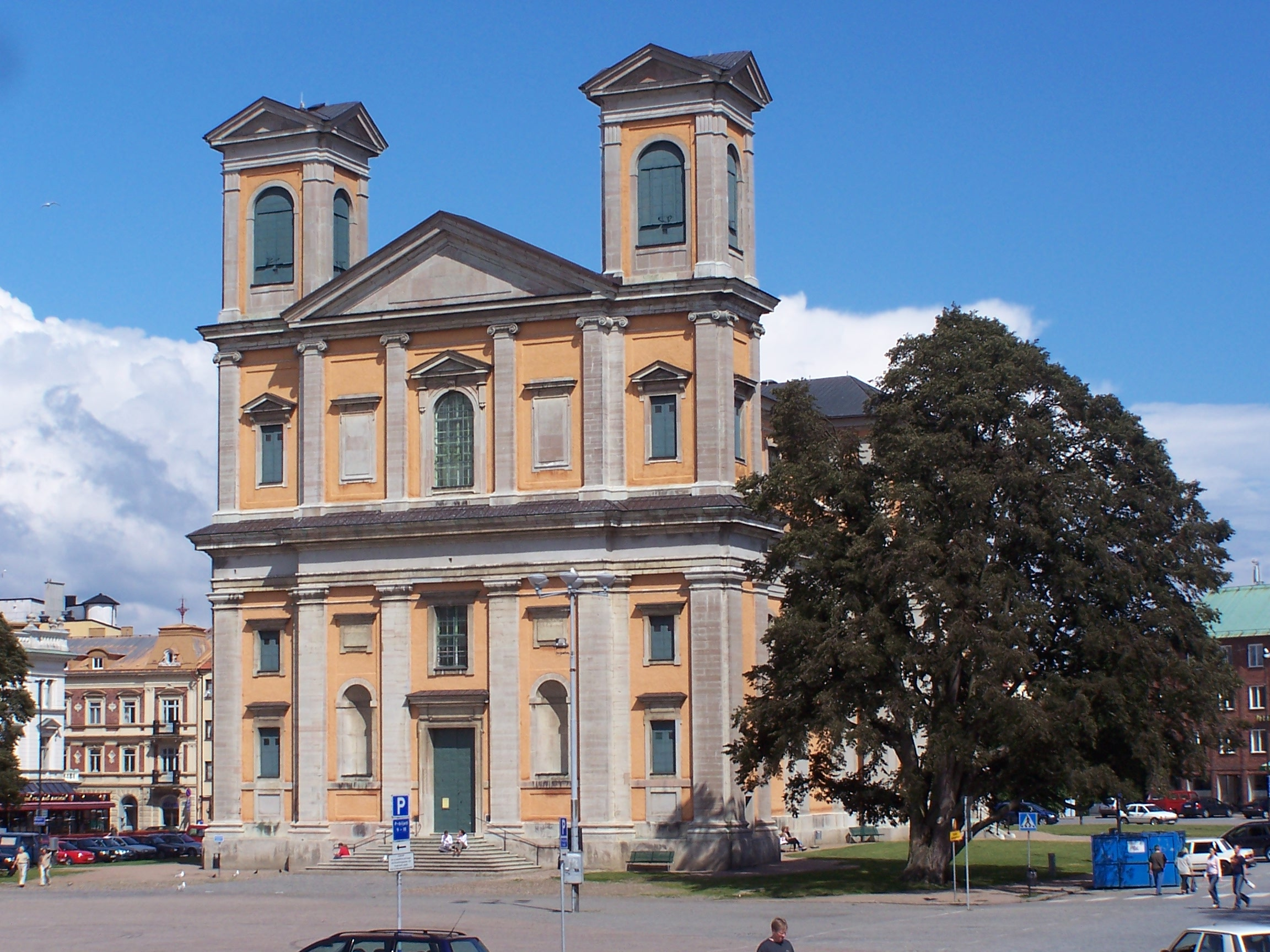
- Fredrik Church in June 2004
- Fredrik Church
- Location: Karlskrona
- Country: Sweden
- Denomination: Church of Sweden

History
- Consecrated: 1744

Administration
- Diocese: Lund
- Parish: Karlskrona Town

The Fredrik Church (Swedish: Fredrikskyrkan) is located in Karlskrona, Blekinge Län, southern Sweden. Situated on Stortorget, the main square in the city centre, The Fredrik Church is included within the Karlskrona UNESCO World Heritage Site.

== History ==
Construction on the Fredrik Church began September 9, 1720 as a replacement for the city's temporary wooden church, Hedvig Eleonora Church. The Fredrik Church's first stone was laid by the then Governor Salomon von Otter, the foundation wall was completed on August 25, 1721, and the church was consecrated in 1744. Though Crown Prince Adolf Frederick was present for the event, the building was named in honor of Frederick I. The spires atop the church towers were completed in 1758.

There were several restorations. The one in 1805–06 was led by architect Olof Tempelman. Interior restorations occurred in 1913–15 under Axel Lindegren, and there was another in 1967–68. An exterior restoration occurred in 1997–98.

== Architecture and fittings ==
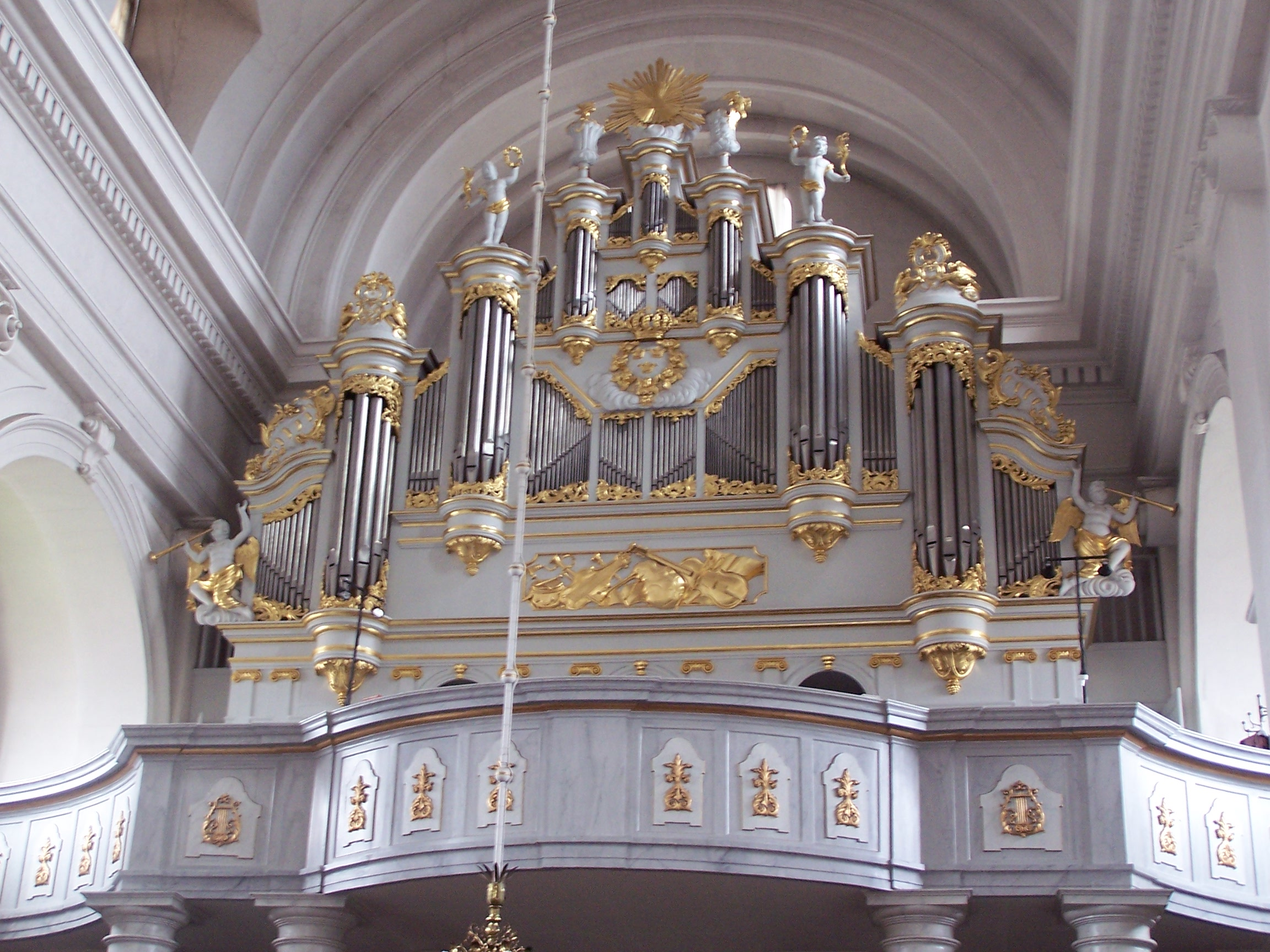
Organ inside the Fredrik Church.

The Fredrik Church was built in the Baroque style after a design by Nicodemus Tessin the Younger. Its towers are a notable feature. The carillon is housed in the south tower, and there are 35 bells, which were installed in 1967 by the Bergholtz Bellfoundry. The clock chimes three times a day.

The 1854 pulpit is in a neoclassical style by the design of architect Johan Adolf Hawerman; it predates the altar. The carved wood baptismal font was donated by the ship builder Gilbert Sheldon. The church silver is preserved in a massive safe.

The church's first organ came from Hedvig Eleonora Church. When a decision was made to purchase a larger and more suitable organ, Lars Wahlberg received the contract to build an organ with 29 stops, 2 manuals and a pedal. When it was finished in 1764, he had inserted the 34 voices that are driven by six large bellows. Wahlberg's organ was replaced in 1905 by one built by Åkerman & Lund Orgelbyggeri in Stockholm; it was reconstructed in 1982–87 by Grönlunds Orgelbyggeri.
