= List of United Kingdom locations: Bi =

The United Kingdom

This is part of the list of United Kingdom locations: a gazetteer of place names in the United Kingdom showing each place's locality and geographical coordinates.

== Bi ==
=== Bib-Big ===
Location	Locality	Coordinates (links to map & photo sources)	OS grid reference
Bibstone	South Gloucestershire	51.61°N 02.44°W	ST6991
Bibury	Gloucestershire	51.75°N 01.84°W	SP1106
Bicester	Oxfordshire	51.89°N 01.15°W	SP5822
Bickenhall	Somerset	50.95°N 03.02°W	ST2818
Bickenhill	Solihull	52.43°N 01.73°W	SP1882
Bicker	Lincolnshire	52.91°N 00.18°W	TF2237
Bicker Bar	Lincolnshire	52.92°N 00.17°W	TF2338
Bicker Gauntlet	Lincolnshire	52.93°N 00.20°W	TF2139
Bickershaw	Wigan	53.51°N 02.57°W	SD6202
Bickerstaffe	Lancashire	53.53°N 02.84°W	SD4404
Bickerton	Devon	50.23°N 03.66°W	SX8138
Bickerton	North Yorkshire	53.94°N 01.31°W	SE4550
Bickerton	Cheshire	53.06°N 02.74°W	SJ5052
Bickford	Staffordshire	52.72°N 02.17°W	SJ8814
Bickham	Somerset	51.15°N 03.50°W	SS9541
Bickingcott	Devon	51.03°N 03.75°W	SS7728
Bickington (Fremington nr Barnstaple)	Devon	51.06°N 04.09°W	SS5332
Bickington (Teignbridge)	Devon	50.53°N 03.70°W	SX7972
Bickleigh (Mid Devon)	Devon	50.85°N 03.50°W	SS9407
Bickleigh (South Hams)	Devon	50.43°N 04.08°W	SX5262
Bickleton	Devon	51.05°N 04.14°W	SS5031
Bickley	Bromley	51.40°N 00.04°E	TQ4269
Bickley	Worcestershire	52.33°N 02.54°W	SO6371
Bickley Moss	Cheshire	53.03°N 02.68°W	SJ5449
Bickley Town	Cheshire	53.02°N 02.70°W	SJ5348
Bickleywood	Cheshire	53.01°N 02.71°W	SJ5247
Bickmarsh	Worcestershire	52.13°N 01.85°W	SP1049
Bicknacre	Essex	51.68°N 00.57°E	TL7802
Bicknoller	Somerset	51.14°N 03.27°W	ST1139
Bicknor	Kent	51.29°N 00.66°E	TQ8658
Bickton	Hampshire	50.90°N 01.80°W	SU1412
Bicton	Herefordshire	52.26°N 02.79°W	SO4663
Bicton	Pembrokeshire	51.72°N 05.12°W	SM8407
Bicton (Shrewsbury and Acton)	Shropshire	52.73°N 02.83°W	SJ4415
Bicton (South Shropshire)	Shropshire	52.43°N 03.06°W	SO2882
Bicton Heath	Shropshire	52.71°N 02.81°W	SJ4513
Bidborough	Kent	51.16°N 00.23°E	TQ5643
Bidden	Hampshire	51.23°N 00.99°W	SU7049
Biddenden	Kent	51.11°N 00.62°E	TQ8438
Biddenden Green	Kent	51.15°N 00.68°E	TQ8843
Biddenham	Bedfordshire	52.13°N 00.51°W	TL0250
Biddestone	Wiltshire	51.45°N 02.20°W	ST8673
Biddick	Sunderland	54.88°N 01.53°W	NZ3055
Biddick Hall	South Tyneside	54.96°N 01.45°W	NZ3563
Biddisham	Somerset	51.27°N 02.89°W	ST3853
Biddlesden	Buckinghamshire	52.04°N 01.08°W	SP6339
Biddulph	Staffordshire	53.11°N 02.18°W	SJ8857
Biddulph Moor	Staffordshire	53.11°N 02.15°W	SJ9058
Bideford	Devon	51.01°N 04.22°W	SS4426
Bidford-on-Avon	Warwickshire	52.15°N 01.85°W	SP1051
Bidlake	Devon	50.67°N 04.13°W	SX4988
Bidston	Wirral	53.40°N 03.08°W	SJ2890
Bidston Hill	Wirral	53.39°N 03.08°W	SJ2889
Bidwell	Bedfordshire	51.90°N 00.53°W	TL0124
Bielby	East Riding of Yorkshire	53.87°N 00.81°W	SE7843
Bieldside	City of Aberdeen	57.10°N 02.19°W	NJ8802
Bierley	Bradford	53.76°N 01.72°W	SE1830
Bierley	Isle of Wight	50.59°N 01.28°W	SZ5178
Bierton	Buckinghamshire	51.82°N 00.79°W	SP8315
Bigbury	Devon	50.29°N 03.88°W	SX6646
Bigbury-on-Sea	Devon	50.28°N 03.89°W	SX6544
Bigby	Lincolnshire	53.54°N 00.41°W	TA0507
Bigfrith	Berkshire	51.54°N 00.77°W	SU8584
Bigga	Shetland Islands	60.49°N 01.19°W	HU443790
Biggar	South Lanarkshire	55.61°N 03.52°W	NT0437
Biggar	Cumbria	54.08°N 03.23°W	SD1966
Biggin (Hartington)	Derbyshire	53.12°N 01.77°W	SK1559
Biggin (near Hulland)	Derbyshire	53.02°N 01.61°W	SK2648
Biggin	Essex	51.46°N 00.37°E	TQ6577
Biggin	North Yorkshire	53.79°N 01.18°W	SE5434
Biggings	Shetland Islands	60.32°N 01.69°W	HU1760
Biggin Hill	Bromley	51.31°N 00.02°E	TQ4159
Biggleswade	Bedfordshire	52.08°N 00.26°W	TL1944
Bighton	Hampshire	51.10°N 01.13°W	SU6134
Biglands	Cumbria	54.86°N 03.17°W	NY2553
Big Mancot	Flintshire	53.19°N 03.03°W	SJ3167
Bignall End	Staffordshire	53.05°N 02.29°W	SJ8051
Bignor	West Sussex	50.91°N 00.60°W	SU9814
Bigods	Essex	51.89°N 00.35°E	TL6224
Bigrigg	Cumbria	54.50°N 03.54°W	NY0013
Big Sand	Highland	57.74°N 05.78°W	NG7579
Bigton	Shetland Islands	59.97°N 01.33°W	HU3721

=== Bil-Bin ===
Location	Locality	Coordinates (links to map & photo sources)	OS grid reference
Bilberry	Cornwall	50.40°N 04.78°W	SX0260
Bilborough	Nottinghamshire	52.96°N 01.22°W	SK5241
Bilbrook	Somerset	51.16°N 03.38°W	ST0341
Bilbrook	Staffordshire	52.62°N 02.17°W	SJ8803
Bilbrough	North Yorkshire	53.90°N 01.19°W	SE5346
Bilbster	Highland	58.45°N 03.23°W	ND2852
Bilbster Mains	Highland	58.46°N 03.23°W	ND2853
Bilby	Nottinghamshire	53.34°N 01.05°W	SK6383
Bildershaw	Durham	54.61°N 01.69°W	NZ2024
Bildeston	Suffolk	52.10°N 00.90°E	TL9949
Billacombe	Devon	50.36°N 04.08°W	SX5254
Billacott	Cornwall	50.68°N 04.47°W	SX2590
Billericay	Essex	51.62°N 00.41°E	TQ6794
Billesdon	Leicestershire	52.61°N 00.95°W	SK7102
Billesley	Birmingham	52.41°N 01.86°W	SP0980
Billesley	Warwickshire	52.20°N 01.79°W	SP1456
Billesley Common	Birmingham	52.41°N 01.88°W	SP0880
Billingborough	Lincolnshire	52.89°N 00.35°W	TF1134
Billinge	St Helens	53.49°N 02.70°W	SD5300
Billingford (South Norfolk)	Norfolk	52.35°N 01.17°E	TM1678
Billingford (Breckland)	Norfolk	52.74°N 00.97°E	TG0120
Billingham	Stockton-on-Tees	54.60°N 01.28°W	NZ4623
Billinghay	Lincolnshire	53.07°N 00.28°W	TF1554
Billingley	Barnsley	53.53°N 01.35°W	SE4304
Billingshurst	West Sussex	51.01°N 00.46°W	TQ0825
Billingsley	Shropshire	52.46°N 02.44°W	SO7085
Billington	Bedfordshire	51.88°N 00.63°W	SP9422
Billington	Lancashire	53.81°N 02.42°W	SD7235
Billington	Staffordshire	52.77°N 02.17°W	SJ8820
Billockby	Norfolk	52.66°N 01.57°E	TG4213
Bill Quay	Gateshead	54.95°N 01.54°W	NZ2962
Billy Mill	North Tyneside	55.01°N 01.48°W	NZ3369
Billy Row	Durham	54.72°N 01.75°W	NZ1637
Bilmarsh	Shropshire	52.82°N 02.75°W	SJ4925
Bilsborrow	Lancashire	53.84°N 02.74°W	SD5139
Bilsby	Lincolnshire	53.26°N 00.20°E	TF4776
Bilsby Field	Lincolnshire	53.25°N 00.18°E	TF4675
Bilsdon	Devon	50.70°N 03.67°W	SX8291
Bilsham	West Sussex	50.80°N 00.62°W	SU9702
Bilsington	Kent	51.06°N 00.91°E	TR0434
Bilson Green	Gloucestershire	51.82°N 02.50°W	SO6514
Bilsthorpe	Nottinghamshire	53.13°N 01.04°W	SK6460
Bilsthorpe Moor	Nottinghamshire	53.12°N 01.03°W	SK6559
Bilston	Midlothian	55.86°N 03.18°W	NT2664
Bilston	Wolverhampton	52.57°N 02.08°W	SO9497
Bilstone	Leicestershire	52.64°N 01.46°W	SK3605
Bilting	Kent	51.20°N 00.93°E	TR0549
Bilton	East Riding of Yorkshire	53.78°N 00.24°W	TA1633
Bilton	Harrogate, North Yorkshire	54.00°N 01.54°W	SE3057
Bilton	Northumberland	55.38°N 01.65°W	NU2210
Bilton	Warwickshire	52.35°N 01.29°W	SP4873
Bilton Haggs	North Yorkshire	53.93°N 01.30°W	SE4649
Bilton-in-Ainsty	North Yorkshire	53.94°N 01.28°W	SE4750
Bimbister	Orkney Islands	59.02°N 03.18°W	HY3216
Binbrook	Lincolnshire	53.42°N 00.18°W	TF2193
Binchester Blocks	Durham	54.68°N 01.66°W	NZ2232
Bincombe	Dorset	50.65°N 02.45°W	SY6884
Bincombe	Somerset	51.14°N 03.17°W	ST1839
Bindal	Highland	57.83°N 03.82°W	NH9284
Bindon	Somerset	51.00°N 03.28°W	ST1024
Binegar	Somerset	51.23°N 02.56°W	ST6149
Bines Green	West Sussex	50.94°N 00.32°W	TQ1817
Binfield	Berkshire	51.43°N 00.79°W	SU8471
Binfield Heath	Oxfordshire	51.49°N 00.93°W	SU7478
Bingfield	Northumberland	55.04°N 02.04°W	NY9772
Bingham	Nottinghamshire	52.94°N 00.95°W	SK7039
Bingham	City of Edinburgh	55.93°N 03.12°W	NT3072
Bingley	Bradford	53.84°N 01.83°W	SE1139
Bings Heath	Shropshire	52.75°N 02.68°W	SJ5418
Binham	Norfolk	52.91°N 00.94°E	TF9839
Binley	Coventry	52.39°N 01.45°W	SP3777
Binley	Hampshire	51.27°N 01.39°W	SU4253
Binley Woods	Warwickshire	52.38°N 01.42°W	SP3977
Binnegar	Dorset	50.68°N 02.18°W	SY8787
Binniehill	Falkirk	55.92°N 03.84°W	NS8572
Binscombe	Surrey	51.19°N 00.62°W	SU9645
Binsey	Oxfordshire	51.75°N 01.29°W	SP4907
Binsoe	North Yorkshire	54.20°N 01.61°W	SE2579
Binstead	Isle of Wight	50.72°N 01.19°W	SZ5792
Binsted	Hampshire	51.16°N 00.90°W	SU7741
Binsted	West Sussex	50.84°N 00.60°W	SU9806
Binton	Warwickshire	52.18°N 01.79°W	SP1454
Bintree	Norfolk	52.76°N 00.97°E	TG0123

=== Bir-Bix ===
Location	Locality	Coordinates (links to map & photo sources)	OS grid reference
Birch	Essex	51.83°N 00.81°E	TL9419
Birch	Rochdale	53.55°N 02.22°W	SD8507
Birch Acre	Worcestershire	52.35°N 01.89°W	SP0773
Birchall	Herefordshire	52.03°N 02.51°W	SO6538
Birchall	Staffordshire	53.08°N 02.03°W	SJ9854
Bircham Newton	Norfolk	52.86°N 00.61°E	TF7633
Bircham Tofts	Norfolk	52.85°N 00.62°E	TF7732
Birchanger	Essex	51.87°N 00.19°E	TL5122
Birch Berrow	Worcestershire	52.27°N 02.39°W	SO7364
Birchburn	North Ayrshire	55.51°N 05.31°W	NR9129
Birch Cross	Staffordshire	52.86°N 01.82°W	SK1230
Birchden	East Sussex	51.10°N 00.18°E	TQ5336
Birichen	Highland	57.90°N 04.09°W	NH7692
Birchencliffe	Kirklees	53.65°N 01.83°W	SE1118
Birchen Coppice	Worcestershire	52.36°N 02.28°W	SO8174
Birchend	Herefordshire	52.09°N 02.49°W	SO6644
Birchendale	Staffordshire	52.93°N 01.92°W	SK0538
Bircher	Herefordshire	52.28°N 02.77°W	SO4765
Birches Green	Birmingham	52.50°N 01.83°W	SP1190
Birches Head	City of Stoke-on-Trent	53.02°N 02.16°W	SJ8948
Birchett's Green	East Sussex	51.05°N 00.36°E	TQ6631
Birchfield	Birmingham	52.50°N 01.89°W	SP0790
Birch Green	Essex	51.82°N 00.81°E	TL9418
Birch Green	Herefordshire	52.10°N 02.22°W	SO8545
Birch Green	Hertfordshire	51.78°N 00.13°W	TL2911
Birch Green	Lancashire	53.54°N 02.77°W	SD4906
Birchgrove	West Sussex	51.04°N -00.00°E	TQ4029
Birchgrove	Swansea	51.66°N 03.88°W	SS7098
Birchgrove	Caerdydd (Cardiff)	51.51°N 03.21°W	ST1680
Birchhall Corner	Essex	51.93°N 00.96°E	TM0430
Birch Heath	Cheshire	53.14°N 02.68°W	SJ5461
Birch Hill	Berkshire	51.38°N 00.75°W	SU8766
Birchill	Devon	50.82°N 02.99°W	ST3003
Birchills	Walsall	52.58°N 02.00°W	SP0099
Birchington	Kent	51.37°N 01.30°E	TR3069
Birchley Heath	Warwickshire	52.54°N 01.58°W	SP2894
Birchmoor	Warwickshire	52.60°N 01.63°W	SK2501
Birchmoor Green	Bedfordshire	51.98°N 00.63°W	SP9433
Bircholt Forstal	Kent	51.13°N 00.97°E	TR0841
Birchover	Derbyshire	53.15°N 01.65°W	SK2362
Birch Vale	Derbyshire	53.37°N 01.97°W	SK0286
Birchwood	Cheshire	53.41°N 02.54°W	SJ6491
Birchwood	Hertfordshire	51.76°N 00.23°W	TL2209
Birchwood	Lincolnshire	53.21°N 00.60°W	SK9369
Birchwood	Somerset	50.92°N 03.08°W	ST2414
Birchwood Corner	Kent	51.405°N 0.162°E	TQ505695
Birchy Hill	Hampshire	50.78°N 01.60°W	SZ2898
Bircotes	Nottinghamshire	53.41°N 01.05°W	SK6391
Birdbrook	Essex	52.04°N 00.47°E	TL7041
Birdbush	Wiltshire	51.00°N 02.12°W	ST9123
Birdfield	Argyll and Bute	56.09°N 05.28°W	NR9694
Birdforth	North Yorkshire	54.16°N 01.26°W	SE4875
Bird Green	Essex	51.97°N 00.10°E	TL4533
Birdham	West Sussex	50.79°N 00.83°W	SU8200
Birdholme	Derbyshire	53.21°N 01.43°W	SK3869
Birdingbury	Warwickshire	52.30°N 01.37°W	SP4368
Birdlip	Gloucestershire	51.82°N 02.11°W	SO9214
Bird Obsy	Shetland Islands	59.53°N 01.61°W	HZ2272
Birdsall	North Yorkshire	54.07°N 00.76°W	SE8165
Birdsedge	Kirklees	53.55°N 01.69°W	SE2007
Birds End	Suffolk	52.21°N 00.58°E	TL7760
Birdsgreen	Shropshire	52.45°N 02.35°W	SO7684
Birds Green	Essex	51.74°N 00.28°E	TL5808
Birdsmoorgate	Dorset	50.79°N 02.86°W	ST3900
Birdston	East Dunbartonshire	55.94°N 04.16°W	NS6575
Bird Street	Suffolk	52.13°N 00.92°E	TM0052
Birdwell	Barnsley	53.50°N 01.48°W	SE3401
Birdwood	Gloucestershire	51.86°N 02.37°W	SO7418
Birgham	Scottish Borders	55.64°N 02.33°W	NT7939
Birkacre	Lancashire	53.63°N 02.65°W	SD5715
Birkby	Cumbria	54.71°N 03.47°W	NY0537
Birkby	North Yorkshire	54.41°N 01.49°W	NZ3302
Birkby	Kirklees	53.65°N 01.80°W	SE1318
Birkdale	Sefton	53.62°N 03.01°W	SD3315
Birkenhead	Wirral	53.38°N 03.05°W	SJ3088
Birkenshaw	Kirklees	53.74°N 01.69°W	SE2028
Birkenshaw	North Lanarkshire	55.83°N 04.09°W	NS6962
Birkenshaw	South Lanarkshire	55.71°N 03.97°W	NS7649
Birkenshaw Bottoms	Kirklees	53.73°N 01.68°W	SE2127
Birkenside	Scottish Borders	55.67°N 02.70°W	NT5642
Birkett Mire	Cumbria	54.60°N 03.06°W	NY3124
Birkhill	Scottish Borders	55.67°N 02.70°W	NT5642
Birkhill	Angus	56.49°N 03.05°W	NO3534
Birkholme	Lincolnshire	52.79°N 00.56°W	SK9723
Birkhouse	Calderdale	53.71°N 01.77°W	SE1524
Birkin	North Yorkshire	53.72°N 01.19°W	SE5326
Birks	Leeds	53.73°N 01.60°W	SE2626
Birkshaw	Northumberland	54.97°N 02.36°W	NY7765
Birley	Herefordshire	52.17°N 02.80°W	SO4553
Birley	Sheffield	53.34°N 01.40°W	SK402830
Birley Carr	Sheffield	53.42°N 01.50°W	SK3392
Birley Edge	Sheffield	53.42°N 01.50°W	SK3392
Birleyhay	Derbyshire	53.31°N 01.41°W	SK3980
Birling	Kent	51.31°N 00.40°E	TQ6860
Birling Gap	East Sussex	50.74°N 00.19°E	TV5596
Birlingham	Worcestershire	52.08°N 02.10°W	SO9343
Birmingham	City of Birmingham	52.48°N 01.86°W	SP0987
Birnam	Perth and Kinross	56.55°N 03.57°W	NO0341
Birniehill	South Lanarkshire	55.75°N 04.16°W	NS6453
Birse	Aberdeenshire	57.06°N 02.74°W	NO5597
Birsemore	Aberdeenshire	57.06°N 02.79°W	NO5297
Birstall	Kirklees	53.73°N 01.66°W	SE2226
Birstall	Leicestershire	52.67°N 01.12°W	SK5909
Birstall Smithies	Kirklees	53.72°N 01.66°W	SE2225
Birstwith	North Yorkshire	54.02°N 01.65°W	SE2359
Birthorpe	Lincolnshire	52.88°N 00.36°W	TF1033
Birtle	Rochdale	53.61°N 02.25°W	SD8313
Birtley	Herefordshire	52.31°N 02.94°W	SO3669
Birtley	Shropshire	52.50°N 02.78°W	SO4790
Birtley	Northumberland	55.09°N 02.20°W	NY8778
Birtley	Gateshead	54.89°N 01.58°W	NZ2756
Birtley Green	Surrey	51.17°N 00.55°W	TQ0143
Birtsmorton	Worcestershire	52.01°N 02.29°W	SO8035
Birts Street	Worcestershire	52.02°N 02.32°W	SO7836
Bisbrooke	Rutland	52.58°N 00.70°W	SP8899
Biscathorpe	Lincolnshire	53.33°N 00.16°W	TF2284
Biscombe	Somerset	50.91°N 03.18°W	ST1713
Biscot	Luton	51.88°N 00.43°W	TL0822
Biscovey	Cornwall	50.34°N 04.72°W	SX0653
Bisham	Berkshire	51.55°N 00.77°W	SU8585
Bishampton	Worcestershire	52.15°N 02.03°W	SO9851
Bish Mill	Devon	51.01°N 03.79°W	SS7425
Bishon Common	Herefordshire	52.08°N 02.84°W	SO4243
Bishop Auckland	Durham	54.64°N 01.69°W	NZ2129
Bishopbridge	Lincolnshire	53.40°N 00.45°W	TF0391
Bishopbriggs	East Dunbartonshire	55.90°N 04.22°W	NS6170
Bishop Burton	East Riding of Yorkshire	53.83°N 00.51°W	SE9839
Bishopdown	Wiltshire	51.07°N 01.78°W	SU1531
Bishop Kinkell	Highland	57.54°N 04.44°W	NH5453
Bishop Middleham	Durham	54.67°N 01.48°W	NZ3331
Bishopmill	Moray	57.65°N 03.32°W	NJ2163
Bishop Monkton	North Yorkshire	54.08°N 01.51°W	SE3266
Bishop Norton	Lincolnshire	53.41°N 00.52°W	SK9892
Bishopsbourne	Kent	51.22°N 01.12°E	TR1852
Bishops Cannings	Wiltshire	51.37°N 01.95°W	SU0364
Bishop's Castle	Shropshire	52.48°N 03.00°W	SO3288
Bishop's Caundle	Dorset	50.91°N 02.44°W	ST6913
Bishop's Cleeve	Gloucestershire	51.94°N 02.07°W	SO9527
Bishop's Court	Isle of Man	54.29°N 04.58°W	SC3292
Bishop's Down	Dorset	50.90°N 02.47°W	ST6712
Bishop's Frome	Herefordshire	52.12°N 02.49°W	SO6648
Bishopsgarth	Stockton-on-Tees	54.57°N 01.36°W	NZ4120
Bishopsgate	Surrey	51.42°N 00.59°W	SU9871
Bishops Green	Essex	51.82°N 00.34°E	TL6217
Bishop's Green	Hampshire	51.36°N 01.28°W	SU5063
Bishop's Hull	Somerset	51.00°N 03.14°W	ST2024
Bishop's Itchington	Warwickshire	52.21°N 01.43°W	SP3957
Bishops Lydeard	Somerset	51.05°N 03.19°W	ST1629
Bishop's Norton	Gloucestershire	51.91°N 02.23°W	SO8424
Bishop's Nympton	Devon	50.99°N 03.78°W	SS7523
Bishop's Offley	Staffordshire	52.85°N 02.34°W	SJ7729
Bishop's Quay	Cornwall	50.08°N 05.18°W	SW7225
Bishop's Stortford	Hertfordshire	51.86°N 00.16°E	TL4921
Bishop's Sutton	Hampshire	51.07°N 01.14°W	SU6031
Bishop's Tachbrook	Warwickshire	52.24°N 01.54°W	SP3161
Bishop's Tawton	Devon	51.05°N 04.05°W	SS5630
Bishopsteignton	Devon	50.54°N 03.55°W	SX9073
Bishopstoke	Hampshire	50.96°N 01.34°W	SU4619
Bishopston	Swansea	51.57°N 04.06°W	SS5788
Bishopston	City of Bristol	51.47°N 02.60°W	ST5875
Bishopstone	Wiltshire	51.02°N 01.90°W	SU0725
Bishopstone	East Sussex	50.79°N 00.08°E	TQ4701
Bishopstone	Herefordshire	52.08°N 02.86°W	SO4143
Bishopstone	Buckinghamshire	51.78°N 00.84°W	SP8010
Bishopstone	Swindon	51.54°N 01.65°W	SU2483
Bishopstone	Kent	51.36°N 01.15°E	TR2068
Bishopstrow	Wiltshire	51.18°N 02.15°W	ST8943
Bishop Sutton	Bath and North East Somerset	51.32°N 02.60°W	ST5859
Bishop's Waltham	Hampshire	50.94°N 01.21°W	SU5517
Bishopswood	Somerset	50.90°N 03.06°W	ST2512
Bishops Wood	Staffordshire	52.67°N 02.25°W	SJ8309
Bishopsworth	City of Bristol	51.40°N 02.61°W	ST5768
Bishop Thornton	North Yorkshire	54.06°N 01.60°W	SE2663
Bishopthorpe	York	53.91°N 01.10°W	SE5947
Bishopton	Darlington	54.58°N 01.44°W	NZ3621
Bishopton	Dumfries and Galloway	54.73°N 04.44°W	NX4341
Bishopton	North Yorkshire	54.13°N 01.55°W	SE2971
Bishopton	Renfrewshire	55.90°N 04.51°W	NS4371
Bishopton	Warwickshire	52.20°N 01.72°W	SP1956
Bishopwearmouth	Sunderland	54.89°N 01.39°W	NZ3956
Bishop Wilton	East Riding of Yorkshire	53.98°N 00.79°W	SE7955
Bishpool	City of Newport	51.58°N 02.95°W	ST3488
Bishton	City of Newport	51.57°N 02.88°W	ST3987
Bishton	Staffordshire	52.77°N 01.97°W	SK0220
Bisley	Gloucestershire	51.75°N 02.14°W	SO9006
Bisley	Surrey	51.32°N 00.63°W	SU9559
Bisley Camp	Surrey	51.30°N 00.66°W	SU9357
Bispham	Lancashire	53.85°N 03.06°W	SD3040
Bispham Green	Lancashire	53.61°N 02.78°W	SD4813
Bissoe	Cornwall	50.22°N 05.12°W	SW7741
Bissom	Cornwall	50.16°N 05.09°W	SW7934
Bisterne	Hampshire	50.80°N 01.80°W	SU1401
Bisterne Close	Hampshire	50.81°N 01.68°W	SU2202
Bitchet Green	Kent	51.26°N 00.24°E	TQ5754
Bitchfield	Lincolnshire	52.84°N 00.54°W	SK9828
Bittadon	Devon	51.14°N 04.08°W	SS5441
Bittaford	Devon	50.39°N 03.88°W	SX6657
Bittering	Norfolk	52.71°N 00.85°E	TF9317
Bitterley	Shropshire	52.38°N 02.64°W	SO5677
Bitterne	City of Southampton	50.91°N 01.36°W	SU4513
Bitterne Park	City of Southampton	50.92°N 01.37°W	SU4414
Bitterscote	Staffordshire	52.62°N 01.70°W	SK2003
Bitteswell	Leicestershire	52.46°N 01.22°W	SP5385
Bittles Green	Dorset	51.01°N 02.21°W	ST8524
Bitton	South Gloucestershire	51.41°N 02.46°W	ST6869
Bix	Oxfordshire	51.55°N 00.96°W	SU7285
Bixter	Shetland Islands	60.25°N 01.40°W	HU3352
