= Offshore transmission owner =

Offshore Transmission Owners (OFTOs) operate and maintain offshore electric power transmission infrastructure in Great Britain, delivering electrical power from offshore wind farms to the National Grid. OFTOs may design and build this transmission infrastructure, but in most cases wind farm developers construct the electrical transmission assets and then sell them to an OFTO once complete.

== Operation ==
In the British electricity market, different functions of the electricity system are separated, with this practice beginning in the 1980s. The activities of generators, transmission operators, system operators, distribution operators and suppliers are separately licensed by Ofgem, with a single business unable to perform multiple functions due to UK Competition Law.

The groundwork for the offshore transmission regime was laid by the Energy Act 2004, with the first offshore transmission license being awarded in 2011. As of 2021, all the offshore transmission infrastructure in Great Britain has been built by wind farm developers, who are then required to sell their transmission assets to a separately licensed Offshore Transmission Owner. The divestment must take place before the Generator Commissioning Clause date, on which the exemption from this requirement lapses.

Divestment is managed via a regulated tender process administered by the energy regulator Ofgem. Qualifying bidders are required to conduct due diligence before submitting a bid to purchase the assets for transfer value determined by Ofgem and receive their bid Tender Revenue Stream (TRS) for a fixed license period. Ofgem then appoints a Preferred Bidder who negotiates the purchase terms with the Developer, after which Ofgem awards a transmission license and the transfer takes place.

== Offshore transmission operators ==
Windfarm	Developer	Capacity (MW)	Final Transfer Value (£m)	OFTO	License Award Date
Tender Round 1
Robin Rigg	E.ON	180	65.5	Transmission Capital Partners	2 March 2011
Gunfleet Sands	Ørsted	173	49.5	Transmission Capital Partners	19 July 2011
Barrow	Ørsted and Centrica	90	33.6	Transmission Capital Partners	27 September 2011
Walney 1	Ørsted, SSE and OPW	184	105.4	Blue Transmission	21 October 2011
Ormonde	Vattenfall	150	103.9	Transmission Capital Partners	10 July 2012
Walney 2	Ørsted, SSE and OPW	184	109.8	Blue Transmission	26 September 2012
Sheringham Shoal	Scira	315	193.1	Blue Transmission	27 June 2013
Greater Gabbard	SSE and RWE	504	317.1	Equitix Group	26 November 2013
Thanet	Vattenfall	300	164.8	Balfour Beatty	17 December 2014
Tender Round 2
London Array	Ørsted, E.on and Masdar	630	444	Blue Transmission	10 September 2013
Lincs	Ørsted, Centrica, and Siemens	270	307.7	Transmission Capital Partners	4 November 2014
Gwynt y Môr	RWE, Stadewerke München and Siemens	574	351.9	Balfour Beatty	11 February 2015
West of Duddon Sands	Ørsted and Scottish Power Renewables	388	268.9	West of Duddon Sands Transmission Plc	19 August 2015.
Tender Round 3
Westermost Rough	Ørsted, Marubeni and GIB	205	172.3	Transmission Capital Partners	3 February 2016
Humber Gateway	E.ON	219	173.3	Balfour Beatty	September 2016
Tender Round 4
Burbo Bank	Ørsted	258	193.9	Diamond Transmission Partners	25 April 2018
Tender Round 5
Dudgeon	Equinor	402	297.9	Transmission Capital Partners	5 November 2018
Race Bank	Ørsted	573	472.5	Diamond Transmission Partners	9 October 2019
Galloper	RWE	340	281.8	Diamond Transmission Partners	24 February 2020
Walney Extension	Ørsted	600	446.6	Diamond Transmission Partners	1 June 2020
Rampion	E.ON	400	279.5	Transmission Capital Partners & International Public Partnerships Limited	12 November 2021
Tender Round 6
Hornsea One	Ørsted	1218	1170	Diamond Transmission Partners	1 March 2021
Beatrice	SSE, Red Rock Power Ltd, The Renewables Infrastructure Group and Equitix	588	437.9	Transmission Capital Partners	27 July 2021
East Anglia One	ScottishPower Renewables and Vattenfall	714	692.6	Transmission Capital Partners	15 December 2022
Tender Round 7 (in progress)
Moray East	Diamond Green Limited, Moray Offshore Renewable Power Limited, Delphis Holdings Limited, China Three Gorges Limited	900	666.1	Transmission Capital Partners	15 February 2024
Triton Knoll	RWE Renewables, J-Power, Kansai	857	572.7	ETEPCO	
Tender Round 8 (in progress)
Hornsea Two	Ørsted	1,368	1141.2	Diamond Transmission Partners	
Tender Round 9 (in progress)
Seagreen Phase 1	Seagreen Wind Energy Limited	1,140		ETEPCO (preferred bidder)	
Tender Round 10 (in progress)
Moray West	Moray Offshore Windfarm (West) Limited	882			
Neart Na Gaoithe	Neart na Gaoithe Offshore Wind Limited	448			
Dogger Bank A	DBA Projco	1,200		ETEPCO (preferred bidder)	
Tender Round 11 (in progress)
Dogger Bank B	DBB Projco	1,200			
