= Race Bank wind farm =

Offshore wind farm off Norfolk, England

Race Bank Wind Farm
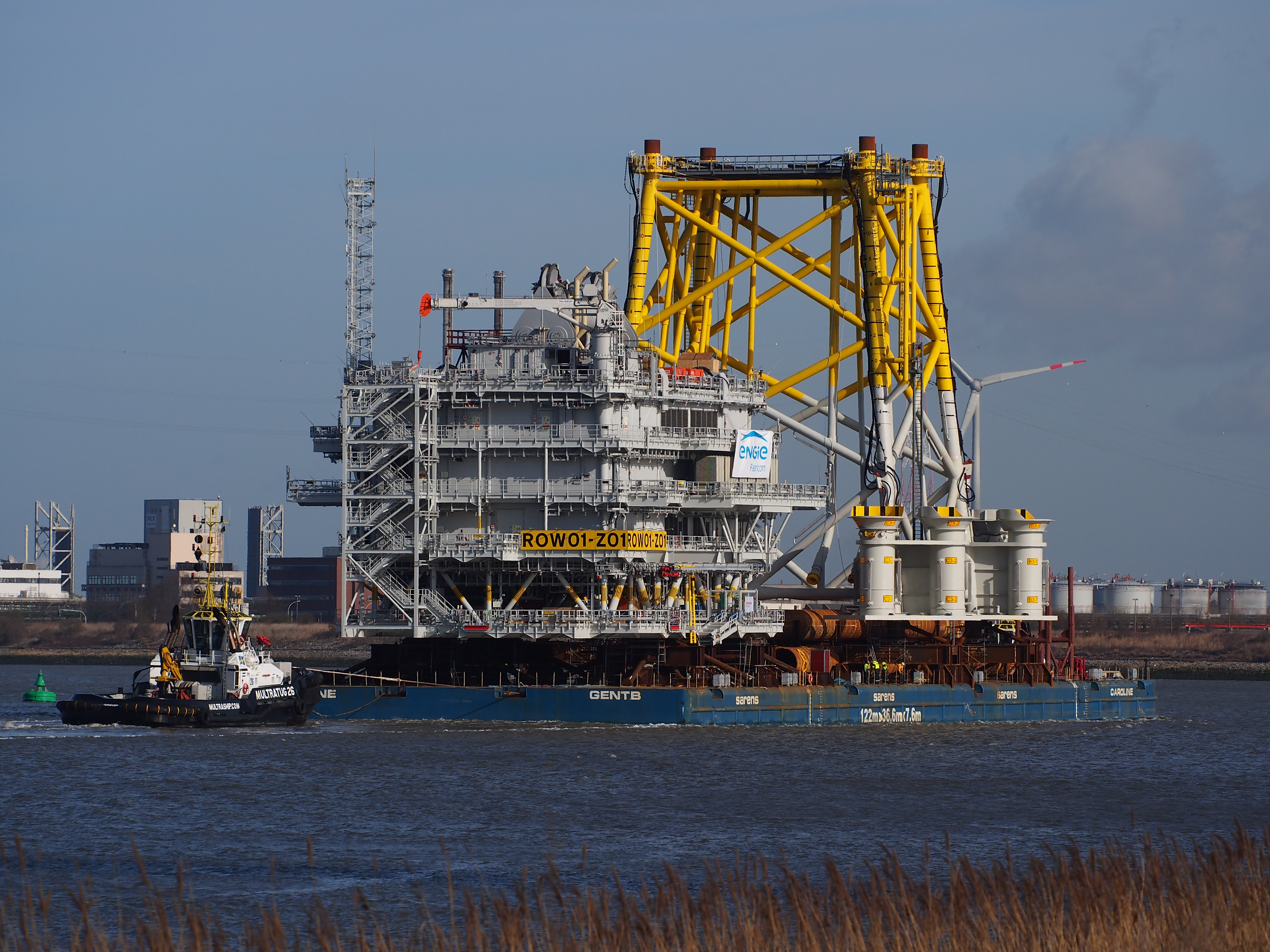
- Country: United Kingdom
- Location: 27 km off the coast of north Norfolk
- Coordinates: 53°16′30″N 0°50′00″E
- Status: Operational
- Construction began: 2016
- Commission date: February 2018
- Owners: Macquarie European Infrastructure Fund 5; Sumitomo Corporation; Ørsted

Wind farm
- Type: Offshore
- Max. water depth: 26 m
- Distance from shore: 32 km
- Rotor diameter: 154 m (505 ft)

Power generation
- Units operational: 91 × 6 MW
- Make and model: Siemens Gamesa SWT-6.0-154 (91)
- Nameplate capacity: 573 MW

Wind farm layout

Race Bank Wind Farm is a 573 MW Round 2 offshore wind farm located 27 km north of Blakeney Point off the coast of Norfolk, and 28 km east of Chapel St Leonards off the Lincolnshire coast in the North Sea. The farm was commissioned in February 2018.

== History ==
=== Planning ===
In 2002 the UK government designated the Greater Wash strategic area as potential offshore wind farm development region. In 2004, Centrica was awarded a lease by The Crown Estate during the Round 2 wind farm leasing process to develop a wind farm on Race Bank. The wind farm site was located on a sandbank approximately 27 kilometres (17 mi) north of the north Norfolk coast, and 28 kilometres (17 mi) east of the Lincolnshire coast, with an estimated maximum capacity of 620 MW. The scheme was developed in association with AMEC and the RES Group. The wind farm was to connect to the National Grid at Walpole, together with two of Centrica's other Round 2 wind farms, Lincs Wind Farm and Docking Shoal Wind Farm. (Note: Lincs, Docking Shoal and Race Bank wind farms were to share the same onshore cable export route, and onshore substation. The environmental statement for the onshore works was submitted as part of the Lincs Wind Farm application.)

In 2009 Centrica submitted a planning consent application for a wind farm of up 620 MW capacity. The proposed wind farm covered an area of 75 square kilometres (29 sq mi) at water depths of 4 to 22 metres (13 to 72 ft).

In July 2012 the government gave planning approval for Centrica to construct a wind farm to the capacity of 580 MW.

In November 2013 the project failed to be shortlisted for early contract for difference subsidies from the Department of Energy and Climate Change, putting the future of the project in doubt; in December 2013, Centrica sold the project to DONG Energy for £50 million.

As of May 2014, Dong Energy estimated that onshore construction will begin in spring 2015 at the earliest, followed by offshore construction in spring 2016.

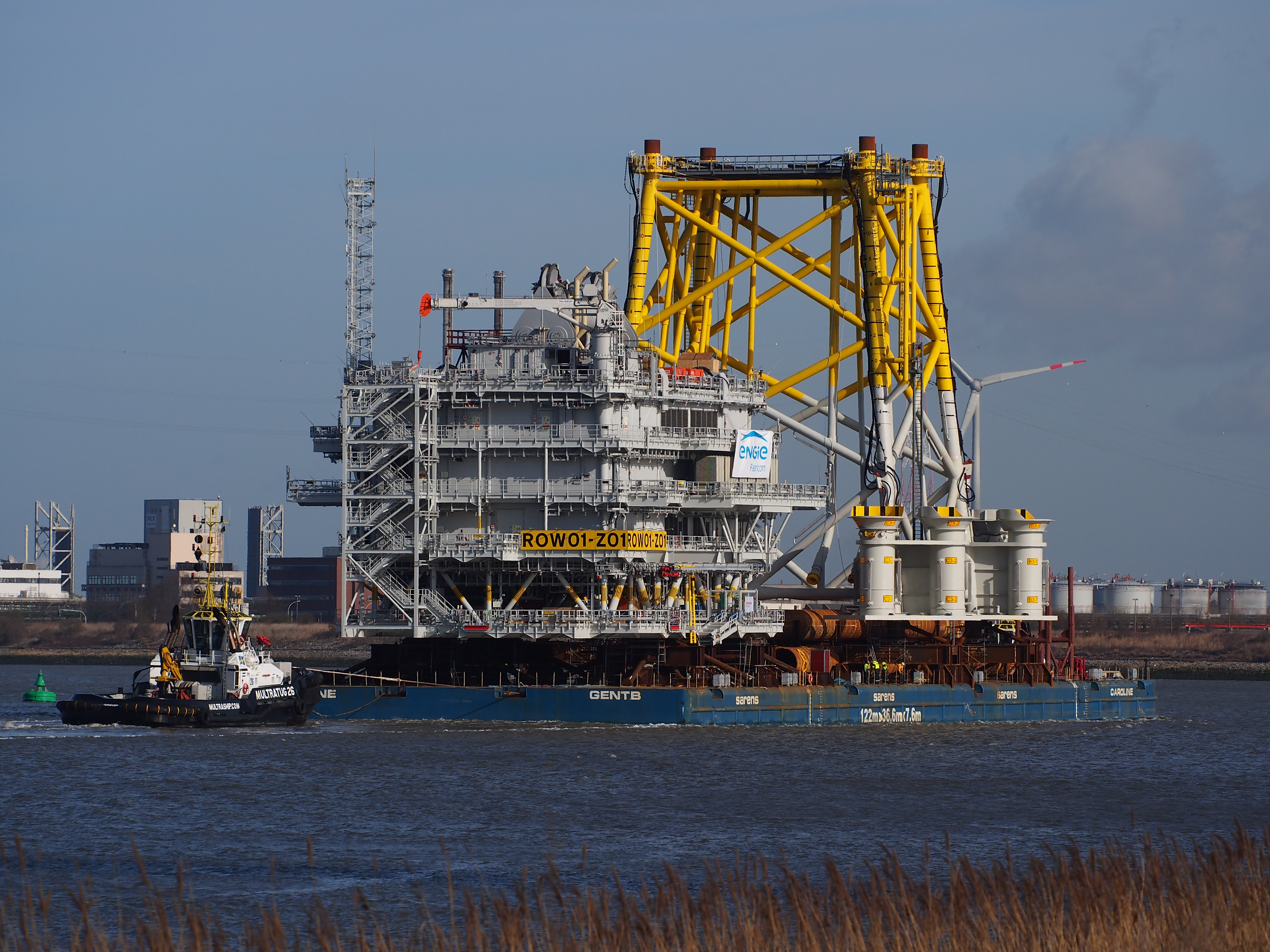
Transport of ROW01-Z01, one of the two Race Bank wind farm's substations, topside and jacket on a barge, March 2017

In late 2014 DONG Energy applied for a variation of the original (2009) planning consent, substituting two larger offshore substations for the three originally consented. The new substations were to use improved technology and export electrical power at up to 220kV AC. The new substations were to be supported on four-legged jacket foundations secured to the sea floor with pin piles; as a consequence of the change the number of export cables was to be reduced to two. The Department of Energy and Climate Change consented the changes in March 2015.

In June 2014 Dong committed to building the wind farm, which was to receive subsidies under the Renewables Obligation scheme (1.8 ROCs per MWh).

=== Construction ===
Contracts for the construction were let from 2015: Turnkey supply and installation of electrical equipment for the STATCOM for the farm was awarded to RXPE (China); NKT (Cologne) was awarded the contract for the 220kV export cables; the 36kV intra-array cabling supply was contracted to JDR (Hartlepool); steel foundations to Bilfinger subsidiary Bilfinger Mars Offshore; and an order for 91 6 MW 154 m Siemens Wind turbines was confirmed in mid-2015.

The turbines will be installed in waters of depth 6 to 26 metres (20 to 85 ft).

In July 2015 MMT was contracted to clear the cable route of possible unexploded ordnance. Over 40 Second World War bombs were located along the cable export route, which were either removed or destroyed in situ.

The first monopile foundation was installed by July 2016.

=== Operation ===
The farm was commissioned in February 2018.

== See also ==
- List of offshore wind farms
