= Birch Grove (disambiguation) =

Birch Grove is a country house in Horsted Keynes, West Sussex, England.

Birch Grove may also refer to:

- Birch Grove, Nova Scotia, Canada
- Birch Grove, a preserved LB&SCR E4 class steam locomotive
- "Birch Grove", a 2020 song by the Smashing Pumpkins from Cyr

== See also ==
- Birch Grove Estates, Alberta (disambiguation)
- Birchgrove (disambiguation)
