= Birchgrove =

Birchgrove may refer to:

== Australia ==
- Birchgrove, New South Wales, a suburb in the municipality of Leichhardt
  - Birchgrove ferry wharf
  - Birchgrove Park, a park and sports ground

== United Kingdom ==
- Birchgrove, Cardiff, a district in the city of Cardiff, Wales
  - Birchgrove railway station
- Birchgrove, Swansea, a community and large village in the city and county of Swansea, Wales
  - Birchgrove RFC, a rugby union club
- Birchgrove, West Sussex, a location in England

== See also ==
- Birch Grove (disambiguation)
