= Docking Shoal wind farm =

Cancelled offshore wind farm project

Docking Shoal Wind Farm
- Country: England, United Kingdom
- Coordinates: 53.154°N 0.753°E
- Status: Refused consent

Wind farm
- Type: Offshore

Docking Shoal Wind Farm was a proposed 500 MW offshore wind farm in the outer-Wash area of the Lincolnshire and Norfolk (UK) coastline; the wind farm was one of three Centrica was developing the area, together with Lincs wind farm and Race Bank wind farm.

An application was submitted in 2009. In 2012 the application was refused, mainly due to concerns on impact on bird wildlife.

== History ==
In 2004 Centrica was awarded a 50-year lease from The Crown Estate to develop a Round 2 wind farm on Docking Shoal.

Docking Shoal, Lincs wind farm and Race Bank wind farms were to share the same onshore cable export route, and onshore substation. The environmental statement for the onshore works was submitted as part of the Lincs Wind Farm application.

The wind farm planning consent application was submitted in December 2008. The proposed 500 MW wind farm was to be located approximately 14 kilometres (8.7 mi) north of the north Norfolk coast, and 20 kilometres (12 mi) off the Lincolnshire coast, and covered an area of approximately 75 square kilometres (29 sq mi) in water depths ranging from 3 to 14 metres (9.8 to 45.9 ft). Centrica was developing the project in association with AMEC and RES Group on this project.

In 2012 the application was refused due to environmental concerns over wildlife (Sandwich terns).
