= Triton Knoll =

Offshore wind farm in the North Sea, UK

Triton Knoll Wind Farm
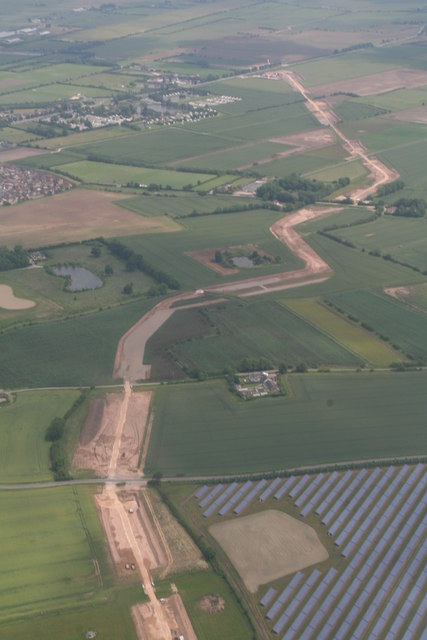
- Country: United Kingdom
- Location: North Sea, cable landfall: Anderby Creek
- Coordinates: 53°24′N 0°54′E
- Status: Operational
- Construction began: 2020
- Commission date: 3 January 2022
- Owners: J-Power; KEPCO; RWE AG

Wind farm
- Type: Offshore
- Distance from shore: 33 km (20.5 mi)
- Rotor diameter: 164 m (538 ft)

Power generation
- Units operational: 90 × 9.5 MW
- Make and model: MHI Vestas V164-9.5MW (90)
- Nameplate capacity: 857 MW

External links
- Website: www.tritonknoll.co.uk

Wind farm layout

Triton Knoll Wind Farm is an 857 MW round 2 offshore wind farm 33 kilometres (21 mi) off the coast of Lincolnshire, in the North Sea, England.

RWE Npower Renewables were awarded the lease to the development area in 2003. The offshore elements of the wind farm of up to 1200MW power gained planning consent in 2013; RWE reduced the scope of the wind farm to 900MW or under in 2014, to reduce cost per MW.

Statkraft became joint owner of the development in early 2015. The onshore and offshore electrical connection assets were given planning permission in September 2016. The Project is now owned by RWE (59%), J-Power (25%) and Kansai Electric Power (16%). Construction of the first turbine was completed in January 2021, and with the installation of substations at each end of an undersea cable, first power was announced on 1 March 2021. The final turbine of the 90 in the development was assembled on 17 September 2021, with an expected final completion in spring 2022.

== History ==
The project was initially developed by RWE Npower Renewables, who was awarded the 'Triton Knoll' development area by the Crown Estate in 2003. The original 206.9 square kilometres (79.9 sq mi) development was refined, extending north outside the original area, with the boundaries of the area defined by the avoidance of main shipping routes.

In 2008 the developer accepted an offer from National Grid for an onshore grid connection at Bicker Fen, with landfall made at Mumby. Later the connection offer was withdrawn by National Grid due to a re-assessment of their planning. By 2011 the two parties had agreed on a connection at Bicker Fen. However, due to uncertainty over the final state of the Bicker Fen substation, in 2011 the developer split the planning applications into separate offshore wind farm and electrical system applications, to minimise delay.

A planning application for the offshore elements was submitted in early 2012. The formal developer was Triton Knoll Offshore Wind Farm Ltd, a 100% subsidiary of RWE Npower Renewables -they applied for a wind farm of 135 square kilometres (52 sq mi) in size off the North Norfolk and Lincolnshire coast in the southern North Sea; the development area was cut in two by a NE/SW running pipeline channel of 500 metres (1,600 ft) width. The proposed wind farm would be of up to 1200MW capacity, with turbines foundations in water with depth of 18 to 24 metres (59 to 79 ft). The planning application included the offshore structures, but excluded the undersea export cable, and onshore electrical infrastructure.

In July 2013 the government approved the plan for a wind farm of up to 288 turbines with up to 1200MW generating capacity, with associated meteorological masts, offshore substations, (Note: In the original wind farm planning consent, The Triton Knoll Offshore Wind Farm Order 2013, explicit reference is made to the use of HVDC substations without any mention of HVAC technology, whilst in the electrical system planning application, Electrical System. Site selection 2015, §2, the developers explicitly state that HVAC was the chosen technology) and connecting cabling, with wind turbines limited to 220 metres (720 ft) tip height, 140 metres (460 ft) rotor height, and 180 metres (590 ft) rotor diameter. Additionally pile driving was not permitted during the Herring spawning season (September to mid October), without prior permission.

In January 2014 the developer RWE announced that it had chosen to progress with a reduced plan of between 600 and 900 MW power, in order to reduce the cost (per MW) of the development.

In February 2015 Statkraft acquired a 50% stake in the project. In late 2015 Statkraft announced it would no longer be investing in offshore wind, but would continue with the development at Triton Knoll.

In April 2015 the developers submitted their planning application for the electrical power export system. HVAC was identified as the preferred method of electrical power export; HVDC and mixed HVDC/HVAC systems were considered but HVDC was rejected primarily on cost grounds, with the export cable length not sufficiently long to justify a HVDC system. Overhead lines were rejected on environmental impact grounds. A landfall at or near Anderby Creek was identified as likely, An intermediate electric compound (IEC) use to regulate the reactive power of the AC cables, and a preferred site was selected to the west of Skegness Stadium. (Note: The original site of choice was deselected in early 2014 following an objection from East Lindsey District Council due to a clash with the local development plan Vision for Skegness.) A final substation site at or near Double Twelves Drove northwest of the Bicker Fen connection, and adjacent east of the South Forty Drain was shortlisted as the preferred option. Offshore and onshore export cables were to be energised at up to 220kV for a connection at Bicker Fen at 400kV.

The proposed onshore cable route consisted of around 63 kilometres (39 mi) of underground cable - a number of interested parties raised concerns about the cable route and windfarm: farmers and the NFU raised concerns about its effects on drainage; and Lincoln City Council claimed the development would have a negative effect on tourism; Lincolnshire County Council raised concerns about the combined environmental impact of the onshore link together with the 1.4 GW Viking Link electrical connector to Denmark.

The electrical grid connection including onshore and offshore cabling was given planning permission in September 2016.

The wind farm was estimated in 2015 to represent a total investment of £3-4 billion. With the scaling back of capacity and falling installation prices, the 90 turbine 857MW installation is expected (September 2021) to cost some £2 billion.

== Construction timeline ==
- 2018. Initial onshore construction started in 2018, with main construction of the substation and cable route planned for late summer 2018.
- September 2018. J Murphy and Sons began construction of the 57 kilometres (35 miles) on-shore cable route from Anderby Creek to the substation at Bicker Fen, near Boston, Lincs. Work on the substation began in early 2019, and was completed by Siemens Energy in autumn 2020. Resintatement and landscaping for the cable route and substation were finalised in spring 2021.
- January 2020: Offshore construction began with installation of the first turbine foundation on 22 January 2020 by the Seaway 7's Strashnov vessel, which, in conjunction with heavy lift vessel DEME Innovation, installed all 90 monopile 54 metre steel foundations by late August 2020.
- April 2020. Installation of the two offshore substation platforms (OSPs) designed by Siemens Energy
- June 2020. Completion and opening of the Operations and Maintenance Base in Grimsby.
- August 2020. Two 50 km cable circuits were laid from the offshore substations to the landfall at Anderby Creek, Lincolnshire. They were laid and plough-buried by the Boskalis cable-laying vessel NDurance.
- January 2021. First turbine installed. The 80 metres (260 ft) turbine blades are manufactured on the Isle of Wight by MHI-Vestas, and the turbines are manufactured at Lindø. They are brought to the construction centre at Seaton Port, near Hartlepool, by a purposebuilt cargo ship.
- March 2021. With the offshore and onshore substations completed, first power was announced on 1 March 2021.
- June 2021. Half-way point for turbine installation is reached, with 45 of the planned 90 turbines installed by 8 June, using theDEME's jack-up vessel 'Wind Osprey'.
- September 2021. 90th and final turbine was announced as having been installed, completing the 857MW array.
