= RISSP =

RISSP stands for Record of Inter System Safety Precautions . It is a written record of inter-system safety precautions to be compiled in accordance with the provisions of Operating Code no. 8 (OC8). Where a High Voltage electrical boundary occurs, for instance between a power station and electrical utility, the safety controllers each side of the boundary must co-ordinate their activities. For the electrical transmission system in England, Wales and Scotland, the Ofgem-defined industry standard document OC8 of the Grid code defines how safety precautions can be managed with the Record of Inter System Safety Precautions (RISSP) independently from the safety rules of the connected parties. The purpose of the RISSP is to guarantee that safety precautions provided by a third-party can be quoted in a safety document so that work can take place.

== Identifying number ==
The RISSP form must have a uniquely identifying number, provided by the party requesting safety precautions. To achieve this, all parties connected to the national grid must have a RISSP prefix code. These are, in general, abbreviations of the company name at the time it applied for its code. All RISSPs have the suffix 'R'. The requester states the location and equipment that requires the RISSP. The implementer then states the location and nature of the precautions provided for adequate safety of that equipment.

== Cascading RISSP ==
Some interfaces may include more than two parties, for instance on substation busbars (BB). This may require one request via a party on the BB to go via the BB controller to the other parties. It is then for the BB controller to get all required safety from other parties to cascade on to the initial requesting controller. This is sometimes referred to as a cascading RISSP. Where a third-party making a request for safety precautions controls some of the other infeeds to an interface on which safety has been requested (such as a distribution network operator who has more than one circuit on a BB, but is requesting safety for just one of those circuits) it is up to the requester themselves to control the linked safety precautions to ensure that safety from the interface. This is often referred to as linkage. It is possible to have both linkage and cascading in a single job, requiring use of RISSP forms with multiple users.

== Multiple directions ==
In addition it is possible for to request safety in multiple directions, which results in controllers having both requesting and implementing RISSPs in force simultaneously. These RISSPs may be cascading and/or linkage. It is not possible to have RISSPs going in multiple directions if HV testing is taking place across a boundary. In these circumstances only a single safety document can be in force at any one time and any RISSPs in place can only be to ensure the safety precautions for this document.

== Control boundaries ==
RISSPs do not have to be from one company to another, only one control boundary to another. Thus two distribution network operators owned by the same parent company but with different geographical areas of responsibility use RISSPs with each other. Also, the boundary between a High Voltage controller and a Low Voltage controller can be controlled by the RISSP process. This most commonly occurs with the fuses/links between an auxiliary transformer and a substation's 415 volt AC supplies.

== Authorisation ==
RISSPs can only be agreed to and signed by a suitably authorised person. Any company that is connected to the grid must have somebody authorised available or on call at all times.
