= Western HVDC Link =

HVDC transmission line in the United Kingdom

- Map of Western HVDC Link

Location
- Country: United Kingdom
- From: Hunterston, Scotland 55°43′16″N 4°53′7″W
- To: Flintshire Bridge, Wales 53°13′54″N 3°1′58″W

Ownership information
- Partners: National Grid plc ScottishPower Transmission

Construction information
- Cable manufacturer: Prysmian
- Cable installer: Prysmian
- Substation installer: Siemens
- Construction started: 2013
- Expected: March 2017
- Commissioned: November 2019 (formal handover)

Technical information
- Type: Submarine power cable
- Current type: HVDC
- Total length: 422 km (262 mi)
- Capacity: 2,250 MW
- DC voltage: 600 kV

The Western HVDC Link is a high-voltage direct current (HVDC) undersea electrical link in the United Kingdom, between Hunterston in Western Scotland and Flintshire Bridge (Connah's Quay) in North Wales, routed to the west of the Isle of Man. It has a transmission capacity of 2,250 MW and became fully operational in 2019.

== Construction ==
The project cost £1.2 billion to build. It was originally intended to enter service in 2015, and was given a deadline of 31 March 2017 by Ofgem, the industry regulator. In 2016, engineers working on the project discovered the almost intact wreck of the World War I German submarine UB-85. Completion was delayed a year due to cable manufacturing problems.

The link entered service on 7 December 2017 at a reduced capacity of 900 MW pending further work at Hunterston. Full use became available on 16 October 2018, but it did not give a full service until summer 2019, and was not formally handed over to the operator until 22 November 2019.

In November 2021, National Grid and ScottishPower agreed to pay a penalty of £158 million, after an Ofgem investigation determined these delays had increased consumer bills by limiting the amount of renewable power that could be sent from Scotland to the south of the UK. The investigation determined the delays were primarily caused by land acquisition problems, manufacturing problems, installation of cables and commissioning tests. £15 million of the penalty was paid into the regulator's redress scheme, which distributes money to charities and other organisations which help energy consumers; the rest was indirectly returned to consumers through changes to Ofgem's calculation of transmission costs in the national network.

== Description ==
The link augments the existing capacity provided by double-circuit AC transmission lines which join the Scottish and English transmission grids.

It consists of 422 km (262 miles) of cable, of which 385 km (239 miles) is under water. It is the first subsea link at 600 kV. Operating at this higher voltage increases transmission capacity and reduces transmission losses in the cable, reducing power loss from transmission and the two AC/DC conversions to under 3%. There are two cables, which in shallow water are laid in a paired bundle, and in deep water are laid about 30 m (98 ft) apart, generally buried about 1.5 m (5 ft) below the seabed. The cables are jointed in 120 km (75-mile) sections.

Line commutated converter technology is used at each HVDC converter to maximise the amount of electrical power that can be transferred, which is predominantly exported from renewable sources in Scotland. This type of HVDC conversion technology means that large filter halls are required at each converter station. Gas-insulated switchgear is used at the Hunterston converter station to save space.

Routing the connection through the Irish Sea, as opposed to a land-based route, reduced the impact of the link on the visual environment and prevented the rising cost of land affecting the cost of the project. For the given distance, it was necessary to use a DC transmission technology for a subsea route, as the capacitive current required for an AC connection would be too high. Due to the proximity of the converter stations to the coastline, a decision was taken to host electrical infrastructure within built structures in order to reduce the effects of the coastal air on the equipment.

Power can be transferred in either direction, but it is necessary for the link to be offline for a sufficient time prior to reversing the direction. Mass impregnated non-draining (MIND) cables are used in a bipolar arrangement, but no sea- or earth-return path is permitted for environmental reasons, meaning that both cables must be in service for the link to be operational. The cables are spaced apart to minimise thermal interference, but not so far as to materially impact any marine life which navigates using the magnetic field of the Earth.

== Outages ==
The link has suffered a number of outages due to cable faults, which typically take several weeks to locate and fix:

- A fault in the southern land cable on 19 February 2019 resulted in an outage until 22 March.
- A further extended outage from 6 April 2019 was caused by a fault in the undersea cable.
- A third outage commenced on 10 January 2020, leading to Ofgem investigating.
- A fourth outage lasted from 15 February to 13 March 2021.

== See also ==
- Eastern Green Links
