= Eastern Green Links =

Submarine power cables

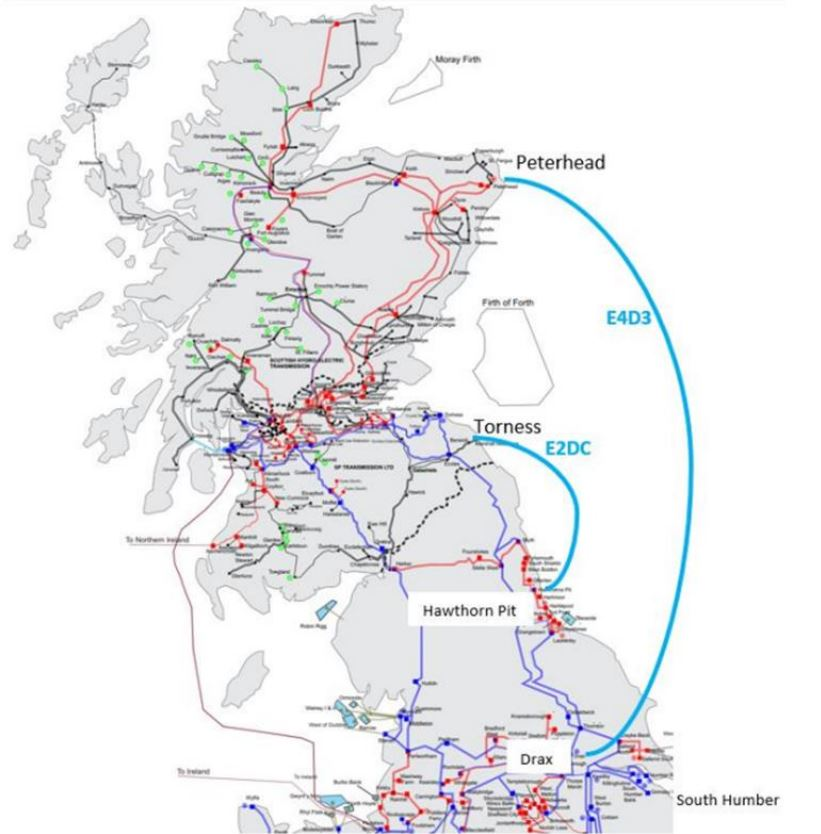
- Ofgem's schematic map of Eastern HVDC projects, 2022

Location
- Country: United Kingdom
- From: East coast of Scotland
- Passes through: North Sea
- To: Northeast England

Technical information
- Type: Submarine power cable
- Current type: HVDC
- Capacity: 2 GW (EGL1); 2 GW (EGL2)
- DC voltage: 525 kV (EGL1); 525 kV (EGL2)
- Website: easterngreenlink1.co.uk easterngreenlink2.co.uk

The Eastern Green Links are a number of planned submarine high voltage direct current power cables from the east coast of Scotland to Northeast England, designed to strengthen the National Grid. The first two links will deliver altogether 4 GW of renewable energy from Scottish wind farms to England.

Ofgem stated in 2022 that "At an estimated cost of £3.4 billion for the two links, the Eastern HVDC projects would be the largest electricity transmission investment project in the recent history of Great Britain." They approved the schemes as part of the Accelerated Strategic Transmission Investment Framework.

In July 2022, Ofgem published its conditional decision on the 'Final needs case' for the Eastern HVDC project, confirming its choice of two separate HVDC links, each rated at 2 GW.

== Overview ==
Five Eastern Green Links projects are being developed. EGL1–4 will each have a capacity of 2 GW, and run at 525 kV DC. No capacity or cable rating has been published for EGL5.

Eastern Green Link Projects
| Name | Landing site | | Transmission Owner | | Status | Target completion date |
| Name | England | Scotland | England | Scotland | Status | Target completion date |
|---|---|---|---|---|---|---|
| EGL1 | Murton, Co. Durham | Torness | National Grid Electricity Transmission Plc | Scottish Power Transmission Plc | Under construction | 2029 |
| EGL2 | Drax Power Station, Yorkshire | Peterhead, Aberdeenshire | National Grid Electricity Transmission Plc | SSEN Transmission | Under construction | 2029 |
| EGL3 | Anderby Creek, Lincolnshire | Peterhead, Aberdeenshire | National Grid Electricity Transmission Plc | SSEN Transmission | Under development | 2033 |
| EGL4 | Anderby Creek, Lincolnshire | Westfield, Fife | National Grid Electricity Transmission Plc | Scottish Power Transmission Plc | Under development | 2033-34 |
| EGL5 | Lincolnshire | Scotland (TBD) | National Grid Electricity Transmission Plc | SSEN Transmission | Proposed | 2035 |

== Scotland–England Green Link 1 (SEGL1) ==
The route of SEGL1 was chosen in 2021, subject to planning approval. The cables will run from the Torness area in southeast Scotland to Hawthorn Pit substation in Murton, County Durham. Landfall in England will be to the north of Seaham, on the Durham Coast. It is developed by Scottish Power Transmission plc (SPT) and National Grid Electricity Transmission plc (National Grid) with a budget of £1.294 billion.

In December 2022, the connection received approval from the UK energy regulator Ofgem. As of July 2024, construction was expected to run from 2025 to 2029. Construction began on 13 February 2025.

The cable will carry 2 GW. The DC voltage will be +/-525 kV, using voltage source converter (VSC) technology, carried on cross-linked polyethylene (XLPE) cables, with a fallback option of mass impregnated (MI) cables.

== Eastern Green Link 2 (EGL2) ==
The cable will run from Sandford Bay, at Peterhead in Scotland, to the Drax Power Station in Yorkshire, England. The northern converter station will be next to the existing power station at Peterhead. The subsea portion of the cable will be approximately 440 km (270 mi) long, from the Aberdeenshire coast to the East Riding of Yorkshire.

EGL2 is a joint venture between SSEN Transmission and National Grid Electricity Transmission (NGET). with a budget of £4.3 billion. It is needed to reinforce the National Grid, to "alleviate existing and future constraints on the electricity transmission network", and support new renewable electricity generation. The main contractors are Prysmian, Hitachi Energy, and BAM.

Contracts to construct the cable were finalised in February 2024. The final approvals from Ofgem came in August 2024 and construction began in September 2024. Target date for energisation was 2029.

The cable will carry 2 GW. The DC voltage will be +/-525 kV, using voltage source converter (VSC) technology, carried on cross-linked polyethylene (XLPE) cables, with a fallback option of mass impregnated (MI) cables.

== Eastern Green Link 3 & 4 ==
As part of the National Grid's Great Grid Upgrade project, Eastern Green Link 3 is proposed from Aberdeenshire to Lincolnshire, and Eastern Green Link 4 is proposed from Fife to Lincolnshire.

In December 2025, Ofgem approved two subsea grid connections linking Scottish windfarms to southern England in order to improve their utilisation. National Grid, SSE and Scottish Power will invest in the two subsea power cables – EGL3 from Peterhead and EGL4 from Westfield, Fife – which could begin operations in 2034. The southern terminal of both cables at Anderby Creek, Lincolnshire will connect to a new 75-mile (121 km) link between Grimsby and Walpole, Norfolk. Contracts for both cables were signed in early 2026.

== Further proposals ==
Eastern Green Link 5 is proposed from Lincolnshire to Scotland, with the Scottish landfall yet to be determined.

== See also ==
- Western HVDC Link
