= Robin Rigg Wind Farm =

Offshore wind farm in Scotland

Robin Rigg Offshore Wind Farm
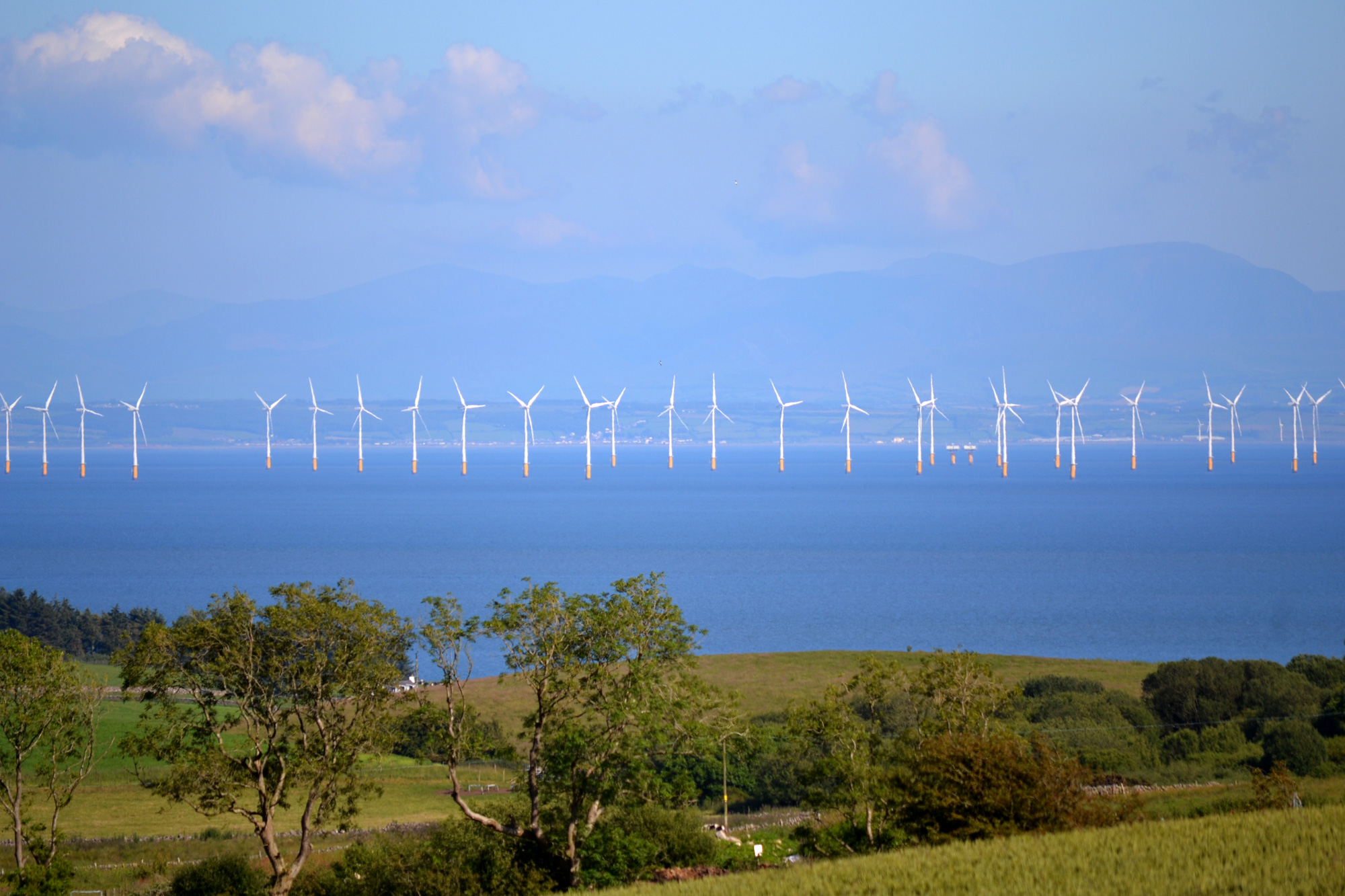
- Country: Scotland
- Location: Solway Firth, midway between the Galloway and Cumbrian coasts
- Coordinates: 54°45′N 3°43′W
- Status: Operational
- Commission date: April 2010
- Owner: E.ON

Wind farm
- Type: Offshore

Power generation
- Units operational: 58 X 3 MW
- Make and model: Vestas: V90-3MW
- Units decommissioned: 2 X 3 MW
- Nameplate capacity: 174 MW

External links
- Commons: Related media on Commons

Wind farm layout

Robin Rigg Wind Farm is Scotland's first offshore wind farm. It was constructed by E.ON at Robin Rigg, a sandbank in the Solway Firth midway between the Galloway and Cumbrian coasts. It first generated power for test purposes on 9 September 2009, and was completed on 20 April 2010.

== Description ==
60 Vestas V90-3MW wind turbines were installed, with an offshore electrical substation. Two units were subsequently decommissioned in 2015 due to failures during installation. Prysmian provided two 132 kV export cables each 12.5 km long to connect the wind farm to the on-shore substation, with landfall near Seaton, Cumbria. The 174 MW development provides enough electricity for around 117,000 households.

The wind farm employs around 40 people, most of whom are local to the area. It is operated from the Port of Workington. Local suppliers are used whenever possible, providing services including vessel management, fabrication, environmental monitoring, catering, industrial cleaning, inspection services and printing.

In the first year of commercial operation the wind farm was available to operate for over 98% of the time. Its levelised cost has been estimated at £135/MWh.

In March 2011 Robin Rigg became the first offshore wind farm to enter the OFTO regime with the two offshore and onshore export cables and the onshore 132kV substation being bought by Transmission Capital and Amber Infrastructure.

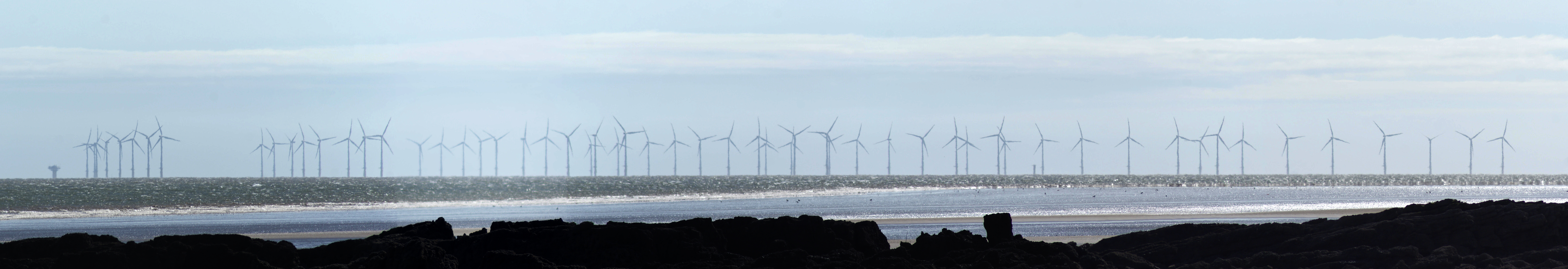
April 2017

== Project Timeline ==
- April 2010: Fully Commissioned
- 2009: Foundation Installation Completed
- 2008: First Turbine Installed
- May 2008: Two Substations Installed
- 2007: Foundation Installation Start
- 2006: Offtake Conditionally Secured
- 2001: Site Exclusivity Obtained from The Crown Estate

== Legal case ==
The wind farm was the subject of a legal case decided by the UK Supreme Court in 2017, which arose because certain of the foundation structures failed shortly after completion of the project. These had been designed and installed by Danish company MT Højgaard A/S under a contract awarded by E.ON. The case was legally significant because a requirement that the structures "be designed with a lifetime of 20 years" was contained within a Technical Requirements document which formed part of the contract, but on appeal Jackson LJ considered this requirement "too slender a thread" upon which to hang MT Hojgaard's liability in the light of other, inconsistent, parts of the specification, and because E.ON had specified a requirement that they comply with offshore standard J101, an international standard for the design of offshore wind turbine structures produced by the technical standards company DNV. The J101 standard contained a calculation error; although MT Hojgaard aimed to comply with the standard as-published, their design was not sufficiently robust to meet the 20-year lifetime requirement and so the Supreme Court found they had breached the contract.

== Licensing Information ==
- March 2024: Scottish Government, Marine Licence - Scour Protection
- January 2021: Scottish Government, Marine Licence - Potential Cable Repairs
- December 2019: Scottish Government, FEPA Licence
- December 2019: Scottish Government, Marine Licence – Removal of Turbines
- December 2019: Scottish Government, Marine Licence - Potential Cable Repairs

== See also ==
- Wind power in Scotland
- List of offshore wind farms
- List of offshore wind farms in the United Kingdom
- List of offshore wind farms in the Irish Sea
