= Anderby =

Village and civil parish in the East Lindsey district of Lincolnshire, England

Coordinates: 53.254123°N 0.283848°E

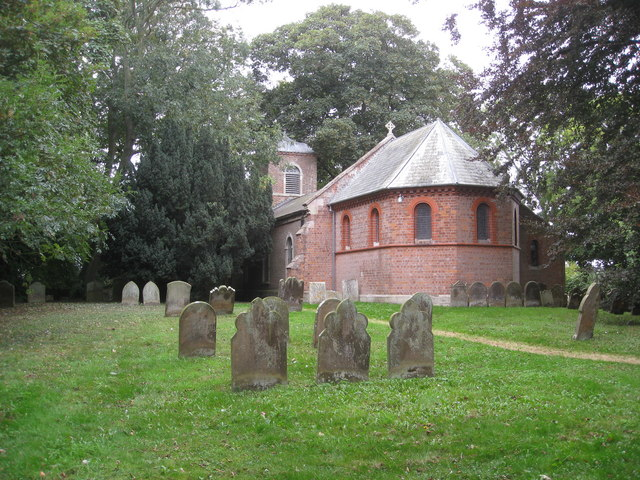
- St Andrew's Church, Anderby

- Location within Lincolnshire
- Population: 382 (2011)
- OS grid reference: TF524754
  - London: 120 mi (190 km) S
- District: East Lindsey
- Shire county: Lincolnshire
- Region: East Midlands
- Country: England
- Sovereign state: United Kingdom
- Post town: Skegness
- Postcode district: PE24
- Police: Lincolnshire
- Fire: Lincolnshire
- Ambulance: East Midlands
- UK Parliament: Boston and Skegness

Anderby is a village and civil parish in the East Lindsey district of Lincolnshire, England. It has a population of 335, according to the 2001 census. increasing to 382 at the 2011 census.

The chief parish village of Anderby consists mainly of a stretch of housing just off the main A52 road.

Anderby church is built of red brick, and is dedicated to Saint Andrew. The church is a Grade II listed building, and was built in 1759 with some 1887 restorations. In the churchyard is a 14th-century cross, which is a scheduled monument, and a Grade II listed structure.

== Anderby Creek ==
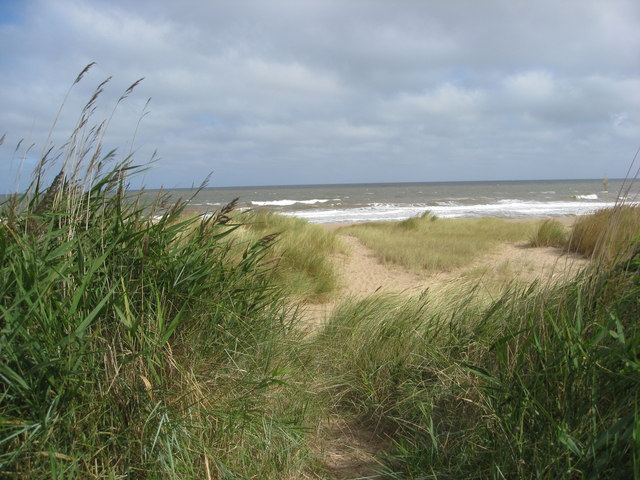
Anderby Creek

On the coast 2 miles (3.2 km) to the east is the smaller hamlet of Anderby Creek, built on the side of a creek that leads out to sea. The beach at Anderby Creek has been mentioned in the Good Beach Guide. There is a beach shop, cafe, village pub, and a few houses, and five caravan sites with access to the beach. A drainage museum is housed in a drainage board pumping station erected in 1945.

There are also two wartime defensive structures, one inside the Sunkist Caravan Park near the Creek, and one near the wooded area that separates Anderby Creek from Marsh Yard.

The Creek is protected by the council against the development of modern tourist facilities, to preserve the unspoilt status of the area.

Wolla Bank Reedbed is a nature reserve belonging to the Lincolnshire Wildlife Trust located about a mile to the south. It had originally been used as a resource for clay for the repair of the sea wall after the 1953 east-coast floods.
