= Birts Street =

Village in Worcestershire, England

Coordinates: 52.02572°N 2.31683°W

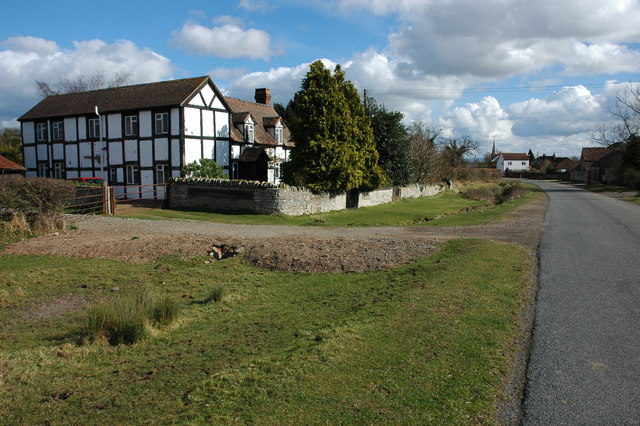

- Location within Worcestershire
- OS grid reference: SO783364
  - London: 102 miles (164 km)
- District: Malvern Hills
- Shire county: Worcestershire
- Region: West Midlands
- Country: England
- Sovereign state: United Kingdom
- Post town: MALVERN
- Postcode district: WR13
- Dialling code: 01684
- Police: West Mercia
- Fire: Hereford and Worcester
- Ambulance: West Midlands

Birts Street is a village in Worcestershire, England. It is situated within the civil parish of Birtsmorton, which recorded a population of 257 in 2021.
