= Bissom =

Coordinates: 50.1725°N 5.0944°W

Bissom: Cornish: Musyn
- Location within Cornwall
- OS grid reference: SW792348
- Civil parish: Penryn
- Unitary authority: Cornwall
- Ceremonial county: Cornwall
- Region: South West
- Country: England
- Sovereign state: United Kingdom
- Post town: PENRYN
- Postcode district: TR10
- Dialling code: 01872
- Police: Devon and Cornwall
- Fire: Cornwall
- Ambulance: South Western
- UK Parliament: Truro and Falmouth

Bissom (Cornish: Musyn) is a hamlet in south Cornwall, United Kingdom, situated half-a-mile east of Penryn.

Most of Bissom falls within the civil parish of Penryn but Bissom Farm is situated in Mylor civil parish. It is in the civil parish of Feock.
