= Bishop's Green =

Village in Hampshire, England

Coordinates: 51.365348°N 1.282205°W

Bishops Green
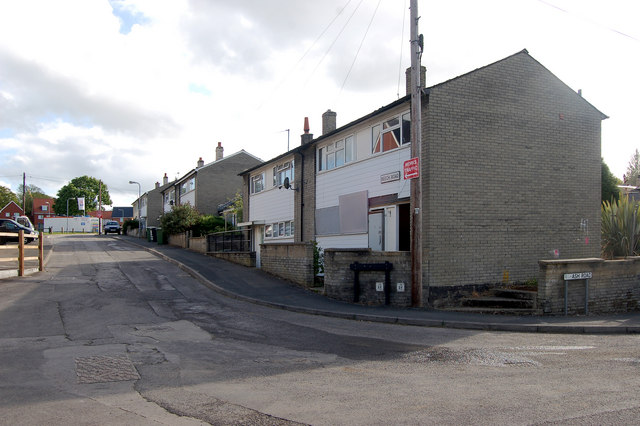
- Beech Road, Bishop's Green

- Location within Hampshire
- OS grid reference: SU500631
- District: Basingstoke and Deane
- Shire county: Hampshire
- Region: South East
- Country: England
- Sovereign state: United Kingdom
- Post town: Newbury
- Postcode district: RG20
- Dialling code: 01635
- Police: Hampshire and Isle of Wight
- Fire: Hampshire and Isle of Wight
- Ambulance: South Central
- UK Parliament: North West Hampshire

Bishops Green is a village in the English county of Hampshire, on the border with Berkshire.

== History ==
Bishops Green expanded greatly during World War II, when the original few houses and farms were joined by the Eagle Road and Ashlands housing estates, both built for the nearby American air base of RAF Greenham Common. After the war a number of Nissen huts were used to re-home local families, these being replaced by 95 new houses by Basingstoke Rural District Council in the early 1950s. At the same time the United States Air Force (USAF) built new housing alongside this development, doubling the size of the estate. The base closed in 1992 and the USAF housing was transferred to Sovereign Housing Association. The original 95 council houses were, from 1995 onwards, replaced over a period of 7 years by a new £20M development of 148 homes. The village has a shop, village hall and a camping site.

== Governance ==
Bishops Green is part of the civil parish of Ecchinswell, Sydmonton and Bishops Green. This, in turn is part of the Evingar ward of the district of Basingstoke and Deane. after reorganisation in 2021 The borough council is a non-metropolitan district of Hampshire County Council.
