= Bicker Gauntlet =

Village in Lincolnshire, England

Coordinates: 52.93°N 00.20°W

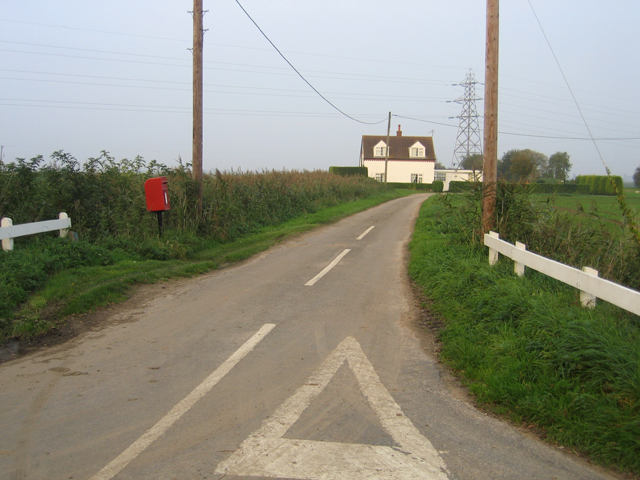
- Fore Lane, Bicker Gauntlet

- Location within Lincolnshire
- OS grid reference: TF2139
- Shire county: Lincolnshire
- Region: East Midlands
- Country: England
- Sovereign state: United Kingdom
- Post town: Boston
- Postcode district: PE20
- Police: Lincolnshire
- Fire: Lincolnshire
- Ambulance: East Midlands

Bicker Gauntlet is a village in Lincolnshire, England. It is in the civil parish of Bicker.
