= Birch Grove Estates, Alberta =

Birch Grove Estates, Alberta may refer to:

- Birch Grove Estates, Beaver County, Alberta, a locality in Beaver County, Alberta
- Birch Grove Estates, Bonnyville No. 87, Alberta, a locality in Bonnyville No. 87, Alberta
