= Bicker, Lincolnshire =

Village in Boston, Lincolnshire, England

Coordinates: 52.92457°N 0.18073°W

Bicker
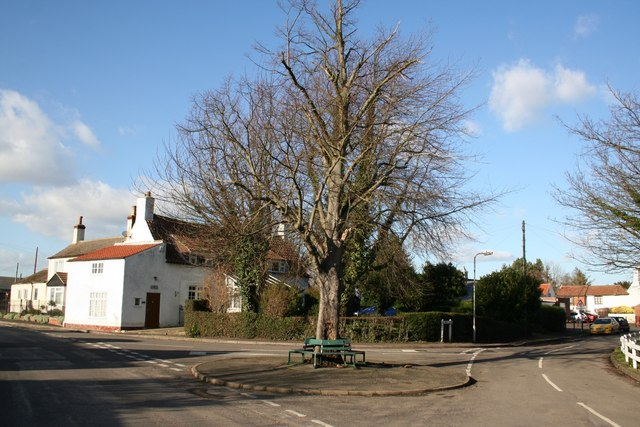

- Location within Lincolnshire
- Population: 941 (2011)
- OS grid reference: TF224379
  - London: 95 mi (153 km) S
- District: Boston
- Shire county: Lincolnshire
- Region: East Midlands
- Country: England
- Sovereign state: United Kingdom
- Post town: BOSTON
- Postcode district: PE20
- Dialling code: 01775
- Police: Lincolnshire
- Fire: Lincolnshire
- Ambulance: East Midlands
- UK Parliament: Boston and Skegness

Bicker is a village in the Borough of Boston, Lincolnshire, England. The population of the village was 941 at the 2011 census. It is situated approximately 9 miles (10 km) west-south-west from Boston, and on the A52 road.

== History ==
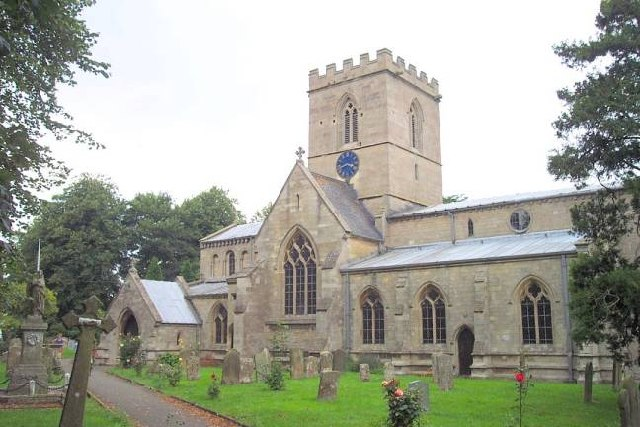
St Swithin's church

The medieval estuary, Bicker Haven, which is now a village, took its name from the town of Bicker. It originally formed the outlet of the River Witham which diverted to Boston after a flood in 1014. When the Anglo-Saxon settlers enclosed the marsh for pasture, and the tide no longer reached the haven, it silted-up, whereby Bicker ceased to be a port and became a farming village. This process had already begun with the Donington branch of the haven.

The A52 previously ran through the village, but it is now bypassed to the south. Work on the bypass started in February 1987. Lincolnshire county council built the road, with a 45 week contract, costing £1.1m. The bypass opened in late 1987.

The Bicker Bar roundabout is part of the Swineshead bypass which opened in 1985.

== Geography ==
Bicker is one of 18 parishes which, together with Boston, form the Borough of Boston in the county of Lincolnshire, England. The local government has been arranged in this way since the reorganization of 1 April 1974, which resulted from the Local Government Act 1972. This parish forms part of the Five Villages Ward of Boston Borough Council and part of the Boston Rural Electoral Division of Lincolnshire County Council.

Hitherto, the parish had formed part of Boston Rural District, in the Parts of Holland. Holland was one of the three divisions (formally known as parts) of the traditional county of Lincolnshire. Since the Local Government Act 1888, Holland had been in most respects, a county in itself.

The civil parish has an area of around 3,800 acres (15 km^{2}), and includes the hamlet of Hoffleet Stow.

Mill Lane (B1181) joins the bypass to the A17. Bicker and Donington lie either side of the South Holland and Borough of Boston boundary. The boundary follows to the south of the B1181, north of Donington Eaudike. To the west is North Kesteven on the other side of the South Forty-Foot Drain.

The boundary with South Holland at Donington follows the Old Eau to the south-east, passing the northern edge of Rabbit Hills Farm. To the south it meets the parish of Wigtoft. It passes to the west of the A17/B1181 junction at Bank House, named after the former sea bank of Bicker Haven. It follows the A17 to the west, and meets Swineshead at Bolle Hall, following the west of the A17. About 110 yards (100 m) of the A17 is in the parish, including the Bicker Bar roundabout at the A52, and the Bicker Bar motel and Texaco services. The boundary with Swineshead follows to the north-west along a drain south of East Low Grounds, and includes Bicker Gauntlet. It follows North Drove to the north, along Bicker Fen, south of West Low Grounds. At Holt Hills it meets North Kesteven and borders Great Hale for about 330 yards (300 m), then at Ferry Farm borders Little Hale. Near Eau End Farm (on the other side of the drain), it meets South Holland om Middle Fen then passes close to the line of the pylons on North Fen. The OS Explorer map for the district shows 'The Bars', an off-road area to the north of the village of Bicker at TF230384 (What 3 Words, stammer.position.twirls) The origin of the name is unknown, but may relate to a limnological point bar, of which there were several in the district centuries ago.

== Community ==
The Ye Olde Red Lion public house is on Donington Road. The village has a post office with a shop, and a parish church dedicated to St Swithin.

North of the main line of 400 kV pylons is the Bicker Fen windfarm consisting of 13 turbines producing 26 MW (2 MW each), enough for 14,000 homes. The construction of the windfarm met some local objection. The windmills sit north from Poplartree Farm and were built in June 2008 by Wind Prospect for EdF. They are of the type REpower MM82, made in Hamburg. Bicker Fen substation is also the landing site for a 1,400 MW power cable from Denmark called Viking Link, as well as the proposed offshore wind farm Triton Knoll. Archaeological excavations carried out there in advance of construction revealed two distinctly different enclosure systems (on a raised roddon) were uncovered at Bicker Fen. A series of interlinked enclosures were part of a Roman mid-2nd century AD farmstead which had an economic focus on beef production. A later, more seasonal, Saxon field system dated to 6th and 10th centuries whose focus appears to have been pastoralism and was suggestive of seasonal or otherwise ad hoc land use away from the core of any nearby settlement.

=== Population ===
Year	Population
1801	485
1811	541
1821	644
1831	712
1841	859
1851	819
1881	723
1891	661
1901	668
1911	664
1921	674
1931	730
1941	N/A (World War II)
1951	799
1961	552
2001	826
2011	941
