= Bickingcott =

Hamlet in Devon, England

Coordinates: 51.04621°N 3.74047°W

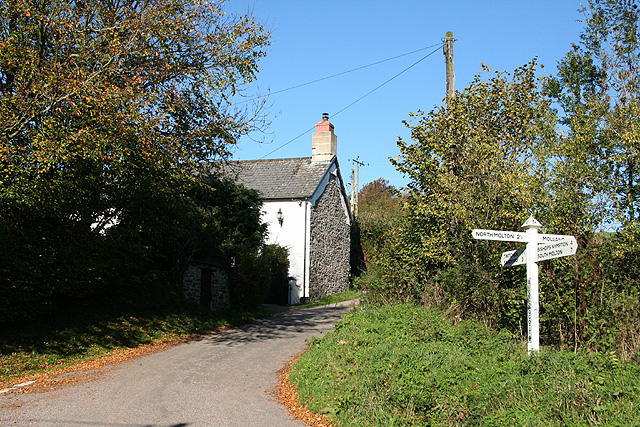
- Twitchen, Bickingcott Cross

- Location within Devon
- OS grid reference: SS7728
- Shire county: Devon
- Region: South West
- Country: England
- Sovereign state: United Kingdom
- Police: Devon and Cornwall
- Fire: Devon and Somerset
- Ambulance: South Western

Bickingcott is a hamlet in Devon, England.
