= National Grid (Great Britain) =

High-voltage electric power transmission network in Great Britain

Map of the National Grid

The National Grid is the high-voltage electric power transmission network supporting Great Britain's electricity market, connecting power stations and major substations, and ensuring that electricity generated anywhere on the grid can be used to satisfy demand elsewhere. The network serves the majority of Great Britain and some of the surrounding islands. It does not cover Northern Ireland, which is part of the Irish single electricity market.

The National Grid is a wide area synchronous grid operating at 50 Hz and consisting of 400 kV and 275 kV lines, as well as 132 kV lines in Scotland. It has several undersea interconnectors: an AC connector to the Isle of Man, and HVDC connections to Northern Ireland, the Shetland Islands, the Republic of Ireland, France, Belgium, the Netherlands, Norway, and Denmark.

== Ownership ==
Since the privatisation of the Central Electricity Generating Board in 1990, the grid in England and Wales is owned by National Grid Electricity Transmission. In Scotland the grid is owned by ScottishPower Transmission in the south, and by SSE in the north. Infrastructure connecting offshore wind farms to the grid is owned by offshore transmission owners.

National Grid Electricity Transmission is the transmission system operator, responsible for operating the grid across the whole of Great Britain, while the government-owned National Energy System Operator (NESO) is responsible for managing the electricity market and balancing supply and demand.

== History ==
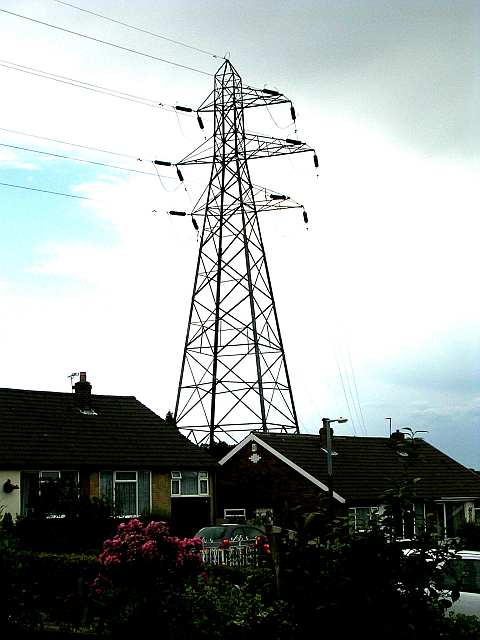
Electricity pylons in a suburban area of Pudsey, West Yorkshire

=== Background ===
At the end of the 19th century, Nikola Tesla established the principles of three-phase high-voltage electric power distribution while he was working for Westinghouse in the United States. The first use of this system in the United Kingdom was by Charles Merz, of the Merz & McLellan consulting partnership, at his Neptune Bank Power Station near Newcastle upon Tyne. This opened in 1901, and by 1912 had developed into the largest integrated power system in Europe. The rest of the country, however, continued to use a patchwork of small supply networks.

=== Creation of the grid ===
In 1925, the British government asked Lord Weir, a Glaswegian industrialist, to solve the problem of Britain's inefficient and fragmented electricity supply industry. Weir consulted Merz, and the result was the Electricity (Supply) Act 1926, which recommended that a "national gridiron" supply system be created. The 1926 act created the Central Electricity Board, which set up the UK's first synchronised, nationwide AC grid, running at 132 kV, 50 Hz.

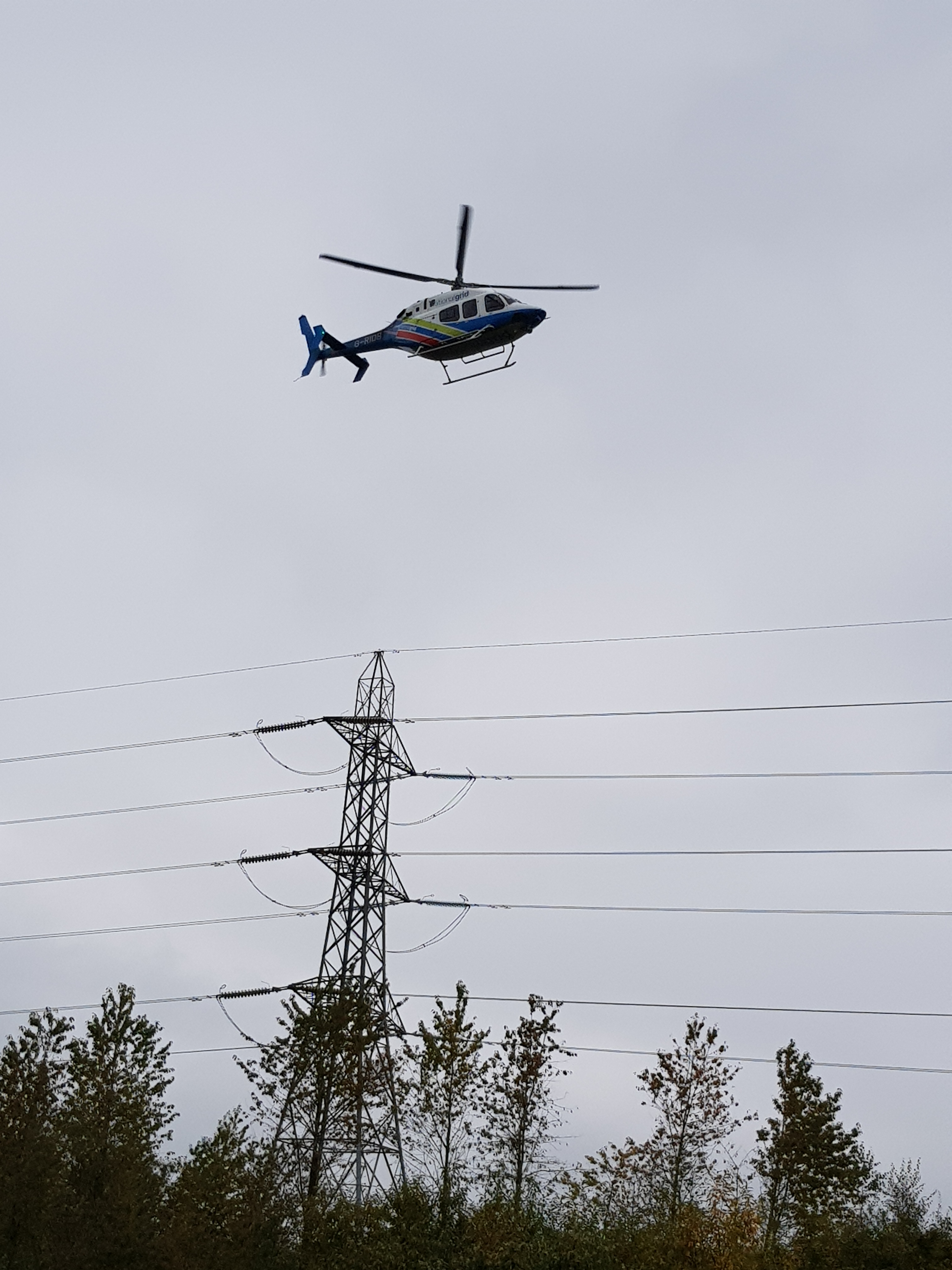
National Grid helicopter inspecting overhead cables in Greater Manchester

The grid was created with 6,400 kilometres (4,000 miles) of cables – mostly overhead – linking the 122 most efficient power stations. The first "grid tower" was erected near Edinburgh on 14 July 1928, and work was completed in September 1933, ahead of schedule and on budget. It began operating in 1933 as a series of regional grids with auxiliary interconnections for emergency use. Following the unauthorised but successful short term parallelling of all regional grids by the night-time engineers on 29 October 1937, by 1938 the grid was operating as a national system. The growth by then in the number of electricity users was the fastest in the world, rising from three quarters of a million in 1920 to nine million in 1938. The grid proved its worth during the Blitz, when South Wales provided power to replace lost output from Battersea and Fulham power stations. The grid was nationalised by the Electricity Act 1947, which also created the British Electricity Authority.

=== Expansion ===
In 1949, the British Electricity Authority decided to upgrade the grid by adding 275 kV links. At its inception in 1950, the 275 kV Transmission System was designed to form part of a national supply system with an anticipated total demand of 30,000 MW by 1970. The predicted demand was already exceeded by 1960. This rapid growth led the Central Electricity Generating Board (created in 1958) to carry out a study in 1960 of future transmission needs.

Considered in the study, together with the increased demand, was the effect on the transmission system of the rapid advances in generator design resulting in projected power stations of 2,000–3,000 MW installed capacity. These new stations were mostly to be sited where advantage could be taken of a surplus of cheap low-grade fuel and adequate supplies of cooling water, but these sites did not coincide with the load centres. West Burton's 4 × 500 MW machines, in the Nottinghamshire coalfield near the River Trent, is an example. These developments shifted the emphasis on the transmission system from interconnection to bulk power transfers from the generation areas to the load centres, such as the anticipated transfer in 1970 of some 6,000 MW from the Midlands to the home counties.

Continued reinforcement and extension of the 275 kV systems was examined as a possible solution. However, in addition to the technical problem of high fault levels, many more lines would have been required to obtain the estimated transfers at 275 kV. As this was not consistent with the Central Electricity Generating Board's policy of preservation of amenities, a better solution was sought. Consideration was given to 400 kV and 500 kV schemes: both gave a sufficient margin for future expansion. The decision in favour of a 400 kV system was made for two main reasons. Firstly the majority of the 275 kV lines could be uprated to 400 kV, and secondly it was envisaged that operation at 400 kV could begin in 1965 compared with 1968 for a 500 kV scheme. Design work was started and in order to meet the programme for 1965 it was necessary for the contract engineering for the first projects to run concurrently with the design. One of these projects was the West Burton 400 kV indoor substation, the first section of which was commissioned in June 1965. From 1965, the grid was partly upgraded to 400 kV, beginning with a 150-mile (240 km) line from Sundon to West Burton, to become the Supergrid.

In the 2010 issue of the code that governs the National Grid, the Grid Code, the Supergrid is defined as those parts of the British electricity transmission system that are connected at voltages in excess of 200 kV.

The 2.2 GW undersea Western HVDC Link from Scotland to North Wales was built in 2013–2018. This was the first major non-alternating current grid link within Great Britain, although interconnectors to foreign grids already used HVDC.

=== 2020s onward ===
In the 2020s National Grid announced the Great Grid Upgrade, a series of 17 projects to increase the capacity of the grid to receive supply from offshore sources and to meet increasing demand, such as that from electric cars.

In 2021 a new non-lattice design of electricity pylon, the T-pylon, was built near East Huntspill, Somerset for the new 35-mile Hinkley Point C to Avonmouth connection. In 2023, National Grid began removing equipment made by China's NARI Technology over national security concerns.

In 2024, the Department for Energy Security and Net Zero established the publicly owned NESO to acquire the electricity system operator license from National Grid plc. National Grid remains the transmission system operator.

In December 2025, Ofgem approved two subsea grid connections linking Scottish windfarms to southern England in order to improve their utilisation. National Grid, SSE and Scottish Power will invest in the two Eastern Green Links subsea power cables – EGL3 from Peterhead and EGL4 from Westfield, Fife – which could begin operations in 2034. The southern terminal of both cables at Anderby Creek, Lincolnshire will connect to a new 75-mile (121 km) link between Grimsby and Walpole, Norfolk.

== Characteristics of the grid ==
UK electricity production by source 1985–2020

Electricity supplied (net) 1920 to 2024

External images
- Current grid status, maps
- Current grid status, charts

The contiguous synchronous grid covers England (including the Isle of Wight), Scotland (including some of the Scottish islands such as Orkney, Skye and the Western Isles which have limited connectivity), Wales, and the Isle of Man.

=== Network size ===
The following figures are taken from the 2005 Seven Year Statement.

- Maximum demand (2005/6): 63 GW (approx.) (81.39% of capacity)
- Minimum demand (2020 May): 15.3 GW
- Annual electrical energy used in the UK is around 360 TWh (1.3 EJ)
- Capacity (2005/6): 79.9 GW (or 80 GW per the 2008 Seven Year Statement)
- Number of large power stations connected to it: 181
- Length of 400 kV grid: 11,500 km (circuit)
- Length of 275 kV grid: 9,800 km (circuit)
- Length of 132 kV (or lower) grid; 5,250 km (circuit)

Total generating capacity is supplied roughly equally by renewable, gas fired, nuclear, coal fired power stations. Annual energy transmitted in the UK grid is around 300–360 TWh (1.1–1.3 EJ), with an average load factor of 72% (i.e. 3.6×10^{11}/(8,760 × 57×10^{6}).

=== Decarbonisation ===
Decarbonisation plans in 2020 from the UK government and National Grid initially set a stretch target to be carbon neutral or negative by 2033, earlier than the UK's national target to achieve this by 2050. National Grid also aimed to have the capability to be 'zero carbon' as early as 2025, meaning that if energy suppliers are able to produce sufficient green power, the grid could theoretically run without any greenhouse gas emissions at all (i.e. no carbon capture or offsetting would be needed as is the case with 'net zero'). In 2020, about 40% of the grid's energy came from burning natural gas, and it was not expected that anywhere close to sufficient green power would be available to run the grid on zero carbon in 2025, except perhaps on the very windiest days. Analysts such as Hartree Solutions considered in 2020 that getting to 'net zero' by 2050 would be challenging, even more so to reach 'net zero' by 2033.

There has been sustained progress towards carbon neutrality, with carbon intensity falling by 53% in the five years to 2020. The phase-out of coal has been completed: in 2020, only 1.6% of the UK's electricity came from coal, compared with about 25% in 2015. 2020 also saw the UK go more than two months without needing to burn any coal for electricity, the longest period since the Industrial Revolution. On 30 September 2024, on the closure of the last coal-fired power station, UK electricity became coal-free.

In July 2024, The Royal Academy of Engineering released a report into the progress of National Grid's decarbonisation strategy. The report "Rapid Decarbonisation of the GB Electricity System" stated the government’s mission to provide clean power by 2030 sharply raises the level of ambition from an already challenging 2035 target. A revised strategy in 2024 meant that the UK government now aimed to reach this goal by 2030, advancing from the original target of 2035. This change in delivery date was made possible by recent infrastructure investments, and a proposed £77 billion to enhance the electricity transmission network between 2026 and 2031. Months prior to this, an announcement was made about the creation of Great British Energy, a government-backed renewable energy firm. Its creation, and projects that it would have a minority stake in, would play a large role in reaching the government's 2030 target. Investments of £8.3 billion were planned by GBE in offshore wind, hydrogen power, carbon capture and nuclear power developments before 2030.

The 2030 decarbonisation target has also been made possible by the scaling of capacity in offshore wind, while onshore wind and solar sites have been identified to increase the usage of those sites. Public information programs and campaigns have been introduced to try and change user habits in electricity consumption, which can mean using large sources of power outside peak hours. Reductions in the costs of electric vehicle charging overnight is one such scheme that had large take-up in 2024.

Despite progress, there are still some challenges that remain to achieve carbon neutrality by 2035 and net zero by 2050. Development and the installation of transmission energy infrastructure is essential to achieving these goals. System flexibility is a concern: for example, solar is less effective during long periods of heavy rain, thus other green energy solutions are needed to meet the demand. Should clean energy fail to achieve this flexibility, the British media suggested blackouts could be possible, although the Daily Telegraph stated in January 2025 that large-scale blackouts remain unlikely. Regulatory reforms and energy storage innovations would also play a major role in ensuring clean energy always provides the grid with enough power.

=== Losses ===
Figures are again from the 2005 Seven Year Statement.

- Joule heating in cables: 857.8 MW
- Fixed losses: 266 MW (consists of corona and iron loss; can be 100 MW higher in adverse weather)
- Substation transformer heating losses: 142.4 MW
- Generator transformer heating losses: 157.3 MW
- Total losses: 1,423.5 MW (2.29% of peak demand)

Although overall losses in the National Grid are low, there are significant further losses in onward electricity distribution to the consumer, causing a total distribution loss of 8.7% in 2003. Losses differ significantly for customers connected at different voltages; connected at high voltage the total losses are about 2.6%, at medium voltage 6.4% and at low voltage 12.2%.

Generated power entering the grid is metered at the high-voltage side of the generator transformer. Any power losses in the generator transformer are therefore accounted to the generating company, not to the grid system. The power loss in the generator transformer does not contribute to the grid losses.

=== Power flow ===
In 2009–10 there was an average power flow of about 11 GW from the north of the UK, particularly from Scotland and northern England, to the south of the UK across the grid. This flow was anticipated to grow to about 12 GW by 2014. Completion of the Western HVDC Link in 2018 added capacity for a flow of 2.2 GW between Western Scotland and North Wales.

Because of the power loss associated with this north to south flow, the effectiveness and efficiency of new generation capacity is significantly affected by its location. For example, new generating capacity on the south coast has about 12% greater effectiveness due to reduced transmission system power losses compared to new generating capacity in north England, and about 20% greater effectiveness than in northern Scotland.

=== Interconnectors ===
Existing links Under construction Proposed Some of these HVDC lines transfer power from renewable sources such as hydro and wind. For names, see also the annotated version.

There is a 40 MW AC cable to the Isle of Man, and a 260 km 600 MW HVDC cable to the Shetland Islands.

The UK grid is connected to adjacent European electrical grids by submarine power cables.

In 2014, the UK's electricity interconnection level (off-island transmission capacity relative to production capacity) was 6%.

As of 2024, the total capacity of these connectors is over 10 GW. They include direct-current cables to northern France (2 GW HVDC Cross-Channel, 1 GW HVDC IFA-2, 1 GW ElecLink via the Channel Tunnel); Belgium (1 GW HVDC Nemo Link); the Netherlands (1 GW HVDC BritNed); Norway (1.4 GW HDVC North Sea Link); Northern Ireland (500 MW HVDC Moyle Interconnector); the Republic of Ireland (500 MW HVDC East–West Interconnector), and Denmark (1.4 GW Viking Link).

A new 500 MW link with the Republic of Ireland (Greenlink) became operational on 29 January 2025.

Further potential schemes include links with Germany (NeuConnect, 1.4 GW); Iceland (Icelink, around 1 GW) and Morocco (3.6 GW from new battery-backed solar generation).

=== Grid storage ===
The UK grid has access to large pumped storage systems, notably Dinorwig Power Station which can provide 1.7 GW for 5–6 hours, and the smaller Cruachan and Ffestiniog.

There are also some grid batteries. As of May 2021, 1.3 GW of battery storage was operating in the United Kingdom, with 16 GW of projects in the pipeline potentially deployable over the next few years. A 100 MW power Chinese-financed plant at Minety, Wiltshire was reported to be the largest in Europe when it opened in July 2021; when a 50 MW extension is completed, the site's storage capacity will be 266 MWh. By July 2026, nearly 7 GW of grid battery capacity had been installed.

=== Reserve services and frequency response ===
National Grid is responsible for contracting short term generating provision to cover demand prediction errors and sudden failures at power stations. This covers a few hours of operation giving time for market contracts to be established to cover longer term balancing.

The grid frequency is normally maintained within 49.8 and 50.2 Hz. Frequency-response reserves act to keep the system's AC frequency within ±1% of 50 Hz, except in exceptional circumstances. These are used on a second by second basis to either lower the demand or to provide extra generation. In an emergency where the discrepancy between supply and demand is too great and the frequency drops too far (between 48.8 Hz down to 47.8 Hz) then the Low Frequency Demand Disconnection (LFDD) automatic cutouts progressively trigger and remove up to 60% of the customer load from the Supergrid to avoid blacking out the entire grid.

Reserve services are a group of services each acting within different response times:

- Fast Reserve: rapid delivery (within two minutes) of increased generation or reduced demand, sustainable for a minimum of 15 minutes.
- Fast Start: generation units that start from a standstill and deliver power within five minutes automatically, or within seven minutes of a manual instruction, with generation maintained for a minimum of four hours.
- Demand Management: reduction in demand of at least 25 MW from large power users, for at least an hour.
- Short Term Operating Reserve (STOR): generation of at least 3 MW, from a single or aggregation of sites, within four hours of instruction and maintained for at least two hours.
- BM Start-Up: mainstream major generation units maintained in either an energy readiness or hot standby state.

These reserves are sized according to three factors:

- The largest credible single generation failure event, which is currently either Sizewell B nuclear power station (1,260 MW) or one cable of the HVDC Cross-Channel interconnector (1,000 MW)
- The general anticipated availability of all generation plants
- Anticipated demand prediction errors

== Control of the grid ==
Although the transmission network is owned by separate companies, operational control rests with National Grid Electricity Transmission, who operate the grid across Great Britain from the Transmission Network Control Centre in Warwick.

== Transmission costs ==
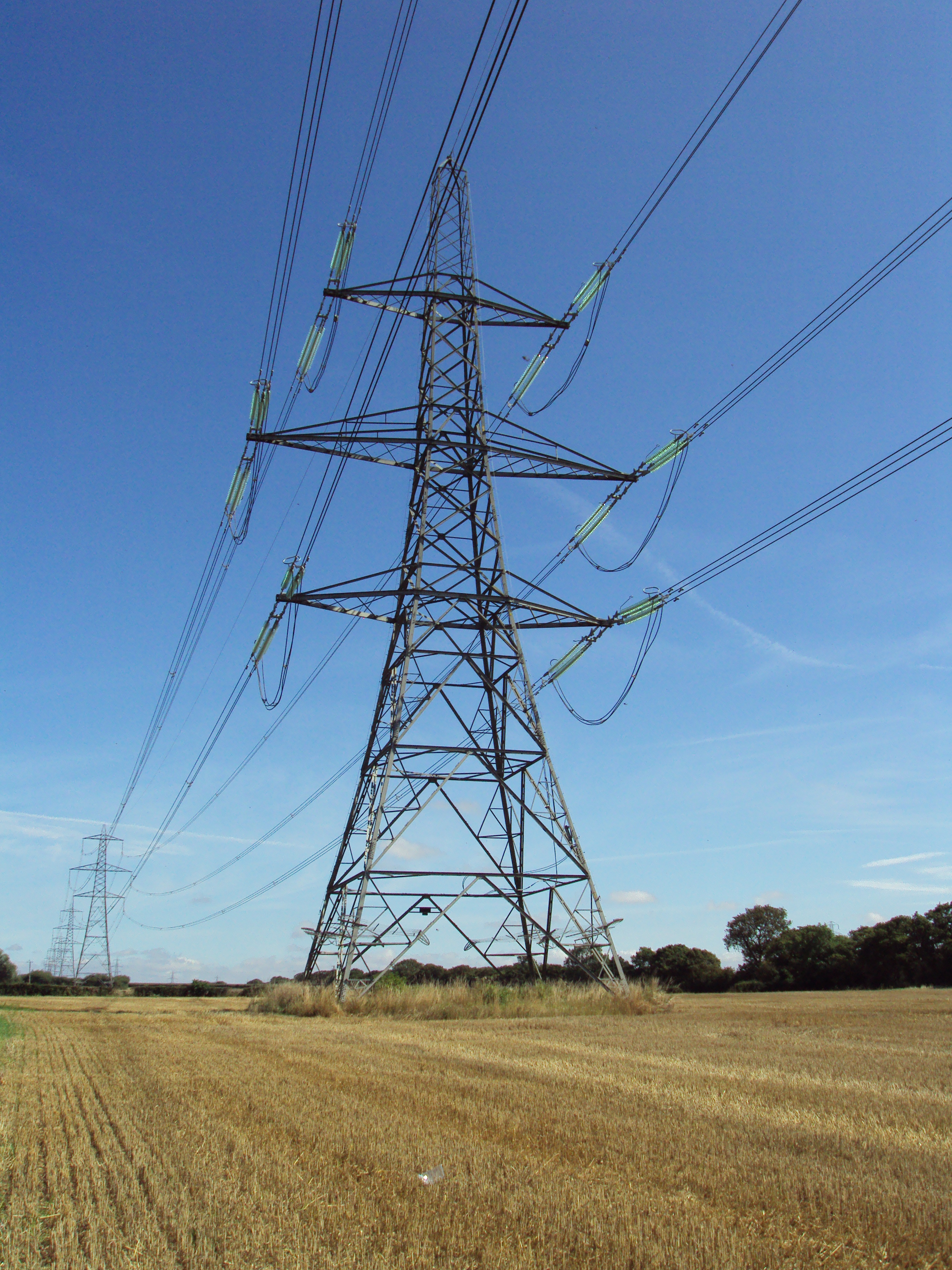
400 kV power line in Cheshire

The costs of operating the National Grid System are recouped by National Grid Electricity System Operator (NGESO) through levying of Transmission Network Use of System (TNUoS) charges on the users of the system. The costs are split between the generators and the users of electricity.

Tariffs are set annually by NGESO, and the country is divided into zones, each with a different tariff for generation and consumption. In general, tariffs are higher for generators in the north and consumers in the south since there is generally a north–south flow of electricity.

=== Triad demand ===
'Triad demand' is a metric of demand which reports retrospectively three numbers about peak demand between November and February (inclusive) each winter. In order to encourage usage of the National Grid to be less 'peaky', the triad is used as the basis for extra charges paid by the users (the licensed electricity suppliers) to the National Grid: the users pay less if they can manage their usage so as to be less peaky.

For each year's calculation, historic system demand metrics are analysed to determine three half-hour periods of high average demand; the three periods are known as triads. The periods are (a) the period of peak system demand, and (b) two other periods of highest demand which are separated from peak system demand and from each other by at least ten days.

For power stations, the chargeable demand is only the net site demand (per CUSC rule 14.17.10), so when the site is net exporting (i.e. total metered generation at that site exceeds total separately metered station demand), that separately metered station demand shall not be liable for demand TNUoS charges in relation to the station demand at triad.

Triad dates in recent years were:

Year	Triad 1	Triad 2	Triad 3
2015/16	Wednesday 25 November 2015, 17:00 – 17:30	Tuesday 19 January 2016, 17:00–17:30	Monday 15 February 2016, 18:00–18:30
2016/17	Monday 5 December 2016, 17:00 – 17:30	Thursday 5 January 2017, 17:00 – 17:30	Monday 23 January 2017, 17:00 – 17:30
2017/18	Monday 11 December 2017, 17:30 – 18:00	Monday 26 February 2018, 18:30–19:00	Monday 5 February 2018, 18:00–18:30
2018/19			
2019/20			
2020/21	Monday 7 December 2020, 17:00 – 17:30	Thursday 7 January 2021, 17:30 – 18:00	Wednesday 10 February 2021, 18:00 – 18:30

This is the main source of income which National Grid uses to cover its costs for high-voltage long-distance transmission (lower voltage distribution is charged separately). The grid also charges an annual fee to cover the cost of generators, distribution networks and large industrial users connecting.

Triad charges encourage users to cut load at peak periods; this is often achieved by using diesel generators. Such generators are also routinely used by National Grid.

=== Estimating costs per kW⋅h of transmission ===
If the total TNUoS or Triad receipts (say £15,000/MW·year × 50,000 MW = £750 million/year) is divided by the total number of units delivered by the UK generating system in a year (the total number of units sold – say 360 terawatt-hours (1.3 EJ).), then a crude estimate can be made of transmission costs, and one gets the figure of around 0.2p/kW⋅h. Other estimates also give a figure of 0.2p/kW⋅h.

However, Bernard Quigg notes: "According to the 06/07 annual accounts for NGC UK transmission, NGC carried 350TW⋅h for an income of £2012m in 2007, i. e. NGC receives 0.66p per kW hour. With two years inflation to 2008/9, say 0.71p per kW⋅h.", but this also includes generators' connection fees.

=== Generation charges ===
In order to be allowed to supply electricity to the transmission system, generators must be licensed (by BEIS) and enter into a connection agreement with NGET which also grants Transmission Entry Capacity (TEC). Generators contribute to the costs of running the system by paying for TEC, at the generation TNUoS tariffs set by NGET. This is charged on a maximum-capacity basis. In other words, a generator with 100 MW of TEC who only generated at a maximum rate of 75 MW during the year would still be charged for the full 100 MW of TEC.

In some cases, there are negative TNUoS tariffs. These generators are paid an amount based on their peak net supply over three proving runs over the course of the year. This represents the reduction in costs caused by having a generator close to the centre of demand of the country.

National Grid uses a grid services market. "Dynamic Containment" started in October 2020, initially priced at £17 per MW per hour, and Dynamic Regulation (DR) started in April 2022.

=== Demand charges ===
Consumers of electricity are split into two categories: half-hourly metered (HH) and non-half-hourly metered (NHH). Customers whose peak demand is sufficiently high are obliged to have a HH meter, which, in effect, takes a meter reading every 30 minutes. The rates at which charges are levied on these customers' electricity suppliers therefore varies 17,520 times a (non-leap) year.

The TNUoS charges for a HH metered customer are based on their demand during three half-hour periods of greatest demand between November and February, known as the Triad. Due to the nature of electricity demand in the UK, the three Triad periods always fall in the early evening, and must be separated by at least ten clear working days. The TNUoS charges for a HH customer are simply their average demand during the triad periods multiplied by the tariff for their zone. Therefore, (as of 2007) a customer in London with a 1 MW average demand during the three triad periods would pay £19,430 in TNUoS charges.

TNUoS charges levied on NHH metered customers are much simpler. A supplier is charged for the sum of their total consumption between 16:00 and 19:00 every day over a year, multiplied by the relevant tariff.

=== Constraint payments ===
Constraint payments are payments to generators above a certain size, where the National Grid gives them dispatch instructions that they are unable to take the electricity that the generators would normally provide. This can be due to a lack of transmission capacity, a shortfall in demand, or unexpected excess generation. A constraint payment is recompense for the reduction in generation.

== Major incidents ==
Power cuts due to faults in the national grid, or lack of generation to supply it with sufficient power, are rare. The overall performance of the system is published on National Grid's website and includes a simple high-level figure for the transmission system availability. For 2021–22, this was 99.999612%.

In 2020–21, issues affecting the low voltage distribution networks – for which National Grid is not responsible – caused almost all the 60 minutes or so per year, on average, of unplanned domestic power cuts.

Since 1990, there have been a small number of prominent power outages which were linked to National Grid:

=== August 2003 ===
In the early evening of 28 August 2003, a power cut affected 476,000 customers in the south London area, as well as the London Underground and some rail services, for approximately 40 minutes. A total of 724 MW of load was lost.

An oil leak in a transformer had been left untreated, except for top-ups, for many months, pending a proper fix. This caused an alarm which was misinterpreted by the National Grid control room. While switching the presumed faulty equipment out, an incorrectly sized protection relay installed several years prior caused a circuit breaker to trip, resulting in the loss of supply to two major south London substations.

=== September 2003 ===
A week after the London blackout, on 5 September 2003, an incident occurred at Hams Hall substation which affected supply to 201,000 customers in east Birmingham. Affected customers included Network Rail, Birmingham International Airport, and the National Exhibition Centre, with a total of 301 MW of load lost. This was attributed to an error made by National Grid when commissioning protection systems after upgrading components in the substation that August.

=== May 2008 ===
On 27 May 2008 starting at 11:34, two of Britain's largest power stations, Longannet in Fife and Sizewell B in Suffolk, disconnected from the grid ("tripped") within minutes of each other. The total combined loss of generation caused by these trips was at least 1714 MW – larger than the maximum loss of 1260 MW which the grid was required to support that day.

The system frequency immediately dropped to 49.2 Hz, and subsequent additional trips of generation due to automatic protection caused the frequency to fall further to a low of 48.8 Hz. This caused the distribution networks to automatically disconnect some customers in order to arrest the frequency drop, and over the next few hours National Grid ordered the distribution networks to reduce voltage in order to reduce demand. At least 500,000 customers lost power. Within 40 minutes, distribution networks were allowed to reconnect all customers, although voltage control continued in some areas until 18:07.

The incident was described as a "gigantic coincidence" and was not attributed to lack of investment. Nonetheless, a number of issues were exposed by the event. The behaviour of generation protection during sudden frequency changes caused a number of generators to disconnect from the grid incorrectly. The Low Frequency Demand Disconnection and voltage control schemes also did not deliver as much demand reduction as they were intended to, but this did not have a significant impact on the outage.

=== August 2019 ===
On 9 August 2019, around a million customers across Great Britain found themselves without power. Lightning struck a transmission line at 4:52 pm, causing the loss of 500 MW of embedded (mostly solar) generation. Almost immediately, Little Barford Power Station and Hornsea Wind Farm tripped within seconds of each other, removing 1.378 GW of generation, which was in excess of the 1 GW of backup power (the size of the largest single expected loss) that the operator was maintaining at the time. The grid frequency fell to 48.8 Hz before automatic load-shedding disconnected 5% of the local distribution networks (1.1 million customers) for 15 to 20 minutes; this action stabilised the remaining 95% of the system and prevented a wider blackout.

Although power was maintained at all times to the railway network (but not to the signalling system), the reduction in frequency caused 60 Thameslink Class 700 and 717 trains to fail. Half were restarted by the drivers but the others required a technician to come out to the train to restart it. This led to substantial disruption for several hours on the East Coast Main Line and Thameslink services. The supply to Newcastle Airport was also disrupted, and a weakness was exposed in backup power arrangements at Ipswich Hospital.

An investigation by Ofgem concluded in January 2020. It found that Little Barford and Hornsea One had failed to remain connected to the grid following the lightning strike, and their operators – RWE and Ørsted respectively – agreed to each pay £4.5 million to Ofgem's redress fund. Additionally, Ofgem fined distribution network operator UK Power Networks £1.5M for beginning to reconnect customers before being cleared to do so, although this breach of procedure did not affect the recovery of the system.

=== March 2025 ===
In March 2025, a transformer at a substation serving Heathrow Airport caught fire, which led to the airport cancelling operations for the day. In July 2025, NESO reported that National Grid had become aware of a fault in July 2018, but that it had not been repaired. Excess moisture levels were found in substation components, for which bushings should have been replaced.

== Minor incidents ==
=== November 2015 ===
On 4 November 2015 National Grid issued an emergency notice asking for voluntary power cuts because of "multiple plant breakdowns". No power cuts occurred but wholesale electricity prices rose dramatically, with the grid paying up to £2,500 per megawatt-hour.

== See also ==
- Demand response
- Cost of electricity by source
- Economics of nuclear power plants – for cost comparisons
- Energy security and renewable technology
- Intermittent energy source
- TV pickup
- 2007 switching station flood at Walham, Gloucestershire
- List of energy storage projects
- List of major power outages
- Spark spread – calculating the cost of back-up
- Load management
- Three-phase electric power
- List of HVDC projects
- List of high voltage underground and submarine cables
- National Grid Reserve Service
- Energy in the United Kingdom
- High-voltage substations in the United Kingdom
- List of high-voltage transmission links in the United Kingdom
