= Billy Row =

Village in County Durham, England

Coordinates: 54.730°N 1.751°W

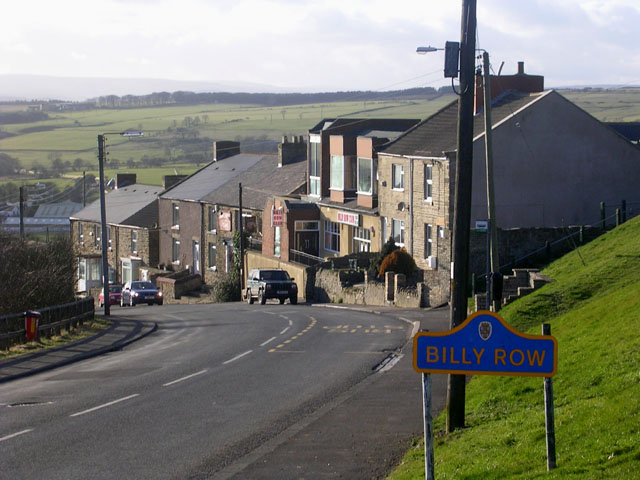
- Billy Row

- Location within County Durham
- OS grid reference: NZ161373
- Unitary authority: County Durham
- Ceremonial county: County Durham
- Region: North East
- Country: England
- Sovereign state: United Kingdom
- Post town: Crook
- Postcode district: DL15
- Police: Durham
- Fire: County Durham and Darlington
- Ambulance: North East
- UK Parliament: North West Durham

Billy Row is a village in County Durham, England. It is situated a short distance to the north of Crook. According to the 2001 census Billy Row has a population of 824.

== Etymology ==
The name Billy Row is of Old English origin. The element Billy is from billing ("a hill") with Row referring to a row of houses (OE rāw). Associations with Will o' the Raw (also known as William De Raw and Sir William Row) are folk etymology.
