= Grid code =

Specifications for electrical grids

A grid code is a technical specification which defines the parameters a facility connected to a public electric grid has to meet to ensure safe, secure and economic proper functioning of the electric system. The facility can be an electricity generating plant, a consumer, or another network. The grid code is specified by an authority responsible for the system integrity and network operation. Its elaboration usually implicates network operators (distribution or transmission system operators), representatives of users and, to an extent varying between countries, the regulating body.

Contents of a grid code vary depending on the transmission company's requirements. Typically, a grid code will specify the required behavior of a connected generator during system disturbances. These include voltage regulation, power factor limits and reactive power supply, response to a system fault (e.g. short-circuit), response to frequency changes on the grid, and requirement to "ride through" short interruptions of the connection.

There is not a common grid code in all countries and each electric grid has its own grid code. Even in North America, there is no grid code that applies to all territories.

== Independent power producers ==
All generators including Independent power producers like photovoltaic power stations or wind farms have to comply with the grid code.

== Categorizing ==
Grid code requirements can be divided into two categories: static and dynamic requirements.

== See also ==
- Smart grid
- RISSP
