= Birdfield =

Village in Argyll & Bute, Scotland

Coordinates: 56.099°N 5.279°W

- Location within Argyll and Bute
- OS grid reference: NR9694
- Council area: Argyll and Bute
- Country: Scotland
- Sovereign state: United Kingdom
- Police: Scotland
- Fire: Scottish
- Ambulance: Scottish

Birdfield is a village in Argyll and Bute, Scotland, 7 miles (11 km) north-east of Lochgilphead.
