= Anderby Creek =

Small hamlet in Lincolnshire, England, to the north of Skegness

Coordinates: 53°15′34″N 0°19′25″E

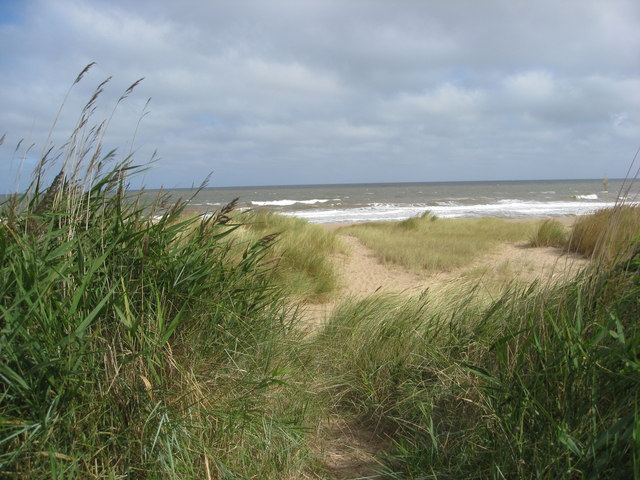
- Anderby Creek

- Location within Lincolnshire
- Population: (2011)
- District: East Lindsey
- Shire county: Lincolnshire
- Region: East Midlands
- Country: England
- Sovereign state: United Kingdom
- Post town: Skegness
- Postcode district: PE24
- Police: Lincolnshire
- Fire: Lincolnshire
- Ambulance: East Midlands
- UK Parliament: Boston and Skegness

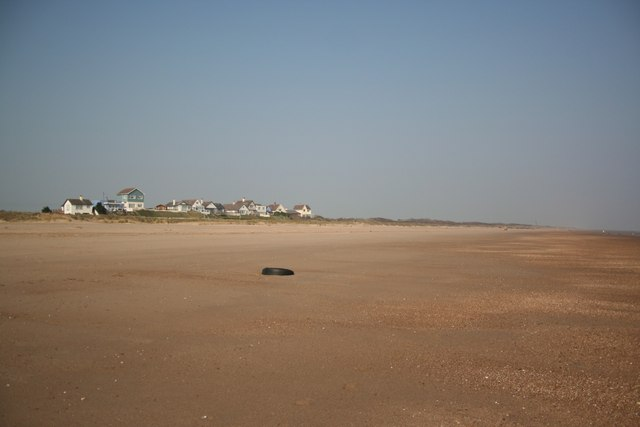
View from the beach

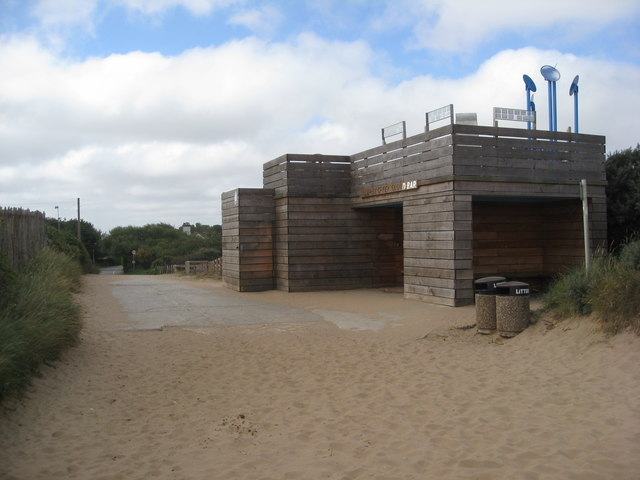
The Cloud Station

Anderby Creek is a small holiday village in Lincolnshire, England, to the north of Skegness. Part of the parish of Anderby, it is on the North Sea coast, 4 kilometres (2.5 mi) north of Chapel St Leonards, and is known for its caravan parks and holiday retreats.

== History ==
There is archaeological evidence of a medieval harbour on the original creek, before it was canalised.

During World War II RAF Anderby Creek was home to the first battle training school of the Royal Air Force Regiment. There was also a searchlight battery.

In December 2025, Ofgem approved two subsea National Grid connections landing at Anderby Creek linking Scottish windfarms to southern England, which could start operations by 2034. The two Eastern Green Links subsea power cables, EGL3 from Peterhead and EGL4 from Westfield, Fife will connect near Anderby Creek to a new 75 miles (121 km) link between Grimsby and Walpole, Norfolk.

== Geography ==
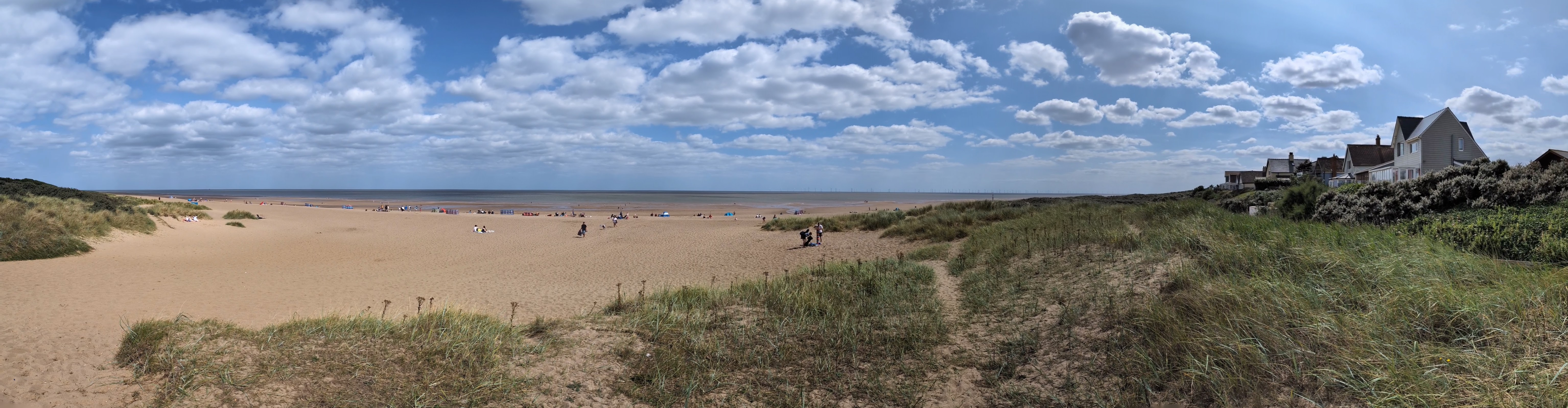
Panorama of the beach at Anderby Creek as seen from the main beach entrance.

There is a long sandy beach at Anderby Creek, between Sandilands and Mablethorpe to the north and Chapel St Leonards and Skegness to the south.

== Landmarks ==
One of the more unusual tourist attractions on the Lincolnshire coast is the Cloud Bar at Anderby Creek. The "world's first official cloud spotting area" was the work of Manchester artist Michael Trainor.

Anderby Creek is known for its caravan parks and holiday retreats, with Anderby Springs Caravan Park, Beachside Caravan Park, Poplar Zareba Caravan Park, Rose's Family Caravan Park, Sandy Feet Retreat, Moggs Retreat and Seaside Lodge among others located here. In 1981 there were about 560 caravans and 60 chalets in Anderby Creek.

The Anderby Drainage Museum is in pumping station houses on Anderby Drain in the hamlet, which were built in 1945. Two station houses contain two Ruston 10HRC twin cylinder oil engines, which were installed to drain 9200 acres of land. The museum contains numerous artifacts on display such as old drainage tools, photographs and documents.
