= Lincs Wind Farm =

Offshore wind farm off the east coast of England

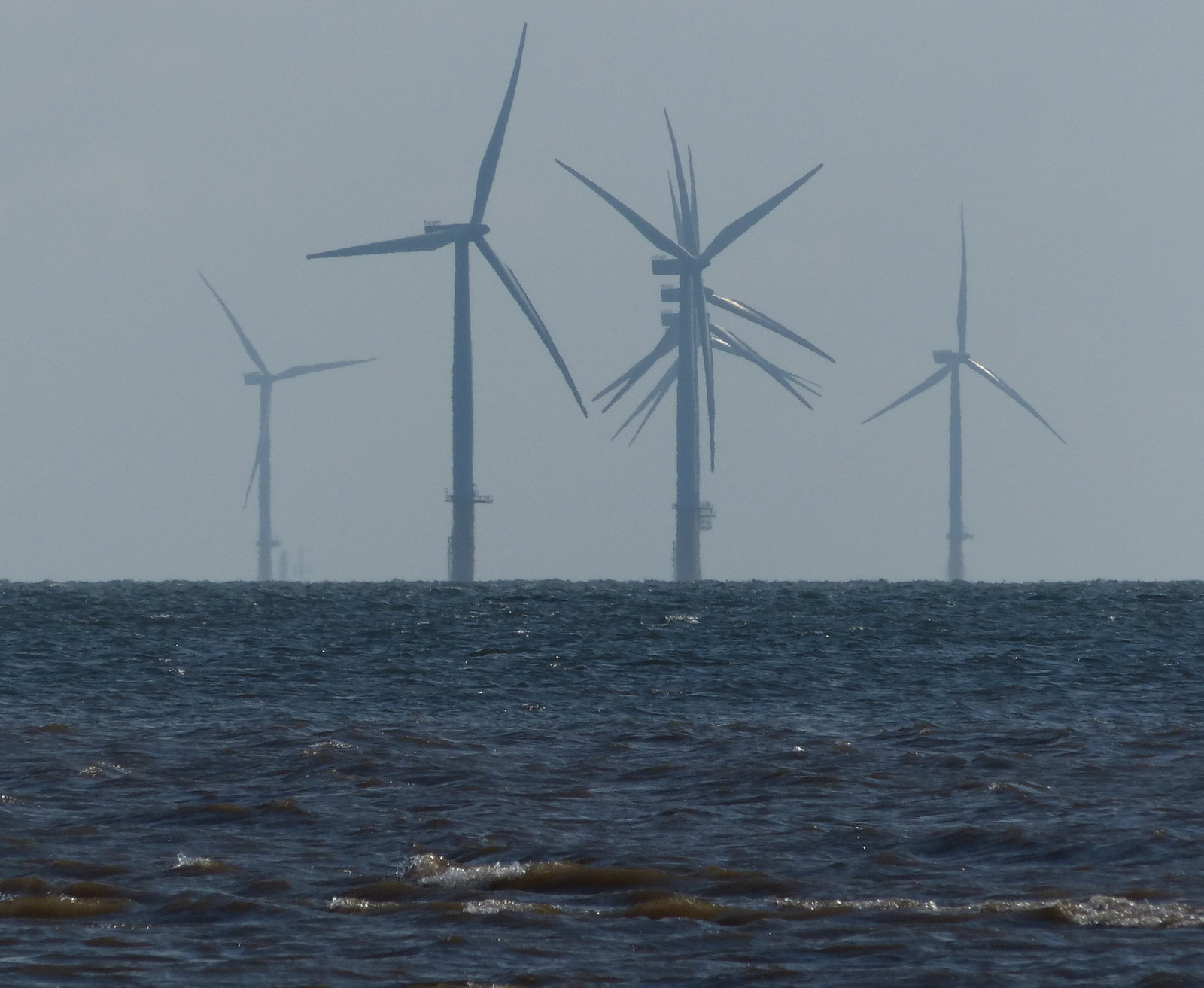
- Lincs Offshore Wind Farm turbines behind those of Lynn and Inner Dowsing
- Country: United Kingdom
- Location: North Sea
- Coordinates: 53°11′00″N 0°29′00″E
- Status: Operational
- Construction began: 2010
- Commission date: 2012
- Construction cost: £1 billion
- Owners: Macquarie European Infrastructure Fund 5; Green Investment Group; Ørsted
- Operator: Ørsted

Wind farm
- Type: Offshore
- Distance from shore: 8 km (5.0 mi)
- Hub height: 100 m (330 ft)
- Rotor diameter: 120 m (390 ft)
- Site area: 35 km^{2} (14 sq mi)

Power generation
- Units operational: 75 × 3.6 MW
- Make and model: Siemens Gamesa SWT-3.6-120 (75)
- Nameplate capacity: 270 MW

External links
- Commons: Related media on Commons

Wind farm layout

The Lincs Wind Farm is a 270 MW offshore wind farm 8 kilometres (5.0 mi) off Skegness on the east coast of England. The total cost of the project is estimated at £1 billion including electrical transmission links. The farm was completed in 2013. It is adjacent to the smaller Lynn and Inner Dowsing Wind Farm.

== History ==
Centrica acquired the Lincs Wind Farm project in 2004 from Renewable Energy Systems, in 2008 the company obtained planning permission for the project.

In December 2009 Ørsted A/S (then named DONG Energy) and Siemens Project Ventures jointly acquired 50% of the project (25% share each) for £50 million, plus 50% of the capital cost of the project.

Preparatory construction work for the development included the extension of the National Grid electricity substation at Walpole, Norfolk, which began in April 2009. (Note: Lincs, Docking Shoal and Race Bank wind farms were to share the same onshore cable export route, and onshore substation. The environmental statement for the onshore works was submitted as part of the Lincs Wind Farm application.) In June 2010 Siemens obtained the contract for the offshore electrical substation (£101 million). Transmission cables from offshore to onshore electrical substations were installed in 2010–2011. Construction of the offshore facilities of the wind farm began in 2011, with the installation of the offshore electricity substation foundations. The Port of Hull was selected as one of the logistics bases for the wind farm turbine installation, supplying wind tower transition pieces. Jack-up barge JB114 arriving at the port in March 2012. Great Yarmouth was also used as a base for the wind farm installation.

Construction of the offshore 33 kV to 132 kV substation (structure sub-contracted to McNulty Offshore Construction/Atkins PLC.) and of the onshore 132 kV to 400 kV substation was completed by April 2012.

In August 2011, the consortia of Ørsted, Siemens, and Centrica began to seek financing for the £1 billion project, committing to providing £166.7, £75 and £333.3 million respectively (£575 million total). In June 2012 the consortia obtained financing for the project with £425 million of nonrecourse debt facilities provided from a consortium of 10 banks. Approximately 75% of the project cost was for the wind farm installation, the remainder for the high voltage electricity transmission link.

Construction began in 2010; installation of the 75-monopile tower foundation by MT Højgaard was completed by June 2012, with the underwater installation phase completed by September 2012. The first generator had been installed by 14 July 2012. The wind farm was scheduled to become operational in the second half of 2012, and be complete by 2013: the final turbine was installed by March 2013; and the wind farm officially opened by Deputy Prime Minister Nick Clegg in August 2013, with commissioning complete in September 2013. The license for the electrical transmission link was awarded to TC Lincs OFTO Limited for £308 million in late 2014.

== Technical description ==
The scheme has 250 MW of generating capacity, with an additional 20 MW of turbine generating capacity constructed within the nearby Lynn Wind Farm and Dowsing Wind Farm but connected to the Lincs project transmission system. The project uses 75 three blade 3.6 MW Siemens wind turbines. The wind turbines have 120 metres (390 ft) rotor diameter machines with 58.5 metres (192 ft) blades with a hub height of 100 metres (330 ft) on cylindrical steel towers. The turbines were installed in 10 to 15 metres (33 to 49 ft) water depth, with a spacing of approximately 500 metres (1,600 ft) within a 35 square kilometres (14 sq mi) wind farm.

Transmission of electrical power to land is by 145 kV cables supplied by Nexans. Transmission voltage is 132 kV to land, being increased to 400 kV at Walpole substation for grid connection.

The operation and maintenance base for the wind farm is based at Grimsby, where crews travel 1½ hours by boat to and from the wind farm.

As at 2019, the windfarm has a rolling capacity factor of 39%. Its levelised cost has been estimated at £166/MWh.

The wind farm has an expected lifespan of 40 years, with electrical equipment and wind turbines expected to be replaced after 20 years. After the end of the project's lifespan the farm is to be decommissioned, including removal of turbines and electrical equipment, and removal of offshore foundations or cut off to seabed level or lower. Connecting cables are not scheduled to be removed.

== See also ==
- List of offshore wind farms in the United Kingdom
- List of offshore wind farms in the North Sea
- List of offshore wind farms
- Wind power in the United Kingdom
