= Burbo Bank Offshore Wind Farm =

Wind farm in the Irish Sea

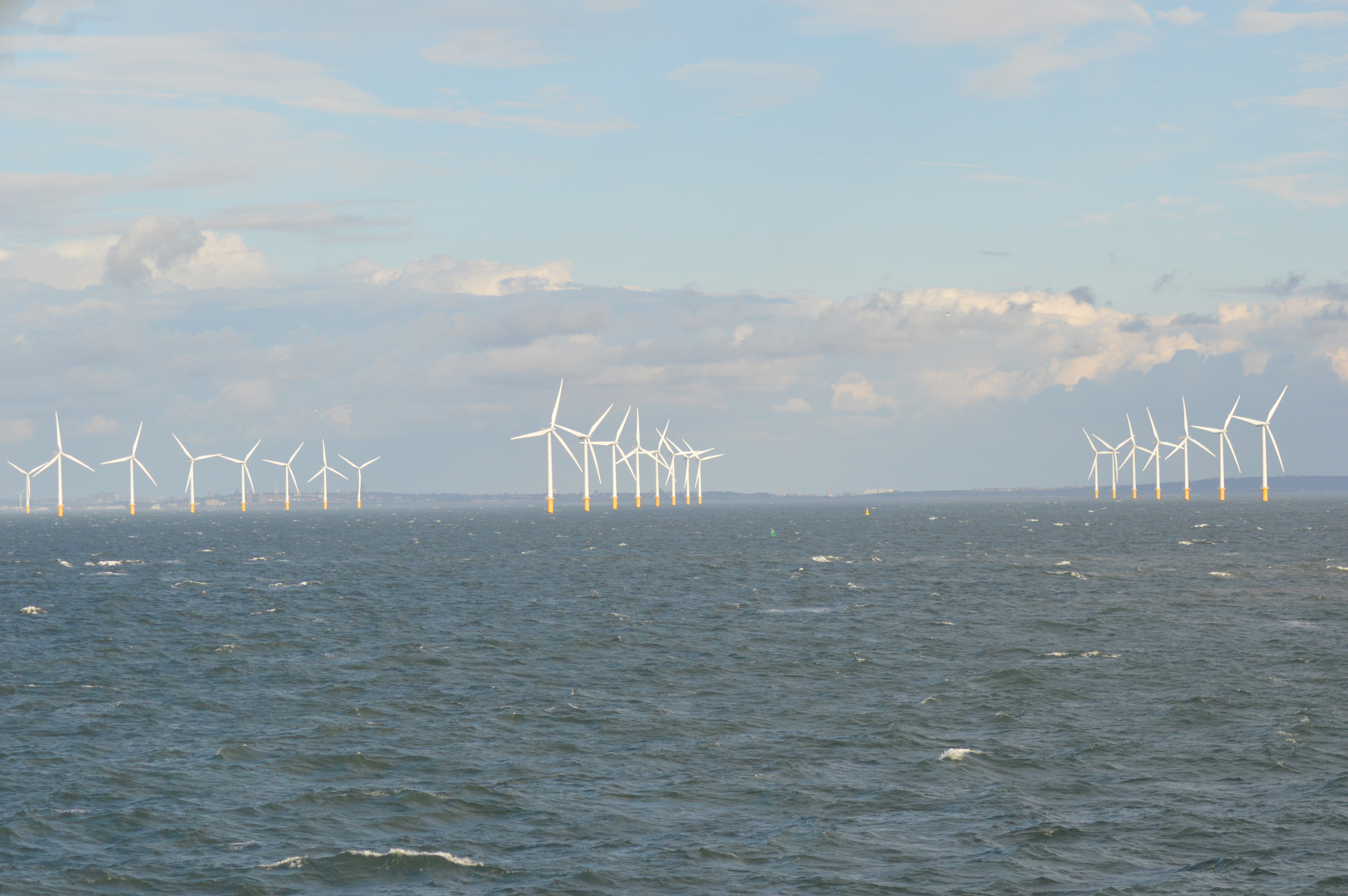
- Country: United Kingdom
- Location: Burbo Flats in Liverpool Bay at the entrance to the River Mersey, Merseyside
- Coordinates: 53°29′00″N 3°10′00″W
- Status: Operational
- Commission date: 2007
- Owner: Ørsted

Wind farm
- Type: Offshore
- Max. water depth: 0.5 to 13 m (1 ft 8 in to 42 ft 8 in)
- Rotor diameter: 107 m (351 ft)

Power generation
- Units operational: 25 × 3.6 MW; 32 × 8 MW
- Make and model: Siemens Gamesa SWT-3.6-107 (25); Vestas V164-8.0MW (32)
- Nameplate capacity: 348 MW
- Capacity factor: ~30%

External links
- Commons: Related media on Commons

Wind farm layout

The Burbo Bank Offshore Wind Farm is a 348 MW offshore wind farm located on the Burbo Flats in Liverpool Bay on the west coast of the UK in the Irish Sea. It consists of an original 90 MW wind farm commissioned in 2007 and a 258 MW extension completed in 2017.

The wind farm was developed in the 2000s by SeaScape Energy, which was acquired by DONG Energy (now Ørsted) in 2005. A 25 turbine installation using Siemens Wind Power 3.6 MW turbines was constructed from 2005, and officially opened in 2007. A further 32 8 MW turbines were constructed in 2016–17.

== Initial Construction ==
In September 2002 SeaScape Energy ( Zilkha Renewable Energy, enXco A/S, Wind Prospect Ltd. joint venture.) submitted an application to develop a Round 1 offshore wind farm site. The site, located on Burbo Flats in Liverpool bay (~7 km northwest of Wirral and ~6 km west of the Sefton coastline) was selected due to shallow water depths (0.5 to 8m at low tide), high wind speeds ~7 m/s (23 ft/s), and a generally favourable location including proximity to an electrical grid connection. Initial expectations were for a 30 × 3 MW turbine wind farm, with monopile foundations on a site of approximately 10 km^{2} (3.9 sq mi). An electrical connection to the mainland grid was to be made by a seabed cable running southeast to Wirral, followed by a ~3.5 km underground cable to a substation at Wallasey. SeaScape received a capital grant of £10 million in 2003 to aid development of the project.

In 2003 EDF subsidiary enXco bought the interests of Wind Prospect in the project, the project became a joint venture between Elsam and EDF Energies Nouvelles in 2004 with Elsam taking 50% of the projecty. In September 2005 Siemens Wind Power was selected as the turbine supplier, with 25 3.6 MW turbines ordered at a cost of over €90 million. In December 2005 Dong Energy (now Ørsted) became sole owner of the project.

The logo of Orsted who owns the wind farm.

Construction began in June 2006. Contractor for the foundation installation was MT Højgaard: the foundation design was by Ramboll, Smulders supplied the WTG foundations, turbine towers by Bladt Industries, monopiles and transition pieces were from Sif; piling was done by Menck, with Mammoet Van Oord supplying lifting barge platform Jumping Jack.

The contractor for the substation was EDF Energy Contracting, cable installation was by McNicholas Construction Services Ltd. (onshore) and Submarine Cable & Pipe (offshore), with cables supplied by ABB Group. Inter turbine and grid connection to the substation was at 33 kV, with voltage step up to 132 kV at the substation for grid connection.

The facility began generating power in July 2007, and the wind farm was officially inaugurated on 18 October 2007, and the facility was commercially operational by the end of 2007; the capital cost of developing the wind farm was €181 million. Its levelised cost has been estimated as £87/MWh.

Between 2008 and 2010, the capacity factor was between 32 and 35%. In 2009 the whole wind farm was put out of action for 4 weeks due to a failure in the underground electrical cable connecting to the National Grid. During summer 2010 Siemens decided to change the blade bearings on all 25 turbines as a pre-emptive measure after corrosion was found in blade bearings found on other sites.

At the end of the windfarm's operational life (25 years) the wind farm will be decommissioned.

== Extension ==
=== Planning, funding and design ===
In 2009 the Crown Estate announced that wind farm operators could apply for extensions to their Round 1 or Round 2 offshore wind farms; DONG Energy identified Burbo Bank as a potential site and began consultation on a ~90 km^{2} (35 sq mi) extension westwards of the original wind farm. Between 2009 and 2010 the area of the site was reduced to the north increase clearance from the shipping lanes to the Port of Liverpool; to the south and to the west, reducing potential impact on recreational sailing activities and on certain species of sea bird, and due to potential conflicts with ship anchoring sites; also reducing the visual impact from land. In April 2010 the Crown Estate awarded an area of 40 km^{2} (15 sq mi) for lease.

Water depths in the area are between 6 and 13 metres (20 and 43 ft). The sea bed consisted primarily of sand. The underlying geology is sand overlaying clay overlaying mudstone. Samples within the turbine area showed sand followed by clay down to around 30m before weak mudstone was found.

The initial cable export route and grid connection identified was one making landfall near to the existing Burbo Bank land connection, and connected to a 275 kV substation in Birkenhead; subsequently a potential grid connection at the 400 kV Deeside substation (near Deeside Power Station, Wales) was identified; and later a connection with landfall at Ffrith Beach, (nr. Prestatyn, Wales) to an extension of the new Bodelwyddan 400 kV substation under construction for the Gwynt y Môr Offshore Wind Farm. In 2011 the developer reached an agreement with the National Grid to use to a connection near the Bodelwyddan substation.

The planned export cable route crossed a number of pre-existing cables and pipelines: a set of pipelines related to the Liverpool Bay oil and gas field, connecting the Douglas Complex to landfall were crossed in the Mid-Hoyle channel the export cable route also ran close to the North Hoyle Offshore Wind Farm export cable; and crossed the 500 MW East–West Interconnector, as well as the planned route of the 2000 MW Western HVDC Link.

Initial expectations were for construction to start in early 2015, and be complete by early 2017, subject to final specifications; neither foundation nor turbine type was specified, an offshore substation to step up the inter turbine voltage (either 33 or 66 kV) to an export voltage of either 132 or 275 kV, connection to the National Grid would be made at 400 kV, stepped up at an onshore substation at Bodelwyddan.

The wind farm extension received contract for difference renewable energy subsidy funding from the UK government in April 2014, with a strike price of £150 per MWh (2012 prices). DONG made the decision to proceed with construction of the wind farm in December 2014.

DONG Energy (now Ørsted) sold half of the wind farm extension to KIRKBI A/S (Lego holding company) and Danish pension fund PKA for £660 million in February 2016.

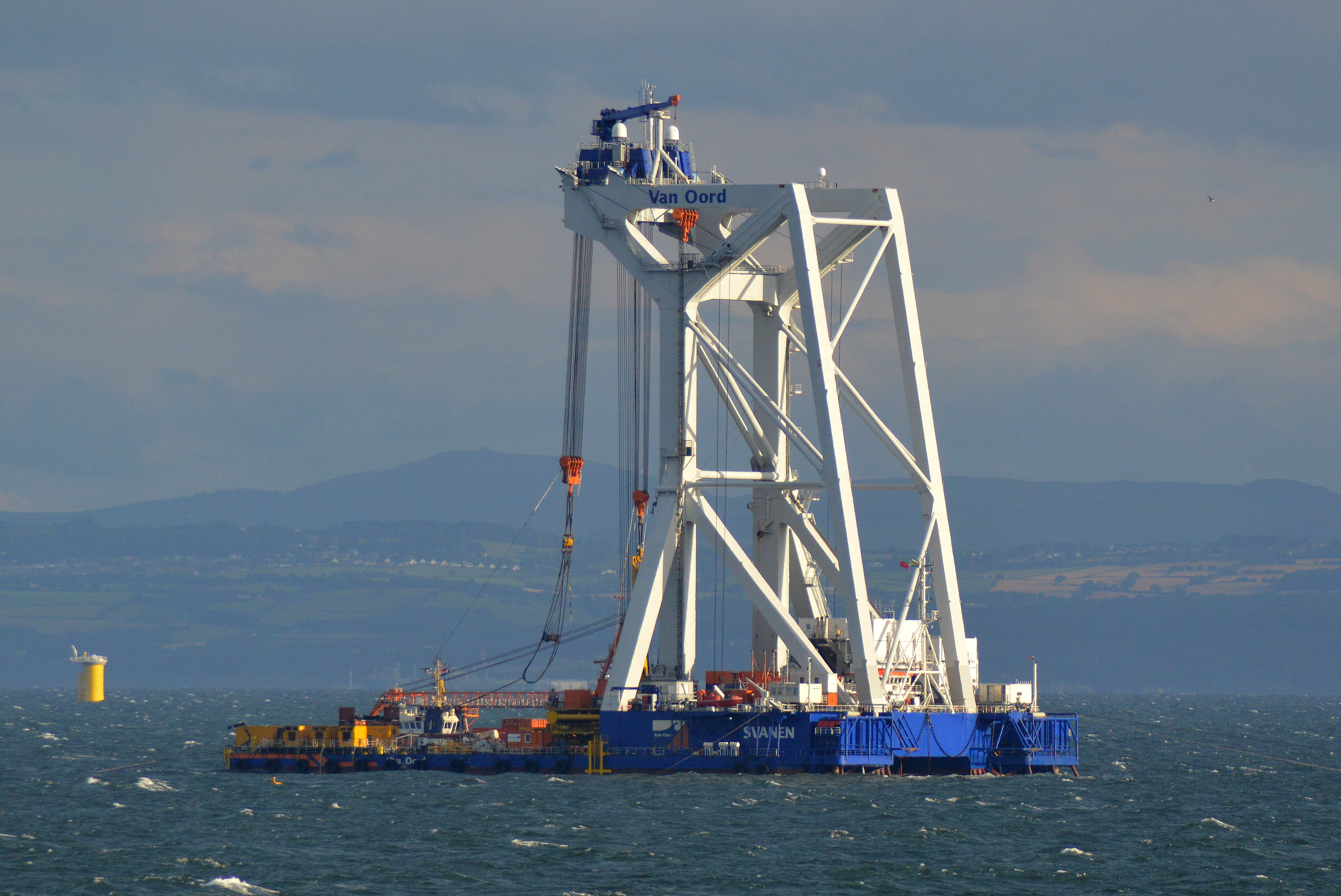
Svanen, lifting ship, Burbo Banks Offshore Windfarm Extension

=== Construction ===
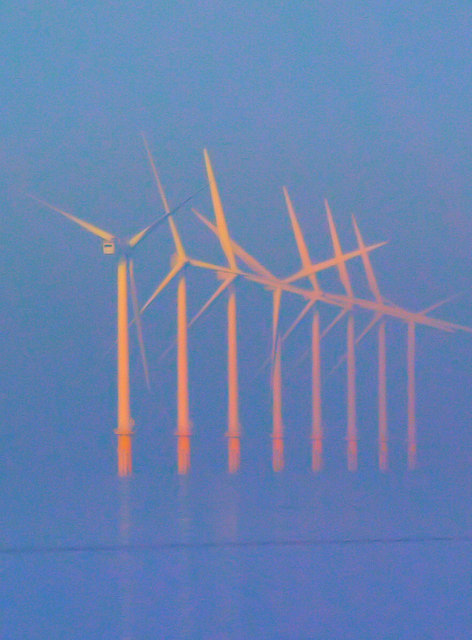
Turbines viewed from the shore

In early 2014, DONG Energy announced that the Vestas' V164 8.0 MW turbine was the preferred model for the development, and made preliminary agreements to buy 32 units in August 2014. The order for 32 turbines was confirmed in December 2014, the first series production of the type. The nacelles are to be produced at the former Odense Steel Shipyard, while the blades are made at Vestas' Isle of Wight facilities. Assembly will take place in Belfast.

In August 2014 ABB was awarded the contract to supply export cables. Suppliers for inter array cabling was Nexans; DONG Energy having agreed to a long-term supply arrangement for inter array cabling with Nexans in August 2014.

In January 2015 RXPE (Rongxin Power Engineering) was awarded the design and build contract for the Burbo 2 extension Dynamic Reactive Compensation electrical equipment (STATCOM); and Bladt Industries and EEW Group obtained the contract to construct wind turbine foundations and structures, with transition pieces to be manufactured by Bladt/EEW jv Offshore Structures (Britain) Ltd. (former TAG Energy Solutions plant in Billingham, UK), and by Bladt at Aalborg (Denmark) with monopiles made at EEW's factory in Rostock (Germany).

In April 2015 A2SEA was contracted to for turbine installations, and Jan De Nul contracted to install the offshore export cable. In June 2015 Van Oord were contracted for foundation installation. In October 2015 DONG Energy's two 200 tonne transformers were delivered by Collett & Sons Ltd to the onshore substation via 550 Tonne capacity girder bridge. In early 2016 DONG Energy acquired a lease on Cammell Laird's yard in Birkenhead to be used as a base during the construction of the wind farm.

The first 8MW turbine was installed in September 2016. The wind farm extension was commissioned in April 2017. Its levelised cost has been estimated at £147/MWh.

After around 20–25 years of operation the wind farm would be expected to be decommissioned, including removal off all offshore components above seabed level.

== See also ==
- List of offshore wind farms
- List of offshore wind farms in the United Kingdom
- List of offshore wind farms in the Irish Sea
