= Global Infrastructure Partners =

Infrastructure investment fund

Global Infrastructure Management, LLC
- Type: Subsidiary
- Industry: Private equity
- Founded: May 2006; 20 years ago
- Founders: Jonathan Bram; Matt Harris; Michael McGhee; Adebayo Ogunlesi; Raj Rao; Bill Woodburn
- Headquarters: New York City, U.S.
- Key people: Adebayo Ogunlesi (chairman and CEO); Raj Rao (president and COO); Jim Yong Kim (vice chairman)
- AUM: approx. US$170 billion (2025)
- Parent: BlackRock
- Website: www.global-infra.com

Global Infrastructure Partners, LLC (GIP) is an American infrastructure investment fund making equity and selected debt investments across markets worldwide. GIP's main headquarters are located in New York City, U.S. and its equity investments are based on infrastructure assets in the energy, transport and water & waste sectors. GIP employs approximately 150 investment and operational professionals and has offices in New York, London, Stamford, Sydney, Melbourne, Brisbane, Mumbai, Delhi, Singapore and Hong Kong. In total as of 2023, its portfolio companies employ approximately 100,000 people, according to the company website. BlackRock acquired the company in 2024.

== History ==
Global Infrastructure Partners was established in May 2006. Two founding investors in its first fund, GIP I, were Credit Suisse and General Electric. Each committed approximately 9% of the US$5.64 billion of GIP I's committed capital.

The firm's first investment was announced in October 2006. It was a 50:50 joint venture between GIP and American International Group (AIG) to acquire London City Airport for an undisclosed sum. GIP announced the sale of the asset in February 2016 for a significant multiple of its acquisition price.

GIP has made two additional notable airport investments: the October 2009 acquisition of Gatwick Airport, the second largest airport in the United Kingdom by passenger traffic, for £1.5 billion from BAA and the 2012 acquisition of Edinburgh Airport for £807 million.

GIP has made a cross-section of investments in other areas of the transport sector as well as the natural resource and power generation areas of the energy sector. These assets include seaports, freight rail facilities, midstream natural resources and power generation businesses.

Global Infrastructure Partners' first fund, GIP I, completed its fund raising in May 2008 with $5.64 billion in investor capital commitments. The fund became fully invested during 2012.

In September 2012, GIP's second fund, GIP II, completed fund raising with US$8.25 billion in investor capital commitments, making it the largest independent infrastructure fund in the world at that time. Exceeding what it had initially projected, GIP's third fund—GIP III—completed fund raising in January 2017 with approximately $15.8 billion in investor capital commitments. GIP's fourth equity Fund, GIP IV, completed fund raising in December 2019, raising $22 billion.

GIP also manages several other Funds which focus on investments in infrastructure in other asset classes or target specific regions. GIP's Credit business manages over $4 billion across three Funds: GIP Capital Solutions I and GIP Capital Solutions II and GIP Spectrum.

In January 2024, the investment management corporation BlackRock announced its acquisition of Global Infrastructure Partners for $12.5 billion with Perella Weinberg as financial advisor. This move aims to tap into the infrastructure market, forecasted to be one of the fastest-growing segments of private markets in the years ahead. On October 1, 2024, it was announced that BlackRock had completed the purchase of GIP.

In October 2025, GIP, the AI Infrastructure Partnership and Abu Dhabi investment firm MGX agreed to acquire all of Aligned Data Centers from funds managed by Macquarie Asset Management. The transaction valued Aligned at approximately US$40 billion. The acquisition was completed in July 2026, after which the consortium committed an additional US$5 billion in growth capital to Aligned.

== Current investments ==
As of January 2023 Global Infrastructure Partners had aggregate assets under management of approximately US$100 billion, such investments being concentrated in OECD countries, generating revenues of approximately US$80 billion. Its portfolio specifically included investment in the following assets:

- ADNOC Gas Pipelines
- Access Midstream Partners
- ACS Renewables
- Ascend Telecom Infrastructure Private Limited
- Atlas Renewable Energy
- Biffa
- Bluepoint Wind
- Borkum Riffgrund 2
- ChannelView Cogeneration
- Clearway Energy
- Compañía Logistíca de Hidrocarburos
- Competitive Power Ventures
- CyrusOne
- East India Petroleum
- Edinburgh Airport
- Empresa Eléctrica Guacolda S.A.
- EnLink Midstream (sold to ONEOK in 2024)
- Eolian Energy
- Freeport LNG
- Naturgy (fka Gas Natural SGD, S.A.)
- Gatwick Airport
- Gladstone LNG Project
- Gode Wind 1
- Great Yarmouth
- Hess Infrastructure Partners
- Heathrow Airport
- Hornsea 1
- London City Airport
- Pacific National
- Peel Ports
- Perdaman Karratha Ammonia-Urea Project
- Pluto Train 2
- Port of Melbourne
- Port of Brisbane Corporation
- QCLNG Common Facilities
- Rio Grande LNG
- Ruby Pipeline
- Saavi Energía
- Signature Aviation
- Skyborn Renewables
- SUEZ Group
- Sydney Airport
- Terra-Gen Power
- TransitGas AG
- Terminal Investment Limited
- Tramarsa
- Vantage Towers AG
- Vena Energy

== Previous investments ==
- Medallion Gathering & Processing (sold to ONEOK in 2024)
