= Hornsea Wind Farm =

Wind farm in the North Sea

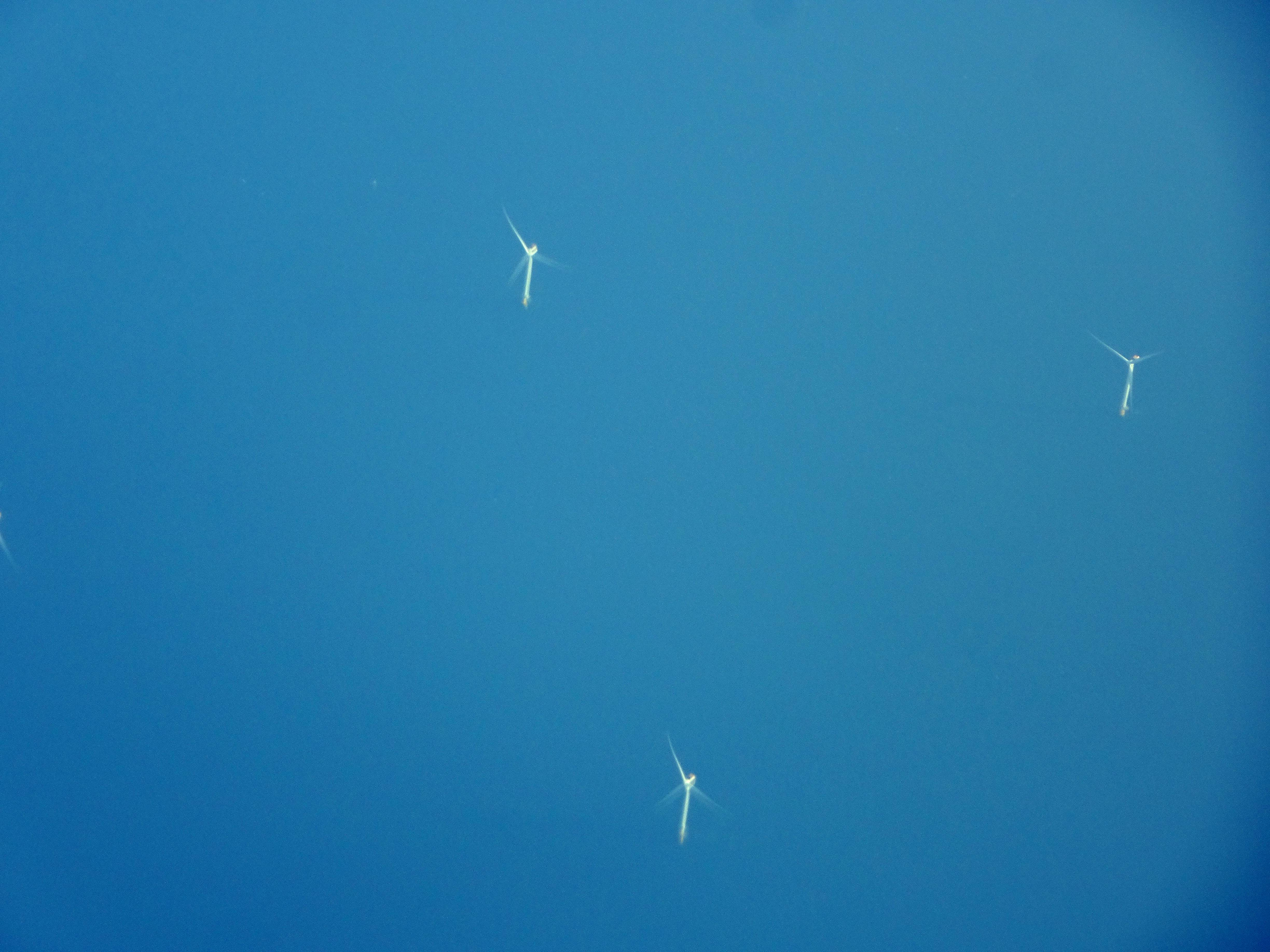
- Country: England, United Kingdom (offshore)
- Location: North Sea
- Coordinates: 53°53′06″N 1°47′28″E
- Status: Operational
- Commission date: 2020 (Hornsea One); 2022 (Hornsea Two)
- Owner: Ørsted

Wind farm
- Type: Offshore

Power generation
- Units operational: 174 × 7 MW (One); 165 × 8.4 MW (Two)
- Make and model: Siemens Gamesa SWT-7.0-154 (One); Siemens Gamesa 8.0-167 DD (Two)
- Nameplate capacity: 1218 MW (One); 1386 MW (Two)

External links
- Website: hornseaproject3.co.uk
- Commons: Related media on Commons

Wind farm layout

Hornsea Wind Farm is a Round 3 wind farm which began construction in 2018. Situated in the North Sea 120 km (75 miles) off the east coast of England, the eventual wind farm group is planned to have a total capacity of up to 6 gigawatt (GW).

The development has been split into a number of subzones. The 1.2 GW Project 1 gained planning consent in 2014. Construction of Hornsea One started in January 2018, and the first turbines began supplying power to the UK national electricity grid in February 2019. The turbines were all installed by October 2019 and the equipment fully commissioned in December 2019. With a capacity of 1,218 MW, it was the largest in the world on its completion.

A second 1.4 GW Project 2 was given planning consent in 2016. First power was achieved in December 2021, and it became fully operational in August 2022 overtaking Hornsea One as the largest offshore wind farm in the world.

In 2016 a third subzone was split into two projects Hornsea 3 and 4, with approximate capacities of 1–2 GW and 1 GW, increasing the capacity of the developed project to a maximum of 6 GW.

In July 2023, British government officials gave the final approval for Hornsea Four, the fourth phase of the wind project. Hornsea Four was cancelled on 7 May 2025.

== History ==
The tendering process for Round 3 offshore wind farm opportunities was begun by the Crown Estate in 2008. Bids were received in March 2009, and Zone Development Agreements signed in December 2009. The Hornsea development zone was awarded to a joint venture (SMart Wind) of Siemens and a consortium Mainstream Renewable Power including Hochtief. The development had an estimated potential generating capacity of 4 GW.

The Hornsea site is one of three off the British coast in the North Sea, roughly halfway between the other two: Dogger Bank Wind Farm and East Anglia Wind Farm. The Hornsea site ('Zone 4', also known as 'Holderness' zone) has a total area of 4,730 square kilometres (1,830 sq mi), and is 38 kilometres (24 mi) from land at the closest point; water depth in the zone is from 22 to 73 metres (72 to 240 ft), with a tidal range of 2 to 5 metres (6 ft 7 in to 16 ft 5 in), and typical annual wave height of 1.35 to 1.78 metres (4 ft 5 in to 5 ft 10 in). The surface of the seabed consists primarily of sands and gravel.

In 2011 the Danish firm Ørsted A/S (then named DONG Energy) became a partner in SMart Wind. In early 2015 Ørsted A/S became the 100% owner of the first phase, Project 1, of the scheme. Ørsted acquired rights to the remaining subzones of the Hornsea development (2 & 3) by August 2015.

In 2016 Ørsted reached an agreement with the Crown Estate for amended plans for the Hornsea Two and Hornsea Three phases. Hornsea Three was split into two new projects, Hornsea Three and Hornsea Four; the new phases were expected to be developed in the 2020s. The changes increased the potential generating capacity of the wind farm to 6 GW, with Hornsea Three estimated at 1–2 GW and Hornsea Four at about 1 GW.

== Hornsea Project 1 ==
The initial scoping report for "Project One" within the Hornsea zone identified it as a subzone of 629.6 square kilometres (243.1 sq mi) in the centre of the Hornsea zone, with an estimated potential wind farm of 1.2 GW, divided into two further subzones of 600 MW capacity each. The zone was to connect to an existing 400 kV National Grid substation at Killingholme. A variety of configurations were considered – foundations of pile jacket, monopile or gravity base; turbines from 3.6 to 8 MW rated power; with electrical power export by HVDC. Later DONG Energy added the consideration to use HVAC export cables. The chosen cable export was planned to make landfall at Horseshoe Point (northeast of Marshchapel, East Lindsey), then passing 40 kilometres (25 mi) west and northwest to a substation near Killingholme Power Station, North Killingholme in North Lincolnshire.

Within the zone of Project 1 the primary underlying geology consisted of deposits from the Quaternary Period consisting of Bolders bank, Botney Cut and Eem formations – primarily sediments or tills – gravelley/sandy clays, overlying sediments were sands or gravels up to 2 to 3 metres (6 ft 7 in to 9 ft 10 in) thick, with waves within the area varying in height by 1 to 3 metres (3 ft 3 in to 9 ft 10 in). Project 1 water depths were generally 25 to 30 metres (82 to 98 ft).

In 2011 Smart Wind signed lease agreements with the Crown Estate for "Heron Wind" and "Njord" areas making up the zone. The zone was given provisional Contracts for Difference (CfD) renewable subsidies by the UK government in April 2014. Hornsea Project 1 was given planning consent in December 2014. The CfD strike price was £140 per MWh (in 2012 prices). In early 2015 DONG acquired all of the project, becoming 100% owner.

Seabed investigation including boreholes at turbine foundation positions was completed by Fugro by April 2015. In mid 2015 DONG selected Siemens Wind Power 7 MW turbines with 154 metres (505 ft) rotor turbines for the project – around 171 turbines would be used for the wind farm. In its 2015 financial report DONG stated it had chosen to use suction bucket foundations on a third of the turbines at Hornsea. The rationale for use of the new foundation type is thought to be a simplified foundation installation, requiring only a heavy-lift crane to lower the foundation to the sea bed, reducing costs. (Note: Suction bucket with jacket foundations were tested at Borkum Riffgrund.)

DONG Energy formally committed to building the wind farm in early 2016. The expected completion date for the project was 2020. A £25 million contract to construct the onshore substation at North Killingholme had been awarded to Balfour Beatty in late 2015.

NKT Cables and ABB were awarded €139 (c. $158) million and $250 million contracts to supply 220 kV AC export cables in March/April 2016. In late 2016 JDR Cables was contracted to supply 242 kilometres (150 mi) of inter-array subsea power cables for the wind farm; Nexans was awarded a contract for 139 kilometres (86 mi) of inter-array cables; and EEW Group was awarded a contract to supply 116 monopiles. Bladt Industries/Offshore Structures (Britain) Ltd. was awarded a contract for 96 tower transition pieces in early 2017, to be constructed at Aalborg, Denmark and Billingham, UK. Dragados Offshore was awarded in early 2016, a contract for construction of four jacket type foundations for the AC platforms at its yard in Cádiz, Spain.

=== Construction ===
Construction of the onshore cable route was begun in late 2016 under J. Murphy & Sons. The wind farm was scheduled to be constructed between 2018 and 2020, and expected to provide an annual production of around 4.1 terawatt-hours (TWh).

The first foundation of the new windpark was installed by DEME Group's subsidiary GeoSea in January 2018. The export cables were installed by Tideway Offshore Solutions, a subsidiary company of the Belgian DEME Group. The installation was completed in December 2018, several months ahead of schedule.

Hornsea 1 began supplying power to the UK national electricity grid in February 2019, with full completion expected in the first quarter of 2020. The final monopile foundation was completed in April 2019 and as of 3 May 2019, 28 turbines out of 174 had been installed.

The final turbine was installed in October 2019 and the project was completed in early 2020.

=== Events ===
In 2019 the failure of the plant was partially responsible for a large scale nationwide power cut on the evening of 9 August.

At 16:52:33 on Friday 9 August 2019, lightning struck a 400 kV mainland transmission line between Eaton Socon and Wymondley north of London, causing small generators, Little Barford Power Station (641 MW) and Hornsea (737 MW) to unexpectedly disconnect a combined 1,878 MW (1,691 MW maximum single-time) supply within minutes, greater than the 1,000 MW limit. Grid frequency declined, initially below the 'exceptional circumstances' limit at 49.5 Hz, triggering additional generation and then more importantly below 48.8 Hz at which point the first stage of ‘Low Frequency Demand Disconnection’ (LFDD) a form of automatic load shedding commences to stabilise the grid. As part of this 1.1 million customers were disconnected; rail services were disrupted with 371 trains cancelled, 220 part cancelled, and 873 trains delayed. Power was restored at 17:37. Hornsea disconnected due to a software flaw, which was fixed the next day.

== Hornsea Project 2 ==
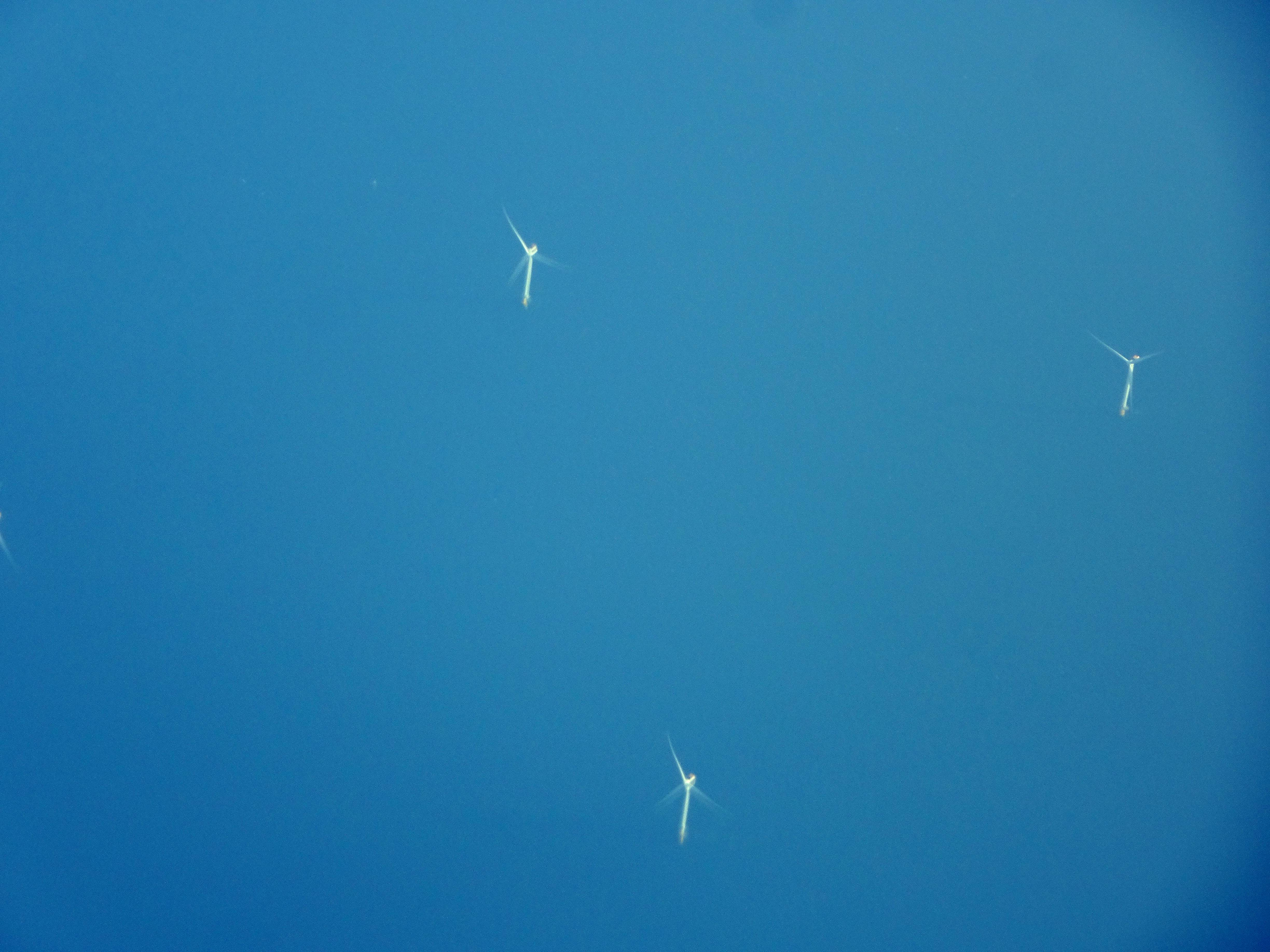
Hornsea 2 wind farm from the air

A scoping report for "Project Two" was published in October 2012. The subzone was expected to be developed in a number of phases, with a potential wind turbine capacity of 1.8 GW, in an area of around 400 square kilometres (150 sq mi) located in the centre of the Hornsea wind farm zone. Project 2 was use the same route for its electrical export cable as Project One, and to use either HVAC or HVDC with a separate onshore substation. Suitable areas for the Project 2 development were identified as being adjacent to the north, east or west of the Zone 1, which was located in the shallowest area of the whole Hornsea zone. The design considered piled, suction pile, monopile or gravity base foundations for wind turbines of 5 to 15 MW rated power.

As with Project 1 sea bed conditions and geology consisted of Quaternary period deposits, primarily sediments of sand, till and clays, with the overlying gravel or sand seabed including sandwaves, with the average water depth of 25 to 30 metres (82 to 98 ft).

In 2013 SMart wind signed lease agreements with the Crown Estate for the "Optimus Wind" and "Breesea" areas making up Project 2 of Hornsea wind farm. A planning application for Project 2 was submitted and accepted for examination in early 2015; its wind turbine area was located adjacent northwest of the Project 1 area, with the cable export route following that of Project 1 adjacent on the northward side. Planning permission for the development was awarded in August 2016, for 300 turbines covering 300 square miles (780 km^{2}) at a height of 620 feet (190 m) each. At the time of the award, Dong had committed to building 174 turbines, but the whole project is the biggest marine wind farm in the world.

=== Construction ===
By the time construction commenced in 2020, the selected area was to the east and north of Hornsea One and the specification had been set as 165 8 MW turbines giving a rated capacity of 1.4 GW. The inter-array cables were supplied by JDR Cable Systems, installed by Seaway 7, and operate at 66 kV.

As of April 2021, a third of the turbine foundations had been installed and the remaining turbines are set to be installed during the second half of 2021.

The first turbine was in place by the end of May 2021, and on 23 June 2021 Ørsted announced that the 16th turbine to be added to the Hornsea Two array was the 1,000th turbine they had installed in UK waters, fifteen years after they installed their first, which was part of the 30-turbine Barrow Offshore Wind Farm, off the coast of Cumbria. Having completed the offshore substation, first power was achieved by 20 December 2021, and became fully operational in August 2022. By doing so, Hornsea Project 2 overtook Hornsea One as the largest offshore wind farm in the world. Hornsea Two has two diesel-electric crew ships, where crews stay for two weeks while maintaining the turbines.

== Hornsea Project 3 ==
Project 3 will be to the east of Projects 1 and 2, with a capacity of 2.9 GW over 696 square kilometres (269 sq mi) once completed it will be the largest offshore wind farm in the world. DONG Energy (which in November 2017 changed its name to Ørsted) began consultation on the project's development in May 2016. Ørsted submitted a Development consent application in 2018 and consent was granted on 31 December 2020. In early 2023, consent was also given to a 600MWh capacity (300MW output) battery storage power station at Swardeston, consisting of 120 Tesla megapack units. Hornsea 3 began construction in 2023, and is expected to complete at the end of 2027. In December 2025, Ørsted sold half to Apollo Global Management for $6.1 billion.

The wind farm will be equipped with up to 231 Siemens Gamesa 14-236 DD offshore wind turbines, each with a 14MW capacity.

=== Construction ===
The very wet winter of 2024/25 complicated the installation of the sub-surface onshore cables. Flint cobbles also impacted the horizontal directional drilling for the cables at the shoreline.

The offshore HVDC converter was manufactured in Map Ta Phut, Thailand, then transported to Haugesund, Norway for fit out of the high-voltage electrical equipment.

In February 2026, the first XXL monopile foundations for the project arrived at Teesworks. Each is around 90 m (300 ft) long, between 8 and 11 m (26 and 36 ft) in diameter, and weighs 1,670 tonnes. These were manufactured by Haizea Wind Group in Bilbao, Spain.

In March 2026, installation of the first export cable was completed by Jan De Nul. Consisting of two HVDC cables, it connects the wind farm to an onshore converter station near Swardeston, Norfolk.

=== Environmental impact ===
Concerns have been raised by the RSPB over the impact on bird colonies in the region. 1,500 nest boxes for kittiwakes were built on a pole offshore in 2023, near RSPB Minsmere and Lowestoft.

== Hornsea Project 4 ==
Ørsted put forward a plan to add a fourth area to the Hornsea wind farm in 2018, with the area covering 600 square kilometres (230 sq mi), and being located adjacent, north-west of Hornsea Project 1. During 2018 and 2019, consultation with the local communities which will be affected by the project took place, with a Development Consent Order application originally intended in the first quarter of 2020. However additional consultations and revisions delayed the submission until September 2021, with further analysis needed on the impacts to kittiwake, razorbill and guillemot populations in the Flamborough and Filey Coast Special Protection Area. Part of the site is also scheduled for an underground carbon dioxide storage, leading to conflict over the use of the seabed and the ocean surface.

The project's capacity was unknown by Ørsted due to the ever increasing size of available wind turbines for the project. Government approval for phase four was given by Grant Shapps in July 2023. Pre-construction site enabling works were expected to commence in the first half of 2025 and completion was expected by 2030. On 7 May 2025, Orsted wrote that its planned capacity was 2,400 MW.

On 7 May 2025, Orsted announced that it has decided "to discontinue the Hornsea 4 project [...] in its current form. Since the Contract for Difference (CfD) award [...] in September 2024, the [...] Hornsea 4 project has seen several adverse developments relating to continued increase of supply chain costs, higher interest rates, and an increase in the risk to construct and operate Hornsea 4 on the planned timeline".

== See also ==
- List of offshore wind farms

== Sources ==
- "Round 3 zone appraisal and planning" (PDF). The Crown Estate. 7 May 2010.
- "Round 3 Offshore Wind Site Selection at National and Project Levels" (PDF). The Crown Estate. June 2013.
- ABP mer (March 2009). "Round 3 Zones : High-Level Risk Review of Physical Processes" (PDF). The Crown Estate.

Zone 1

- "Hornsea Offshore Wind Farm (Zone 4) – Project One". The Planning Inspectorate.
  - "Hornsea Project One – Environmental Impact Assessment Scoping Report" (PDF). SMart Wind. November 2010.
  - "Hornsea Project One – Addendum to Environmental Impact Assessment Scoping Report" (PDF). SMart Wind. March 2012.
  - "Hornsea Offshore Wind Farm Project One : Environmental Statement – Non-Technical Summary (7.1a)" (PDF). SMart Wind. July 2013.

Zone 2

- "Hornsea Offshore Wind Farm (Zone 4) – Project Two". The Planning Inspectorate.
  - "Hornsea Project Two Environmental Impact Assessment Scoping Report" (PDF). SMart Wind. October 2012.
  - "Annex 4.5.4 Project One/Project Two Interface (Document Reference 7.4.5.4)" (PDF). Hornsea Offshore Wind Farm Project Two Environmental Statement. January 2015.
