= Offshore Structures (Britain) =

Marine offshore structure foundation manufacture

Coordinates: 54.594785°N 1.250453°W

Offshore Structures (Britain) Ltd.
- Company type: Joint venture
- Industry: Renewable Energy
- Predecessor: Haverton Hill shipyard
- Founded: 2014; 11 years ago
- Founder: Bladt Industries and EEW Group
- Defunct: 2020
- Fate: Closed
- Headquarters: Haverton Hill, United Kingdom
- Area served: North Sea
- Products: Foundations
- Owner: Bladt Industries and EEW Group
- Number of employees: 100 (2014)
- Website: offshorestructures.uk

Offshore Structures (Britain) was a British marine offshore structure foundation manufacturing company that was based at Haverton Hill near Billingham on the north bank of the River Tees. The company was formed as a joint venture between Danish company Bladt Industries and German company EEW Group when it took over the assets of the factory that had been established by TAG Energy Solutions.

It was building structures for offshore wind farms while it was operating. The site has been empty since 2021.

The factory was previously used briefly in the late 2000s by Tees Alliance Group for a prematurely terminated contract to manufacture oil rig substructures. The works was based on the site of the Haverton Hill shipyard, initially operating as the Furness Shipbuilding Co. Ltd., established 1918. Shipbuilding at the yard ended in 1979.

== History ==
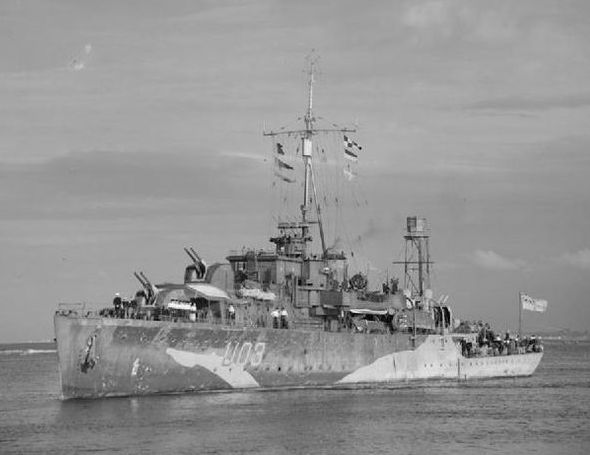
Haverton Hill built HMS Erne (U03) in 1943

The Haverton Hill shipyard opened in 1917 under a wartime construction programme. Shipbuilding took place at the yard from 1919 to 1969 as the Furness Shipbuilding Company under the shipping group Furness Withy. In 1968 the yard was acquired by Swan Hunter who operated the yard for a further decade, and finally by Smith's Dock Co. Ltd who built three ships at the yard in 1978. Shipbuilding ceased in 1979.

In 2008 the shipyard reopened under Tees Alliance Group (TAG) to construct the foundation structure of an oil rig 'SeaDragon 1', initially to be leased to Pemex (Mexico). In 2009 the contract between TAG and the rig development company (Sea Dragon Offshore) was terminated, with the financier (Lloyds TSB) citing financial risk, and the work transferred to a yard in Singapore with previous experience of rig construction.

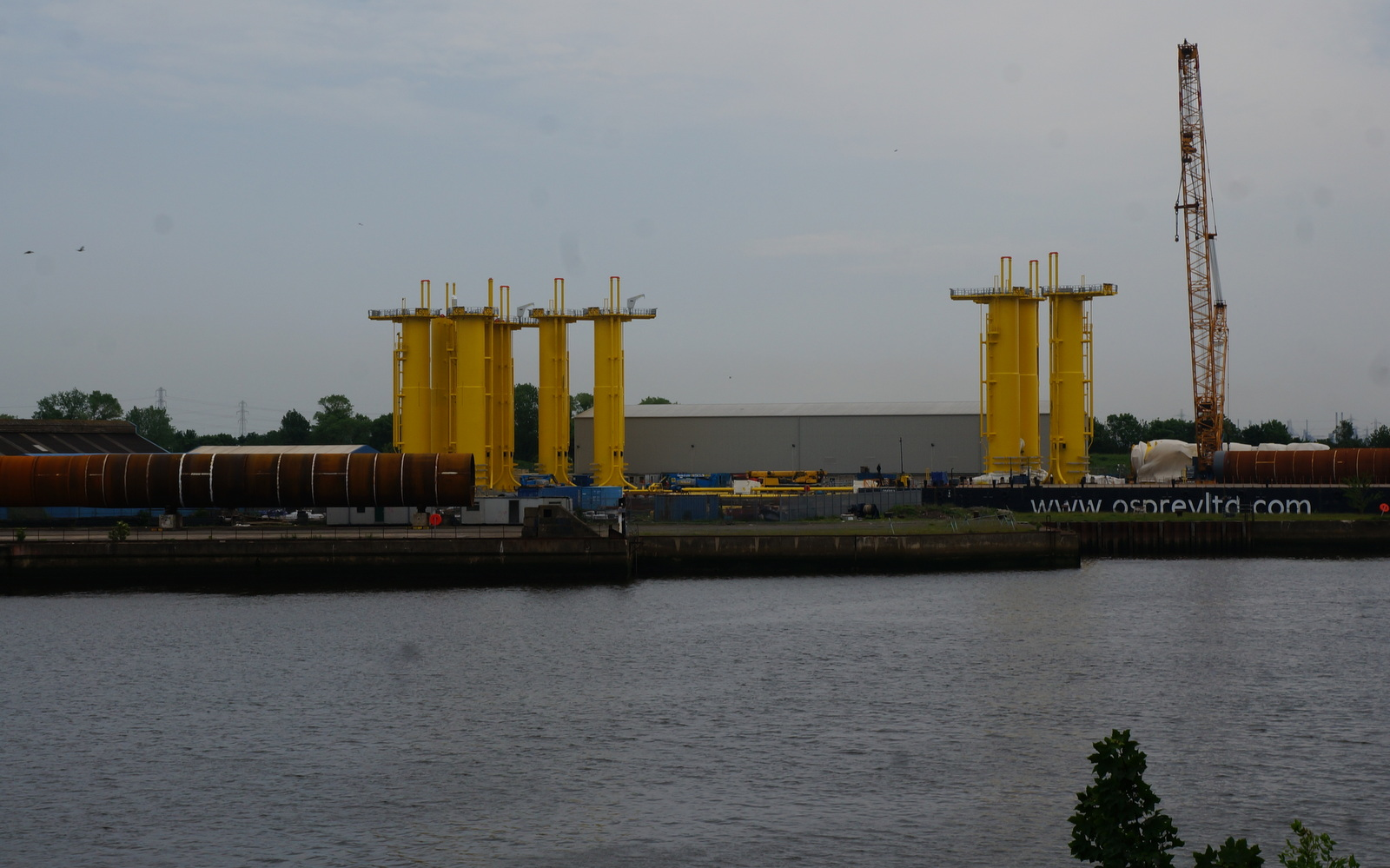
Wind turbine transition pieces at the yard (2014)

TAG Energy Solutions was established in 2010. The company invested in a new 40 by 171 metres (131 by 561 ft) production facility with machines for production of large diameter steel tubes suitable for monopoles, jacket foundations and other offshore structures. In 2013 the company was awarded a contract for monopoles and transition pieces for the Humber Gateway wind farm.

In September 2014 the company was reported entered insolvency with the loss of around 100 jobs, having run up a £61 million debt.

In late 2014 Bladt Industries (Denmark) and EEW (Germany) acquired the assets of Tees Alliance Group Corporate, and formed a joint venture Offshore Structures (Britain) Limited to reuse the TAG Energy facility at Billigham. An initial contract was obtained in Jan 2015 for transition pieces for the Burbo Bank Extension offshore wind farm.

As of mid 2021 the Yard is stripped empty, just a security presence.
