= JDR =

JDR may refer to:

- JDR Cables, an electrical cable manufacturer
- Jack Del Rio (born 1963), American football player and coach
- Jennifer Diane Reitz (born 1959), American writer, webcomic author, and game designer.
- Job demands-resources model (JD-R), in business
- John D. Rockefeller (1839–1937), American businessman and oil tycoon
- Jutland Dragoon Regiment, a regiment of the Royal Danish Army
- Juvenile and domestic relations court, Virginia, United States
