= List of offshore wind farms =

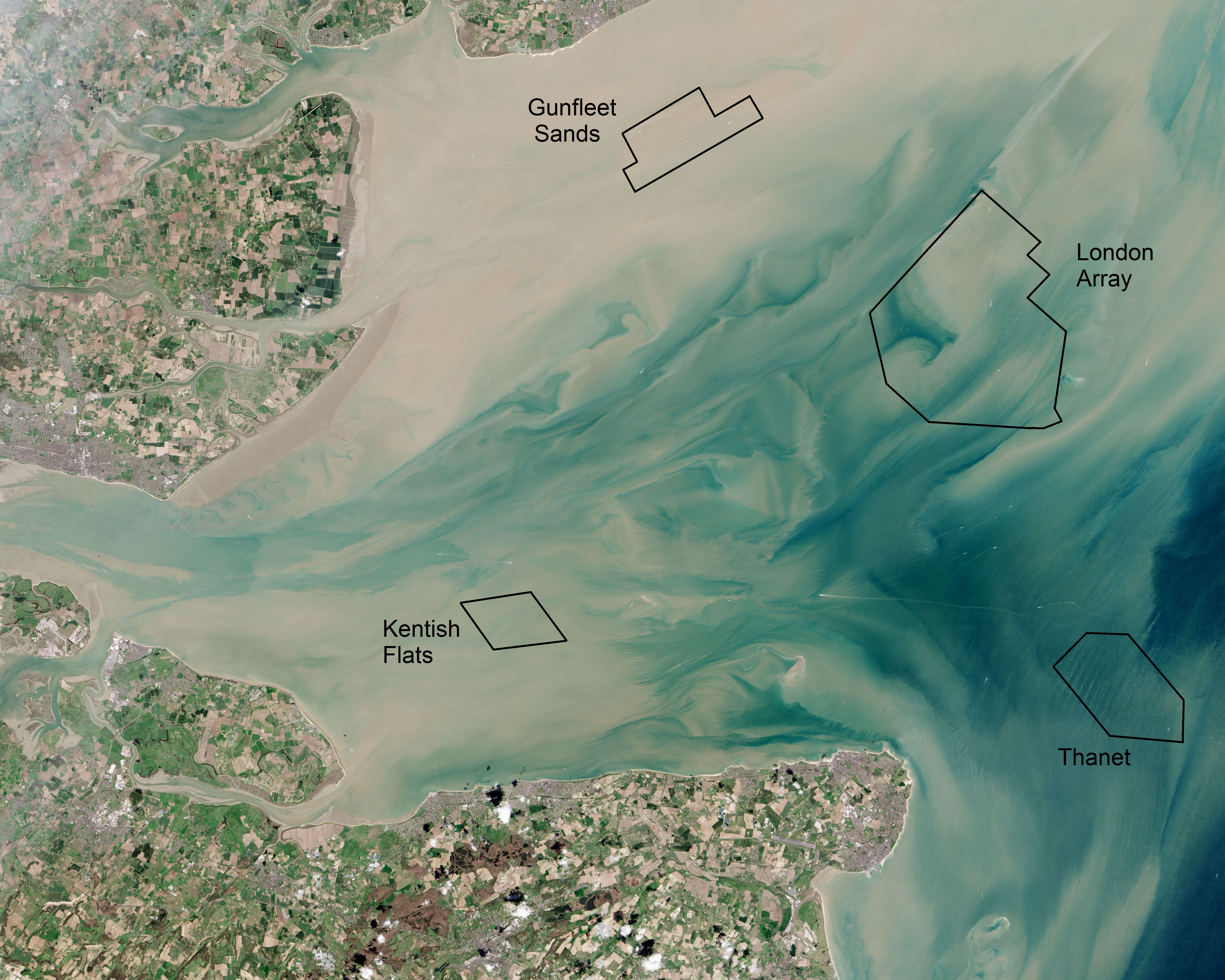
Four offshore wind farms are in the Thames Estuary area: Kentish Flats, Gunfleet Sands, Thanet and London Array. The latter was largest in the world.

Offshore wind farm locations. Locations in gray are under construction.

This article lists the largest offshore wind farms that are currently operational rated by nameplate capacity. It also lists the largest offshore wind farms currently under construction, the largest proposed offshore wind farms, and offshore wind farms with notability other than size.

As of 2022, Hornsea 2 in the United Kingdom is the largest offshore wind farm in the world at 1,386 MW.

== Largest operational offshore wind farms ==
This is a list of offshore wind farms with at least 400 MW nameplate capacity that are currently operational.

Wind farm	Location	Coordinates	Capacity (MW)	Turbines number	Turbines model	Commissioning date	Refs
Hornsea Project Two	United Kingdom	53°54′36″N 1°33′06″E	1,386	165	Siemens Gamesa 8.0-167 DD	2022	
Hornsea Project One	United Kingdom	53°53′06″N 1°47′28″E	1,218	174	Siemens Gamesa SWT-7.0-154	2019	
Seagreen	United Kingdom	56°35′17″N 1°44′28″W	1,075	114	MHI Vestas V164-10 MW	2023	
Moray East	United Kingdom	58°10′01″N 2°41′55″W	950	100	MHI Vestas V164-9.5 MW	2022	
Greater Changhua (1 & 2A)	Taiwan	24.1558°N 119.8694°E	900	111	Siemens Gamesa 8.0-167 DD	2024	
Moray West	United Kingdom	58°05′38″N 2°59′17″W	882	60	Siemens Gamesa 14-222 DD	2025	
Triton Knoll	United Kingdom	53°24′N 0°54′E	857	90	MHI Vestas V164-9.5 MW	2021	
Vineyard Wind	United States	41.03325°N 70.61667°W	804	62	13.6 MW GE Haliade-X	2026	
Hollandse Kust (Zuid) III & IV	Netherlands	52°22′00″N 4°07′00″E	770	70	Siemens Gamesa 11.0-200 DD	2023	
Hollandse Kust (Zuid) I & II	Netherlands	52°22′00″N 4°07′00″E	759	69	Siemens Gamesa 11.0-200 DD	2023	
Hollandse Kust Noord	Netherlands	52°42′54″N 4°15′04″E	759	69	Siemens Gamesa 11.0-200 DD	2023	
Borssele I & II	Netherlands	51°42′N 3°05′E	752	94	Siemens Gamesa 8MW	2020	
Borssele III & IV	Netherlands	51°42′25″N 2°54′45″E	731.5	77	MHI Vestas V164-9.5 MW	2021	
East Anglia ONE	United Kingdom	52°40′N 2°18′E	714	102	Siemens Gamesa SWT-7.0-154	2020	
Walney Extension	United Kingdom	54°02′38″N 3°31′19″W	659	40+47	MHI-Vestas 8.25 MW; Siemens Gamesa SWT-7.0-154	2018	
Yunlin	Taiwan	23.5859°N 120.0300°E	640	80	Siemens Gamesa 8.0-167 DD	2025	
London Array	United Kingdom	51°38′38″N 01°33′13″E	630	175	Siemens Gamesa SWT-3.6-120	2013	
Kriegers Flak	Denmark	55°04′N 13°01′E	605	72	Siemens Gamesa SWT-8.4-167	2021	
Gemini Wind Farm	Netherlands	54°02′10″N 5°57′47″E	600	150	Siemens Gamesa SWT-4.0	2017	
Changfang	Taiwan	24.0030°N 120.1388°E	589	62	MHI Vestas V174-9.5 MW	2024	
Beatrice	United Kingdom	58°08′N 3°04′W	588	84	Siemens Gamesa SWT-7.0-154	2019	
Gode Wind (phases 1+2)	Germany	54°03′N 7°02′E	582	97	Siemens Gamesa SWT-6.0-154	2017	
Gwynt y Môr	United Kingdom	53°27′N 3°35′W	576	160	Siemens Gamesa SWT-3.6-107	2015	
Race Bank	United Kingdom	53°16′30″N 0°50′00″E	573	91	Siemens Gamesa SWT-6.0-154	2018	
Greater Gabbard	United Kingdom	51°53′N 1°56′E	504	140	Siemens Gamesa SWT-3.6-107	2012	
Jiangsu Qidong H1+H2	China	32°7′12″N 122°9′36″E	503	84	Shanghai Electric	2021	
CGN Shanwei Jiazi I	China	22.6015°N 116.0854°E	503	78	MySE6.45-180	2022	
Jieyang Shenquan II	China	22.6673°N 116.3162°E	502	34+16	Shanghai Electric	2022	
Shandong Bozhong B2	China	38.2739°N 118.9225°E	501.5	59		2023	
Shandong Bozhong A	China	38.3003°N 118.5405°E	501	60	CSIC Haizhuang H220-8.35	2022	
Huadian Yangjiang Qingzhou III	China	20.9699°N 111.6080°E	500.6	37+30	MySE6.8-158; MySE8.3-180	2022	
CGN Shanwei Houhu	China	22.7152°N 116.0582°E	500.5	91	MingYang MySE5.5-155	2021	
Guodian Xiangshan 1 phase 2	China		500	41	12 MW units	2025	
Hohe See Hohe See	Germany	54°26′N 6°19′E	497	71	Siemens Gamesa SWT-7.0-154	2019	
Fécamp	France	49°54′15″N 0°13′13″E	497	71	Siemens Gamesa SWT-7.0-154	2024	
Saint-Brieuc	France	48°51′36″N 2°32′06″W	496	62	Siemens Gamesa SG 8.0-167 DD	2023	
Saint-Nazaire Offshore Wind Farm	France	47°09′38″N 2°37′36″W	480	80	GE Haliade 150-6MW	2022	
Baltic Eagle	Germany	54°49′29″N 13°51′42″E	476	50	MHI Vestas V174-9.5 MW	2025	
Neart na Gaoithe	United Kingdom	56°16′04″N 2°19′15″W	450	54	Siemens Gamesa 8.0-167 DD	2025	
Borkum Riffgrund 2	Germany	53°56′49″N 6°29′07″E	450	56	MHI Vestas V164-8.0 MW	2019	
Horns Rev 3	Denmark	55°41′49″N 7°40′09″E	407	49	MHI Vestas V164-8.3 MW	2019	
CGN Shanwei Jiazi II	China	22.6209°N 116.1632°E	403	62	MySE6.45-180	2022	
Dudgeon	United Kingdom	53°14′56″N 1°23′24″E	402	67	Siemens Gamesa SWT-6.0-154	2017	
Veja Mate	Germany	54°N 6°E	402	67	Siemens Gamesa SWT-6.0-154	2017	
CGN Yangjiang Nanpeng Island	China	21.4702°N 112.2545°E	401.5	73	Mingyang MY-5.5 MW	2020	
Anholt	Denmark	56°36′N 11°13′E	400	111	Siemens Gamesa SWT-3.6-120	2013	
BARD Offshore 1	Germany	54°21′30″N 5°58′30″E	400	80	BARD 5.0MW	2013	
Global Tech I	Germany	54°30′00″N 6°21′30″E	400	80	Areva Multibrid M5000 5.0MW	2015	
Rampion	United Kingdom	50°39′53″N 0°16′44″W	400	116	MHI Vestas V112-3.45 MW	2018	
Binhai North H2	China	34°30′00″N 120°20′00″E	400	100	Siemens Gamesa SWT-4.0-120	2018	
CTGNE Yangjiang Shapa - phase II	China	21.3180°N 111.4882°E	400	62	Mingyang MySE6.45-180	2021	
Rudong H6	China		400	100	Siemens Gamesa SWT-4.0-146	2021	
Rudong H10	China		400	100	Siemens Gamesa SWT-4.0-146	2021	
SPIC Rudong H7	China		400	100	Siemens Gamesa SWT-4.0-146	2021	
SPIC Rudong H4	China		400	100	Siemens Gamesa SWT-4.0-146	2021	

== Largest under construction ==
This is a list of wind farms with a nameplate capacity of more than 400 MW currently under construction.

Wind farm	Location	Coordinates	Capacity (MW)	Turbines & model	Completion	Ownership	Refs
Hornsea 3	United Kingdom	53°55′12″N 1°19′48″E	2,900	231 × Siemens Gamesa SG 14-236 DD	2027	Ørsted	
Coastal Virginia Offshore Wind	United States	36.8878333°N 75.4973333°W	2,640	176 × Siemens Gamesa 14-222 DD	2027	Dominion (50%), Stonepeak (50%)	
Baltica 2	Poland		1,498	107 × Siemens Gamesa 14-222	2027	Ørsted, PGE	
Sofia	United Kingdom	54°58′46″N 2°13′48″E	1,400	100 × Siemens Gamesa 14 MW	2026	RWE	
East Anglia Three	United Kingdom		1,330	95 × Siemens Gamesa SG 14-236 DD	2026	Masdar, ScottishPower Renewables	
Dogger Bank A	United Kingdom	54°44′56″N 1°55′48″E	1,235	95 × GE Haliade-X 13 MW	2026	SSE (40%), Equinor (40%), Vårgrønn (20%)	
Dogger Bank B	United Kingdom	54°59′12″N 1°39′44″E	1,235	95 × GE Haliade-X 13 MW	2026	SSE (40%), Equinor (40%), Vårgrønn (20%)	
Dogger Bank C	United Kingdom	55.02233°N 2.71059°E	1,218	87 × GE Haliade-X 14 MW	2027	SSE, Equinor, Eni	
Baltic Power	Poland		1,140	76 x Vestas V236-15.0 MW	2026	Orlen, Northland Power	
Inch Cape	United Kingdom	56.4947°N 2.2065°W	1,080	72 × Vestas V236-15.0 MW	2027	ESB (50%), Red Rock Renewables (50%)	
Thor	Denmark		1,080	72 × Vestas V236-15.0 MW	2027	RWE, Norges Bank Investment Management	
He Dreiht	Germany	54°21′N 6°12′E	960	64 × Vestas V236-15 MW	2026	EnBW	
Sunrise Wind	United States		924	84 × Siemens Gamesa 11 MW	2026	Ørsted	
Borkum Riffgrund 3	Germany	54°02′35″N 6°11′46″E	913	83 × Siemens Gamesa 11.0-200 DD	2026	Ørsted	
Empire Wind 1	United States	40.329226°N 73.507861°W	810	54 × Vestas V236-15 MW	2027	Equinor	
Ecowende	Netherlands		760	52 × Vestas V236-15 MW	2026	Shell, Eneco, Chubu Electric Power	
Bałtyk 2	Poland		720	50 × Siemens Gamesa SG 14-236	2028	Polenergia, Equinor	
Revolution Wind	United States	41.124974°N 71.38818°W	704	64 × Siemens Gamesa 11.0-200 DD	2026	Ørsted (50%), GIP/ Skyborn Renewables (50%)	
Hai Long 3	Taiwan		504	36 × Siemens Gamesa 14-222 DD	2027	Mitsui, Yushan Energy, Gentari International Renewables, Northland Power	
Calvados	France	49°27′22″N 0°29′53″W	448	64 × Siemens Gamesa SWT-7.0-154	2027	EDF, Skyborn Renewables	

== Largest proposed ==
The following table lists largest offshore wind farm areas (by nameplate capacity) that are only at a proposal stage, and have achieved at least some of the formal consents required before construction can begin.

Wind farm	Location	Coordinates	Capacity (MW)	Projected completion	Consents	Refs
Chaozhou	China		43,300		Projected to start work before 2025. Capacity refers to two projects.	
Sinan Korea Offshore	South Korea		8,200	2030	Project approved in 2021. Estimated cost: €36 billion.	
Berwick Bank	United Kingdom		4,100	2027	SSE merged Berwick Bank (2.3GW) and Marr Bank (1.85GW) into single project. Planning application will be sent to Scottish government in Spring 2022. Scottish Government consented project in July 2025. SSE missed AR6 due to consent delays.	
Ossian	United Kingdom		3,600		Consent application for a floating wind farm submitted in July 2024.	
East Anglia Hub (formerly Norfolk Bank)	United Kingdom		3,100	2026	ScottishPower Renewables merged East Anglia TWO (900 MW), East Anglia THREE (1,400 MW) and East Anglia ONE North (800MW) into single hub. Anticipated project start in 2022. Project completion anticipated in 2026.	
Med Wind	Italy		2,800	2030	Floating offshore wind farm. Scoping procedure completed in 2021. Construction to start in 2025. Expected project completion in 2030.	
Hornsea Project Four	United Kingdom		2,600			
Southwest Offshore	South Korea		2,500		Phase 1 (60 MW), Phase 2 (400 MW), Phase 3 (2000 MW)	
Hornsea Project Three	United Kingdom		2,400		Crown Estate Round 3	
SouthCoast Wind	United States		2,400 in two phases	TBA	BOEM	
Wilmington East & Wilmington West Wind Farm	United States		2,250		TotalEnergy Renewables USA	
Formosa III	Taiwan		2,000		Undergoing environmental impact assessment and approvals which are expected to be completed between 2021 and 2025.	
IJmuiden Ver Alpha	Netherlands		2,000	2029		
IJmuiden Ver Beta	Netherlands		2,000	2029		
IJmuiden Ver Gamma	Netherlands		2,000			
OWF Bałtyk I	Poland		1,560		Connection to national grid approved in 2021	
Atlantic Shores	United States		1,510	2028	NJBPU	
Norfolk Vanguard East	United Kingdom		1,400		Planning consent granted on 11 February 2022. Offshore works expected to begin in 2025. Will use V236-15 MW turbines.	
Norfolk Vanguard West	United Kingdom		1,400		Will use V236-15 MW turbines Offshore works are expected to begin in 2025.	
Norfolk Boreas	United Kingdom		1,400		Planning Consent Granted on 10 December 2021. RWE restarted project in December 2023. Offshore works are expected to begin in 2025. Will use V236-15 MW turbines	
Rampion 2	United Kingdom		1,200		Concept/early planning. Planning application expected 2022.	
Beacon Wind	United States		1,230	2028	NYSERDA	
Storgrundet	Sweden		1,000		Environmental permit granted in September 2023 to Skyborn Renewables	
Nordlicht I	Germany		980	2027	Vattenfall	
Skipjack	United States		966	2027	Ørsted	
He Dreiht	Germany		960	2025	Aug 28, 2024: All 64 foundations installed	
Gennaker	Germany		927	2026	Skyborn Renewables	
Park City Wind	United States		804	2025	Connecticut DEEP	
Kitty Hawk Wind	United States		800	2026	800 MW in Phase 1, proposed total of 2500 MW BOEM	
Hollandse Kust (West) VII	Netherlands		750	2026	RWE	
OWF Bałtyk II	Poland		720	2026	Construction anticipated in 2025/2026	
OWF Bałtyk III	Poland		720	2026	Construction anticipated in 2025/2026	
Baltic Sea Energy Island I	Lithuania	55.916667°N 20.333333°E	700	2028	Expected to be finished by 2028. Several investors who submitted bids are currently under evaluation by Lithuanian government.	
Baltic Sea Energy Island II	Lithuania		700	2030	Expected to be finished by 2030 after first wind park completed	
Noirmoutier	France		488	2025	Delivery and commissioning expected for 2025. Project will consist of 61 Siemens Gamesa 8.0-167 DD.	

== Largest cancelled wind farms ==
Ocean Wind 1	United States	39.366111°N 74.414167°W	1,100	2024	NJBPU
Ocean Wind 2	United States		1,148	2027	NJBPU

== Other notable offshore wind farms ==
Wind farm	Country	Coordinates	Year	Notability	Refs
Vindeby	Denmark	54°58′N 11°08′E	1991	First offshore wind farm; 11 × Bonus 450 kW. Decommissioned in 2017.	
Beatrice	United Kingdom	58°7′48″N 3°4′12″W	2007	Deepest fixed-foundation at 45-metre water depth. 2 × Senvion 5 MW prototype turbines	
Yttre Stengrund	Sweden	56°12′N 16°00′E	2001	First offshore wind farm to be decommissioned (in November 2015)	
Fryslân	Netherlands	53°00′00″N 5°16′00″E	2021	Largest freshwater wind farm with a total capacity of 382.7 MW	
Hywind	Norway		2009	First full-scale, deep-water floating turbine: Siemens 2.3 MW turbine in 220 meter-deep water	
Hywind Scotland	United Kingdom	57°28′59″N 1°21′00″W	2017	First full-scale, deep-water floating wind farm, at 30 MW capacity	
Hywind Tampen	Norway	61°20′02″N 2°15′34″E	2022	Currently the largest deep-water floating wind farm with 88 MW capacity. Built specifically to power offshore oil and gas platforms.	

== See also ==
- Jackup rig
- List of largest wind farms in the world
- Lists of wind farms
- Wind power by country
