= Claxton Engineering Ltd =

Engineering and services company based in Norfolk

Claxton Engineering Services
- Company type: Private limited (Non-trading)
- Industry: Oil and gas engineering services
- Founded: Great Yarmouth, England (1985)
- Headquarters: Great Yarmouth, England, United Kingdom
- Area served: Global
- Revenue: £60,000,000 (2022)
- Number of employees: 270 (2022)
- Website: https://www.claxtonengineering.com/

Claxton Engineering Services Ltd is an engineering and service company registered in the United Kingdom and has its headquarters in Great Yarmouth, UK, with offices also in Scotland, Norway, USA, Singapore and the UAE.

The company is an accredited and registered organisation with the Institution of Mechanical Engineers.

== History ==
Claxton was founded in Great Yarmouth in 1985 and in 1999 became part of Acteon Group Ltd.

In 2019 Acteon acquired Proserv's Field Technology Services business unit which merged with Claxton, providing a global footprint. In 2020 another Acteon company, Conductor Installation Services also merged into Claxton.

Claxton provides services across the energy industry, including offshore decommissioning, and fixed wind installation. Claxton has supplied drilling risers for many major projects around the world and has achieved safety milestones for its operations. Some of the company's projects involve developing new components for the oil and gas industry, for example, technical innovations for drilling risers.

Claxton has received several industry awards, including the Queen's Award for Export Achievement (1998) and the Spirit of Enterprise Great Engineering Company Award (2009).
