= MENCK =

German specialist offshore engineering company

MENCK GmbH
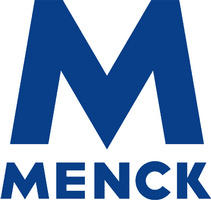
- Company type: Private limited (Non-trading)
- Industry: Subsea Services
- Founded: 1868
- Headquarters: Kaltenkirchen, Germany
- Area served: Global
- Key people: Bernhard Bruggaier, Managing Director Fabian Hippe, Managing Director
- Products: Hydraulic Pile Driving Hammers
- Number of employees: 140
- Website: http://www.menck.com/

MENCK GmbH is a specialist offshore engineering company and part of the Acteon Group Ltd. Headquartered in Kaltenkirchen, North Germany, MENCK GmbH provides specialised hydraulic pile-driving services for the oil and gas industry and in the construction of other offshore structures such as bridges and wind farms.

== History ==
MENCK GmbH can trace its roots back to 1868 when it was established in Hamburg by Johannes Menck and Diedrich Hambrock. The company started out as a steam and diesel shovel builder, but after the Second World War it focused more on the production of diesel hammers. In 1966 Menck was bought by the US company Koehring, which went bankrupt in 1978. In 1992 MENCK GmbH was formed and acquired by Jay Ray McDermott the following year. The company moved its headquarters to Kaltenkirchen, Germany in 2002 and was acquired by the Acteon Group Ltd in 2003. MENCK GmbH was the first-ever winner of the Ben C.Gerwick Award in 2008.

== Major projects ==
Since 1996, MENCK GmbH has been involved in some major construction projects across the world including:

- Tokyo Bay Bridge, Japan (1992)
- Tagus Bridge, Portugal (1996)
- Jamuna Bridge, Bangladesh (1996)
- Utgrunden Wind Park, Sweden (2000)
- Rion Antitirion Bridge, Greece (2001)
- Samso Wind Park, Denmark (2002)
- Woodrow Wilson Bridge, USA (2002)
- Benicia-Martinez Bridge, USA (2003)
- North Hoyle Wind Park, UK (2004)
- Container terminal Bremerhaven, Germany (2006)
- Q7 Wind Park, Netherlands (2007)
- Jade-Weser-Port, Germany (2008)
- Gunfleet Sands Wind Park, UK (2009)
- Padma Bridge, Bangladesh (2015)
