= Tonn Nua =

Proposed offshore windfarm in Ireland

- Country: Ireland
- Location: Celtic Sea
- Status: Proposed
- Owner: Helvick Head Offshore Wind DAC

Wind farm
- Type: Offshore

Power generation
- Nameplate capacity: 900 MW

External links
- Website: www.tonnnua.ie

Tonn Nua (lit. 'New Wave' in Irish) is a proposed 900 MW offshore wind farm located off the coast of County Waterford in Ireland. The project will be developed by a joint venture between the Irish state-owned ESB Group, and the Danish multinational energy company Ørsted, which is the largest offshore wind farm developer in the world.

If developed, the wind farm will generate enough electricity to power the equivalent of around 800,000 Irish homes. It is expected to enter operation in the 2030s.

== Background ==
In July 2023, the Department of Climate, Energy and the Environment (DCEE) selected the south coast as the location of the first Designated Maritime Area Plan (DMAP) Proposal.

The South Coast Designated Maritime Area Plan (SC-DMAP) approved in October 2024 identified four 'Maritime Areas' off the coast of Waterford for the development of offshore renewable energy (ORE); Maritime Area A, or Tonn Nua, was selected as the site for Ireland’s second offshore auction under the Offshore Renewable Electricity Support Scheme (ORESS). With the announcement of the provisional results of the auction on 26 November 2025, Helvick Head Offshore Wind DAC, a consortium of ESB and Ørsted, was awarded the rights to develop the site; this was confirmed by the final result of the auction on 9 December.

== See also ==
- Arklow Bank Wind Park
- Wind power in Ireland
