= Gunfleet Sands Offshore Wind Farm =

Offshore wind farm near Clacton-on-Sea, England

Gunfleet Sands 1 & 3
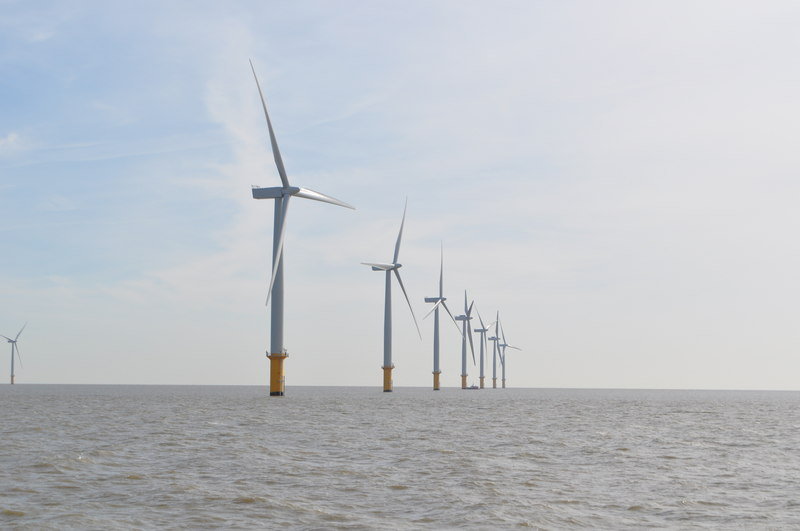
- The farm from a passing ship, 30 September 2010
- Country: England, United Kingdom
- Location: Northern Thames Estuary 7 km (4.3 mi) off Clacton-on-Sea, Essex
- Coordinates: 51°44′22″N 1°10′28″E
- Status: Operational
- Construction began: 2008
- Commission date: 2010
- Owners: Orsted (51%); Marubeni Corporation / Bank of Japan (remainder)

Wind farm
- Type: Offshore
- Rotor diameter: 107 m (351 ft)

Power generation
- Units operational: 48
- Make and model: Siemens Wind Power SWT-3.6-107
- Units planned: 1 × 3.6 MW
- Nameplate capacity: 172MW
- Capacity factor: ~30-35%

External links
- Website: www.dongenergy.com/gunfleetsands/Pages/Index.aspx
- Commons: Related media on Commons

Wind farm layout

Gunfleet Sands Offshore Wind Farm is a 172 MW wind farm about 7 kilometres (4.3 mi) off the Clacton-on-Sea coast in the Northern Thames Estuary.

The 108 MW Gunfleet Sands 1 wind farm gained planning consent in 2003/4; in 2006 DONG Energy (now Ørsted) acquired the project and submitted an application for a second 64 MW windfarm Gunfleet Sands 2 adjacent to the first, which received consent in 2008. Construction of both mounting Siemens Wind Power SWT-3.6-107 turbines took place between 2008 and 2010.

In 2010 planning began on a demonstration project Gunfleet Sands 3, used to test Siemens' 6 MW wind turbine model; two such turbines were installed in 2013.

== Gunfleet Sands 1 & 2 ==
Gunfleet Sands 1 & 2 are 7 km southeast of Clacton-on-Sea, Essex; in water at depths of 2 to 15 m (6 ft 7 in to 49 ft 3 in) (given spring-to-neap tidal range of about 4.6 m); Gunfleet 1 consists of 30 turbines in a 5×6 array, whilst Gunfleet 2 consists of a 9×2 array adjacent, to the southeast; the installed capacities are 108 and 64 MW respectively. The average wind speed is 8.8 m/s (29 ft/s) at 60 m elevation.

The turbines connect to a 33 kV offshore substation, which steps up the transmission voltage to 132 kV; the export cable makes landfall at Holland Haven (next to Holland-on-Sea), and underground cables connect it to the National Grid at the Cooks Green substation.

=== Development ===
Such development near Clacton-on-Sea began in 1996 under Windmaster Developments; Windmaster was acquired by Enron in 2000, and passed to General Electric (GE Wind Energy) in 2002. A Round 1 concession for the development was awarded in 2001, and planning consents obtained in 2003/4.

In June 2006 a consent application and environmental statement was submitted to the Department of Trade and Industry for permission to build and operate an extension (Gunfleet Sands 2) to the consented project: up to 22 further turbines with an additional capacity of 64 MW. In December 2006 DONG Energy acquired the 100-megawatt "Gunfleet 1" project from GE.

A contract for 30 Siemens Wind Power 3.6 MW turbines was signed in April 2007.

The application for Gunfleet Sands 2 rested with decision maker the Department for Business Enterprise and Regulatory Reform in June 2007, who gave its permission the next year.

=== Construction ===
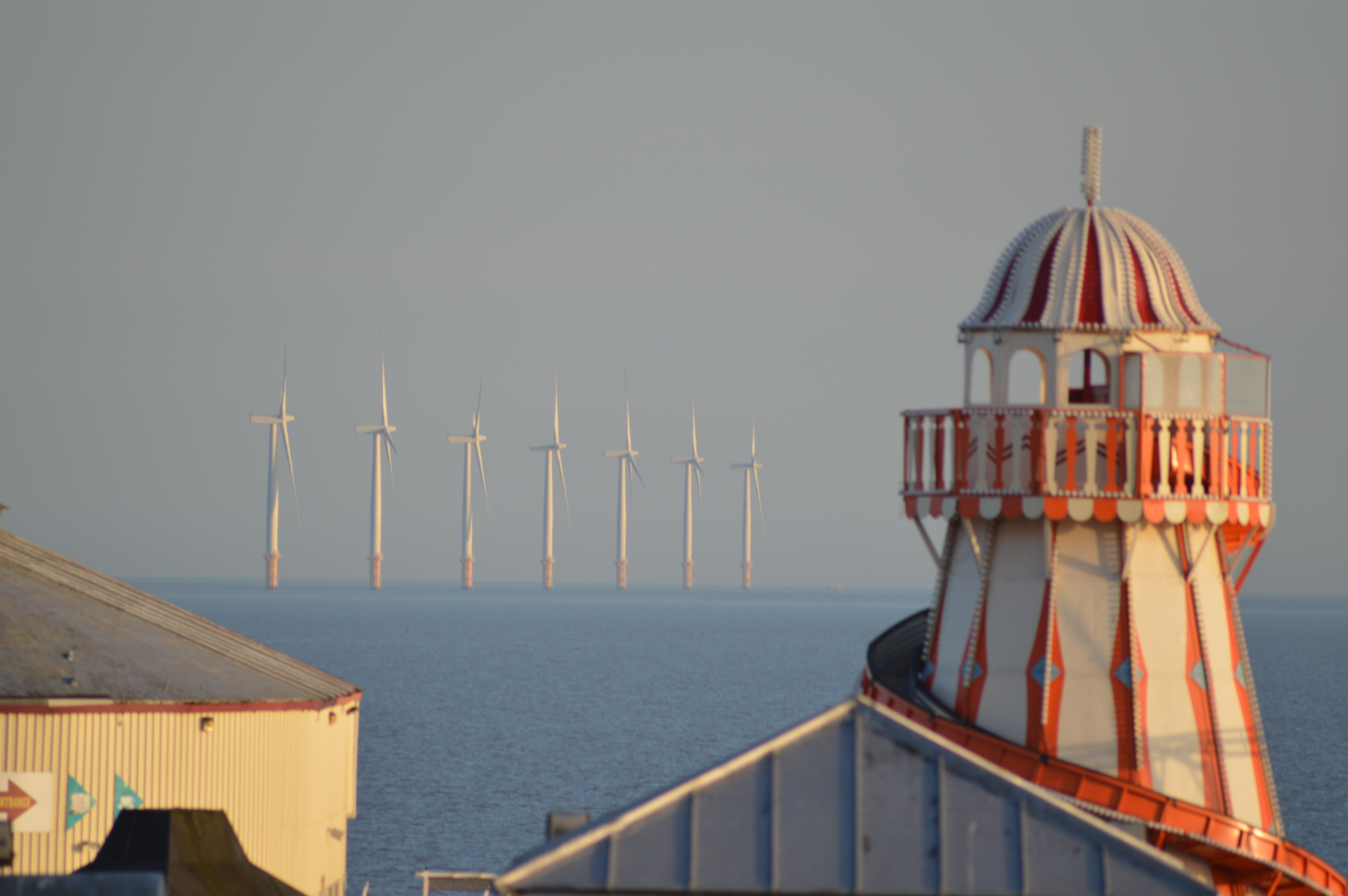
Turbines visible from Clacton-on-Sea beyond Clacton Pier

Construction began in 2008, with initial work including onshore infrastructure and cable installation. A formal groundbreaking ceremony was held in April 2008. The first turbine was installed in April 2009.

MT Højgaard was contracted to instal the monopile foundations; work started in October 2008; Sif supplied the monopiles and transition pieces, and Smulders supplied the wind turbine foundations,

The cabling was supplied by Prysmian, Bladt Industries constructed the offshore monopile substation superstructure, with electrical equipment supplied by Areva T&D and ABB Group.

Construction of the wind farm was delayed, due to cable layer Oceanteam going into administration in May 2009 and the breakdown of liftboat KS Titan 2.

Electrical generation began in August 2009. The wind farm was fully operational by March 2010 and was formally opened on 15 June 2010 by Anders Eldrup (DONG Energy) and the UK's Energy Minister Charles Hendry. Cost of the development was 4 billion Danish Kroner. Large-scale development of British wind farms was enabled by their kickstart subsidies: set in 2010 at a long term rate of 1.20 Danish Kroner per kWh, compared to about 0.50 Kroner (Horns Rev 2) in Denmark.

An operations and servicing center was built in Brightlingsea, Essex where a former boatyard stood.

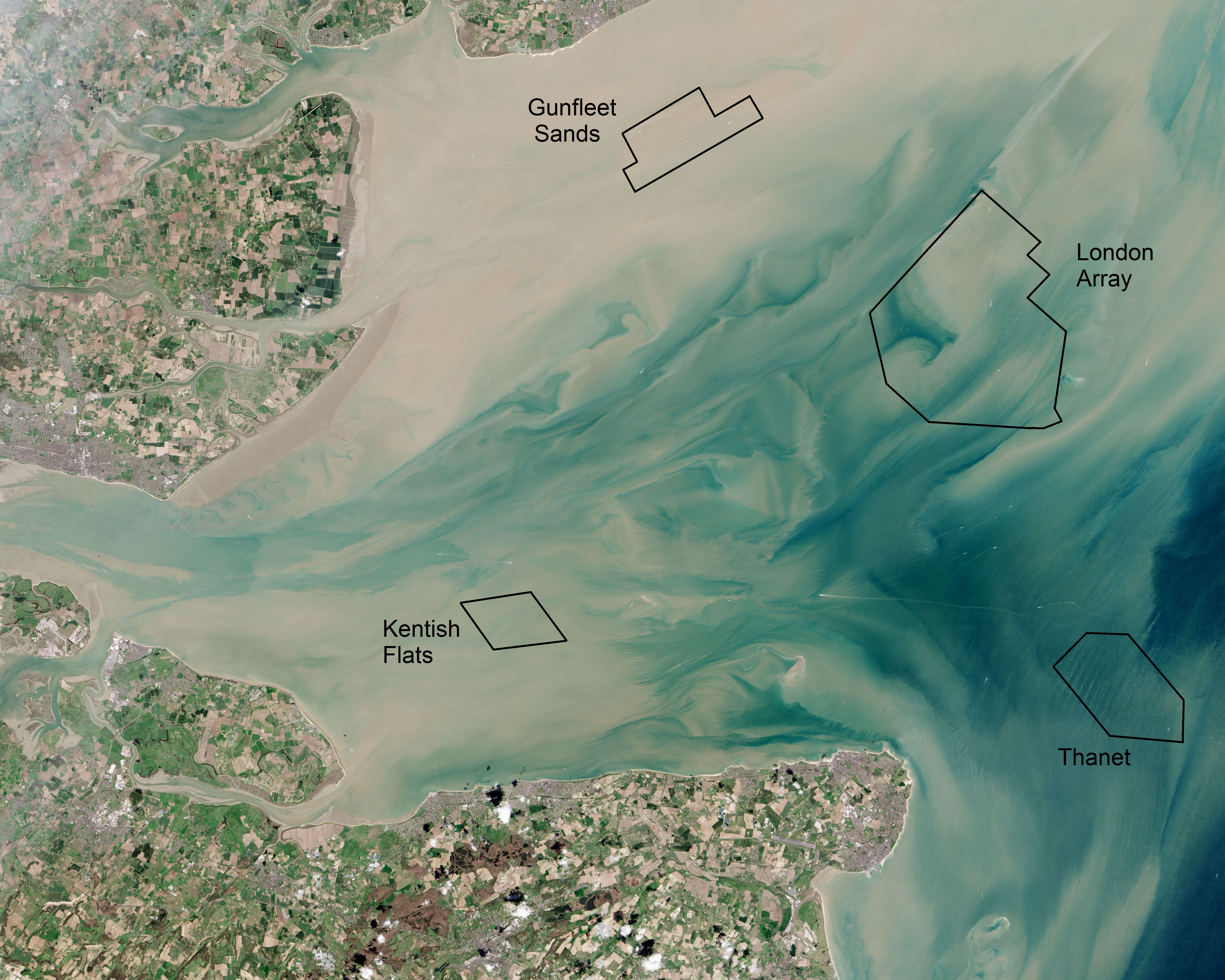
Satellite image of the Thames Estuary with Gunfleet Sands top left.

=== Operational history ===
The wind farm produced between 450 and 520 GWh between 2010 and 2012, with a capacity factor of 31–35% (2011/12). Its levelised cost has been put at £122 per MWh.

The transmission assets were divested in July 2011 to TC Gunfleet Sands OFTO Limited due to regulatory change.

In September 2011 Marubeni Corporation acquired a 49.9% shareholding of the farm for £200 million. In 2013 Marubeni divested part of its stake to the Development Bank of Japan.

During the St Jude storm of October 2013, wind speeds of 65 metres per second (150 mph) were measured at the wind farm.

== Gunfleet Sands 3 ==
Gunfleet Sands 3
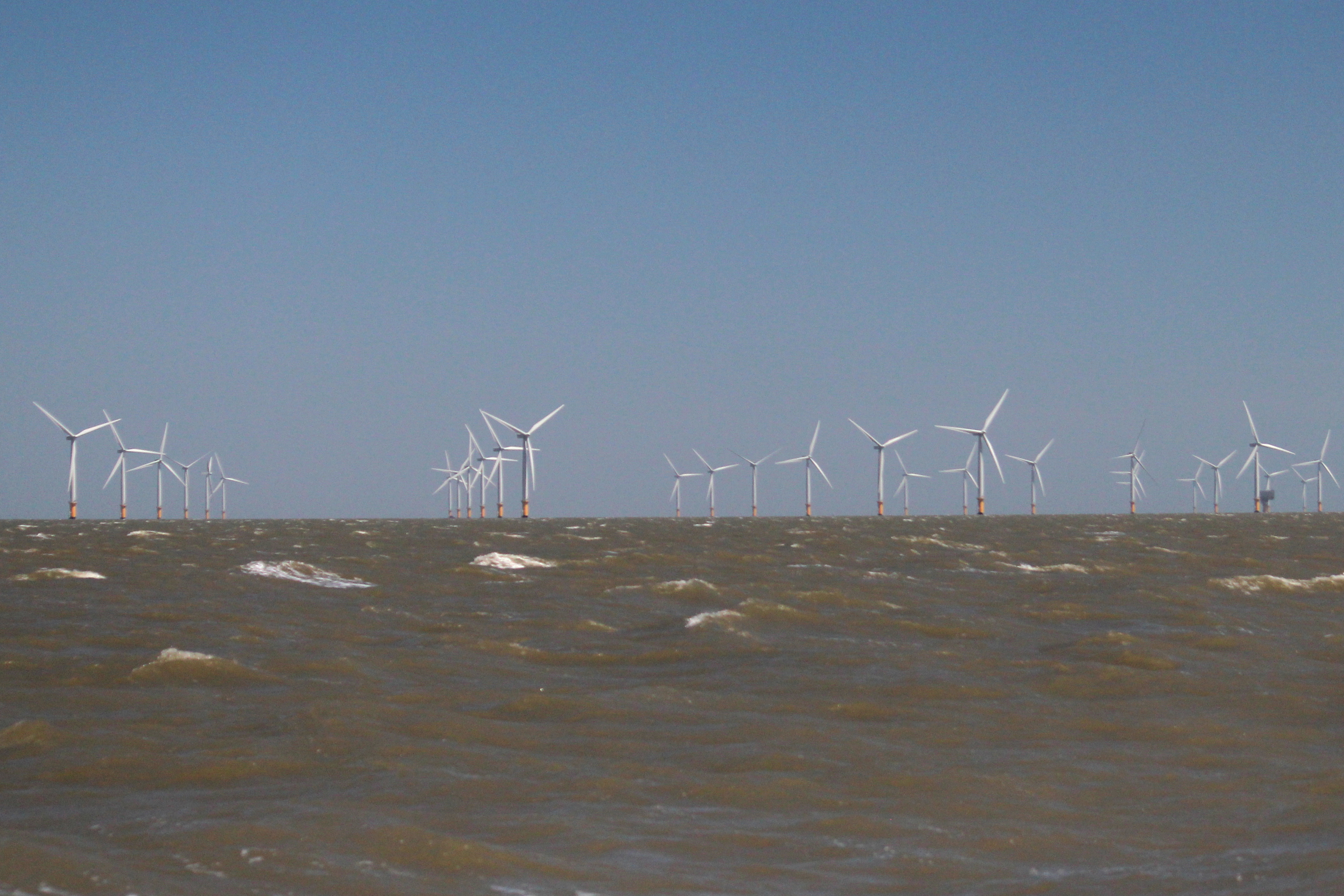
- Official name: Gunfleet Sands demonstration project
- Country: United Kingdom
- Location: Gunfleet Sands
- Coordinates: 51.703°N 1.191°E
- Status: Operational
- Commission date: 2010
- Owners: Development Bank of Japan; JERA; Ørsted

Wind farm
- Type: Offshore
- Rotor diameter: 107 m (351 ft)

Power generation
- Units operational: 2
- Make and model: Siemens Wind Power SWT-6.0-120
- Units planned: 1 × 3.6 MW
- Nameplate capacity: 172 MW

External links
- Website: www.dongenergy.com/gunfleetsands/Pages/Index.aspx
- Commons: Related media on Commons

=== Ambit ===
A planning application for the Gunfleet Sands 3 - Demonstration Project (GFS 3) was submitted in 2010. The project consisted of a wind farm about 1 km^{2} (0.39 sq mi) 8.5 km southeast of Clacton. It was for testing new wind farm equipment ready for the Round 3 wind farm letting process. Two wind turbine installations were proposed.

The development required a separate export cable and grid connection to the prior farm; a planning application for the onshore electrical facilities and cabling was submitted in November 2011.

=== Suppliers ===
Inter-array and export cables (at 33 kV) were supplied by JDR Cables.

The monopile foundations and transition pieces were supplied by Bladt Industries and installed by Ballast Nedam in 2012. Two Siemens 6MW turbines were installed in January 2013 by A2SEA.

=== Productivity ===
The site began generating power in April 2013. A blade replacement took place in mid 2013 after one of the tips was damaged. The facility was officially opened on 12 September 2013 by UK Energy Minister Greg Barker.

== See also ==
- Wind power in the United Kingdom
- List of offshore wind farms in the United Kingdom
- List of offshore wind farms in the North Sea
- List of offshore wind farms
