= Gode Wind Farm =

German cluster of offshore wind farms in the North Sea

- Country: Germany
- Coordinates: 54°03′N 7°02′E
- Status: Operational
- Commission date: June 2017
- Owner: Ørsted

Wind farm
- Distance from shore: 40 km (25 mi)

Power generation
- Units operational: 55 (Gode Wind 1); 42 (Gode Wind 2); 23 (Gode Wind 3)
- Make and model: Siemens Wind Power: 6 & 11 MW direct-drive
- Nameplate capacity: 830 MW (total); 330 MW (Gode Wind 1); 252 MW (Gode Wind 2); 253 MW (Gode Wind 3)

Wind farm layout

Gode Wind 1, 2, and 3 are offshore wind farms located north-west of Norderney in the German sector of North Sea. They are owned by Ørsted. All three are operational by March 2025.

The projects were originally developed by PNE Wind AG who had received approvals for Gode Wind 1 and 2 from Germany's Federal Agency for Marine Shipping and Hydrography. In August 2012, the projects were acquired by Ørsted (then named DONG Energy).

== Planning ==
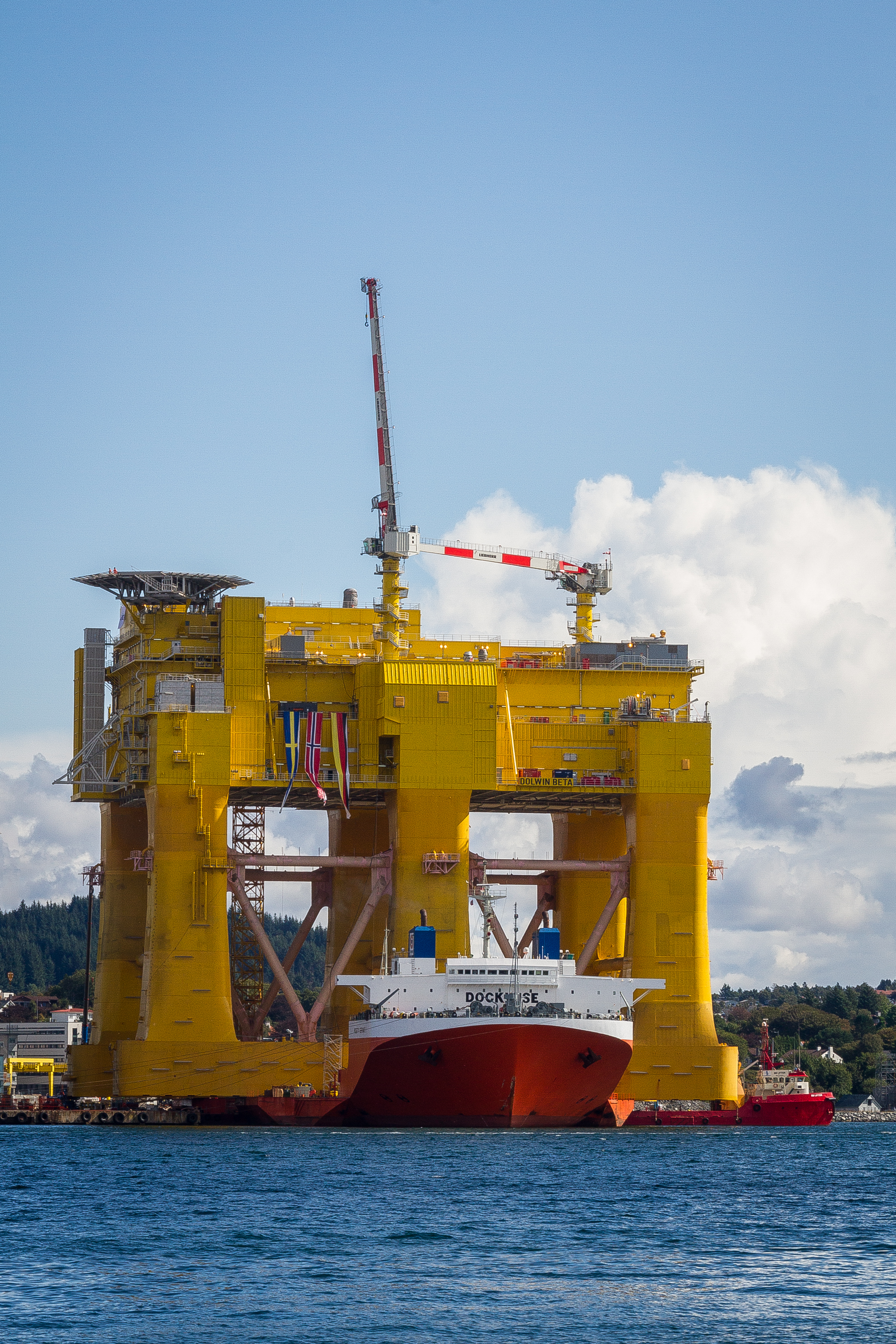
The transformer station Dolwin Beta being transported

Gode Wind's location in the wind farms of the German Bight

The combined capacity of the three projects will be up to 900 MW. Gode 1 has a capacity of 332 MW, Gode 2 has a capacity of 252 MW, and Gode 3 has a capacity of 250 MW, receiving €81/MWh. Originally REpower Systems was to supply 54 6-MW turbines for Gode 1 and Vestas was to supply 84 3-MWturbines for Gode 2. These deals were re-tendered by Ørsted S, which has contracted 154 direct-drive 6MW turbines from Siemens Wind Power. The cable connection is 900 MW HVDC, capable of connecting other wind farms, and connection to shore grid is guaranteed by TenneT. The underwater noise was monitored during construction. The platform called Dolwin Beta was installed in August 2015.

== Gode Wind 1 & 2 ==
On 18 November 2013, Ørsted announced the decision to invest €2.2 billion in Gode 1 & 2. The wind farm is eligible for the Stauchungsmodell support regime, and the electricity price is fixed for 10 years. Bladt Industries will supply the foundations, with a diameter of 6 meters. Gode 1 & 2 consist of a total of 97 Siemens SWT-6.0-154 turbines generating up to 582 MW. These two projects were officially commissioned in June 2017. Gode Wind 3 uses 11 MW turbines.

On 24 April 2023, general cargo ship Petra L collided with a wind turbine at Orsted’s Gode Wind 1 offshore wind farm. No persons were injured in the incident. Further investigations have already been launched. The cargo ship itself did not directly contact the maritime surveillance, but Orsted’s in-house control center has documented the incident. The offshore wind turbine involved has been taken out of operation for further investigation,” a spokesperson for Ørsted Wind said.

== See also ==
- Wind power in Germany
- List of offshore wind farms
