= Menck =

German manufacturer (1868–1978)

Menck & Hambrock
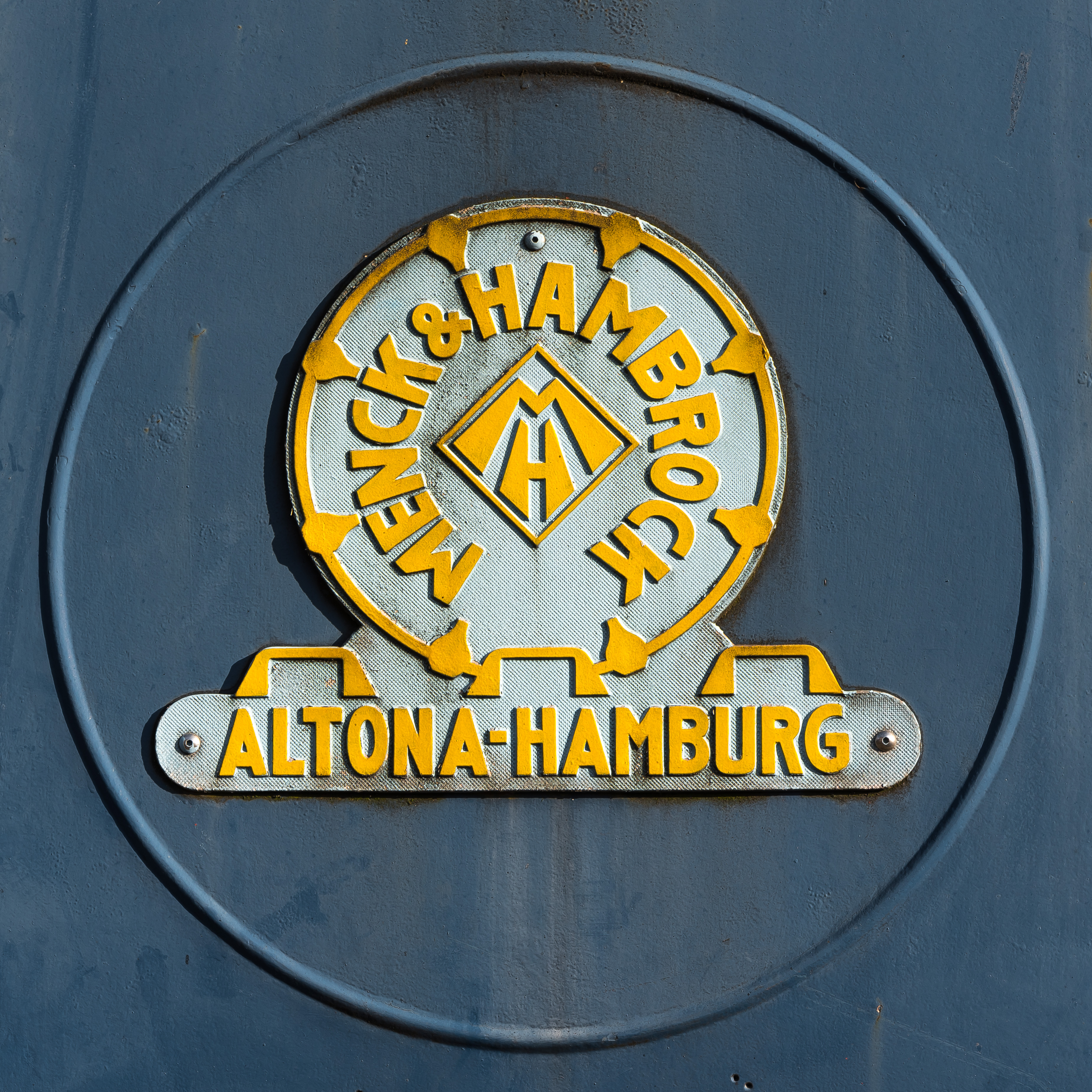
- Logo
- Industry: Machinery
- Founded: 1868 in Hamburg, Germany
- Founders: Johannes Menck & Diedrich Hambrock
- Defunct: 1978
- Fate: Bankruptcy
- Successor: MENCK GmbH
- Area served: Worldwide
- Products: Excavators
- Owners: Johannes Menck & Diedrich Hambrock
- Number of employees: 2000

Menck & Hambrock (also known as Menck) was a German manufacturer of earth moving and ramming equipment and once one of the world's leading companies. They were based in central Altona Ottensen, a part of Hamburg. Today the company operates as MENCK GmbH.

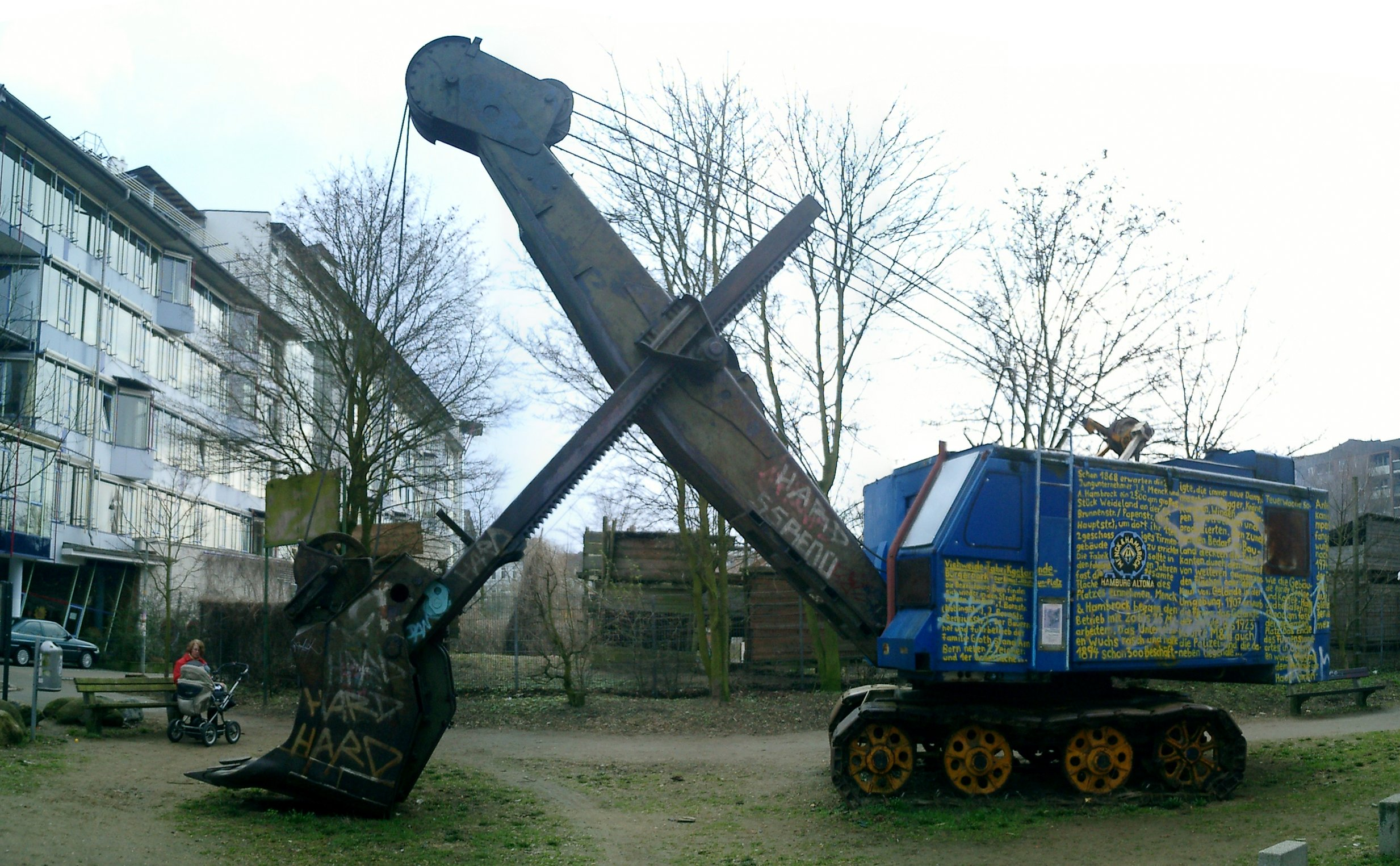
1954 M152 Excavator Monument in Altona

== Beginnings ==
The company was founded in 1868 by Johannes Menck and Diedrich Hambrock to build boilers.

== The 1930s and the Diesel Era ==
In 1933, following the Caterpillar 60, Menck designed the first German bulldozer. With co-operation from Hanomag Universal Diesel, they designed the express excavator series of Mo, mA, MT, Mc and MD. Menck drove the design and development of earth-scraping devices which served a new market. Invented in 1939, the unique Schürfkübelraupe, which was produced by Menck into the 70's, is now built by a Japanese manufacturer under licence.

== After World War II ==
After the Second World War, pressure from the Occupation Powers and the West German Federal Government urged the company to switch capacities from production of weapons to excavator and crane building, as this equipment was urgently needed. Reconstruction of a demolished Central Europe was paramount, and so Menck continued, first with the aforementioned series of excavators and then. starting in 1948, with a completely new line with designations such as M152, M75, M60 and M90.

== Present day ==
In 1966 Menck was bought by the US company Koehring and declared bankruptcy in 1978. Many Menck developments were taken over by other companies. Menck, now reconstituted, builds offshore drilling equipment and deep sea pile driving products. Today the company operates as MENCK GmbH.

== Monument ==
At the Place were the Factory was in Ottensen Altona, a 1954 M152 vandalised functional Excavator brings the Memory of what was there manufactured since 1998.
