= Humber Gateway Wind Farm =

Wind farm in the UK

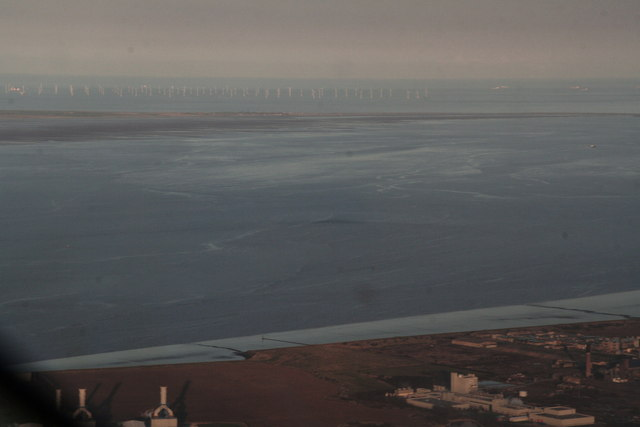
- Humber Gateway visible on the horizon, under construction in March 2015
- Country: United Kingdom
- Location: 8 km east of Spurn Point, East Riding of Yorkshire
- Coordinates: 53°38′38″N 0°17′35″E
- Status: Operational
- Commission date: June 2015
- Construction cost: £736 million
- Owners: Greencoat UK Wind; RWE AG
- Operator: RWE AG

Wind farm
- Type: Offshore
- Max. water depth: 15 m
- Distance from shore: 8 km (5 mi)
- Hub height: 80 m
- Rotor diameter: 112 m (367 ft)
- Site area: 35 km^{2} (14 sq mi)

Power generation
- Units operational: 73 × 3 MW
- Make and model: Vestas V112-3.0MW (73)
- Nameplate capacity: 219 MW
- Capacity factor: 41.9% (projected)
- Annual net output: 803 GW·h (planned)

External links
- Website: uk-ireland.rwe.com/locations/humber-gateway-offshore-wind-farm
- Commons: Related media on Commons

Wind farm layout

Humber Gateway Wind Farm is an offshore wind farm 8 kilometres (5 mi) east of Spurn Point off the coast of North East Lincolnshire, in the North Sea, England; the wind farm is located in water depths around 15 metres (49 ft) and covers an area of approximately 25 square kilometres (9.7 sq mi). The wind farm became operational in June 2015.

It was developed by Humber Wind Limited, a wholly owned subsidiary of E.ON UK plc.; the wind farm consists of seventy-three 3 MW wind turbines, with the electrical cable making landfall at Easington, and connecting to the National Grid, at Salt End, on the eastern outskirts of Kingston upon Hull.

In 2020, the ownership of Humber Gateway was transferred to RWE alongside E.ON's other renewables business.

== History ==
In 2003 EON submitted a bid to the Crown Estate to develop a wind farm in the 'Greater Wash Strategic Area'; (Note: The 'Greater Wash Strategic Environmental Assessment Area' was a region identified as a potential wind farm area in the UK Round 2 wind farm development, including areas in the sea off the east coast of England in Holderness, Lincolnshire, the Wash and north Norfolk.) a planning application was submitted in 2008 for a 300 MW, £700 million, wind farm. (Note: Planning application was undertaken by Humber Wind Limited, a wholly owned subsidiary of E ON UK plc.) Additional planning applications for onshore substation, and onshore underground cable were submitted in 2009/2008, and approved in 2010.

The site was located over 8 km east of Easington, in an area roughly 35 km^{2} (14 sq mi) with a water depth of around 15 m (49 ft), and approximately 15 km north-northeast from Donna Nook on the Lincolnshire coast. Cable connections were to make land fall at Easington and connect via about a 30 km underground cable connection with the National Grid near Salt End (near Hull). Initial plans were for a 300 MW wind farm, with 42–83 turbines. The wind farm had an expected operational life of 40 years based on the length of the Crown Estate lease, with possible turbine replacement after 20–25 years.

Governmental planning approval for a 230 MW (77 turbine) wind farm was given in early 2011. In December 2011 E ON published plans for a 73 turbine, 219 MW wind farm, using Vestas V112 3.0 MW turbines, with an initial completion date scheduled for spring 2015.

=== Contracts, design and construction ===
In 2012 CG (Avantha) was awarded the main contract for the design to installation of both onshore and offshore substations for the project. In early 2013 contract for the supply of turbine monopile foundations were split between TAG Energy Solutions (UK) (16 foundations), with the remainder supplied by Sif (Netherlands). ABB Group was contracted to supply 132kV submarine export cables in March 2012, the inter turbine cabling supply contract was awarded to General Cable subsidiary Norddeutsche Seekabelwerke Gmbh. in August 2012.

Harland and Wolff was contracted to design and supply the about 1300t substation foundation structure and piles in March 2013.

The first turbine foundation was installed in September 2013. In December 2013 two 600t offshore substations were delivered to the Port of Sunderland for installation at the wind farm.

By January 2014 the submarine export cables to the offshore transformer had been laid. The first turbine was installed mid 2014. Offshore substation installation was completed in late 2014. The wind farm first generated power in early 2015, with 58 of the turbines installed, and became fully operational by June 2015. The wind farm was formally opened by Andrea Leadsom (MP) 30 September 2015. Its levelised cost has been estimated at £147/MWh.

In September 2015 Balfour Beatty Equitix Consortium (Balfour Beatty/Equitix) became preferred bidder to own and operate the £162.9 million electricity export cable. The European Investment Bank provides £82 million for the transmission.

=== Grimsby operations centre ===
53.57919°N 0.05798°W

In mid 2012 E ON submitted a planning application to build an operations and maintenance centre at the Port of Grimsby, for the maintenance of the Humber Gateway wind farm. Construction firm ISG was awarded a £3 million contract to construct the centre in March 2013, including 5,920 sq ft (550 m^{2}) and 4,047 sq ft (376.0 m^{2}) warehouse and storage buildings. Construction was completed by September 2013. The centre was formally opened by Eric Pickles on 1 August 2014.
