= Ffrith Beach =

Beach in Prestatyn, Denbighshire, Wales

Coordinates: 53.3354°N 3.4410°W

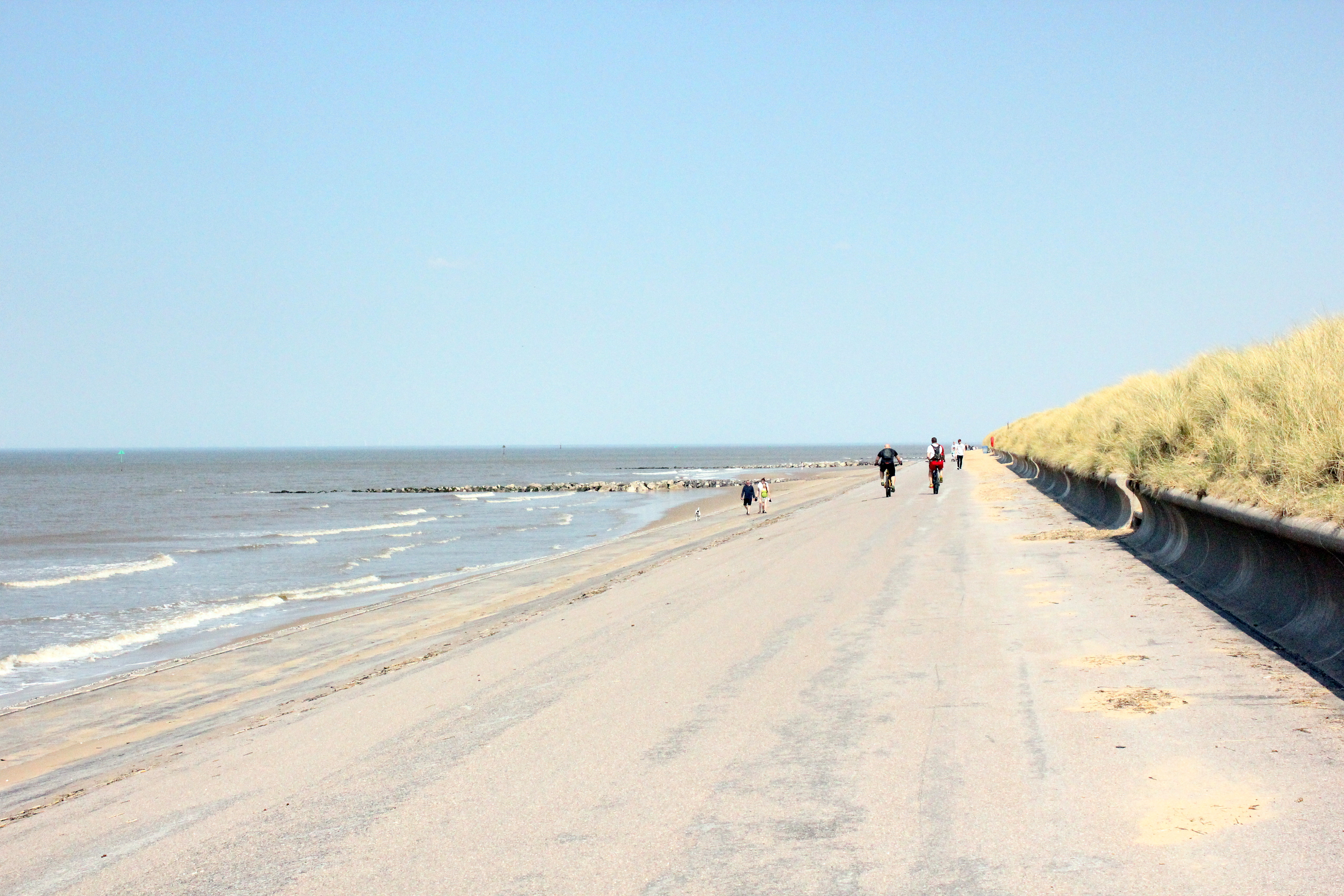
Ffrith Beach

Ffrith Beach, Prestatyn, Denbighshire, North Wales is one of three sandy beaches along the Prestatyn coastline - Barkby Beach, Central Beach and Ffrith Beach. A promenade joins the three beaches, and, at around 4-miles in length, is used by walkers and cyclists. It has been incorporated into the National Cycle Network. The views along the promenade extend from the Snowdonian Mountains, the Great Orme of Llandudno and Anglesey in the west, through to The Wirral to the east, and Prestatyn Hillside to the south. On very clear days, it is possible to see the Isle of Man, the Cumbrian Mountains and Blackpool Tower, while the BHP Petroleum Douglas oil and gas platform in Liverpool Bay is usually visible.

== History ==
Prestatyn Urban Council accepted a tender for a festival garden area containing "a model yacht pond, café, tea gardens and bathing chalets" in 1935. During the 1990s it became derelict following plans by Rhuddlan Borough Council to regenerate the site. These plans never materialised due to local government reorganisation, and in 2006 Denbighshire County Council announced that it was:

... to start working with a company to regenerate Prestatyn's Ffrith Beach. The Asset Management Committee yesterday (Tuesday) saw presentations from two companies bidding to develop the site. A preferred bidder was chosen, but for commercial reasons cannot yet be named. Cllr Julian Thompson-Hill, Committee Chairman, said: 'Denbighshire is committed to ensuring that the Ffrith is restored as a site which is an attraction to local people and the county as a whole. This is a major step forward and we are looking forward to working with the preferred bidder to make the most of this important asset.' Denbighshire officers will now work with the preferred bidder over the coming months to develop their initial proposals.

However, whilst negotiations were underway, arsonists set fire to the derelict complex on 1 March 2007.

== Ffrith Beach Fun Parc ==
In September 2007, the Ffrith Beach Fun Parc was being developed on Ffrith Beach with the dunes and its wildlife managed by Denbighshire County Council in conjunction with the developers Ffrith Leisure Ltd. The first new unit to open on Ffrith Beach was La Freccia Ristorante.

The development included a funfair with some of the rides from the closed-down Ocean Beach funfair at Rhyl being transferred to the site, but by early 2009, Ffrith Leisure had gone bankrupt. The local council began running the site as a proceeding concern with a view to finding another company to take on the site for further regeneration - which as of 2025 has yet to materialise.

Most of the funfair rides were removed and some transferred to the rear of the buildings.
