= Skyborn Renewables =

Company in offshore wind energy sector

Skyborn Renewables GmbH
- Industry: Offshore Wind Energy
- Founded: 2000 (later rebranded)
- Headquarters: Hamburg, Germany
- Parent: Global Infrastructure Partners
- Website: https://www.skybornrenewables.com/

Skyborn Renewables is a global offshore wind power developer, operator and owner. Headquartered in Hamburg, Germany, the company has over 20 years of experience in the offshore wind industry and is a portfolio company of Global Infrastructure Partners.

Skyborn operates with a global pipeline of over 20 GW in various stages of development across Europe, the Asia-Pacific region (APAC) and the Americas. Its recent achievements include the inauguration of the Yunlin project in Taiwan (March 2025), one of the country's largest offshore wind farms, and the development of Gennaker, its new blueprint project, which is expected to be the largest offshore wind farm in the German Baltic Sea. Offshore construction works are planned to commence in 2027.

== Key Projects ==
Skyborn has been involved in numerous offshore wind projects across its operational countries. Notable projects include:

=== Operational ===
- Nordergründe, Germany - 111 MW
- Butendiek, Germany (sold) - 288 MW
- Baltic 1, Germany (sold) - 50 MW
- Baltic 2, Germany (sold) - 288 MW
- Hohe See, Germany (sold) - 522 MW
- Fécamp, France - 500 MW
- South Fork, United States of America - 132 MW (Skyborn acquired 50% stake after inauguration)
- Yunlin, Taiwan - 640 MW

=== Under Construction ===
- Calvados, France - 450 MW
- Revolution, United States of America - 704 MW (Skyborn holds a 50% stake)

=== In Development ===
- Gennaker, Germany - 976.5 MW
- Storgrundet, Sweden - 1020 MW
- Polargrund, Sweden - 3000 MW
- Eystrasalt, Sweden - 3900 MW
- Fyrskeppet, Sweden - 2800 MW
- SouthH2Port, Sweden - 600 MW (Hydrogen Project)
- Pooki, Finland - 1500 MW
- Reimari, Finland - 2250 MW
