= JDR Cable Systems =

British subsea cable manufacturer

JDR Cable Systems Ltd.
- Trade name: JDR
- Headquarters: Littleport, Cambridgeshire, England
- Key people: Tomasz Nowak
- Parent: Tele-Fonika Kable (TFKable Group)
- Website: www.jdrcables.com

JDR is a provider of subsea technologies and services that provide control and power delivery for both the oil and gas and renewable energy sectors of the global offshore energy industry.

== History ==
In 1971 Peter Jacques and G.H. Chaplin formed Jacques Chaplin Engineering based in Hertfordshire manufacturing industrial hoses. In 1981 the company relocated to Littleport, Cambridgeshire under the name GH Chapling (Eng). In 1983 the company was acquired by Rotork, and renamed Jacques Rotork. In 1988 a management consortium bought the company and the business became known as Jacques Cable Systems.

In c.1991 Bromsgrove Industries acquired Jacques Cable and in 1994 acquired De Regt Special Cables - the two businesses were merged under Bromsgrove and renamed Jacques De Regt Cable Systems, later JDR Cable Systems. In 1988 overall ownership was acquired by NatWest Equity Partners. In 2007 the business was acquired jointly by Vision Capital, Goldman Sachs and management.

After the 2007 acquisition the company established a factory at the Port of Hartlepool at a cost of c. £30 million, enabling easy transhipment of undersea cables direct to ship.

In 2011 the company's Dutch subsidiaries, its marine cable division, JDR Cable Systems Holdings Netherlands BV, and JDR Cable Systems BV (nr. Rotterdame) were sold to Fugro NV, and renamed De Regt Marine Cables.

By 2015 the Hartlepool facility had expanded to include 280,000 square feet (26,000 m^{2}) of warehousing and employed 180 persons, driven by orders from the offshore oil and gas and wind industries. In early 2016 the business began constructing an additional 80,000 square feet (7,400 m^{2}) factory at Hartlepool. In 2017 it was taken over by Polish company Tele-Fonika Kable.

In 2021, the firm announced that it would open a new factory near Blyth with both private and state funding.
