= Bladt Industries =

International steel contractor

Bladt Industries A/S
- Website type: Joint-stock company
- Founded: 1965; 61 years ago (as Jørgen Bladt A/S)
- Headquarters: Aalborg
- Founder: Jørgen Bladt
- Key people: Anders Søe-Jensen CEO, COO Peter Rindebæk
- Industry: Offshore wind, oil & gas, infrastructure
- Revenue: ▲$450m (2013) $109m (2010)
- Net income: $116m (2010)
- Employees: 800 (2016) 700 (2014) 293 (2010)
- Parent: CS Wind (2023–present)
- Subsidiaries: Bladt Industries Offshore Wind Germany GmbH (100%) and Bladt Industries Polska Sp. zo.o (70%)
- Website: Bladt Industries website

Bladt Industries A/S is an international steel contractor specialising in large-scale and highly complex steel structures. It operate within three key areas of business providing steel solutions for the wind and renewable energy sector, for the oil and gas industry and for infrastructure.

Established in 1965 as Jørgen Bladt A/S, the company has contributed to several of the world's largest wind farms and oil and gas projects. Their range of products includes foundations and substations for offshore wind turbine projects, suctions anchors, topsides and jackets for oil and gas projects, as well as buildings, bridges and harbour structures for infrastructural projects.

In December 2023, it was announced that CS Wind completed the purchase of Bladt.

== Reference list ==
Bladt Industries A/S has contributed/is contributing to several large projects e.g.:

- Offshore substations for
  - Anholt Offshore Wind Farm
  - Gunfleet Sands Offshore Wind Farm
  - Hornsea Wind Farm (expected to become the world's largest wind farm upon its completion)
  - Lillgrund Offshore Wind Farm
  - Nysted Wind Farm(Denmark's first offshore substation)
  - Nordsee One Offshore Wind Farm
  - Nordsee-Ost Offshore Wind Farm
  - Northwind Offshore Wind Farm
  - Robin Rigg Offshore Wind Farm
  - Rødsand B
  - Princess Amalia Wind Farm
  - Sandbank Offshore Wind Farm
  - Walney Wind Farm
- Offshore foundations
  - Anholt Offshore Wind Farm
  - Baltic 1 Offshore Wind Farm
  - Beatrice Wind Farm
  - Belwind Offshore Wind Farm
  - Egmond aan Zee
  - Gode Wind Farm
  - Gwynt y Môr
  - Horns Rev 2
  - London Array)
  - Samsø Offshore Wind Farm
  - Veja Mate Offshore Wind Farm
  - Walney Wind Farm
