= Acteon Group (company) =

Subsea services company in Norwich, England

- Type: Private limited (Non-trading)
- Industry: Subsea Services
- Founded: Norwich (2004)
- Headquarters: Norwich, England, United Kingdom
- Area served: Global
- Key people: Brice Bouffard, Group Chief Executive
- Revenue: £310,860,000
- Number of employees: 1538
- Website: acteon.com

Acteon is a specialist subsea services company. Acteon Group Operations (UK) Limited is registered in England, with its headquarters in Norwich.

Acteon Group is one of the largest firms in East Anglia, consisting of three business lines that provide integrated subsea services, mainly to the oil, gas and renewables industries, with particular focus on foundations and moorings; risers, conductors and flowlines; Marine electronics, instrumentation and surveys; and activity management and manpower provision. Acteon provides seabed-to-surface equipment, technologies and services and is represented at every stage in the life of an oilfield.

== History ==
Acteon was formed in 2004 from the UWG Group which at that time comprised five individual companies: UWG, Claxton, MENCK, 2H and TEAM. Since then, Acteon has expanded with the acquisition of companies that offer complementary services in the subsea services arena.

The main acquisitions are:

- In 2004, Acteon acquired the business and assets of Technip Offshore Moorings, Inc. to create a new company called Intermoor Inc.
- In 2006, Acteon acquired Trident Offshore Inc. and Aquatic Engineering and Construction Ltd.
- In 2007, Acteon completed the acquisition of three companies from the Craig Group: Seatronics Ltd, International Mooring Systems Ltd (IMS) and Chain Corporation International Ltd (ChainCo). The same year saw the merger of TEAM Energy Resources Ltd with the manpower services arm of Aquatic.
- In 2008, Acteon acquired the Singapore-based CAPE Group and 80% of Brazilian mooring and anchoring equipment specialist Fluke Engenharia Ltda.
- In June 2011, Acteon acquired the offshore survey and positioning specialist NCS Survey Ltd.

In 2010, despite a global drop in activity levels after the Deepwater Horizon oil spill, the Acteon Group posted accounts showing an 8% increase in revenue and a growth in profit from £32.13million to £36.24million. and achieving notable technical successes.

Acteon companies operate from the world's major offshore oil and gas centres and are involved in projects in many exploration and production areas.

Acteon's companies have included 2H Offshore, Aquatic, CAPE, CIS, Claxton, Deepwater Corrosion Services, Fluke, InterAct, Intermoor, LDD, MENCK, Mirage, OIS, Pulse Structural Monitoring, Seatronics, SRP, TEAM and UTEC.

In 2012, the Acteon Group announced a change of ownership. The group's majority interest was acquired by the management team of Kohlberg Kravis Roberts.

In 2024, the Acteon Group announced a change of ownership. The Group was acquired by Buckthorne and One Equity partners (OEP).

Business lines:

- Intermoor, Acteon's Moorings and Anchors business line
- UTEC, Acteon's Geo-services business line
- 2H, Acteon's Engineering Consultancy

== See also ==
- List of oilfield service companies
