= Ørsted (company) =

Danish energy company

Ørsted A/S
- Type: State-owned; Aktieselskab
- Traded as: Nasdaq Copenhagen: ORSTED
- ISIN: DK0060094928
- Industry: Electricity generation
- Predecessor: Dansk Naturgas A/S; Elsam; Energi E2; NESA; Københavns Energi; Frederiksberg Forsyning
- Founded: 14 March 2006; 20 years ago (as DONG Energy)
- Headquarters: Fredericia, Denmark
- Key people: Rasmus Errboe (CEO); Lene Skole(Chairman)
- Products: Electricity
- Revenue: 73.24 billion kr. (2025)
- Operating income: 8.62 billion kr. (2025)
- Net income: 3.17 billion kr. (2025)
- Total assets: 367.92 billion kr. (2025)
- Total equity: 148.94 billion kr. (2025)
- Number of employees: FTE 7,896 (2025)
- Website: orsted.com

Ørsted A/S (formerly DONG Energy) is a majority state-owned Danish multinational energy company. Headquartered in Fredericia, Denmark, Ørsted is the largest energy company in Denmark. The company adopted its current name on 6 November 2017. It was previously known as DONG Energy.

As of January 2022, the company is the world's largest developer of offshore wind power by number of built offshore wind farms. Ørsted developed approximately 30% of the global offshore wind power installed capacity, excluding mainland China. Globally, Ørsted produces 90% of its energy from renewable sources, and has an objective of exceeding 95% by 2023 and 99% by 2025. The company has a goal of net zero generation by 2025 and no carbon emissions by 2040.

In 2025, Ørsted A/S broke into the top 10 in the Corporate Knights Global 100, coming in ninth in the annual ranking of the world's most sustainable corporations. The company had a net revenue of DKK 73.4 billion and net profit amounted to DKK 3.2 billion for the 2025 fiscal year.

== History ==
=== Origin ===
Ørsted has its origin in the Danish state-owned company Dansk Naturgas A/S. The company was founded in 1972 to manage gas and oil resources in the Danish sector of the North Sea. After some years, the company was renamed to Dansk Olie og Naturgas A/S (DONG), meaning Danish Oil and Natural Gas. At the beginning of the decade of the 2000s, DONG started to expand itself into the electricity market by taking long positions in electricity companies. In 2005, DONG acquired and merged Danish electrical power producers Elsam and Energi E2 and public utility (electricity distribution) companies NESA, Københavns Energi and Frederiksberg Forsyning. The result of the merger was the creation of DONG Energy. The merger was approved by the European Commission on 14 March 2006. In 2002 Elsam had installed the 160 MW Horns Rev offshore wind farm, which was the first large-scale offshore wind farm in the world.

In 2005, DONG Energy acquired 10.34% in the Ormen Lange gas field (operated by Shell). The share of gas reserves allocated to DONG Energy are approximately 40 billion cubic metres (1.4 trillion cubic feet). The following year, DONG entered a 20-year contract for one billion cubic meters of natural gas per year from 2011, from Gazprom in Russia through Nord Stream 1 and Germany. The deal included that DONG delivers 600 million cubic meters per year (for 15 years) from the Ormen Lange gas field to Gazprom in United Kingdom.

In 2007, DONG and Wingas (partly owned by Gazprom) agreed to a gas swap, where DONG delivers gas to Wingas UK, while Wingas delivers the same amount to DONG in North Germany. The deal was criticized as "damaging to European interests".

=== Use of fossil fuels ===
At about the time of the 2009 United Nations Climate Change Conference in Copenhagen, DONG Energy adopted the "85/15 vision" strategy, with the aim of changing from a company with 85% of activities fossil fuel based to a company 85% based on green energy activities.

In 2009, the Gazprom->DONG contract was doubled to 2 bcm/year for 18 years, beginning in 2012. However, Gazprom records showed that DONG only bought 15% of that amount in 2012 and 2013.

In 2009, DONG Energy sold its fiber broadband in northern Zealand to TDC A/S.

In 2010, the company started a cooperation with Dutch Nederlandse Energie Maatschappij. However, in 2014 DONG Energy withdrew its consumer activities from the Dutch market. In 2010, DONG divested Norwegian power companies Salten and Nordkraft.

In September 2013, DONG Energy sold a power cable accessing the London Array wind farm to its partners, E.ON and Masdar for around $728 million.

=== Focus on offshore wind power ===
By 2012, DONG Energy had a wind turbine capacity of 794 MW and planned to add another 594 MW the following year. In 2013, the company finished the construction of the 400 MW Anholt Offshore Wind Farm off the Danish island of Anholt in the Kattegat at a cost of 10 billion Danish kroner (€1.35 bln). DONG Energy was the only bidder in the process. The following year, DONG Energy divested its last onshore wind turbines, focusing on offshore wind power. of which DONG Energy had 3,000 MW in 2015;

As part of the restructuring plan to fund offshore wind projects, in January 2014 the company sold an 18% stake to New Energy Investment S.a.r.l., a subsidiary of Goldman Sachs, while Danish pension funds, ATP and PFA Pension acquired 4.9% and 1.8% accordingly. The deal was heavily criticised and caused a split of the ruling coalition of Helle Thorning-Schmidt. Six cabinet ministers and the Socialist People's Party withdrew from the government. On 9 June 2016, some of these shares were sold in an IPO at Copenhagen Stock Exchange. In 2015, DONG Energy had a deficit of 12 billion DKK, the largest of any Danish company ever.

DONG Energy was listed on the Copenhagen Stock Exchange in June 2016. At the same time, it divested its ownership shares of five Norwegian oil and gas fields to Faroe Petroleum. That year, the company was voted number 11 on the Clean200 list.

In 2017, DONG Energy completed decommissioning of the world's first offshore wind farm, Vindeby Offshore Wind Farm.

=== Name change ===
In 2017, the company decided to phase-out the use of coal for power generation, and it sold off its oil and gas business to Ineos for US$1.05 billion. After selling its oil and gas business the company announced its transition to renewable energy was fulfilled and changed its name to Ørsted after the Danish scientist Hans Christian Ørsted, citing that DONG was inappropriate considering they no longer owned any oil and natural gas assets.

In 2018 Ørsted acquired Deepwater Wind to expand offshore wind in the US.

In 2018, a gas price arbitration case was closed between Gazprom on one side, and Ørsted, Shell and others on the opposite side.

In 2019, Ørsted divested the Copenhagen electricity distribution network to Andel for $3 billion.

On 9 September 2020 it was revealed that Mads Nipper, former CEO of Grundfos, will take over as CEO from Henrik Poulsen on 1 January 2021.

In 2020 developer Ørsted sold a 50% stake in the Greater Changhua 1 Offshore Wind Farm in Taiwan to Caisse de depot et placement du Quebec and Cathay PE for $2.7 billion.

In 2022, Ørsted began rewilding the seabottom near some of its offshore wind farms.

== Operations ==
Ørsted considers Denmark, Sweden, the United Kingdom, Germany and the Netherlands as core markets of corporation. However, in 2015 they also received a lease from the US agencies the Department of the Interior and the Bureau of Ocean Energy Management, which, in the lease, handed over some sea area in the United States for wind park development, specifically in New Jersey.

=== Oil and gas exploration and production ===
Before the divestment of its oil and gas upstream assets to Ineos in 2017, DONG Energy's core areas of oil and gas exploration and production lay in the southern part of the Norwegian North Sea and the Danish part of the North Sea, Barents Sea, west of Shetland, and in the central region of Norway (gas production). The reserve base was expected to be 570 million barrels (91,000,000 m^{3}) of oil equivalent. In 2016, it produced 100,000 barrels per day (16,000 m^{3}/d) of oil equivalent.

In 2016, DONG Energy agreed to sell its oil and gas pipelines to Energinet.dk. It owned oil and gas pipelines which extend from the Danish part of the North Sea to Nybro and the Swedish gas transmission network (Nova Naturgas). DONG Energy co-owned the Tyra West – F3 pipeline pipelines, which create a link from the North Sea Danish section to the Netherlands natural gas hub in Den Helder, the DEUDAN pipeline from Jutland to north of Hamburg in Germany, and the Langeled pipeline from Nyhamna terminal in Norway to Easington in the UK.

=== Power production ===
Ørsted is the largest power producer in Denmark with market shares of 49% for electricity production and 35% for heat production. It also owns power production facilities and projects in Germany, Sweden, the Netherlands, Norway and the United Kingdom.

Ørsted is the largest offshore wind farm company in the world with a market share of 16%. Ørsted surpassed 1,000 offshore wind turbines in 2016. In Denmark, it operates the 209 MW Horns Rev 2 offshore wind farm. In the United Kingdom Ørsted operates Barrow and Burbo Bank offshore windfarms and will construct Walney and Gunfleet Sands I and II wind farms. In addition, it is building the world largest wind farms, the 1,200 MW Hornsea 1 and the 1,386 MW Hornsea 2.

In North America it is a joint venture partner in multiple proposed offshore wind projects, including the Block Island Wind Farm, Revolution Wind, South Fork Wind, and Sunrise Wind, all off the southern coast of New England. In August 2025, the Revolution Wind project received an offshore stop-work order from US Department of the Interior’s Bureau of Ocean Energy Management.

The company was also developing Ocean Wind, an offshore wind farm on the Atlantic coast near Atlantic City, New Jersey, until it was cancelled in October 2023, and Skipjack Wind, southeast of the mouth of Delaware Bay. The company also has interests in onshore wind farms in Texas, Kansas, Nebraska, and Illinois.

Ørsted was until 2017 the largest shareholder (51%) of offshore wind turbine installer A2SEA, while Siemens owns the other 49%. Ørsted also has 30% of subsea cabling installer CT Offshore.

Ørsted has been developing Borssele 1 and 2 wind farms in the Netherlands since 2021.

In 2025, the Greater Changhua 2b and 4 wind projects as well as Borkum Riffgfrund 3 reached first power, and Godwin 3 was commissioned.

On 26 November 2024, a joint venture between Ørsted and the Irish ESB Group was awarded the rights to develop a 900 MW offshore windfarm at the Tonn Nua site off the coast of County Waterford in Ireland.

In February 2026, Ørsted sold its entire European non-offshore renewable energy business to Copenhagen Infrastructure Partners (CIP) for €1.44 billion. This came after Ørsted sold 50% of Hornsea 3 and 55% of Changua 2.

== Shareholders ==
Ørsted is listed at the Nasdaq Copenhagen stock exchange. The Danish Government holds the majority of Ørsted shares (50.1%). Capital Group Companies, EuroPacific Growth Fund's, and SEAS-NVE holds over 5% of shares. According to a political agreement, the Danish Government shall maintain a majority in the company until 2025.

== See also ==
- Energy in Denmark
- List of companies of Denmark
- List of renewable energy companies by country
