= EEW Group =

German steel pip manufacturing company

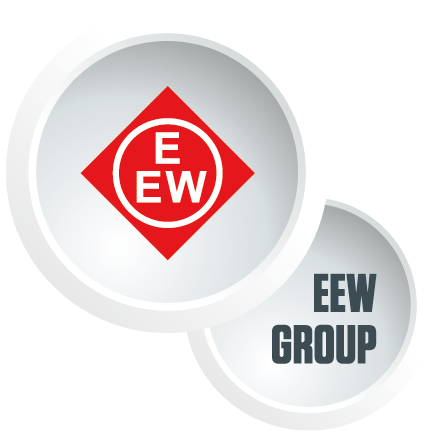
- Native name: Erndtebrücker Eisenwerk GmbH & Co. KG
- Company type: Privately held company GmbH & Co. KG
- Industry: Manufacturing
- Founded: 1936; 90 years ago
- Headquarters: Erndtebrück, Germany
- Area served: Worldwide
- Key people: Christoph Schorge
- Number of employees: 1,514 (2021)
- Website: eew-group.com

EEW Group is a German family-run manufacturing company that specializing in the manufacture of longitudinally welded steel pipes and prefabricated pipe components. Its headquarters are in Erndtebrück . The company manufactures pipes for the oil and gas industry and structures for wind turbines.

The company operates six production sites, two in Germany, two in Korea, and one each in Malaysia and the United States.

== History ==
The roots of the Erndtebrücker Eisenwerk lie in the forging company Erndtebrücker Eisen- und Blechwaren GmbH, founded in 1936. When demand for steel pipes in the oil and gas industry increased significantly in the mid-1970s, the company switched its production program from metal containers to longitudinally welded pipes.

In 2001, the company established its first foreign production site with the construction of a plant in South Korea. In 2009, a second foreign production site, EEW Malaysia, was founded.

In 2024, Sumitomo made an equity stake in EEW as part of its focus on offshore wind power infrastructure.
