= List of offshore wind farms in the United Kingdom =

Offshore Windfarm capacity in GW
- Operational
- Under Construction
- Pre-Construction
- Planning
- Early Planning

This is a list of offshore wind farms within the national maritime boundaries of the United Kingdom.

In July 2026 the nameplate capacity of offshore wind farms in operation was approximately 16.6 GW, with a further 10.4 GW under construction and 5.4 GW in pre-construction. Contracts for difference for a further 5.7 GW have been awarded by the UK Government. A further 36.8 GW are in early planning stages.

If all proposed wind farms are developed, by the 2030s, the United Kingdom's nameplate capacity is expected to reach approximately 76 GW.

A total of 5.9 GW of proposed OWFs has been cancelled.

== Operational offshore wind farms ==
In July 2025, there were offshore wind farms consisting of 2,809 turbines with a combined capacity of 16,035 megawatts. Strike price is the fixed rate offered under the Contracts for Difference subsidy scheme, based on £/MWh at 2012 prices. Older projects were under the Renewables Obligation schemes, and did not get a set price.

Name	Country	Location	Capacity (MW)	No.	Turbine manufacturer(s)	Turbine model(s)	Project commissioning year	Strike price	Build cost	Capacity factor	Depth range (m)	km to shore	Owner	Refs.
Barrow	England	53°59′00″N 3°17′00″W	90	30	Vestas	V90-3.0 MW	July 2006		£123m	35.9%	15–20	7	Ørsted	(Note: Barrow Offshore Wind Farm)
Beatrice	Scotland	58°06′20″N 03°05′35″W	10	2	REpower	5M	July 2007		£35m	20%	45	23	SSE, Talisman Energy	
Beatrice extension	Scotland	58°06′20″N 03°05′35″W	588	84	Siemens Gamesa	SWT-7.0-154	July 2019	140	£2,600m		45	23	SSE Talisman Energy	
Blyth Offshore Demonstrator	England		41.5	5	Vestas	V164-8 MW	2017				50-60	6.5	EDF Renewables	
Burbo Bank	England	53°29′00″N 3°11′00″W	90	25	Siemens	SWT-3.6-107	September 2007		£90m	32–35%	0–6	7	Ørsted	(Note: Burbo Bank)
Burbo Bank Extension	England	53°29′00″N 3°11′00″W	258	32	Vestas	V164 8.0 MW	April 2017				6–13		Ørsted	
Dudgeon	England	53°15′00″N 1°23′00″E	402	67	Siemens	SWT-6.0–154	October 2017		£1,500m	48%			Equinor, Statkraft	
East Anglia One	England	52°14′04″N 02°29′18″E	714	102	Siemens	SWT-7.0-154	2020	119.89				43		
European Offshore Wind Deployment Centre	Scotland	57°13′0″N 1°59′0″W	93	11	Vestas	Vestas V164 8 MW	September 2018				32	3	European Offshore Wind Deployment Centre	
Galloper	England		353	56	Siemens	SWT-6.0-154	March 2018				27-36	27	RWE	
Greater Gabbard	England	51°56′0″N 1°53′0″E	504	140	Siemens	SWT-3.6-107	September 2012		£1,500m	42.2%	20–32	23	SSE Renewables	
Gunfleet Sands 1 & 2	England	51°43′0″N 01°12′50″E	172	48	Siemens	SWT-3.6-107	April 2010		£300m	36.6%	2–15	7	Ørsted	(Note: Gunfleet Sands)
Gunfleet Sands 3 – Demonstration Project	England	51°43′0″N 01°12′50″E	12	2	Siemens	SWT-6.0-120	April 2013		£51m	31.1%	5–12	8	Ørsted	(Note: Gunfleet Sands demonstration project)
Gwynt y Môr	Wales	53°27′00″N 03°35′00″W	576	160	Siemens	SWT-3.6-107	June 2015		>£2,000m	31.7%	20	17	RWE Npower, Stadtwerke München, GIB, Siemens	(Note: Gwynt y Môr)
Hornsea One	England	53°53′06″N 01°47′28″E	1218	174	Siemens	SWT-7.0-154	2020	140					Ørsted, Global Infrastructure Partners	
Hornsea Two	England	53°53′06″N 01°47′28″E	1386	165	Siemens	SG 8.0-167 DD	August 2022	57.50			25-30	120	Ørsted, Global Infrastructure Partners	
Humber Gateway	England	53°38′38″N 0°17′35″E	219	73	Vestas	V112 3.0 MW	June 2015		£736m	41.1%	15	10	E.ON	(Note: Humber Gateway)
Hywind Scotland	Scotland	57°29′0″N 1°21′0″W	30	5	Siemens	SWT-6.0-154	October 2017		NOK2 billion (£152m)	54%	95–120	25	Equinor, Masdar	
Kentish Flats	England	51°27′36″N 01°05′24″E	140	30	Vestas	V90-3.0 MW and V112-3.3MW	October 2005		£121.5m	31.3%, 42.9%	3–5	10	Vattenfall	(Note: Kentish Flats)
Kincardine	Scotland	57°0′22″N 1°51′8″W	49.5	6	Vestas	V164-9.5 MW and V80-2 MW	October 2021				60–80	15	Principle Power, Flotation Energy, Cobra Wind	
Lincs	England	53°11′0″N 0°29′0″E	270	75	Siemens	SWT-3.6-120	September 2013		£1,000m	42%	10–15	8	Centrica, Siemens, Ørsted	(Note: Lincs)
London Array	England	51°38′38″N 1°33′13″E	630	175	Siemens	SWT-3.6-107	April 2013		£1,800m	41.1%	0–25	20	Ørsted, E.ON UK Renewables, Masdar	(Note: London Array)
Lynn and Inner Dowsing	England	53°07′39″N 0°26′10″E	194	54	Siemens	SWP-3.6-107	March 2009		£300m	34.9%	6–11	5	Centrica 50% TCW 50%	(Note: Lynn and Inner Dowsing)
Methil	Scotland	56°09′46″N 03°00′32″W	7	1	Samsung	7 MW	October 2013				5	0.05	Samsung, 2-B Energy	(Note: Energy Park Fife (Methil))
Moray East	Scotland	58.1°N 2.8°W	950	100	Vestas	V164-9.5 MW	April 2022	57.50			25–30	120	Ocean Winds	
Moray West	Scotland	58.1°N 3.1°W	882	60	Siemens	Gamesa SG 14-222 DD	April 2025	37.35 & 54.23	£2,500m		35–54	22.5	Ocean Wind	
Neart Na Gaoithe	Scotland	56°16′4″N 2°19′15″W	450	54	Siemens	Gamesa SG 8.0-167 DD	July 2025	114.39				20	EDF R / ESB	
North Hoyle	Wales	53°26′00″N 3°24′00″W	60	30	Vestas	V80-2 MW	December 2003		£80m	31.5%	5–12	7	Greencoat UK Wind	(Note: North Hoyle)
Ormonde	England	54°06′00″N 3°24′00″W	150	30	REpower	5 MW	August 2012		£552m	39.5%	17–22	9.5	Vattenfall	(Note: Ormonde, Irish Sea)
Race Bank	England	53°16′30″N 0°50′30″E	573	91	Siemens	SWT-6.0-154	February 2018						Ørsted	
Rampion	England	50°40′00″N 0°16′00″W	400	116	Vestas	V112-3.45 MW	April 2018		£1,300m			13	E.ON	
Rhyl Flats	Wales	53°22′00″N 3°39′00″W	90	25	Siemens	SWT-3.6-107	December 2009		£198m	32.9%	4–15	8	Npower (UK) (RWE)	(Note: Rhyl Flats)
Robin Rigg	Scotland	54°45′00″N 3°43′00″W	180	60	Vestas	V90-3.0 MW	April 2010		£396m	35.1%	0–12	11	E.ON	(Note: Robin Rigg)
Scroby Sands	England	52°38′0″N 1°47′0″E	60	30	Vestas	V80-2 MW	March 2004		£75.5m	30.7%	0–8	2.5	E.ON	(Note: Scroby Sands)
Seagreen Phase 1	Scotland	56°35.094′N 01°45.537′W	1400	114	Vestas	V164-10.0 MW	October 2023	41.61	£3,000m		Up to 59		SSE Renewables, TotalEnergies	
Sheringham Shoal	England	53°07′0″N 1°08′0″E	317	88	Siemens	SWT-3.6-107	September 2012		£1,100m	40.7%	12–24	17	Equinor 50% Statkraft 50%	(Note: Statkraft – Sheringham Shoal)
Teesside	England	54°38′50″N 1°05′40″W	62	27	Siemens	SWT-2.3-93	August 2013		£200m	34.8%	7–15	1.5	EDF-EN	
Thanet	England	51°26′0″N 1°38′0″E	300	100	Vestas	V90-3.0 MW	September 2010		£900m	32.8%	20–25	11	Vattenfall	(Note: Thanet)
Triton Knoll	England	53°30′00″N 0°48′0″E	857	90	Vestas	v164-9.5 MW	March 2022	74.75				33	RWE	
Walney	England	54°03′00″N 3°31′00″W	367	102	Siemens	SWT-3.6-107	February 2010		£630m	40.5%, 43.8%	19–30	14	Ørsted, SSE, OPW	(Note: Walney Offshore Windfarm)
Walney Extension	England	54°5′17″N 3°44′17″W	659	87	Siemens Vestas	SWT-7.0-154 MHI V164-8.25	September 2018	150.00					Ørsted	
Westermost Rough	England	53°48′18″N 0°8′56″E	210	35	Siemens	SWT-6.0-154	May 2015		£370m	42.9%	15	10	Ørsted, Marubeni, GIB	(Note: Westermost Rough)
West of Duddon Sands	England	53°59′00″N 3°28′00″W	389	108	Siemens	SWT-3.6-120	October 2014		£1,600m	44.2%	17–24	15	Ørsted, Scottish Power	(Note: West of Duddon Sands)

Notes
Abbreviation	Explanation
Cap.	The rated nameplate capacity of the wind farm.
No.	The number of wind turbines.
Model	The model of wind turbine.
Cost	The total capital cost of the project up to commissioning.
Cap. fac.	The average capacity factor, i.e. the average power generated by the wind farm, as a percentage of its nameplate capacity.
Km to shore	The average distance of the wind farm to shore, or (where available) the distance from the in-farm transformer/substation to the shore.
Depth range (m)	The range of minimum to maximum depths of water in which the wind farm is sited.
Refs	The source references for the information. The [w ...] footnotes link to each wind farm's own home page.

=== Map of the UK offshore wind farms ===
Offshore wind farm locations in UK waters

== Wind farms under construction ==
These are offshore wind farms currently under construction (offshore), with a combined capacity in February 2026 of 10,392 MW. Strike price is based on £/MWh at 2012 prices.

Name	Country	Location	Cap. (MW)	No.	Model	Project commissioning	Strike price	Depth range (m)	Km to shore	Owner	Refs.
Sofia Offshore Wind Farm	England	55.0°N 1.93°E	1400	100	Siemens Gamesa SG 14-222 DD	2026	39.65		195	RWE	
Dogger Bank A	England	54.77°N 1.917°E	1235	95	GE-Haliade X 13 MW	2026	39.65		131	SSE Renewables, Equinor	
Dogger Bank B	England	54.98462°N 1.65343°E	1235	95	GE-Haliade X 13 MW	2027	41.61			SSE Renewables, Equinor	
Dogger Bank C	England	55.02233°N 2.71059°E	1218	87	GE-Haliade X 14 MW	2027	41.61			SSE Renewables, Equinor	
East Anglia Three	England	TM097462	1372	95	Siemens Gamesa SG 14-236 DD	2026	37.35 (159 MW for AR6 @ 54.23)			Iberdrola	
Inch Cape	Scotland	NT394753	1080	72	Vestas V236-15	2027	37.35 (251 MW for AR6 @ 54.23)			Inch Cape Offshore	
Hornsea Three	England	TG210034	2852	197	Siemens Gamesa SG 14-236 DD	2028	37.35 (1080 MW for AR6 @ 54.23)		160	Ørsted	

== Pre-construction wind farms ==
These are wind farms that have started onshore construction and have been awarded contracts under the UK Government's Contracts for Difference Round 4 (2022), Round 6 (2024) for East Anglia and Round 7 (2026) for Vanguard. Total capacity of 5,433 MW. Strike price is based on £/MWh at 2012 prices for Norfolk Boreas and £/MWh at 2024 prices for Vanguard.

Name	Country	Location	Cap. (MW)	No.	Model	Project commissioning	Strike price	Depth range (m)	Km to shore	Owner	Refs.
Norfolk Boreas	England	53°00′00″N 2°56′00″E	1380		Vestas	2027	37.35		72	RWE	
East Anglia Two	England	52.188915°N 1.624642°E	963	64	Siemens Gamesa SG 14-236 DD	2028	58.87		33	Iberdrola	
Norfolk Vanguard West	England	52.931258°N 2.475668°E	1400	92	Vestas V236-15	2030	91.20	30-46	50	RWE	
Norfolk Vanguard East	England	52.888493°N 2.935289°E	1400	92	Vestas V236-15	2030	91.20	30-41		RWE	

== Proposed wind farms - Contracts for Difference Round 6 ==
These are wind farms proposed under the Round 6 (2024) CFD auction, with a combined capacity of 400 MW. Strike price is based on £/MWh at 2012 prices.

Name	Country	Location	Cap. (MW)	No.	Model	Project commissioning	Strike price	Depth range (m)	Km to shore	Owner	Notes	Refs.
Green Volt OWF	Scotland	NJ830445	400			2029	139.93			Green Volt		

Note: this table does not include OWFs that were awarded contracts in AR4, and have now received a new contract as a result of permitted reduction in AR6.

== Proposed wind farms - Contracts for Difference Round 7 ==
These are wind farms proposed under the Round 7 (2025/6) CFD auction, with a combined capacity of 5,347.5 MW. Strike price is based on £/MWh at 2024 prices.

Name	Country	Location	Cap. (MW)	No.	Model	Project commissioning	Strike price	Depth range (m)	Km to shore	Owner	Notes	Refs.
Awel y Môr	Wales	SJ015735	775			2030/31	91.20			Awel y Môr OWF Ltd		
Berwick Bank Phase B	Scotland	NT307745	1380			2030/31	89.49			Berwick Bank B Ltd	Only Phase B	
Dogger Bank SE	England	TA044349	1500			Construction 2027 Commissioning 2030/31	91.20			RWE Renewables UK	Planning permission received 14 May 2026	
Dogger Bank SW	England	TA044349	1500			Construction 2027 Commissioning 2030/31	91.20			RWE Renewables UK	Planning permission received 14 May 2026	
Erebus	Wales	SM935014	100			2029/30	216.49			Blue Gem Wind Ltd		
Pentland Floating OWF	Scotland	NC981666	92.5			2029/30	216.49			Highland Wind Ltd		

== Proposed wind farms - early planning ==
These are wind farms that are in an exploratory phase and have not yet secured a Contract for Difference at auction.

Total capacities: England: 10,060 MW - Scotland: 26,226 MW

Name	Country	Location	Cap. (MW)	No.	Model/ capacity	Technology	Project commissioning	Option price	Depth range (m)	Km to shore	Owner	Notes	Refs.
East Anglia One North	England		800	up to 67		Fixed				37.7	Iberdrola	Awaiting CFD	
Rampion 2 Extension	England	50°40′00″N 0°16′00″W	1200	90		Fixed	Construction 2027 Commissioning 2030				RWE, Macquarie, Enbridge	April 2025: granted development consent by Government.	
Five Estuaries	England	Adjacent to Galloper Wind Farm	1080	up to 79		Fixed	Construction 2027 Commissioning 2030				RWE	DCO granted - Dec 2025	
North Falls	England	Adjacent to Greater Gabbard wind farm	504 (up to 1000)	57		Fixed	Construction 2027 Commissioning 2030		5 - 58	40	SSE Renewables, RWE	DCO granted - May 2025	
Dogger Bank D	England		1320			Fixed					SSE Renewables, Equinor	Signed lease with Crown Estate - Jan 2023	
Berwick Bank	Scotland	Outer Firth of Forth	2720			Fixed					SSE Renewables	Does not include Phase B which as was awarded a CfD in AR 7	
Seagreen Phase 1A	Scotland		500			Fixed					SSE Renewables, TotalEnergies		
Outer Dowsing	England	Off the Lincolnshire Coast, East of the Humber Estuary	1500	100		Fixed	Construction 2027 Commissioning 2030	£125m		54	Corio Generation, TotalEnergies	Aug 2022 - scoping report sent to the Planning Inspectorate. Signed lease with Crown Estate - Jan 2023 DCO granted - Oct 2026	
Morecambe	England	Off the Lancashire Coast, West of Blackpool and South West of Morecambe Bay	480	20 - 40		Fixed	2030	£45m		30	Copenhagen Infrastructure Partners	Signed lease with Crown Estate - Jan 2023, DCO granted 1 December 2025	
Mona	England	Off the Northern Welsh Coast, North East of Anglesey	1500			Fixed	Construction 2027 Commissioning 2030	£231m	35	30	JERA Nex bp	Signed lease with Crown Estate - Jan 2023. EnBW sold stake - Jan 2026 DCO granted July 2025	
Morven	Scotland	"Map Reference 1"	2907			Fixed		£85.9m	65-75	60	BP Alternative Energy Investments	Nov 2022 - two floating LiDARs to be deployed	
Ossian	Scotland	"Map Reference 2"	2610	Up to 270		Floating		£85.9m			SSE Renewables	Potential to grow to 3.6 GW. Nov 2022 - completed a geophysical and benthic survey	
Bellrock	Scotland	"Map Reference 3"	1200			Floating		£28m			Falck Renewables	Feb 2023 - FLS200 floating LiDAR buoy to be deployed.	
Muir Mhòr	Scotland	"Map Reference 5"	798			Floating		£20m		67	Vattenfall	Jun '23 Geophysical and environmental surveys started	
Bowdun	Scotland	"Map Reference 6" - E3 leasing zone off Bowdun Head	1008	50 to 60	18-25 MW each	Fixed	Construction to commence 2029 and commissioned in 2033	£18.7m		44	Thistle Wind Partners	Mar '23 renamed, formerly Cluaran Deas Ear	
Ayre	Scotland	"Map Reference 7" NE2 leasing zone, off East Mainland of Orkney	1008			Floating	Construction to commence 2029 and commissioned in 2033	£20m		33	Thistle Wind Partners	Mar '23 renamed, formerly Cluaran Ear-Thuath	
Broadshore	Scotland	"Map Reference 8"	900			Floating		£25.6m			Falck Renewables	Feb 2023 - FLS200 floating LiDAR buoy to be deployed.	
Caledonia	Scotland	"Map Reference 9" - adjacent to Moray East and Moray West OWFs.	2000			Fixed	2030	£42.9m			Ocean Winds (joint venture between ENGIE & EDP Renewables)	May 2023 - LiDAR devices to be deployed. Geophysical surveys partially complete.	
Stromar	Scotland	"Map Reference 10"	1000			Floating		£13.4m			Falck Renewables		
MarramWind	Scotland	"Map Reference 11" - North East coast of Scotland	3000			Floating	2030	£68.4m	Averaging 100	75	ScottishPower	Shell sold its stake	
Buchan	Scotland	"Map Reference 12"	960			Floating		£33m			BayWa	A floating LiDAR Buoy has been deployed - Nov 2022 Onshore consent granted May 2026	
West of Orkney	Scotland	"Map Reference 13"	2000			Fixed		£65.7m			Offshore Wind Power	Oct 2022 - completed offshore and nearshore surveys	
Havbredey	Scotland	Northwest of Lewis	1500			Floating	2036	£3.9m		35	Northland Power		
"N3 Project"	Scotland	"Map Reference 15"	495	15		Mixed	2030	£10.3m	106-125		Magnora		
Spiorad na Mara	Scotland	"Map Reference 16" - West coast of Lewis	840			Fixed	2031	£16.1m		5	Northland Power	This project will be prioritized over the Havbredey project.	
MachairWind	Scotland	"Map Reference 17"	2000			Fixed		£75.4m			Scottish Power		
Sheringham Shoal and Dudgeon Extensions	England	Adjacent to existing Sheringham, Shoal and Dudgeon Wind Farms	719	up to 56		Fixed					Equinor	April 2024 - Project has Secured Development Consent DCO granted April 2024	
Llŷr 1	Wales	Off the coast of Pembrokeshire	100			Floating	2027		60-70	40	Floventis Energy	Benthic and geophysical surveys completed	
Llŷr 2	Wales	Off the coast of Pembrokeshire	100			Floating	2027		60-70	40	Floventis Energy	Benthic and geophysical surveys completed	
Whitecross	England	Off the Devon/Cornwall coast	100	up to 8		Floating				50	Offshore Wind Ltd		

== Decommissioned offshore wind farms ==
In October 2022, there was one offshore wind farm that had been decommissioned, consisting of two turbines with a combined capacity of 4 MW.

Name	Country	Location	Cap. (MW)	No.	Model	Project decommissioning	Strike price	Build cost	Cap. fac.	Depth range (m)	Km to shore	Owner	Refs.
Blyth Offshore	England	55°08′09″N 01°29′25″W	4	2	Vestas V66-2 MW	2019 March		£4m		6–11	1.6	E.ON	

== Cancelled Wind Farms ==
Several wind farms which have been significantly developed have subsequently been cancelled. These may be redeveloped in future. If there is an entry in the Strike Price column, this indicates that the project was previously awarded a Contract for Difference (CfD) and the project has been subsequently cancelled. Total capacity cancelled - 5.94 GW.

Name	Country	Location	Cap. (MW)	No.	Model	Project commis-sioning	Strike price	Depth range (m)	Km to shore	Owner	Notes	Refs.
Forthwind	Scotland		12			Originally 2023/24			1.5	Forthwind Limited	Awarded CfD in AR3, but cancelled in April 2024.	
Hornsea Four	England	TA042348	2400			Cancelled 2025	58.87			Ørsted		
Morgan	England	Off the coast of Barrow-In-Furness, West of Morecambe Bay	1500			Cancelled 2026		35	30	EnBW, BP	Signed lease with Crown Estate - Jan 2023 DCO granted July 2025	
TwinHub Floating Offshore Wind Project	England	Wave Hub, Cornwall	32			Cancelled March 2026	87.30			Hexicon	Awarded CfD in AR4, but terminated in March 2026 after developer wrote off costs in January	
CampionWind	Scotland	"Map Reference 4" Off the East coast of Scotland	2000					77	100	Shell	Lease returned	

== See also ==
- List of onshore wind farms in the United Kingdom
- Renewable energy in the United Kingdom
- Wind power in the United Kingdom
- List of offshore wind farms
- Lists of offshore wind farms by country
- Lists of offshore wind farms in the North Sea
- Lists of offshore wind farms in the Irish Sea
