= Inch Cape Wind Farm =

Offshore wind farm under construction in Scotland

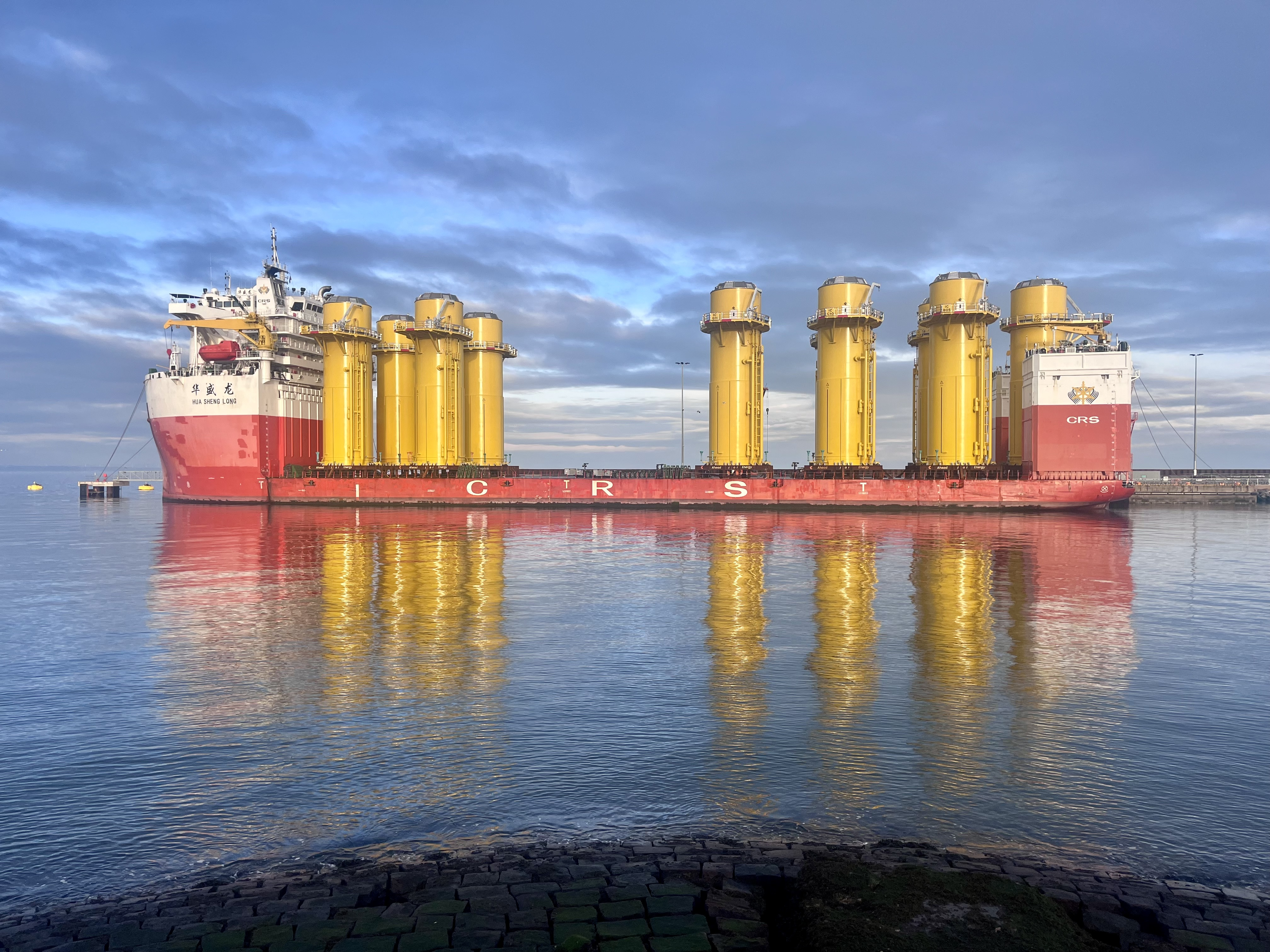
- Country: Scotland, UK
- Location: East of Arbroath
- Coordinates: 56°30′N 2°10′W
- Status: Under construction
- Owner: Inch Cape Offshore Limited
- Operators: Red Rock Renewables, ESB Group

Wind farm
- Type: Offshore

External links
- Website: https://inchcapewind.com

Inch Cape is an offshore wind farm under construction off the east coast of Scotland, approximately 20 kilometres (12 miles; 11 nautical miles) east of Arbroath, Angus. It is named after the nearby Inchcape reef. The project has a planned capacity of 1080 MW. It is being developed by Inch Cape Offshore Limited (ICOL), an equal joint venture between Edinburgh-based Red Rock Renewables and Irish ESB Group's Energy for Generations. First power is expected late in 2026, with the project fully operational in 2027.

The Inch Cape site covers an area of around 150 km^{2} (60 sq mi; 45 sq nmi) with water depths of 45 to 55 m (150 to 180 ft). The site is located 15 to 22 km (9 1/2 to 13 1/2 mi; 8 to 12 nmi) off the coast of Angus, with the boundary of the site 8 km (5 mi; 4 1/2 nmi) northeast of Inchcape and the Bell Rock Lighthouse. The Inch Cape windfarm is to the north of the Neart Na Gaoithe Wind Farm and southwest of the Seagreen Offshore Wind Farm.

When complete, the windfarm will have 72 Vestas V236–15.0 MW turbines, up to 274 m (900 ft) high. It will also feature a 66/220 kV offshore substation. Power will be transmitted 85 km (46 nmi) to shore via two 220 kV cables, with the onshore substation at the former Cockenzie power station in East Lothian, where it is connected to the National Grid. The subsea export cables are expected to be installed in 2025. Construction of the onshore substation commenced in early 2023. Between autumn 2024 and summer 2025, a section of the John Muir Way around the former power station needed to be diverted.

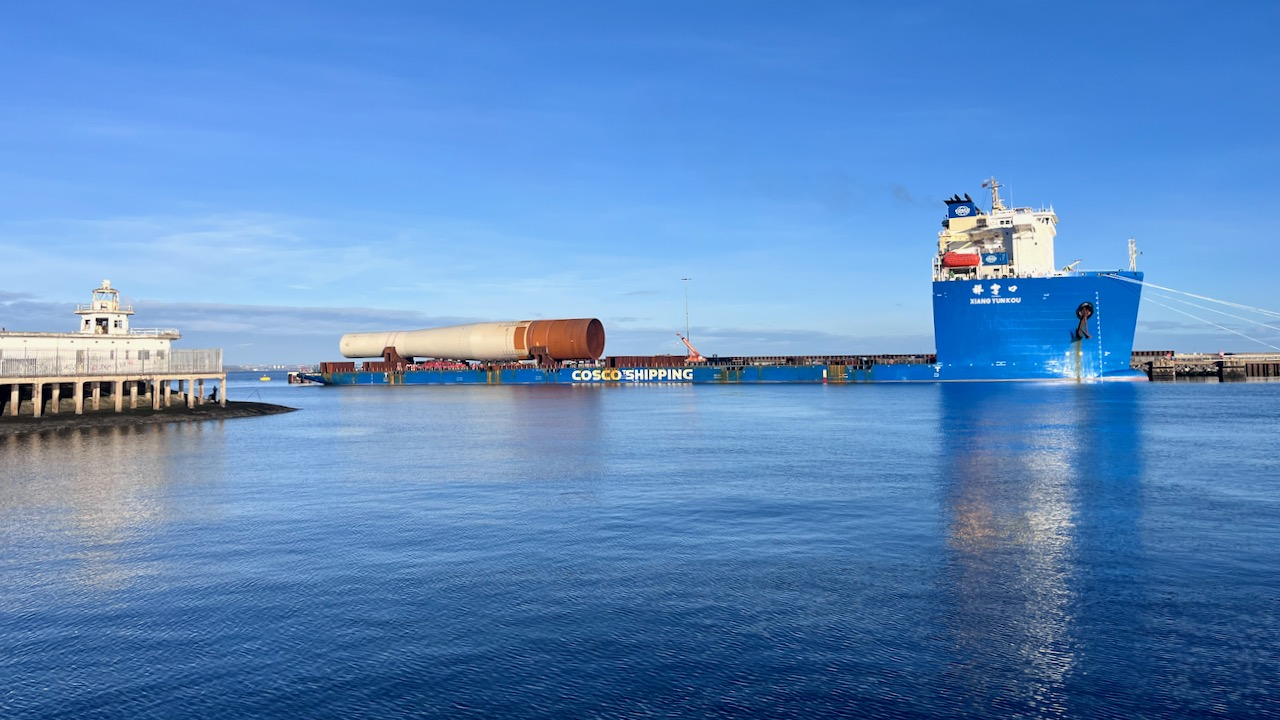
Heavy lift vessel Xiang Yunkou unloading monopile foundations at the Port of Leith in December 2025

The foundations for the turbines will mostly be XXL monopiles, up to 110 m (360 ft) long, with a maximum diameter of 11.5 m (40 ft) and mass of 2,500 tonnes. The project will use 54 monopile foundations and 18 three-legged pin-piled jacket foundations. These will be installed by Jan De Nul, with work commencing late in 2025, using a newly built quayside at the Port of Leith.

== Planning and consenting ==
In June 2011 ICOL was awarded an exclusivity agreement from The Crown Estate for the development area. This was in response to a 2008 call for proposals for offshore windfarms in Scottish coastal waters.

In 2014, the project gained the necessary consents for the offshore works, "Section 36" and Marine Licences, to build a windfarm of up to 110 turbines with a total power of 784 MW.

In 2016, the Royal Society for the Protection of Birds (RSPB) successfully challenged the plans to build the Inch Cape, Neart na Gaoithe, plus Seagreen Alpha and Bravo windfarms. This was reversed in May 2017 following appeal by the Scottish Government. In November 2017, RSPB Scotland was refused permission to appeal this decision in the Supreme Court.

A revised proposal was submitted in August 2018, for a reduced number of larger turbines, which was stated to improve the project economics. The proposed rotor diameter was increased to 250 m (820 ft) from the previous 172 m (564 ft), with maximum tip height increased to 291 m (955 ft) from 215 m (705 ft). However, the number of turbines was reduced to just 72 from the original 110, and the number of offshore substation platforms and export cables limited at two, rather than five and six previously. The revised proposal was granted in September 2019.

In August 2021, the Section 36 consent was amended to remove the 1 GW limit on the project size, which permits the use of more powerful turbines within the original size limits.

The project was awarded Contracts for Difference for 1080 MW under Allocation Round 4 in 2022, at 37.35 £_{2012}/MWh. In September 2024, 266.11 MW of this was awarded a higher price of 54.23 £_{2012}/MWh under the Offshore Wind Permitted Reduction scheme.

== Construction ==
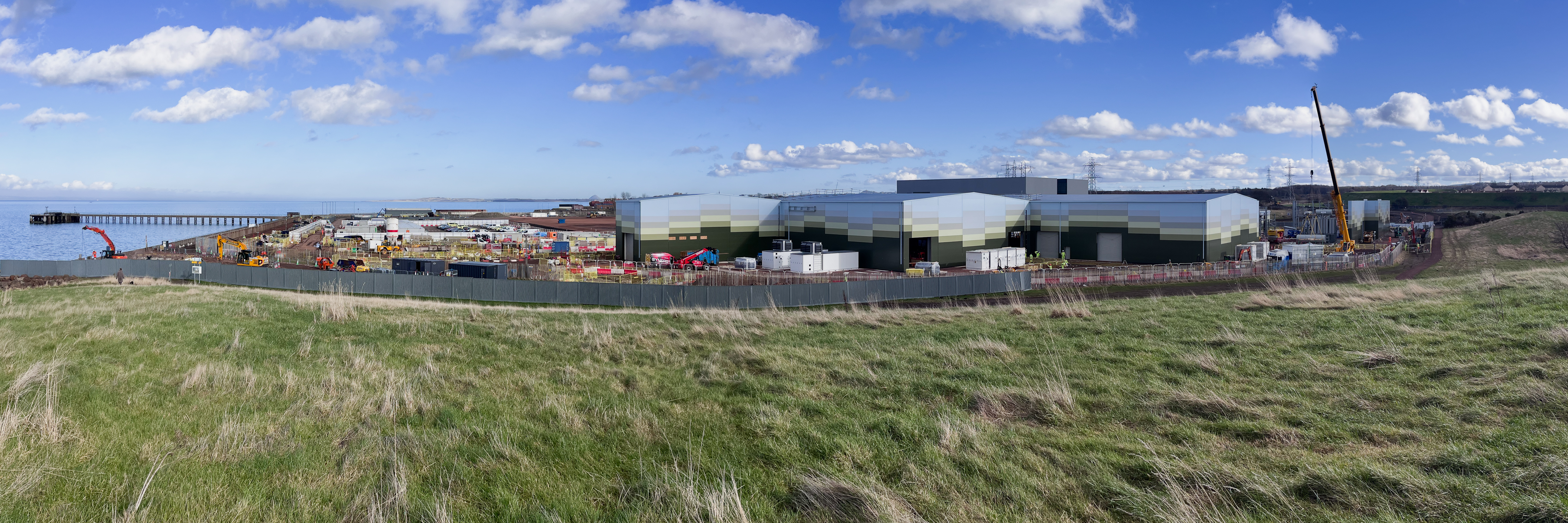
Panorama showing construction of the onshore substation for the Inch Cape Offshore Wind Farm on the site of the old Cockenzie Power Station

Siemens Energy were awarded the contract to construct the substations for the project, both offshore and onshore.

In January 2024, construction of the onshore substation started. The works are being undertaken for Siemens Energy by civil engineering contractor Careys.

In July/August 2025, the offshore substation was installed on a 68 m (223 ft) high jacket foundation. The 2700 tonne Offshore Transformer Module (OTM) was built by Siemens and for the first time contains two circuits, each comprising a transformer and reactor. It was fabricated and fitted out at the Smulders yard in Wallsend, by a team of over 250 people. The completed module was then transported to site on a barge and installed by the Heerema Marine Contractors semi-submersible crane vessel Sleipnir.

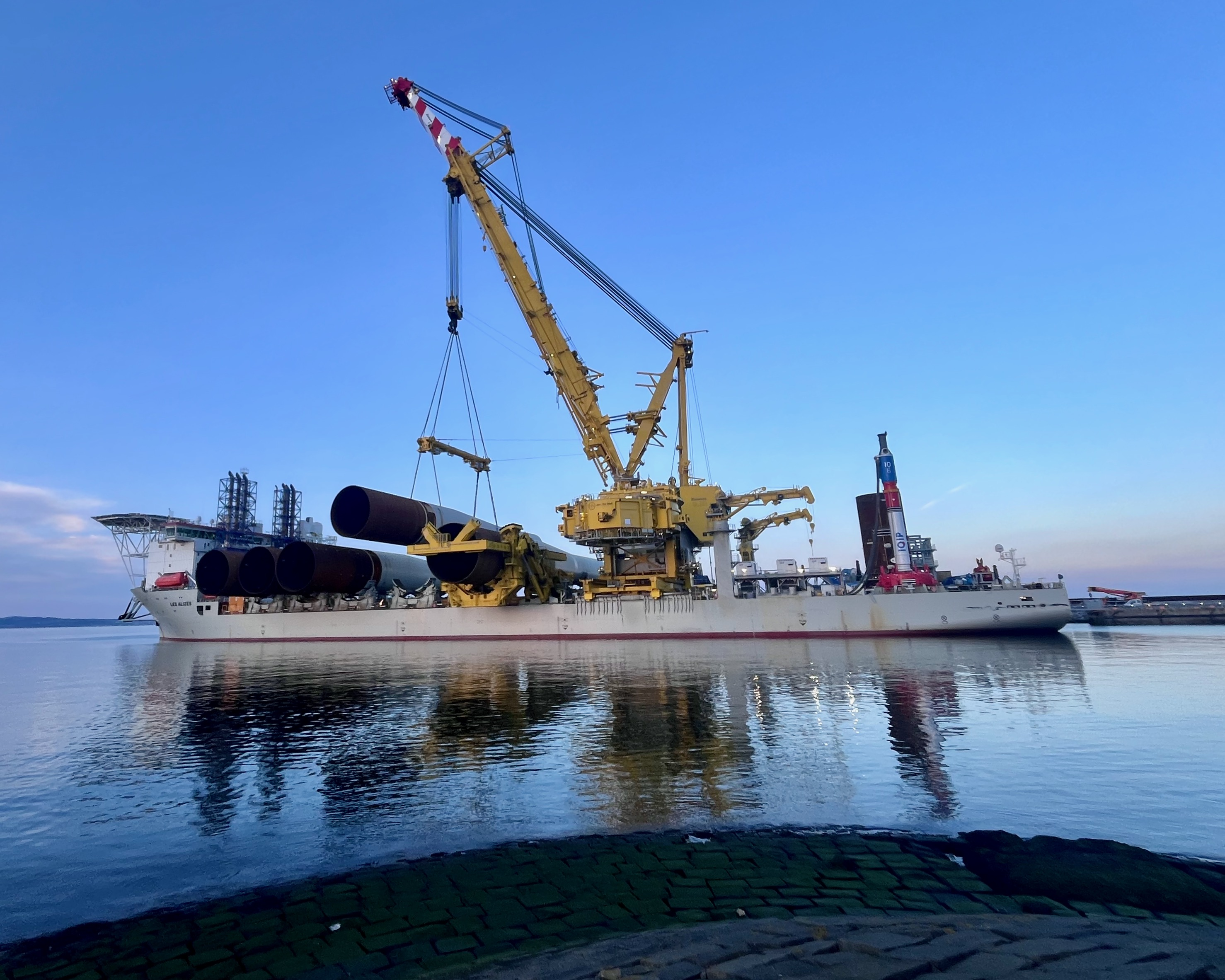
Les Alizés loading monopiles at Leith

On 31 August 2025, the first of 54 monopile foundations were shipped from CNOOD-Wenchong Heavy Industries in Qinzhou, China by the COSCO vessel XIAN TAI KOU, they arrived in mid October. The foundations are being installed by the Jan De Nul 5000 tonne capacity heavy-lift crane vessel Les Alizés. This vessel is capable of carrying five of the XXL monopiles from Leith to the site for installation, loading each monopile takes around an hour.

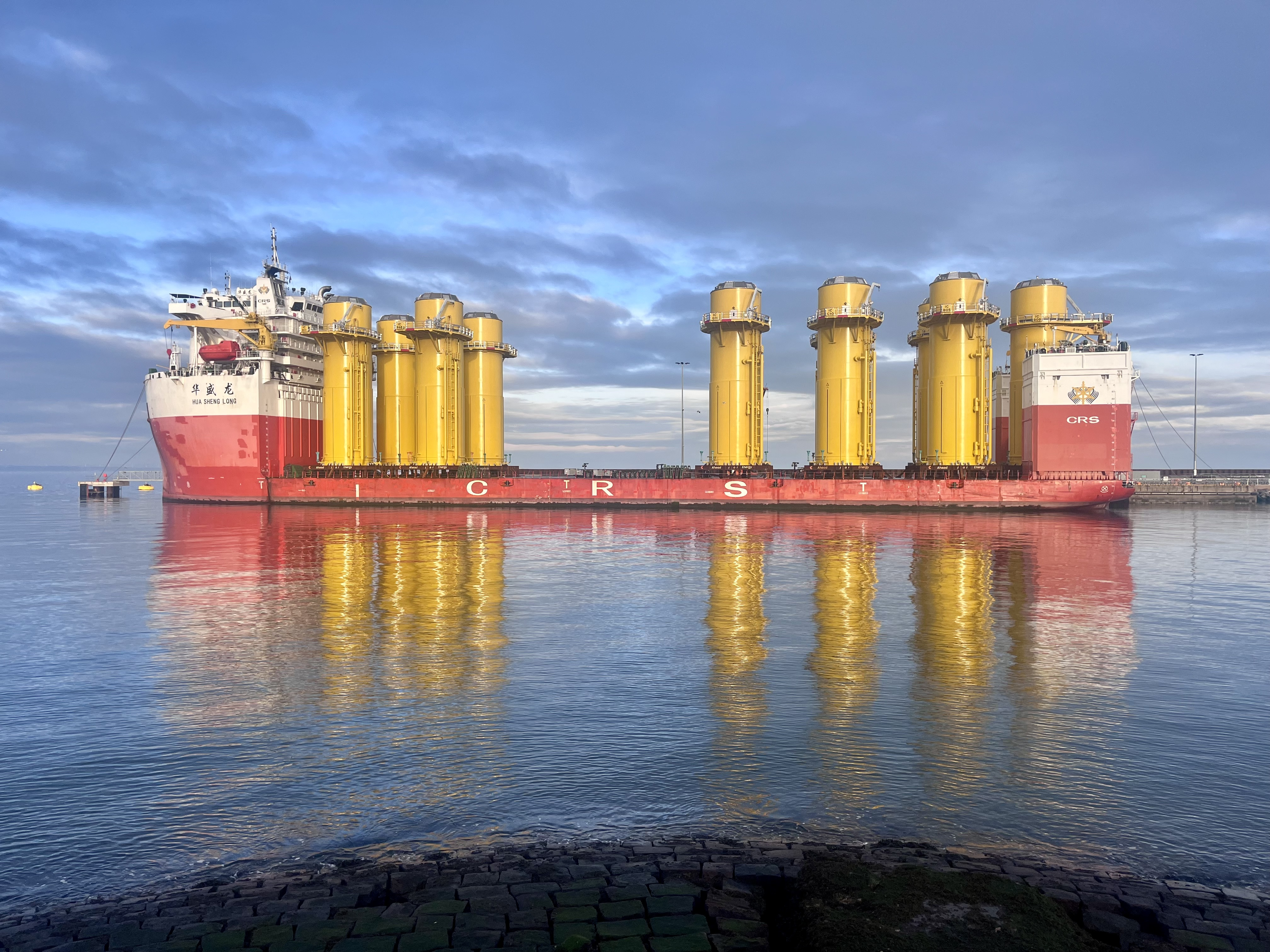
Hua Sheng Long unloading transition pieces in the Port of Leith

In October 2025, the first 85 km (53 mi) long subsea export cable was installed by Enshore Subsea using the CMOS Installer cable laying vessel. It was installed in three sections, each roughly 28 km (17 mi) long. These were joined onboard the North Sea Giant.

The first monopile was installed on 27 December 2025, and by June 2026, all 54 of the monopile foundations had been installed.

In January 2026, the first batch of 15 transition pieces arrived at the Port of Leith. These were manufactured by CNOOD-Wenchong Heavy Industries in China, and shipped on the COSCO heavy-lift vessel Hua Sheng Long. They arrived fully commissioned, each one 28 m (92 ft) high, 8.3 m (27 ft) diameter and weighing 600 tonnes.

== See also ==
- List of offshore wind farms in the United Kingdom
- Renewable energy in Scotland
