= Berwick Bank Wind Farm =

Proposed offshore wind farm in Scotland

- Country: Scotland, UK
- Location: East of Fife
- Coordinates: 56°20′N 1°37′W
- Status: Proposed
- Owner: SSE Renewables

External links
- Website: https://berwickbank.com

Berwick Bank is a proposed offshore wind farm in the outer Firth of Forth on the east coast of Scotland, being developed by SSE Renewables. It has a proposed capacity of 4.1 GW, with up to 307 turbines, making it one of the world's largest offshore wind farms, capable of meeting twice the household electricity demand of Scotland.

The site is located about 23 miles (37 km; 20 nmi) off the east coast of Scotland, to the north Berwick Bank, part of the Firth of Forth Banks Complex. The site covers an area of approximately 1,010 km^{2} (390 sq mi), around four times the size of Edinburgh, and overlaps the Berwick Bank and Marr Banks large-scale morphological features. It is situated to the east of the Neart Na Gaoithe and Inch Cape wind farms, and south of Seagreen Offshore Wind Farm.

RSPB Scotland and four other conservation charities objected to the proposal, citing the potential impact of seabirds. The project was approved in July 2023, subject to SSE Renewables producing a detailed seabird compensation plan, which would outline how any adverse impacts would be tackled.

The first stage was awarded Contracts for Difference to supply 1.4 GW of electricity in January 2026.

== Project description ==
The number and size of the wind turbines to be used for the project has not yet been decided, but the Environmental impact assessment considered up to 307 turbines, with a maximum rotor diameter of 222 to 310 m (728 to 1,017 ft). The largest proposed turbines would be six times the height of the Scott Monument.

The project site lies between the three designated areas of the Firth of Forth Banks Complex Marine Protected Area, and partially overlaps the Berwick Bank and Marr Banks. The water depth across the site is between 32.8 and 68.5 metres (108 and 225 ft) below lowest astronomical tide.

The wind farm will be at least 37.8 km (23.5 mi) from the Scottish coast, with the nearest point being St Abb's Head in the Scottish Borders. It will be 47.6 km (29.6 mi) from the East Lothian coastline, so not visible from there.

Two grid connection points have been secured, in East Lothian south of Dunbar and at Cambois near Blyth, Northumberland. The latter is subject to a separate consents process.

== History ==
The Berwick Bank wind farm was originally being developed as two projects, initially known as Seagreen 2 and 3 wind projects before being renamed as Berwick Bank and Marr Bank in 2020. They were combined into one larger project under the Berwick Bank name in September 2021.

In December 2022, the marine licence application was submitted, supported by an environmental impact assessment.

In April 2023, the project secured a grid connection at Branxton, near the Torness nuclear power station. This is the northern end of the Scotland-England Green Link 1 high-voltage direct current subsea power line under construction.

In July 2025, consent for the scheme was granted by Scottish Ministers, subject to conditions. These include developing a plan on mitigating adverse impacts on seabirds, which will also need to be approved by Scottish Ministers.

On 14 January 2026 it was announced that the Berwick Bank B part of the project had been successful in gaining Contracts for Difference in Allocation Round 7. These are for a total of 1.38 GW at £89.49/MWh (2024 prices) over a 20-year period. The target commissioning date for phase 1 of 3 is 31 March 2031.
