= Erebus (disambiguation) =

Erebus is the Greek god of darkness as well as a region of the Greek underworld.

Erebus may also refer to:

== Ships ==
- HMS Erebus, five ships of Britain's Royal Navy, most famously:
  - HMS Erebus (1826), a part of Franklin's failed expedition to find the Northwest Passage
- Erebus-class monitor, a class of Royal Navy ships
- USS Squando, briefly named Erebus (1869)

== Places ==
- Mount Erebus, an Antarctic volcano
- Erebus (crater), a crater on Mars
- Erebus Montes, a group of mountains on Mars

== Music ==
- Erebos (album), an album by Hate
- Erebus I, an extended play recording by American electronic music producer Notaker
- "Erebus", a 2004 song by The Amenta, from the album Occasus

== Other uses ==
- Erebus (moth), a genus of noctuid moths
- Erebus crystal, a type of feldspar
- Erebus Motorsport, an Australian motor racing team
- Erebus Offshore Wind Farm, proposed project in the Celtic Sea off Pembrokeshire, Wales
- Mount Erebus disaster, a DC-10 crash on the Antarctic mountain in 1979
  - Erebus: The Aftermath, a New Zealand television miniseries about the accident
