= Seagreen Offshore Wind Farm =

Offshore wind farm in Scotland

Seagreen
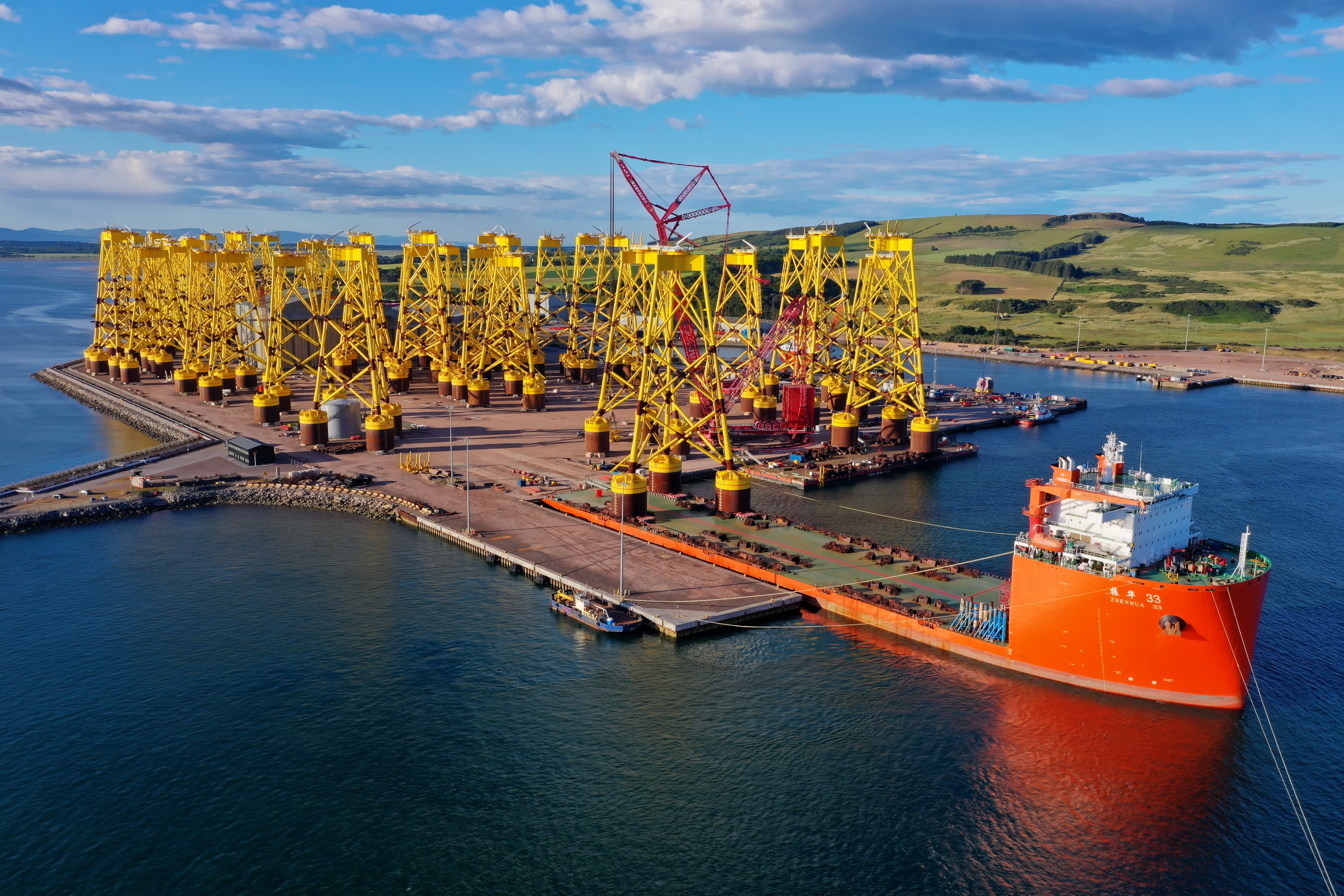
- Country: United Kingdom
- Coordinates: 56°35′17″N 1°44′28″W
- Status: Operational
- Construction began: October 2021
- Commission date: 22 August 2022; October 2023
- Owners: SSE Renewables; TotalEnergies
- Operator: SSE Renewables

Wind farm
- Type: Offshore
- Max. water depth: 58.6 m (192 ft)
- Distance from shore: 27 km (17 mi)
- Rotor diameter: 164 m (538 ft)
- Site area: 2,850 km^{2} (1,100 sq mi)

Power generation
- Units operational: 114 × 10 MW
- Make and model: MHI Vestas V164-10MW (114)
- Nameplate capacity: 1,075 MW

External links
- Website: www.seagreenwindenergy.com
- Commons: Related media on Commons

Wind farm layout

Seagreen is an offshore wind farm located in the North Sea off the coast of Angus, Scotland, with a rated power of almost 1.1 GW. It is a joint venture between SSE Renewables and TotalEnergies, who were granted exclusive development rights to the Firth of Forth zone of development by the Crown Estate in 2010. Consent for the first phase was granted in 2014, construction commenced in 2021, and the farm became fully operational in 2023.

The site is located approximately 27 km (17 mi) offshore, East of Arbroath. The onshore maintenance base for the project is located in Montrose Port.

The Seagreen 1A extension to the wind farm was approved in 2022, with an additional 36 turbines bringing the total capacity to over 1.5 GW.

== Technology ==
The wind farm consists of 114 Vestas V164 wind turbines with a capacity of 10 MW each. The farm has a total capacity of 1,075 MW, and became the largest offshore wind farm in Scotland when it became fully operational in 2023. At that point, it also had the world's deepest bottom-fixed foundations, with a maximum depth of 58.7 m (193 ft).

The turbines are installed on steel jacket foundations, each weighing around 2000 tonnes. The jackets are tripod, with suction bucket foundations, installed in 42 to 58 m (138 to 190 ft) water depth by Saipem.

Power is brought ashore via subsea cable to Carnoustie, then by underground cable to Tealing Substation, north of Dundee. Horizontal directional drilling was used in eight locations of the onshore cable route to pass under obstacles including the main Edinburgh to Aberdeen railway, the A90 and A92 trunk roads, and Barry Links Site of Special Scientific Interest (SSSI). The principle contract for the cabling work was Nexans.

== History ==
Originally, Seagreen was to be developed as two projects Alpha and Bravo, however these were later combined as the Seagreen 1 project. The adjacent projects, Seagreen 2 and 3 were renamed as Berwick Bank and Marr Bank, then combined under the name Berwick Bank.

In 2012, applications were submitted for the Seagreen Alpha and Seagreen Bravo projects. Angus Council granted planning approval in principle for the onshore grid connection works in 2013. In October 2014, the Scottish Government granted planning consent for the offshore works.

In 2016, the Royal Society for the Protection of Birds (RSPB) successfully challenged the plans to build the Seagreen Alpha and Bravo wind farms, as well as nearby Inch Cape and Neart na Gaoithe. This was reversed in May 2017 following appeal by the Scottish Government. In November 2017, RSPB Scotland was refused permission to appeal this decision in the Supreme Court.

In 2018, a revised application was submitted to use fewer but larger wind turbines.

In September 2019, as part of Allocation Round 3, the project was awarded Contracts for Difference to supply electricity for 454 MW of capacity, with the first of three phases to be delivered in 2024/25.

In 2020, planning consent was awarded for the onshore connection, for the Tealing Substation in January, and for the cable route in June.

In October 2021, work started on installation of the jacket foundations. The first two were installed by the semi-submersible crane vessel Saipem 7000, having been transported by barge from Broughty Ferry, Dundee. The jackets were manufactured overseas, and transported via the Port of Nigg, with 23 shipments required for the 114 foundations.

In December 2021, the installation of the turbines started, with the final turbine installed in June 2023. First power was generated from the wind farm in August 2022. The Seagreen project was the first Vestas V164-10.0 turbine installed globally, and was also the first turbine rated at 10 MW in Europe.

=== Seagreen 1A extension ===
The project was originally proposed to have 150 turbines, but was reduced to just 114 larger turbines producing the same power.

There are now plans to extend the wind farm to 1.5 GW with an additional 36 turbines from the original consent for 150. The Marine Licence application for this was approved in December 2021, and the Section 36C consent awarded in October 2022.

Also in October 2022, approval was given to increase Seagreen 1A to 500 MW, from the original 360 MW, bring the project total to 1.575 GW. The height and diameter of the turbines now proposed are larger than the existing turbines. The substation for phase 1A will be at the former Cockenzie power station in East Lothian.

== Curtailment ==
As a result of grid constraints, the Seagreen wind farm was curtailed for 71% of the time it was expected to have operated in 2024, leading to payments of £65m. This increased slightly to 77% of the output being curtailed in 2025. According to the National Energy System Operator, around 2.4% of consumer bills are spent on curtailment payments. Gas plants are fired in southern England instead.

== See also ==
- Wind power in the United Kingdom
