= Rampion Wind Farm =

Wind farm off the Sussex coast

Rampion Offshore Wind Farm
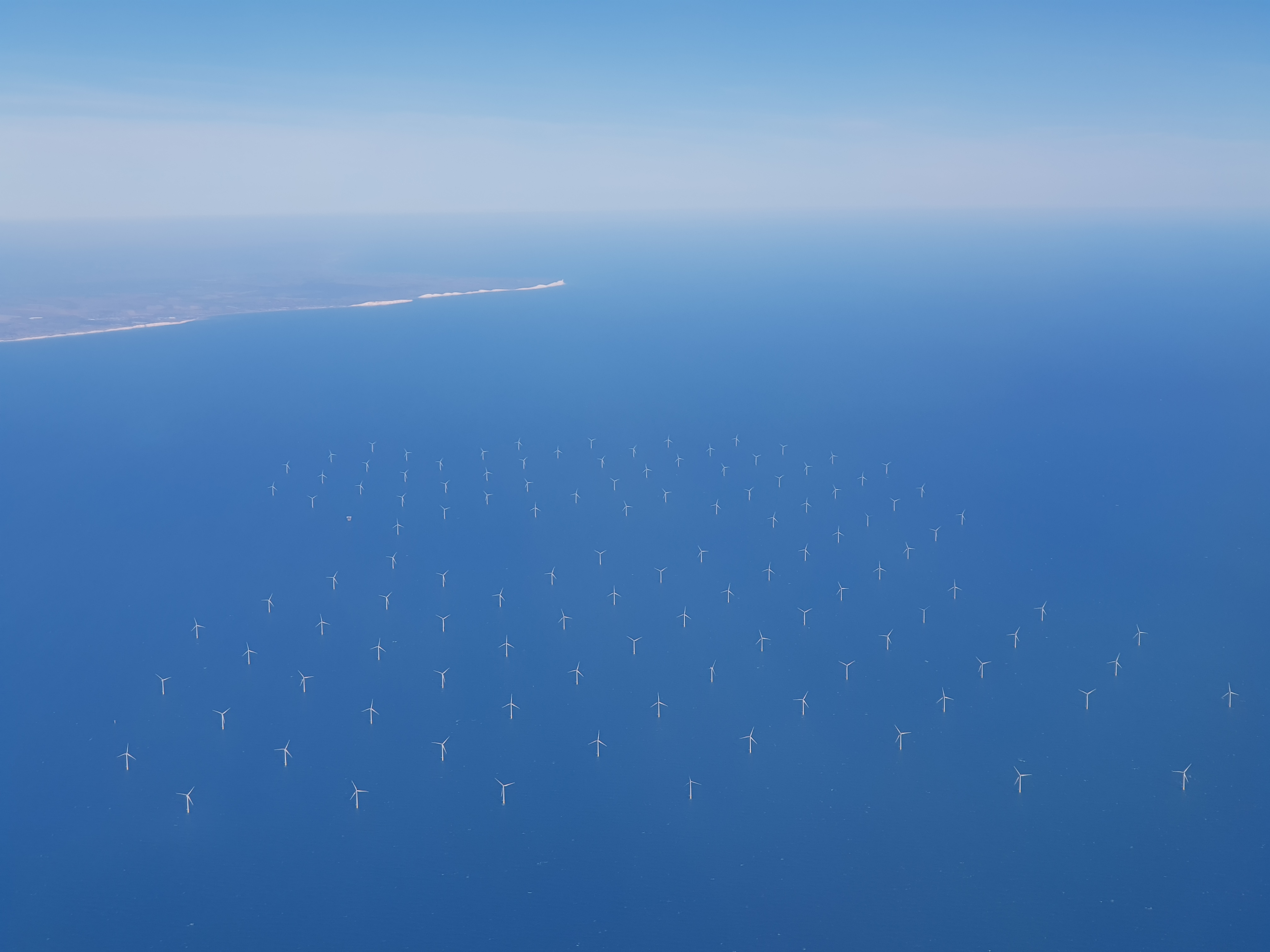
- Country: United Kingdom
- Location: English Channel, off the coast of Sussex
- Coordinates: 50°39′53″N 0°16′44″W
- Status: Operational
- Construction began: 2015
- Commission date: November 2017
- Construction cost: £1.3 billion
- Owners: Enbridge; Green Investment Group; RWE AG
- Operator: RWE AG

Wind farm
- Type: Offshore
- Distance from shore: 13 km (8.1 mi)
- Hub height: 80 m (262.5 ft)
- Rotor diameter: 112 m (367 ft)
- Site area: 72 km^{2} (27.8 sq mi)

Power generation
- Units operational: 116 × 3.45 MW
- Make and model: MHI Vestas V112-3.45 MW (116)
- Nameplate capacity: 400 MW

External links
- Website: www.rampionoffshore.com
- Commons: Related media on Commons

Wind farm layout

Rampion is an offshore wind farm developed by E.ON, now operated by RWE, off the Sussex coast in the UK. The wind farm has a capacity of 400 MW, although 700 MW was originally planned. The wind farm was commissioned in April 2018 and was the first offshore wind farm on the south coast of England.

== Location ==
Located between 13 and 25 km (8 and 16 miles) from the shore, the wind farm is situated off the coast of the towns of Worthing and Shoreham-by-Sea to the west, the city of Brighton and Hove in the centre and the towns of Newhaven and Seaford in the east. The wind farm lies in a zone that is an irregular elongated area, approximately 28 km (17 miles) in an east to west direction and approximately 10 km (6.2 miles) in the north to south direction, an area of 72 km^{2} (27.8 square miles).

== Name ==
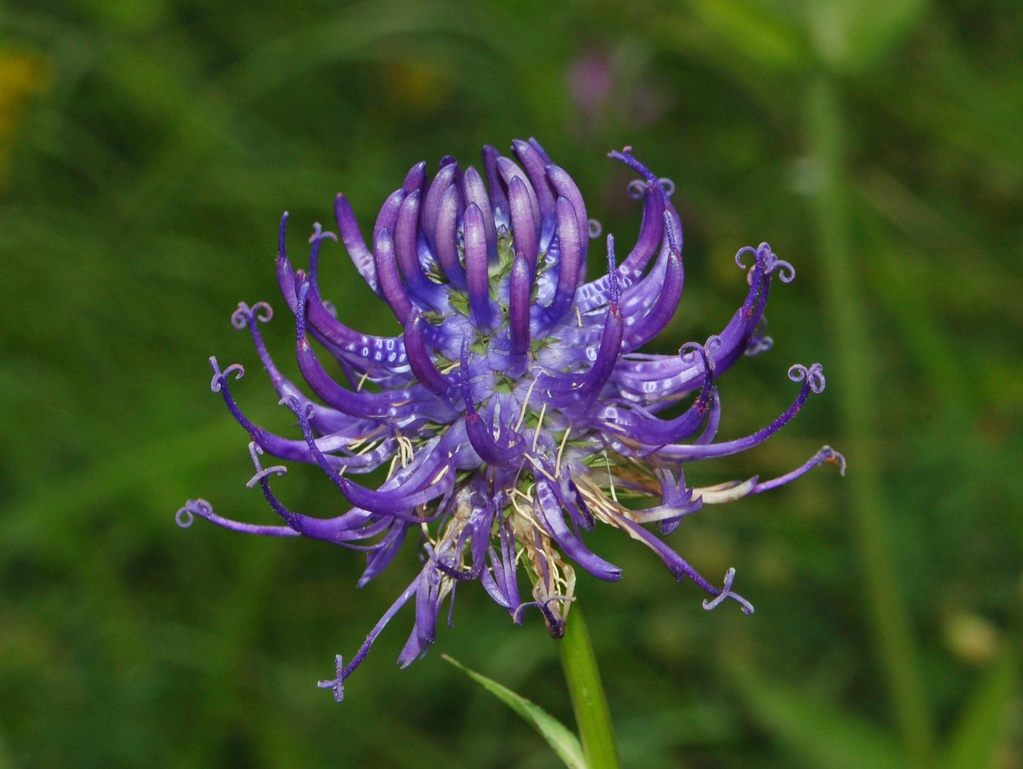
Flowers of the round-headed rampion, or Pride of Sussex, the county flower of Sussex

Initially known as Zone 6 off the Sussex coast, it was later named the "Southern Array" (Hastings).

When the site of the wind farm was changed from near Hastings to off Brighton, E.ON held a competition with local schools to suggest a new name as a public relations exercise. The name Rampion was voted the winning suggestion, submitted by Davison High School Pupil Megan McCullough, after the round-headed rampion (Phyteuma orbiculare), also known as the Pride of Sussex, the county flower of Sussex.

== Planning and construction ==
E.ON's final plans use 116 turbines of approximately 3.45 MW capacity, each 140 m (459.3 ft) high to the tip of the blade, blade length is 55 m (180 ft), and radius is 12 m (39 ft), which represents a 43% reduction in the size of the development after planning consent was granted.

E.ON originally proposed using either 175 smaller turbines of 3–3.6 MW capacity, each 180 m (590.6 ft) above low tide sea level, or 100 larger turbines of 7 MW capacity, each 210 m (689.0 ft) above sea level. Development and construction costs were estimated at £2 billion. As the turbines are designed to last approximately 20–25 years, and since E.ON's lease of the site from the Crown Estate is for 50 years, the company would eventually need to replace the turbines.

After an 18-month evaluation process between Newhaven and Shoreham ports, E.ON chose Newhaven as the base for its operations and maintenance facility. The company took a lease on a site at the Port of Newhaven, where it constructed two new buildings to house the administration and engineering functions of the wind farm. The site and associated buildings act as the combined servicing point for the wind farm.

The project was approved by the government in July 2014. In November 2014, E.ON announced that it had reduced the proposed capacity of the project by approximately 40%. Onshore construction work began in June 2015 with construction of a new electricity substation adjacent to the existing National Grid Bolney 400/132 kV substation near Twineham. Off shore the 116 monopile foundations were piled into the sea bed and on completion of this the first wind turbine was lifted into place in March 2017. Coincident with this was the ongoing work to backfill the cable duct trenches off Lancing beach initially due to be completed in Spring 2017. Installation of the remainder of the 150 kV cable through to Bolney and the burying in the sea bed of the 33 kV inter array cables was also completed during this time following the installation of a 2,000-tonne offshore 33/150 kV substation that was completed in April 2017. An excavator was stranded and disabled after completing cable trench backfilling work in April 2017; it was removed in June 2017. Electricity production commenced during November 2017. Construction of the wind farm was completed in 2018 at a cost of £1.3 billion.

In 2020, Rampion exceeded its power generation targets by generating 1,600 GWh over the year, 15% more than the assumed annual generation of 1,400 GWh and resulting in an average power output of 183 MW.

== Rampion 2 ==
Rampion 2 is a proposed second wind farm to the immediate south west of the current Rampion installation. Plans include larger wind turbines compared with the first Rampion wind farm, expected to stand up to 325 m (1,066 ft) above the highest tide and producing up to 1,200 MW of power. If plans are approved construction could start in 2027, and the site could be operational by 2030.

In September 2023, the Planning Inspectorate accepted the application for examination.

On 4 April 2025, Rampion 2 was granted development consent by the Secretary of State for Energy Security and Net Zero.

Rampion 2 did not secure a CfD to supply electricity during the January 2026 auction round 7 ("AR7").

== See also ==
- List of offshore wind farms in the United Kingdom
- Wind power in the United Kingdom
