= East Anglia Array =

Offshore Wind farm in the North sea

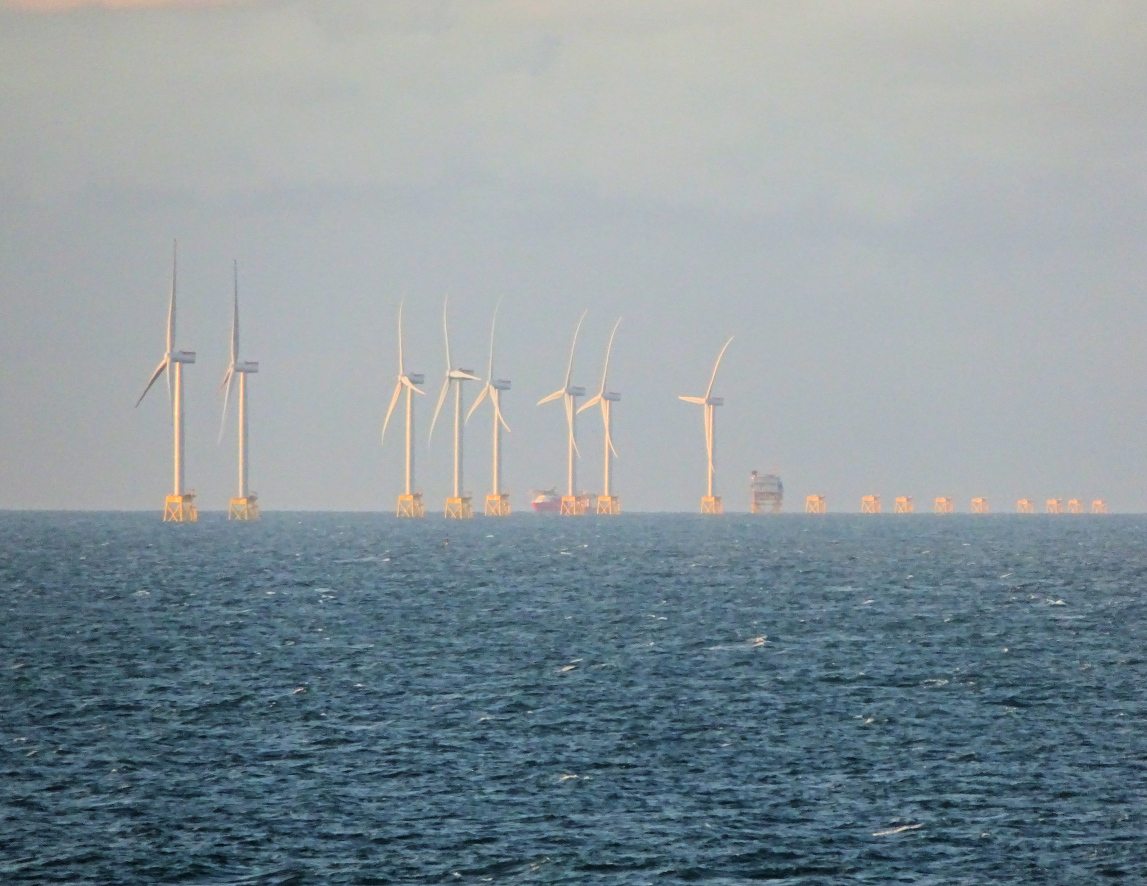
- East Anglia ONE wind farm during construction
- Country: England, United Kingdom
- Location: North Sea
- Coordinates: 52°54′28″N 2°37′43″E
- Status: Operational
- Construction began: June 2018
- Commission date: July 2020
- Construction cost: £ 2.5 billion
- Owners: ScottishPower (60%); Bilbao Offshore Holding Limited (40%)

Wind farm
- Type: Offshore
- Max. water depth: 53 m (174 ft)
- Distance from shore: 45.4 km (28.2 mi) (minimum)
- Hub height: 120 m
- Rotor diameter: 170 m
- Site area: 300 km^{2} (116 mi^{2})

Power generation
- Units operational: 102
- Units planned: 300
- Nameplate capacity: 714 MW (2100 MW planned)

External links
- Website: scottishpowerrenewables.com

Wind farm layout

The East Anglia Array is a series of proposed and constructed offshore wind farms located around 30 miles off the east coast of East Anglia, in the North Sea, England. It has begun with the currently operational East Anglia ONE, that has been developed in partnership by ScottishPower Renewables and Bilbao Offshore Holding Limited. Up to six individual projects could be set up in the area with a maximum capacity of up to 7.2 GW. The first project, East Anglia ONE at 714 MW, received planning consent in June 2014 and contracts in April 2016. Offshore construction began in 2018 and the project was commissioned in July 2020. It is expected to cost £2.5 billion.

== Planning ==
The East Anglia Zone is in the North Sea off the east coast of East Anglia. It is one of nine offshore zones belonging to the Crown Estate which formed part of the third licence round for UK offshore wind farms. At the closest point the zone is 14 km from shore. East Anglia Offshore Wind (EAOW) is a partnership between ScottishPower Renewables and Vattenfall. In December 2009, EAOW was announced as the developer for the East Anglia Zone.

The target capacity for the entire East Anglia Zone is 7200 MW which could require up to 1200 turbines. Up to six individual projects could be set up in the area. The first project is the East Anglia ONE windfarm, which was commissioned in July 2020. EAOW has planning permission granted for East Anglia THREE, and has announced plans for further projects named East Anglia TWO and East Anglia ONE North. If consents are received, all three new arrays will be built as a hub, combining to provide a rated capacity of 3.1GW of electricity from 263 wind turbines. Funding has been agreed to improve local activities, courtesy of the Sizewell C and East Anglia Array projects. Local opposition groups approve of the offshore wind turbines, but request a different location for the onshore facilities.

== East Anglia ONE ==
East Anglia ONE is located in the southern area of the East Anglia Zone, and is approximately 43 km (27 miles) from the shore. The initial proposal was for an installed capacity of 1200 MW. Cabling for East Anglia ONE lands near the River Deben at Bawdsey, runs north of Ipswich and is connected to the National Grid at Bramford.

A plan was formally submitted to the government in December 2012, and planning consent was granted in June 2014. In October 2014 ScottishPower announced that it intended to scale down East Anglia ONE because of insufficient subsidies. In February 2015 it was announced that ScottishPower would proceed with a scaled-down 714 MW project.

A contract for difference with a strike price of £119/MWh was awarded on 27 April 2016, using 102 Siemens Wind Power direct-drive 7 MW turbines. Nacelles were built in Cuxhaven, while blades were made in Hull. Due to water depths between 30–40 m, the turbines use jacketed foundations. Cabling is at 66 kV as opposed to the traditional 33 kV. Two export cables at 220 kV alternating current send the power to shore. A support vessel is powered by used vegetable oil.

=== Construction ===
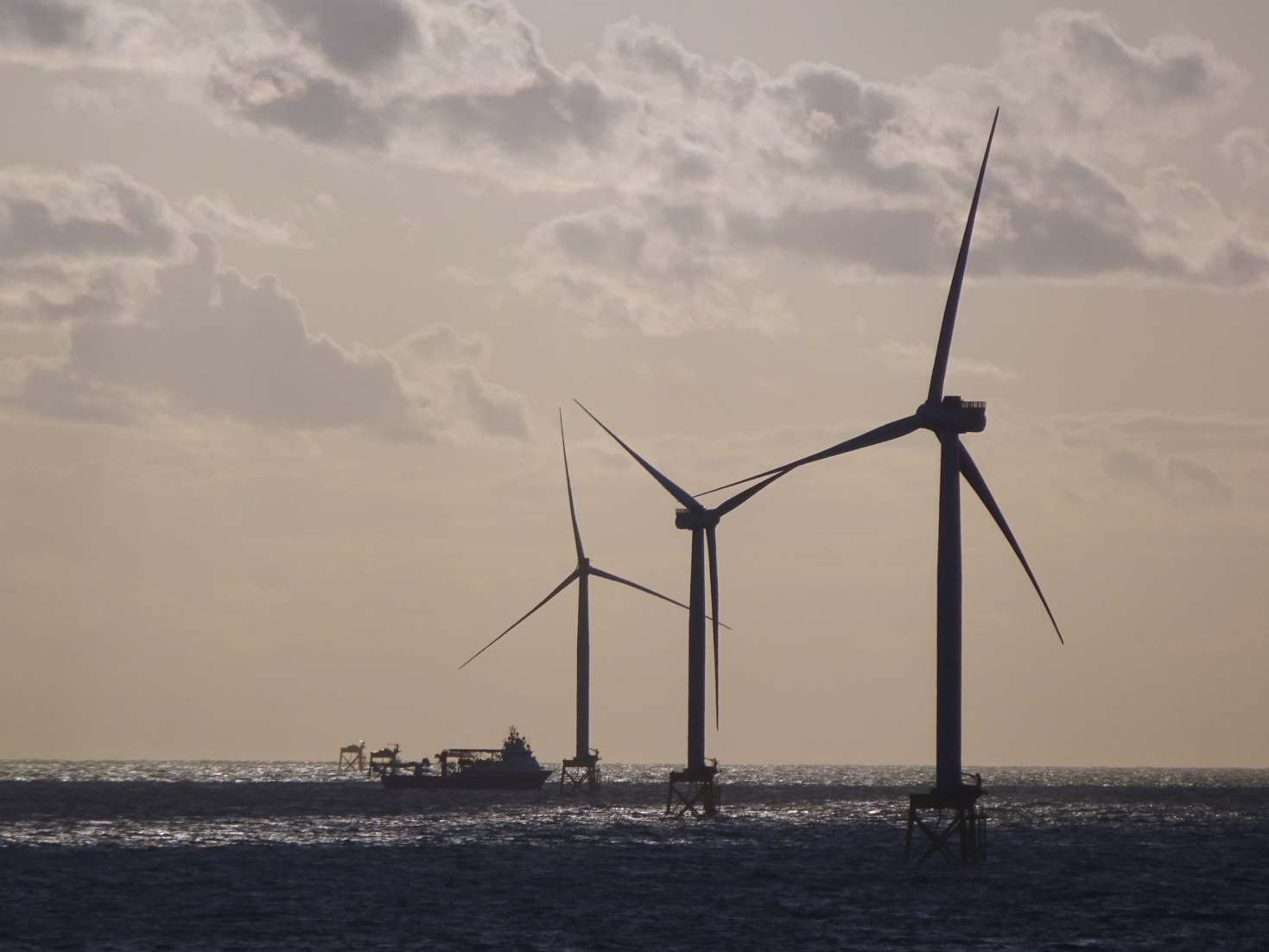
East Anglia ONE windfarm construction, October 2019

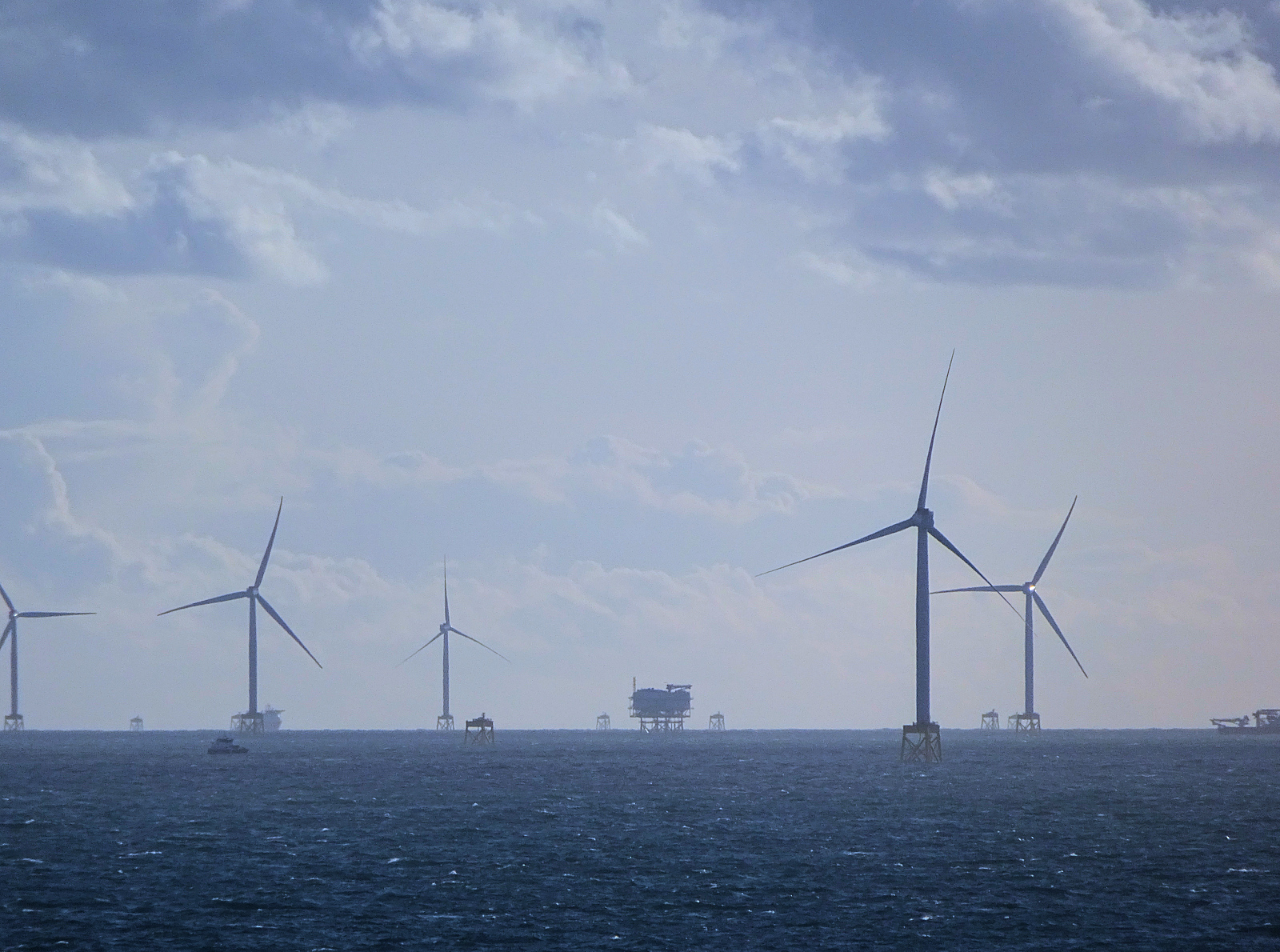
Offshore substation located amongst the turbines

Onshore construction began in 2017, with offshore construction starting in 2018. The first foundation was completed in June 2018 and the first turbine was completed in June 2019. The windfarm's offshore substation was installed in August 2018.

First power was generated in September 2019, turbine installation was completed in April 2020, and commercial operation began in July 2020.

== East Anglia TWO ==
The East Anglia TWO wind farm will be located be 37.5 kilometres (23.3 mi) off-shore from Lowestoft and would have a generating capacity of 960MW from 64 Siemens Gamesa SG14-236 DD turbines. The project was granted a Development Consent Order in March 2022 and is planned to be ready by 2028. In October 2024, £4bn was committed to the project.

In 2024 ScottishPower obtained a Contract for Difference for the contract with a strike price of GBP 58.87/MWh.

In 2026 substation construction has started and vertical drilling support barge positioned offshore.

== East Anglia THREE ==
The under construction East Anglia THREE wind farm is located in the northern half of the East Anglia Zone, and is approximately 69 km (42 miles) from the shore. Once completed it will have an installed capacity of 1372MW from 95 Siemens Gamesa 14+MW Wind turbines. The project was consented in 2017 and is planned to be operational in 2026.

Grid connection cabling for East Anglia THREE follows the same path (and ducting was laid at the same time) as for East Anglia One. It lands near the River Deben at Bawdsey, runs north of Ipswich and is connected to the National Grid at Bramford.

In 2022 the UK Government awarded East Anglia THREE a Contract for Difference (CfD) for 1372MW of capacity at a strike price of GBP 37.35/MWh.. In 2024 a CfD for an additional 159 MW of capacity was awarded at GBP 54.23/MWh, an overall weighted average price of GBP 39.10/MWh.

=== Construction ===
Onshore construction commenced in July 2022. The first monopile and transition piece were placed on 18 April 2025. The 10,700 tonne high voltage direct current transformer was installed in October 2025. It was lifted into place using the SSCV Sleipnir, the world's largest crane vessel.

== East Anglia ONE North ==
The proposed East Anglia ONE North wind farm will be located approximately 37.7 kilometres (23.4 mi) from Lowestoft, and would have a generating capacity of up to 800MW. The project was granted a Development Consent Order in March 2022 and is planned to be ready by 2030.
