= Pentland Floating Offshore Wind Farm =

Proposed floating wind farm in northern Scotland

- Country: Scotland, United Kingdom
- Location: Pentland Firth, north of Dounreay
- Coordinates: 58°37.776′N 3°50.422′W
- Status: Proposed
- Commission date: Expected 2030

Wind farm
- Type: Offshore
- Site area: 35.3 km^{2} (13.6 sq mi)

Power generation
- Units planned: 6 × 15.4 MW
- Nameplate capacity: 92.5 MW (proposed)

External links
- Website: https://pentlandfloatingwind.com/

The Pentland Floating Offshore Wind Farm, previously known as Dounreay Trì is a proposed project located in the Pentland Firth, north of the Scottish mainland which will use six floating wind turbines. The project is located about 7.5 km (4.7 mi; 4.0 nmi) offshore from Dounreay, in Caithness.

The project is being developed by Highland Wind Limited, which has a majority of funds managed by Copenhagen Infrastructure Partners (CIP). Other partners include Eurus Energy and Hexicon. Construction and operations are expected to create around 1000 jobs and provide power for 70,000 homes, according to the developers.

In January 2026, Phase 1 of the project was awarded Contracts for Difference for 92.5 MW at £216.49/MWh (2024 prices), as part of the seventh Allocation Round. The final investment decision is expected in 2027.

== Development, planning and consenting ==
In February 2017, The Highland Council granted permission for the Dounreay Trì project. This proposed two 154 m (505 ft) diameter turbines mounted on a triangular floating platform, moored about 6 km (3.7 mi; 3.2 nmi) offshore, plus subsea cables and an onshore substation building. In March 2017, the Scottish Government also approved the 12 MW project, making it the third floating wind project in Scotland after Hywind Scotland and Kincardine floating offshore wind farm. However, progress on the project stalled.

In 2017, the project was put up for sale. It would have been eligible for subsidy in the form of 3.5 Renewables Obligation Certificates (ROCs) per MWh, if construction had been completed by the September 2018 deadline.

In 2021, the project was revived by CIP, setting up Highland Wind Limited to develop the project, renamed as the Pentland Floating Offshore Wind Farm. A new application would be submitted for the revised proposals, with commissioning expected in 2026.

Offshore environmental surveys for the project were conducted from summer 2021 to summer 2023.

In 2022, prior to an application to Marine Scotland, the consortium developing the project halved the proposed area. It also reduced the maximum number of turbines to seven, from the previous proposals for ten. At that point, the project was expected to be developed in two phases, starting with a single demonstrator expected in 2025, followed by a further six turbines in 2026.

In November 2022, the planning application was submitted to the Highland Council. The onshore works were granted planning permission in principle in January 2023.

In April 2024, Eurus Energy UK invested in the project, becoming a part owner in the project with CIP as the majority shareholder.

In November 2025, up to £50m of investment in the project from the National Wealth Fund, Great British Energy and the Scottish National Investment Bank was announced.

The operations and maintenance base for the project is expected to be built at Scrabster Harbour.

== See also ==
- List of offshore wind farms in the United Kingdom
- Renewable energy in the United Kingdom
- Renewable energy in Scotland
