= Cockenzie power station =

Former coal-fired power station in Scotland

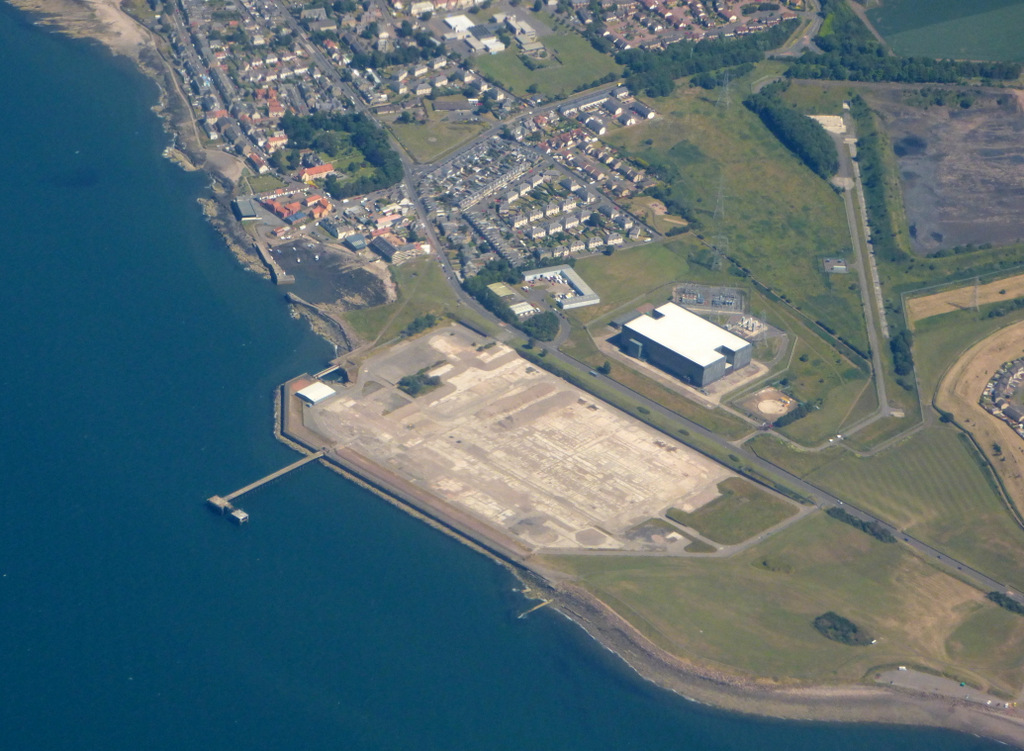
- Cockenzie Power Station (after clearance) from the air
- Country: Scotland
- Location: Cockenzie
- Coordinates: 55°58′06″N 2°58′18″W
- Status: Demolished
- Construction began: 1959
- Commission date: 1967
- Decommission date: 15 March 2013
- Operators: South of Scotland Electricity Board (1967–1991); Scottish Power (1991–2013)

Thermal power station
- Primary fuel: Coal

Power generation
- Nameplate capacity: 1,200 MW

External links
- Commons: Related media on Commons

Cockenzie power station was a coal-fired power station in East Lothian, Scotland. It was situated on the south shore of the Firth of Forth, between the town of Prestonpans and the villages of Cockenzie and Port Seton, 8 mi (13 km) east of the Scottish capital of Edinburgh. The station dominated the local coastline with its distinctive twin chimneys from 1967 until the chimneys' demolition in September 2015. Initially operated by the nationalised South of Scotland Electricity Board, it was operated by Scottish Power following the privatisation of the industry in 1991. In 2005 a WWF report named Cockenzie as the UK's least carbon-efficient power station, in terms of carbon dioxide released per unit of energy generated.

The 1,200 megawatt power station ceased generating energy on 15 March 2013 around 8.30am. There are plans to replace the station with a combined cycle gas turbine (CCGT) power station. The removal of the power station was done in stages with the twin chimneys and turbine hall being demolished in a controlled explosion on 26 September 2015, the front section of the boiler house on 4 November 2015 and the rest of the boiler house on 17 December 2015. This was the last remaining major structure to be removed.

== History ==
Under a design by the firm of celebrated architect Sir Robert Matthew, construction of Cockenzie power station began in 1959 on the site of the former Preston Links Colliery. The site is also thought to have been the hiding place of General John Cope after the defeat of his army at the Battle of Prestonpans on 21 September 1745. Much of the electrical equipment for the station was manufactured by Bruce Peebles & Co., Edinburgh. SSEB set aside £60 million for the station's construction; the final cost was £54 million, around £6 million under budget.

The station began generating electricity in 1967 for the then South of Scotland Electricity Board (SSEB). It was officially opened on 24 May 1968 by William Ross, Secretary of State for Scotland. In 2000-01, Cockenzie generated a record load factor, supplying 3,563 GWh of electricity and burning 1,500,000 tonnes of coal.

The power station occupied a 24-hectare (59-acre) site. It generated electricity at a frequency of 50 hertz using four identical 300-megawatt (MW) generating units, for a peak supply of 1200 MW.

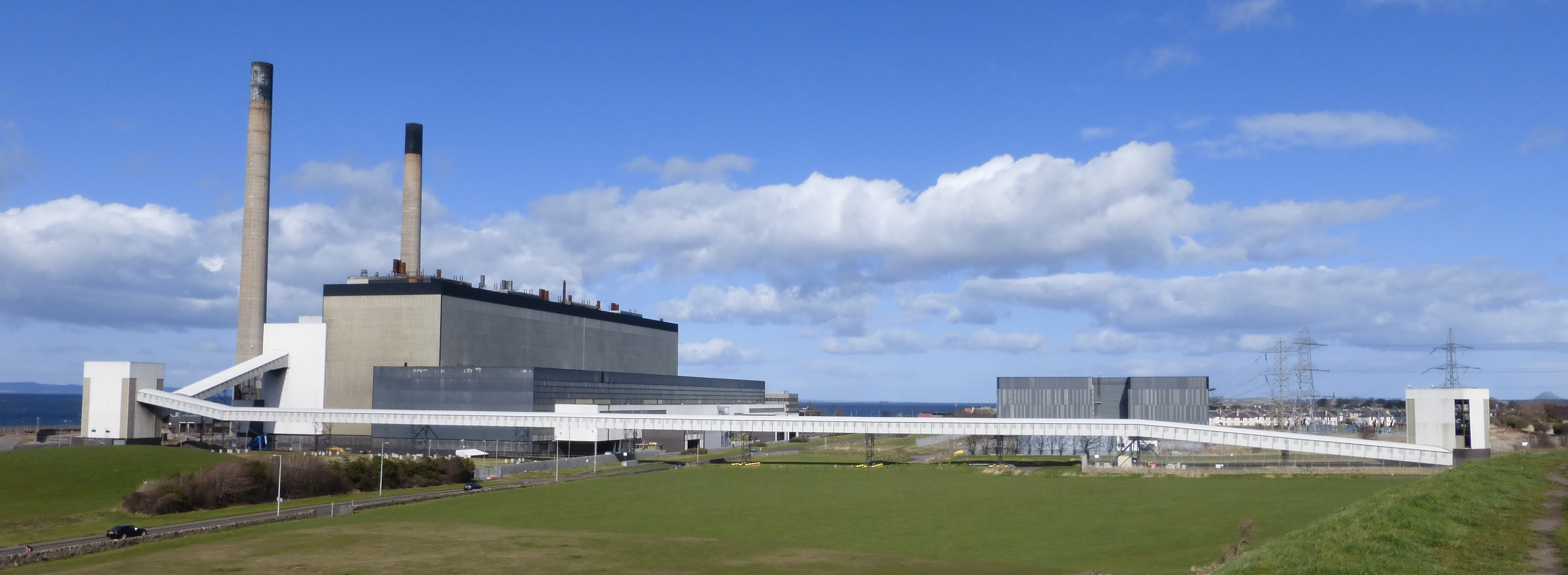
Cockenzie Power Station was the largest coal-fired power station in Great Britain when it opened in 1967.

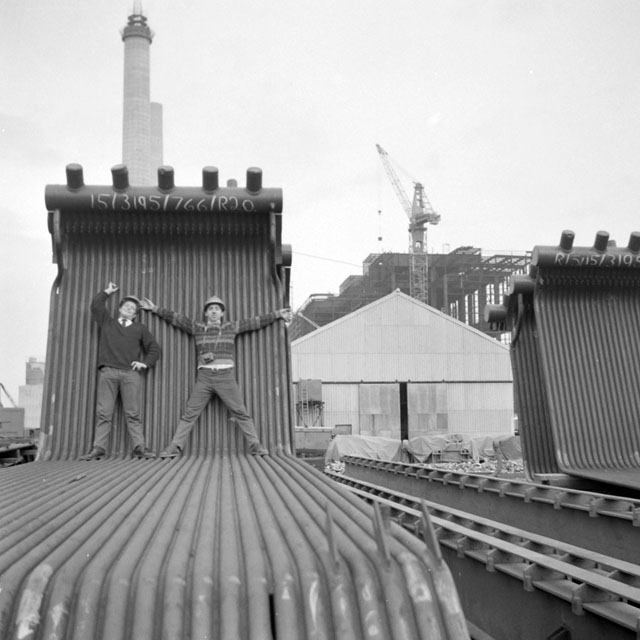
Cockenzie Power Station construction site (1965)

== Operations ==
=== Coal deliveries ===
Coal was originally supplied to the station directly from the deep mines of the neighbouring Midlothian Coalfield, but these have since been exhausted or closed. Subsequently coal was supplied from open cast mines in the Lothians, Fife, Ayrshire and Lanarkshire. Russian coal was used latterly as it has a low sulfur content which helped reduce sulfur oxide (SOx) emissions to the atmosphere. The power station was the first to use the "merry-go-round" system of coal deliveries by rail. This system uses hopper wagons which carry around 914 tonnes of coal per train. Coal was also delivered by lorries.

=== Coal handling plant ===
Coal was delivered to the station's coal plant, which has the capacity to hold up to 900,000 tonnes of coal on a storage bing. The coal plant and storage bing were situated on the opposite side of B1348 road between Prestonpans and Cockenzie and Port Seton, and the main station. The coal, known as 'raw coal' at this stage was weighed, sampled and screened for metal and stones before being transported to the main station and stored in bunkers. Coal was transported from the coal plant to storage bunkers in the main station by a conveyor belt.

=== Milling plant ===
There were six pulverising mills per unit which ground down the raw coal until it had the consistency of sand. The ground coal is called 'pulverised fuel' (PF). PF burns more efficiently than large lumps of coal, which reduces waste. The PF was then blown into the furnace along with preheated air by six large mechanical fans called Primary Air (PA) Fans. At full load each unit burned around 100 tonnes of coal per hour.

=== Draught plant ===
Each unit had two large Forced Draft (FD) Fans. For efficiency these fans drew warm air from an intake at the top of the station. This combustion air was passed through the Air Heater which increased its temperature. Dampers were used to control the quantity of air admitted to the furnace and direct some of the air to the Primary Air (PA) Fans. There were also two large Induced Draft (ID) Fans on each unit. These drew the hot gases from the Boiler, through the Air Heater where the heat is transferred to the incoming combustion air. The gases were then exhausted up the chimney. The exhaust flow of these fans was also controlled by dampers in the ducting. Working in tandem the Draught plant ensured the boiler was always under a slight vacuum. This created a draw of combustion air into the boiler and an exhaust to the chimney. The exhaust gases could not be allowed to cool below a certain temperature, as there was a risk of the sulfur and nitrogen oxides in the flue gases condensing and forming acids which could have damaged the ID Fans.

=== Water use ===
The water used in the station's boilers was taken from the local water supply, known as 'towns water'. This is the same as the drinking water used to supply households. This water was used as it had already been screened and purified by Scottish Water.

=== Demineralisation plant ===
The station's water treatment plant further demineralised the town’s water and removed any impurities. Although safe to drink water still contains dissolved silica (sand) and salt. Silica particles leave scale deposits on the boiler pipes which acts as an insulator, reducing heat transfer from the furnace to the water inside. This reduces the efficiency of the station and leads to increased running costs. Salt encourages rust which weakens the walls of the boiler pipes and can cause them to fracture and burst, known as a boiler tube leak. A serious tube leak can lead to reduced generation or loss of the unit until repairs are carried out.

Hydrazine was added and used as a reducing agent to remove excess oxygen from the water. Free oxygen atoms in the water also encourage rust to form inside the boiler pipes. Sodium hydroxide was also added to 'scour' the inside of the boiler tubes and remove any silica particles.

The demineralised water was then stored in large tanks inside the main station, ready to be used in the boilers.

=== Feedheating plant ===
Before the feedwater was introduced to the boiler it was heated up in stages. There were seven feedwater heaters on each unit which gradually increased the pressure and temperature of the water, until it reached a final feed temperature of around 210 °C. A steam driven Main Boiler Feed Pump (MBFP) pumped the water through the boiler Economiser and into the boiler Drum.

=== Boiler ===
The boilers were conventional water-tube boilers. The Boiler Drum was a high tensile steel pressure vessel where water and steam were separated. The water here was pressurised to 170 bar and heated further to 360 °C. On the bottom of each Drum were six large bore pipes known as Downcomers. These directed the water into the boiler water pipes where it was heated by the furnace. The water was then directed back into the Drum where it flashed off into saturated steam. The steam was then further heated by passing through Primary and Secondary Superheaters until it reached 565 °C. The superheated steam was then piped to the high-pressure turbine, back to the boiler for reheat, and then back to the intermediate and low-pressure turbines in series.

=== Turbine ===
There was one turbine and one alternator per unit. Each turbine had a High Pressure (HP) stage, an Intermediate Pressure (IP) stage and two Low Pressure (LP) stages all connected in tandem to the same shaft. The superheated steam entered the HP turbine at a temperature of 566 °C and a pressure of 162 bar. The exhaust steam from the HP turbine travelled back through the boiler Reheater and entered the IP turbine at the same temperature but at a lower pressure of 43.5 bar. The exhaust steam from the IP turbine then entered the LP turbines. The steam was used to drive the turbines, causing the shaft to rotate at 3,000 rpm. This speed drove the alternator and gave a frequency of 50 cycles per second (Hz) and allowed connection to the National Grid. Electricity was generated at 17 kilovolts (kV).

=== Condenser ===
After use, the steam was condensed back into water, by passing it through the condenser. Seawater from the Firth of Forth was used as a cooling medium. Over 500,000 litres per minute of water were used for cooling. The seawater was then discharged back into the Firth of Forth. Controls ensured the discharged seawater was kept close to the temperature of the sea, to avoid creating a 'tropical' environment and upsetting the local ecosystem.

=== Ash removal and use ===
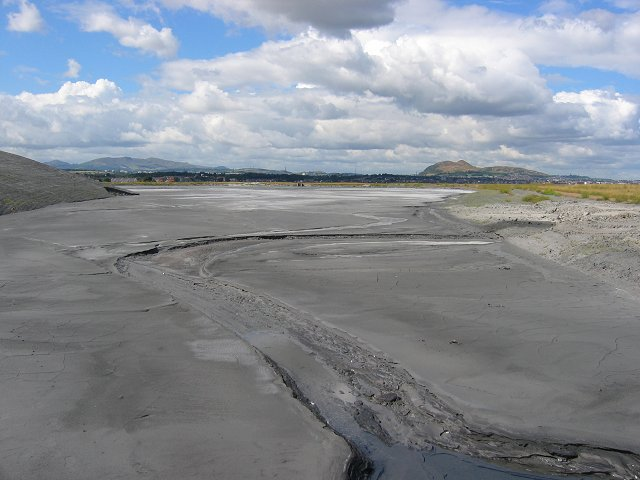
The ash dump at Musselburgh

The burning of coal in power stations generates ash and dust. The station's electrostatic precipitators captured fly ash from the flue gases, preventing it from entering the atmosphere. Bottom ash was also produced by the station. Ash from the station was sold through the ScotAsh company, a joint venture between Scottish Power and Blue Circle. It was used in the construction industry and in products such as grout and cement. Any remaining ash was piped to the large lagoons in the nearby town of Musselburgh, where it was capped and planted, and used as a nature reserve.

=== Electricity distribution ===
The electricity was initially generated at 17 kV. This was stepped up via a transformer to 275 kV for distribution on the National Grid. The electricity was distributed to Scotland, and England too, which it is connected to via a double circuit overhead line, operating at 275 kV and 400 kV, to Stella near Newcastle upon Tyne.

== Post-privatisation and future ==
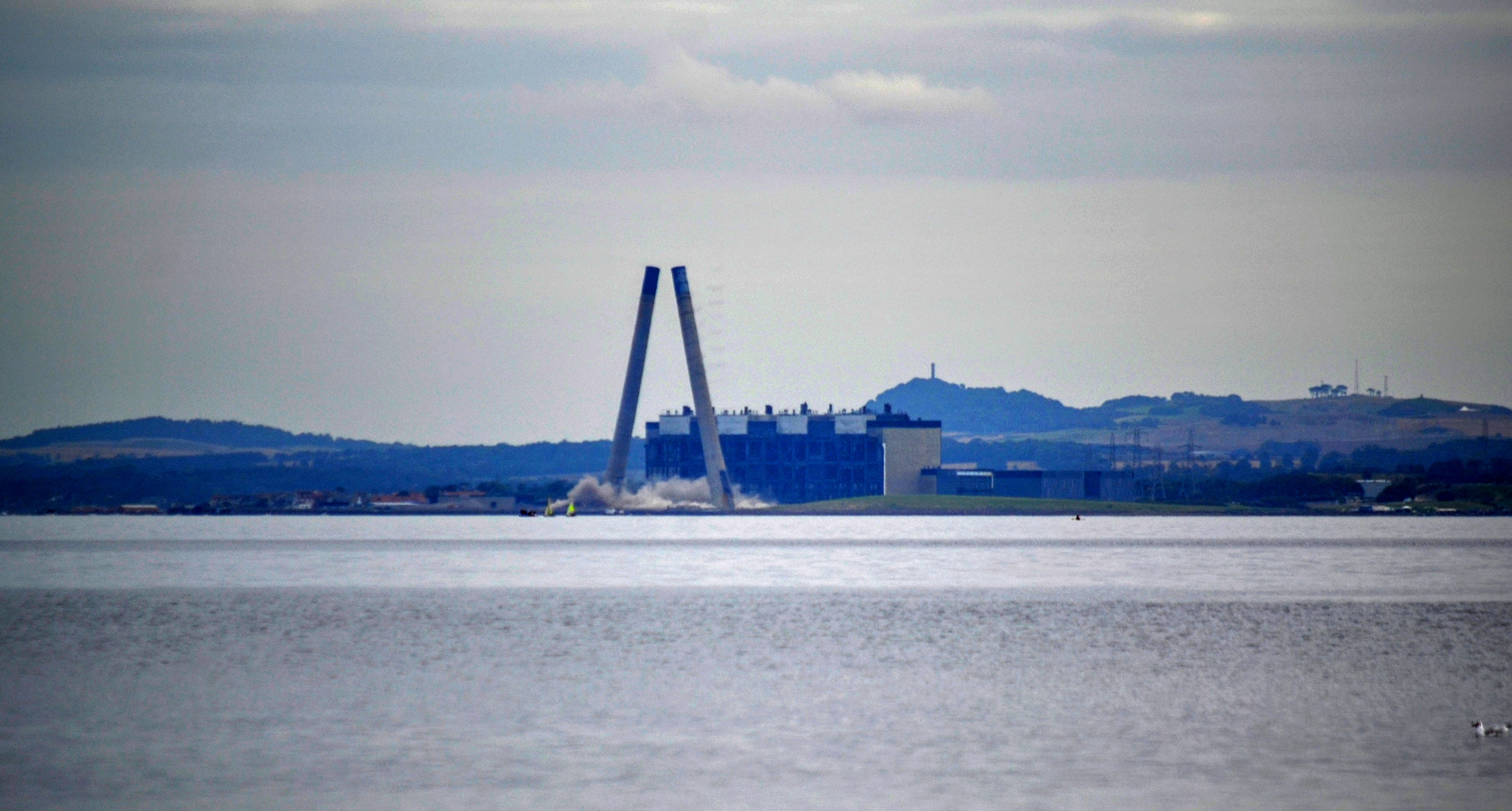
Demolition of chimneys in 2015

From 1991 to 2013, the station was operated by the privatised Scottish Power utility group. It surpassed its originally intended lifespan. It was run as a 'marginal station', guaranteeing seasonal and peak supply and covering non-availability of other power stations. For this reason considerable investment was made to improve start-up times to maximise generating opportunities in the deregulated electricity generation market. This upgrading was in the form of an operating system that used gas, oil and finally coal in a three-stage modified burner control system developed by Eurotherm Controls. From 2001, the station exported electricity to Northern Ireland via an undersea power link.

=== CCGT replacement ===
The coal-fired power station was forced to close due to the Large Combustion Plant Directive (LCPD). This was an EU directive that aims to reduce acidification, ground level ozone and particulates by controlling the emissions of sulfur dioxide, oxides of nitrogen and dust from large combustion plants. To reduce emissions a Boosted Over Fire Air plant was fitted to reduce the concentration of oxides of nitrogen in the flue gas. The station closed on 15 March 2013, earlier than expected.

Scottish Power had considered construction of a combined cycle gas turbine (CCGT) power station on the site. Natural gas is a much more efficient fuel than coal and would have created less than half the carbon and nitrogen dioxide emissions compared to the old power station. If the new station had been built, it would have required a 17 km (11 mi) gas pipeline from East Fortune, to supply it with fuel.

In 2011 planning permission to replace the coal-fired power station was approved by the Scottish Government. The new 1,000 megawatt (MW) CCGT power station would have created up to 1,000 jobs in demolition and construction and 50 full-time positions when completed. The approval was in line with the recommendations of the report of the public inquiry. Conditions imposed on the consent were made to minimise disturbance in the area during construction. These conditions would have also lessened impacts on the environment and protected species. The development would have been carbon capture ready and would have required full carbon capture and storage technology if it was commercially and technically proven. A separate application for a 17 km (11 mi) pipeline from the existing gas network at East Fortune to the new power station was also approved.

=== Cruise ship terminal ===
In the 1990s, leading maritime expert Professor Alf Baird was hired by ScottishPower to investigate the case for a £30 million marine terminal to replace Cockenzie Power Station that would bring the world’s biggest cruise ship companies to the East Lothian community. Cockenzie was said to be the "optimal" site for a port because it has little tidal movement, strong rail links and room for expansion. While ships can already dock at Leith, Rosyth and Hound Point, these locations are thought to lack the necessary infrastructure to cater for large cruise liners. As of 19 June 2013, Scottish Power was considering the cruise project.

In May 2015 Cockenzie Development Company Ltd (CDC) proposed a significant development for the power station site. Based around the hub of the first purpose built cruise terminal on mainland Scotland, the development could expand to incorporate a cruise terminal, retail centre, visitor centre, eco village and industrial/business park. CDC expect the facility to attract around 200 ships per annum, bringing in around 500,000 visitors a year to Scotland, to create around 2,000 jobs directly, with others created indirectly, and to boost demand for Scottish products. Visitors are expected to generate £100m for the Scottish economy. The servicing of the cruise ships could generate a further £10m spend on local skills and produce. The scheme was still under discussion in 2019.

The substation for the Phase 1A extension to the Seagreen Offshore Wind Farm will be located on the site.
