= Levenmouth Offshore Wind Demonstrator Turbine =

Methil Offshore Wind Farm
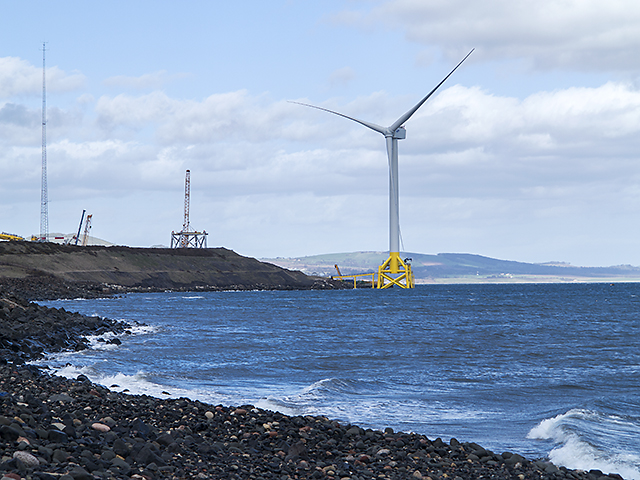
- Samsung's wind turbine at Methil
- Country: Scotland, United Kingdom
- Location: Fife
- Coordinates: 56°09′46″N 03°00′32″W
- Status: Under construction
- Operators: Samsung, 2-B Energy

Wind farm
- Type: Offshore

Power generation
- Units operational: 1 × 7 MW
- Nameplate capacity: 7 MW

Methil Offshore Wind Turbine (alternatively Levenmouth Demonstration Turbine) is a demonstrator site for experimental offshore wind turbines at Fife Energy Park off the coast of Methil, Fife in Scotland.

== Planning ==
The initial plan (in 2011) was for test turbines to be operated by Dutch firm 2-B Energy. Permission was given to construct one or two turbines in a test of high-capacity offshore wind turbines. The first turbine would have been 179 metres (587 ft) high with only two blades.

In January 2012 it was announced that Samsung would be the first company to build a demonstrator turbine on the site. In April 2012 the Scottish government announced that it had also signed a deal with 2-B Energy to develop two-bladed offshore wind turbines nearby. In July 2015, the Offshore Renewable Energy Catapult announced that it was in discussions with Samsung to acquire its 7MW demonstration turbine for research purposes. This was successful and ORE Catapult now owns and operates the turbine as a demonstration site.

== Samsung ==
Construction of Samsung's 7 megawatt wind turbine was completed in October 2013. The turbine is located just 50 metres from the coast, and at the time of construction was the world's largest and most powerful offshore wind turbine. The tower stands to a maximum height of 110 metres, and 195 metres to blade tip. The rotor has three blades and spans 171 metres. Samsung has invested £70 million in the demonstrator project, which could run for up to five years.

== 2-B Energy ==
2-B Energy secured a £26.5 million investment package for their project in March 2014. 2-B Energy will establish two full-scale test units at the site. The company is developing a 140-metre wide two-bladed turbine with full helicopter landing access. The two 6MW turbines will be located approximately 1.5 km offshore. They will stand at a maximum height of 109 metres above lowest tide, and 186 metres to blade tip. 2-B Energy hopes to have planning consent by 2015, with the turbines being installed in 2016.

== See also ==
- Wind power in Scotland
- List of offshore wind farms
