= Erebus Offshore Wind Farm =

Proposed floating offshore wind project in Celtic Sea near Wales

Erebus
- Country: Wales, United Kingdom
- Location: Celtic Sea,
- Coordinates: 51.494°N 5.583°W
- Status: Proposed
- Commission date: Expected 2030

Wind farm
- Type: Offshore

Power generation
- Nameplate capacity: 100 MW (proposed)

External links
- Website: https://www.bluegemwind.com/our-projects/erebus/

Erebus is a proposed Offshore Wind Farm located in the Celtic Sea off the Pembrokeshire coast. The project is being developed by Blue Gem Wind, co-owned by French energy company TotalEnergies in a joint-venture with Simply Blue Group. It will be approximately 45 km (28 mi; 24 nmi) from the coast, south-west of Milford Haven, with a subsea cable connecting to Milford Haven. If built, it will be the first floating wind farm located off the coast of Wales, which has been described as a "pathway project", and it is hoped it can reinforce the prospects of ports and engineering firms in south Wales.

The project is named after HMS Erebus, built in Pembroke Dockyard in 1826, which in turn was the second Royal Navy vessel to be named after the dark area of Hades in Greek mythology, Erebus.

In August 2020, the project was granted a seabed lease from The Crown Estate, as part of the Offshore Wind Test and Demonstration opportunity. This was the first floating wind project to gain a lease in Wales.

In March 2023, the project consisting of seven 14 MW turbines was granted consent by the Welsh Government. At that point, it was hoped it would be operational by 2026. However, by September 2023, the project had been delayed as the funding available through the Contracts for Difference scheme was too low, so Blue Gem Wind did not submit a bid. There were no successful offshore wind projects in that auction round.

In January 2026, the project was awarded Contracts for Difference for 100 MW at £216.49/MWh (2024 prices), as part of the seventh Allocation Round.

While the turbine manufacturer had not been decided, as of January 2026, the project will use Principle Power's Windfloat foundations.

== See also ==
- List of offshore wind farms in the United Kingdom
- Renewable energy in the United Kingdom
- Renewable energy in Wales
