= ScottishPower =

Scottish energy company

Scottish Power Limited
- Logo used since 2023. It is based on the Iberdrola logo.

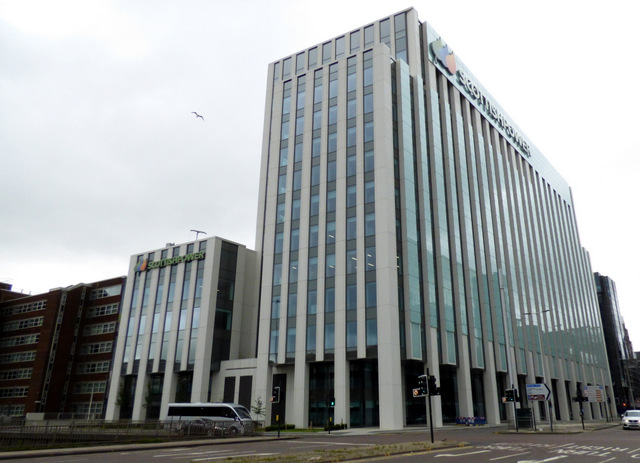
- Headquarters on St Vincent Street, Glasgow
- Formerly: New Scottish Power plc (29–30 July 1999); Scottish Power plc (1999–2007)
- Type: Subsidiary
- Traded as: LSE: SP
- Industry: Electricity generation, transmission, distribution, retailing
- Founded: 1990
- Headquarters: Glasgow, Scotland, UK
- Key people: Keith Anderson, CEO
- Products: Electricity and natural gas
- Revenue: ▲£5,349.7 million (2020)
- Net income: ▼£78 million (2020)
- Number of employees: 5,500 (2020)
- Parent: Iberdrola
- Website: scottishpower.com

Scottish Power Limited, trading as ScottishPower, is a British vertically integrated energy company headquartered in Glasgow, Scotland. It is a subsidiary of Spanish utility firm Iberdrola.

ScottishPower is the distribution network operator for Central and Southern Scotland, Merseyside, North Wales and parts of Cheshire and Shropshire. It is also the transmission owner for the south of Scotland. The company also supplies electricity and gas to homes and businesses around the United Kingdom and generates power for supply to the grid. It owned PPM Energy in the United States, which has now been folded into Avangrid.

== History ==
=== Foundation ===
Original ScottishPower logo

ScottishPower was formed in 1990, in preparation for the privatisation of the previously state-owned Scottish electricity industry the following year. Previously the UK government had privatised the English and Welsh electricity industry by splitting the market into 12 regional electricity companies (RECs) and two power generators. However, in Scotland, the industry was already organised on an integrated generation, distribution, and supply basis, and this integration survived the privatisation to become a model for the rest of the United Kingdom. ScottishPower was largely formed from the bigger of the two Scottish electricity boards, the South of Scotland Electricity Board, whilst the smaller, the North of Scotland Hydro Board, eventually became part of the Scottish & Southern Energy Group (the nuclear power stations in Scotland were spun off into a third company, Scottish Nuclear, which was not sold off with ScottishPower and Scottish Hydro Electric, but was sold later as part of British Energy).

=== MANWEB and Southern Water ===
ScottishPower was the larger of the two Scottish energy companies and benefited from being both a generator and supplier of power. In 1995 it acquired the regional electricity company MANWEB, which supplied Merseyside, North Wales and parts of Cheshire. In 1996 the company diversified into the water supply business with the purchase of Southern Water (which was sold again in 2002).

When the supply of energy into British homes was opened up to competition, ScottishPower entered this market, taking market share from the previous gas supply monopoly British Gas and also gaining new market share in England and Wales.

=== Scottish Telecom ===
ScottishPower established the telecommunications company, Thus (originally known as Scottish Telecom) and then floated it on the London Stock Exchange in 2002.

=== PacifiCorp ===
In 2000, ScottishPower completed the acquisition of PacifiCorp, which supplies electricity in the western United States, which operates as Pacific Power (in the regulated energy industries of the states of Oregon, Washington, California), and as Rocky Mountain Power (in the regulated energy industries of the states of Idaho and Utah as well as both and central and eastern Wyoming (former Pacific Power territory), and southwestern Wyoming). In May 2005, ScottishPower announced that it had agreed to sell Pacificorp to MidAmerican Energy Holdings Company, a company controlled by Warren Buffett's company, Berkshire Hathaway, for US$5.1 billion in cash and US$4.3 billion in debt and preferred stock. The successful completion of the deal was announced on 21 March 2006, after securing regulatory approvals. The deal did not include PPM Energy (which, as Pacificorp Power Marketing, was formerly the non-regulated subsidiary of Pacificorp).

=== Takeover bids ===
Following the announcement of its acquisition of PacifiCorp, the group's share price rose but the company was now widely seen as vulnerable to a takeover. It was soon revealed that the German energy group E.ON, which also owns Powergen, was interested in a takeover. On 22 November 2005, the board rejected an offer from E.ON of 570 pence per share, which would have valued the group at £10.7 billion.

On 28 November 2006, the board of directors of ScottishPower agreed to an £11.6 billion takeover bid by the Spanish energy firm Iberdrola. The offer was formally approved by shareholders at an EGM on 30 March 2007, effectively creating Europe's third largest utility company.

=== Recent history ===
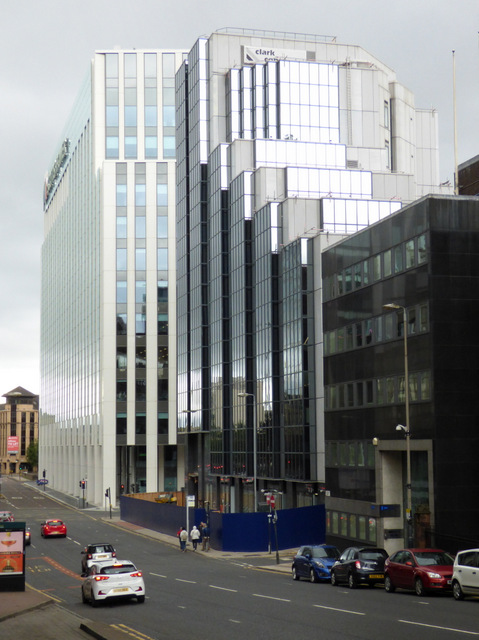
New HQ building on St Vincent Street in Glasgow

On 24 November 2018, the British government's energy regulator, the Office of Gas and Electricity Markets (Ofgem), appointed ScottishPower as Supplier of Last Resort for the failed domestic and business supplier Extra Energy. ScottishPower acquired all of Extra Energy's 108,000 domestic customers and 21,000 business customers.

On Friday 9 October 2020, Ofgem appointed ScottishPower as Supplier of Last Resort for the failed domestic supplier Tonik Energy. Scottish Power acquired all of Tonik Energy's 130,000 customers.

On Friday 5 December 2020, Ofgem appointed ScottishPower as Supplier of Last Resort for the failed domestic supplier Yorkshire Energy (also known as Daisy Energy). ScottishPower acquired all 74,000 domestic customers and a small number of non-domestic customers.

== Controversies and complaints ==
In April 2007, the energy regulator Ofgem urged customers of ScottishPower and EDF Energy to switch to a cheaper provider after the firms refused to cut prices in line with the rest of the industry.

In April 2008, Ofgem launched an investigation into allegations that ScottishPower abused their dominant market position relating to the electricity transmission network they own jointly in Scotland. Ofgem said it had launched its inquiry into Scottish Power and SSE under section 18 of the Competition Act, "based on a formal complaint alleging abuse of a dominant position in the electricity generation sector arising from constrained capacity on the transmission network." The energy regulator believes that energy generators manipulate the power market for profit when supplies are tight because network operator National Grid has to pay utilities to turn their plants on or off to balance supply and demand. This resulted in companies deliberately shutting their plants down when supplies are tight in order to receive a higher payment to start up again, increasing the system balancing costs at the expense of consumers. Ofgem was alarmed that the cost of balancing the system increased from £70 million in 2007/08 to an estimated £238 million for 2008/09 and an expected £258 million in 2009/10, with most of the costs incurred in Scotland. In January 2009, Ofgem suspended the investigation, saying it would be more effective to deal with the wider problem than pursuing the specific case further.

In November 2012, the Information Commissioner's Office (ICO) publicly listed ScottishPower as one of a number of companies that it had concerns about due to unsolicited telephone calls for marketing. The concerns were based on complaints. In response, ScottishPower said that it was working with the ICO to address any issues.

In early 2015, ScottishPower was temporarily banned from signing up new customers, due to long-standing and serious concerns regarding poor customer service, overdue bills and failure to implement rulings made by the Energy Ombudsman. The company's failings continued to be highlighted in the press later in the year, with complaints levels 20 times those of their best-performing competitor.

In April 2016, ScottishPower released a press release that an £18M agreement had been reached with Ofgem following their investigation into customer service standards.

In 2017, ScottishPower created controversy when they pursued a couple for a £4,300 debt despite the couple not owing ScottishPower any money and, moreover, not being customers of the firm. ScottishPower ignored letters from the couple, instead sending bailiffs to the home of the couple. It later transpired that the couple were in no debt to ScottishPower.

In 2020, The Observer gave ScottishPower an award for the year's "worst customer service" for "its singular pursuit of revenue", including sending bills, debt collectors' letters and the threat of bailiffs to people who did not use its services, then refusing to register their complaints.

In January 2021, the Consumers' Association magazine Which? ranked ScottishPower the worst-performing supplier for customer service and the second worst supplier overall in their annual review of energy suppliers. This was repeated in 2026 (both as worst for customer service and second worst supplier overall), only this year adding "complaints performance" and "overall customer score" to the list of worst-performing attributes.

== Operations ==
=== Energy Retail ===
The Energy Retail division contains ScottishPower Energy Retail Ltd which holds the gas and electricity supply licences.

In early 2025, this division held an 8% share of the domestic electricity supply market and 7% share of the domestic gas supply market. Ofgem's data show that Scottish Power's share of the energy retail market has been in decline for several years.

Also included in this division is SP Dataserve Ltd which provides a range of metering services including data collection, analysis and revenue protection.

=== Energy Networks ===
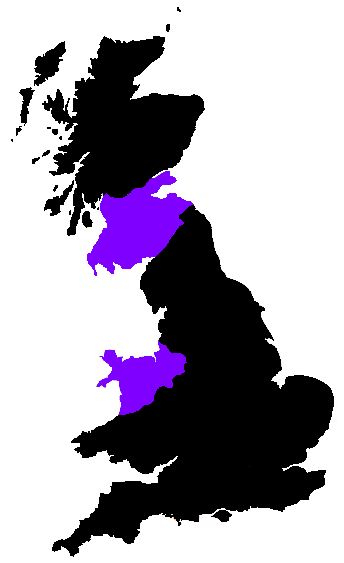
ScottishPower electricity distribution areas

The Energy Networks business contains three asset owning companies SP Transmission Ltd – holds the transmission licence for central and southern Scotland and owns the part of the Moyle Interconnector with Northern Ireland Electricity, SP Distribution Ltd – holds the distribution licence for central and southern Scotland and SP Manweb Plc – holds the distribution licence for North Wales, Merseyside, and Cheshire. A fourth asset management business SP Power Systems Ltd maintains and repairs the distribution networks on behalf of the owners and acts as the distribution network operator. The operation of the transmission grid is carried out by the state-owned National Energy System Operator.

=== Energy Wholesale ===
Energy Wholesale contained two companies, ScottishPower Generation Ltd, which formerly generated 6,200 MW of electricity power in the United Kingdom using coal-fired thermal power stations, combined cycle power stations, hydro-electric schemes, pumped storage generation and were acquired by Drax in 2018. In 2006, ScottishPower Renewables (SPR) was granted permission to build Europe's largest on-shore windfarm. The 322 MW / 140 turbine site cost an estimated £300m and covers approximately 55 km^{2} (21 sq mi) of moorland south of Glasgow. By 2014, SPR had a portfolio of over 1,250 MW of operating windfarms, including the recently expanded Whitelee with a total generation capacity of 539 MW, making it Europe's largest windfarm. Also within this division is ScottishPower Energy Management Ltd which is responsible for buying and selling wholesale energy.

In 2005, the WWF named ScottishPower's Cockenzie power station as the UK's least carbon-efficient power station. It is now closed.

In 2007, the WWF named ScottishPower's Longannet power station as the UK's least carbon-efficient power station out of Europe's top 30 worst polluting power stations in absolute terms. It ceased operation in 2016.

ScottishPower generation portfolio
Station name	Generation capacity	Installation	Fuel
Whitelee Wind Farm	322 MW	140 Siemens wind turbines	Wind
Black Law Wind Farm	124 MW	54 Siemens wind turbines	Wind

=== PPM Energy ===
PPM Energy Inc was previously the competitive arm of Pacificorp but was made a separate business in 2002. It was involved in renewable energy and gas storage, amongst other things, in the US. It is now part of Avangrid Renewables.

== See also ==
- Energy policy of Scotland
- Energy use and conservation in the United Kingdom
- Green electricity in the United Kingdom
