= Neart na Gaoithe =

Offshore wind farm in Scotland

- Country: Scotland
- Location: Firth of Forth
- Coordinates: 56°16′30″N 02°14′42″W
- Status: Commissioned
- Construction began: 13 August 2020
- Owners: EDF Renewables; ESB Group

Wind farm
- Type: Offshore
- Distance from shore: 20 km (12 mi)
- Rotor diameter: 167 m (548 ft)

Power generation
- Units under const.: 54 × 8 MW
- Nameplate capacity: 450 MW

External links
- Website: nngoffshorewind.com

Wind farm layout

Neart na Gaoithe ("strength of the wind" in Gaelic, pronounced [ˈɲarʃd nə gɤ.jə]) is an offshore wind farm in the outer Firth of Forth, Scotland, UK. It is 15.5 kilometres (9.6 mi) east of Fife Ness, with a generating capacity of 450 MW. It was developed by EDF Renewables and ESB. Offshore work began in 2020, with completion originally planned for 2023 but delayed due to supply chain challenges, the Covid pandemic and "construction woes" until summer 2025.

The windfarm, also known as just NnG, became fully operational in July 2025, with an expected operational lifetime of 25 years. It is managed from an operations base in Eyemouth that employs 50 people.

== Planning ==
Mainstream Renewable Power was awarded exclusive rights to develop the wind farm in February 2009. They proposed using 125 3.6MW turbines or 75 6MW turbines to achieve a total capacity of between 420 and 450 megawatts. In 2011, surveyors conducting a detailed preparatory survey of the sea floor published sonar images of the wrecks of the two submarines – K-4 and K-17 – sunk during the Battle of May Island in 1918.

A planning application was submitted in July 2012. The developers said that the wind farm would occupy an area of around 65 square miles, would require between 64 and 125 turbines, and would have a rated capacity of 450MW. The estimated cost was £1.4 billion.

In February 2014 they confirmed that they would be using 75 Siemens SWT-6.0-154 turbines each with a 6 megawatt capacity. A UK government contract was awarded in February 2015. Construction was expected to begin in 2015, but in January 2015 the RSPB submitted a legal challenge citing concerns over the impact on seabirds. The case was heard at the Court of Session in Edinburgh in May 2015. In May 2017 the same court overturned a July 2016 block of the project. An RSPB appeal was denied in July 2017.

The project was acquired in May 2018 by EDF and was originally expected to be commissioned in 2023. In December 2018, permission was received from the Scottish government to reduce the number of turbines to 54 while maintaining the same overall capacity. Construction began in August 2020. The wind farm was expected to be operational by 2023 but due to supply chain challenges EDF announced in 2022 that completion would be delayed to summer 2024. The date was later moved to 2025.

== Construction ==
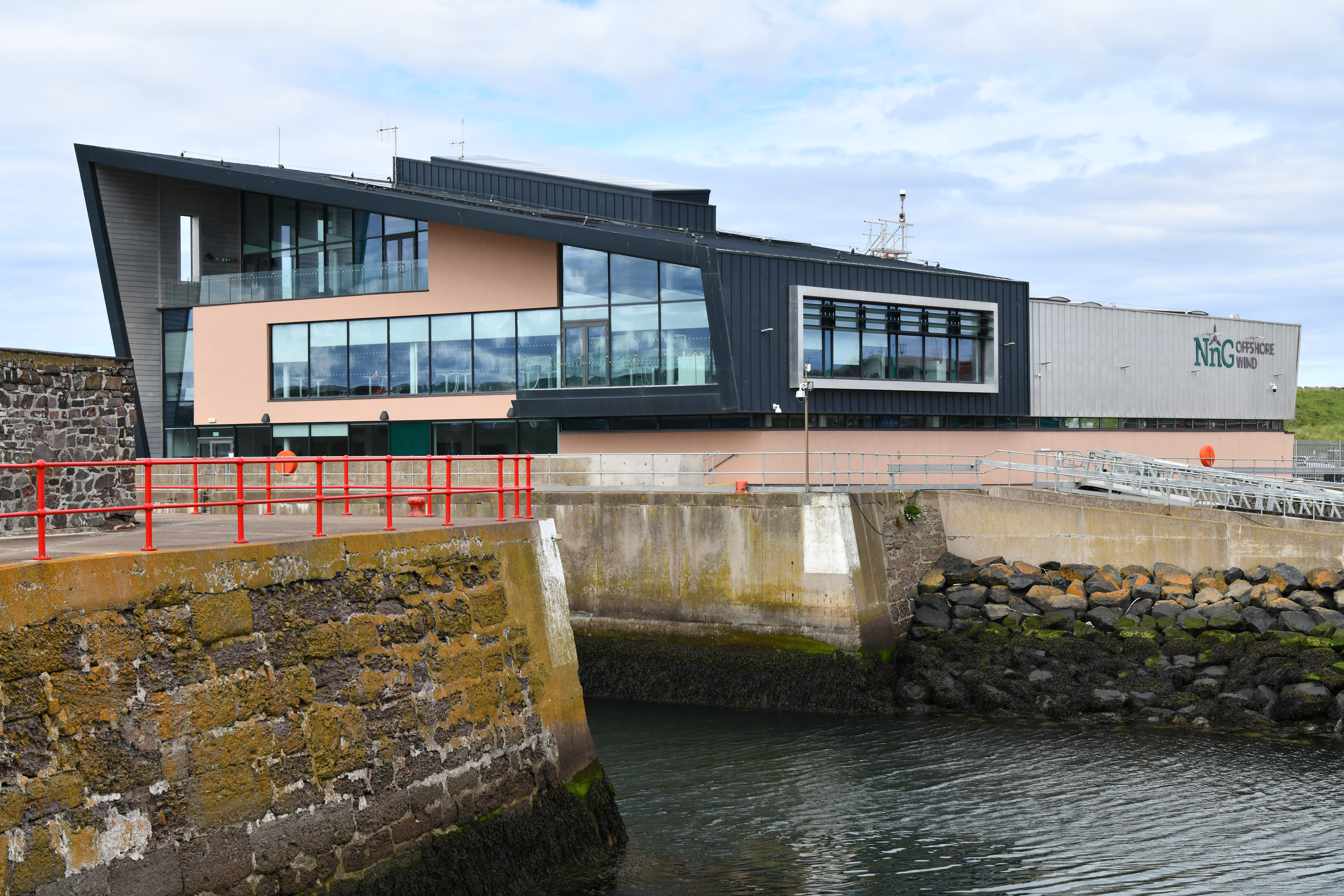
Operations base, Eyemouth Harbour

Work on the offshore elements of the wind farm began in August 2020. Two 37 km long high-voltage export cables will bring the electricity back to the landfall at Thorntonloch Beach, near Bilsdean on the coast of East Lothian. The shore-side ends of the cables were winched through 650m long horizontal drill ducts under the beach to join with the onshore cable. The offshore cables were then laid across the sea-bed by the installation vessel 'Cable Enterprise', before being buried under the seabed by remotely-operated submarine. The first of the cables was laid out to its offshore substation by 18 June 2021, with the second expected during July 2021. Work continued in September 2021 when two shunt reactors were delivered to the Lammermuir Hills site by Collett Transport. Originating overseas, the shunt reactors travelled over 5000 miles to the Port of Leith in Scotland before onward transport to the substation site.

In January 2022 two 180-tonne super grid transformers were delivered to the onshore substation. The first substation installation completed on 8 June 2022.

In January 2023, the operations and maintenance base in Eyemouth was opened.

The first turbine installation was completed in July 2023, and in October 2024, the first turbines started to generate power. The final turbine was installed in April 2025.

In July 2025, the scheme became fully operational, with Scottish First Minister John Swinney visited the operations base in Eyemouth to mark the occasion. Construction of the scheme was estimated to contribute around £200 million to the economy.

Panorama showing all 54 turbines on the horizon. Seen from Dundee Law at a distance of c. 31 miles / 50 km, with Tayport and Tentsmuir Forest in the foregound.

== See also ==
- Wind power in Scotland
- List of offshore wind farms
