= Offshore wind power in the United Kingdom =

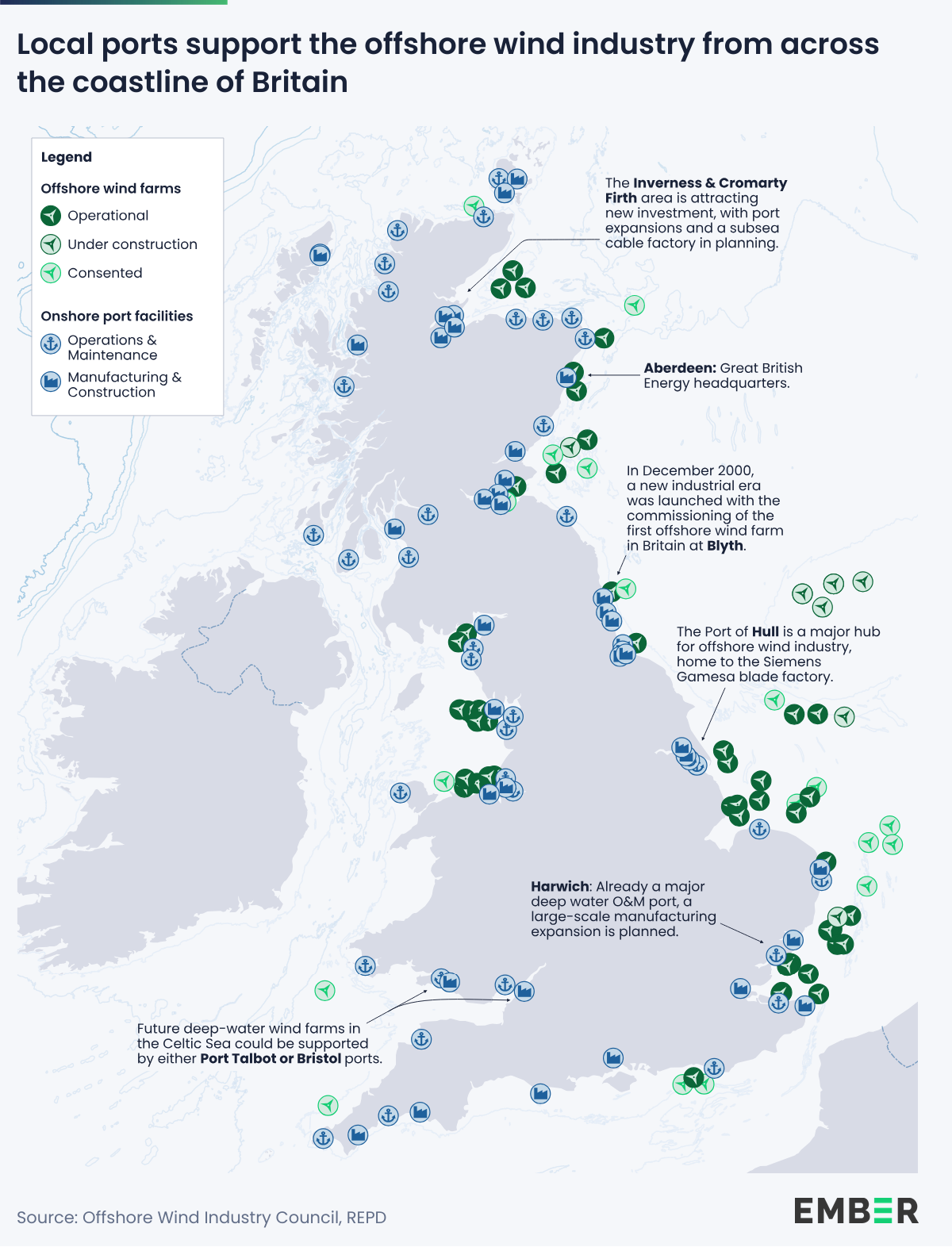
Offshore wind farms and onshore port facilities which support the offshore wind industry in Britain (2025)

The United Kingdom became the world leader of offshore wind power generation in October 2008 when it overtook Denmark. It held this lead until 2021 when overtaken by China.

Government direction in the development of offshore wind power advanced in 2016 with the development of strategies and systems.

The total offshore wind power capacity installed in the United Kingdom at the start of 2022 was 11.3 GW. By 2023, the United Kingdom had over 11,000 wind turbines with a total installed capacity of 30 gigawatts (GW): 15 GW onshore and 15 GW offshore,

The UK has set a target to have 50GW of offshore wind capacity by 2030.

== History ==
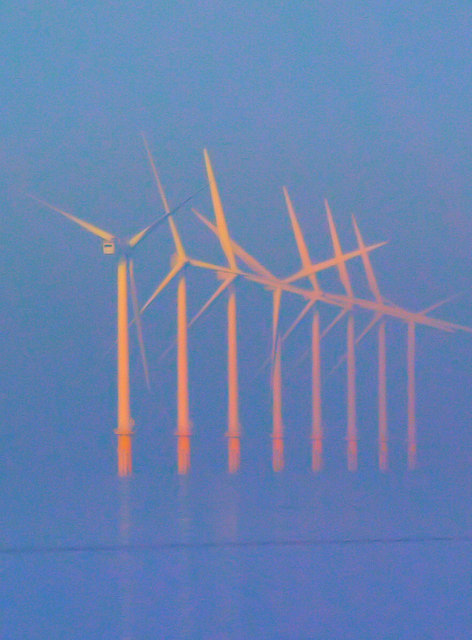
Burbo Bank Offshore Wind Farm.

The United Kingdom has been estimated to have over a third of Europe's total offshore wind resource, which is equivalent to three times the electricity needs of the nation at current rates of electricity consumption (In 2010 peak winter demand was 59.3 GW, in summer it drops to about 45 GW).

One estimate calculates that wind turbines in one third of United Kingdom waters shallower than 25 metres (82 ft) would, on average, generate 40 GW; turbines in one third of the waters between 25 metres (82 ft) and 50 metres (164 ft) depth would on average generate a further 80 GW, i.e. 120 GW in total. An estimate of the theoretical maximum potential of the United Kingdom's offshore wind resource in all waters to 700 metres (2,300 ft) depth gives the average power as 2200 GW.

The first developments in United Kingdom offshore wind power came about through the now discontinued Non-Fossil Fuel Obligation (NFFO), leading to two wind farms, Blyth Offshore and Gunfleet sands. The NFFO was introduced as part of the Electricity Act 1989 and obliged United Kingdom electricity supply companies to secure specified amounts of electricity from non-fossil sources, which provided the initial spur for the commercial development of renewable energy in the United Kingdom.

Offshore wind projects completed in 2010–2011 had a levelised cost of electricity of £136/MWh, which fell to £131/MWh for projects completed in 2012–14 and £121/MWh for projects approved in 2012–2014; the industry hopes to get the cost down to £100/MWh for projects approved in 2020.

The construction price for offshore windfarms has fallen by almost a third since 2012 while technology improved and developers think a new generation of even larger turbines will enable yet more future cost reductions. In 2017 the UK built 53% of the 3.15 GW European offshore wind farm capacity. In 2020, Boris Johnson pledged that, by the end of the decade, offshore wind would generate enough energy to power every UK home.

In 2013, the 175-turbine London Array wind farm, located off the Kent coast, became the largest offshore wind farm in the world; this was surpassed in 2018 by the Walney 3 Extension.

In 2013 the Offshore Energy Strategic Environmental Assessment (SEA) was first published and has been updated regularly. It is the guiding document from the UK government on offshore energy.

In 2016 the government created the Low Carbon Contracts Company as the party low carbon developers will contract with in the Contracts for Difference (CfD) scheme, the developers having won bids in government auctions. The developers would be paid a flat, index linked rate, for electricity for 15 years. Each contract would have a strike price being the price for electricity reflecting the cost of investing in that specific technology with the developer paid the difference between the strike price and the average market price for electricity.

At the start of 2022 there was a total of 11.26 GW of installed offshore wind capacity. During 2022 an additional 3.2 GW of capacity was added with the commissioning of the Moray East, Triton Knoll and Hornsea Project Two wind farms. A further 13.6 GW of capacity is either under construction (Neart Na Gaoithe, Sofia, Seagreen & Doggerbank A) or has been awarded a Contract for Difference in Round 3 or Round 4.

== Offshore wind bidding rounds ==
In 1998, the British Wind Energy Association (now RenewableUK) began discussions with the government to draw up formal procedures for negotiating with the Crown Estate, the owner of almost all the United Kingdom coastline out to a distance of 12 nautical miles (22.2 km), to build offshore wind farms. The result was a set of guidelines published in 1999, to build "development" farms designed to give developers a chance to gain technical and environmental experience. The projects were limited to 10 km^{2} (3.9 square miles) in size and with a maximum of 30 turbines. Locations were chosen by potential developers and a large number of applications were submitted.

Seventeen of the applications were granted permission to proceed in April 2001, in what has become known as Round 1 of United Kingdom offshore wind development.

In 2020, the Boris Johnson-led government decided to permit onshore wind power, and since December 2021 onshore wind developers have been able to compete in subsidy auctions with solar power and offshore wind.

=== Round 1 ===
The first of the Round 1 projects was North Hoyle Wind Farm, completed in December 2003. The final project, Teesside, was completed in August 2013. Twelve Round 1 farms in total are in operation providing a maximum power generating capacity of 1.2 GW. Five sites were withdrawn, including the Shell Flat site off the coast of Lancashire.

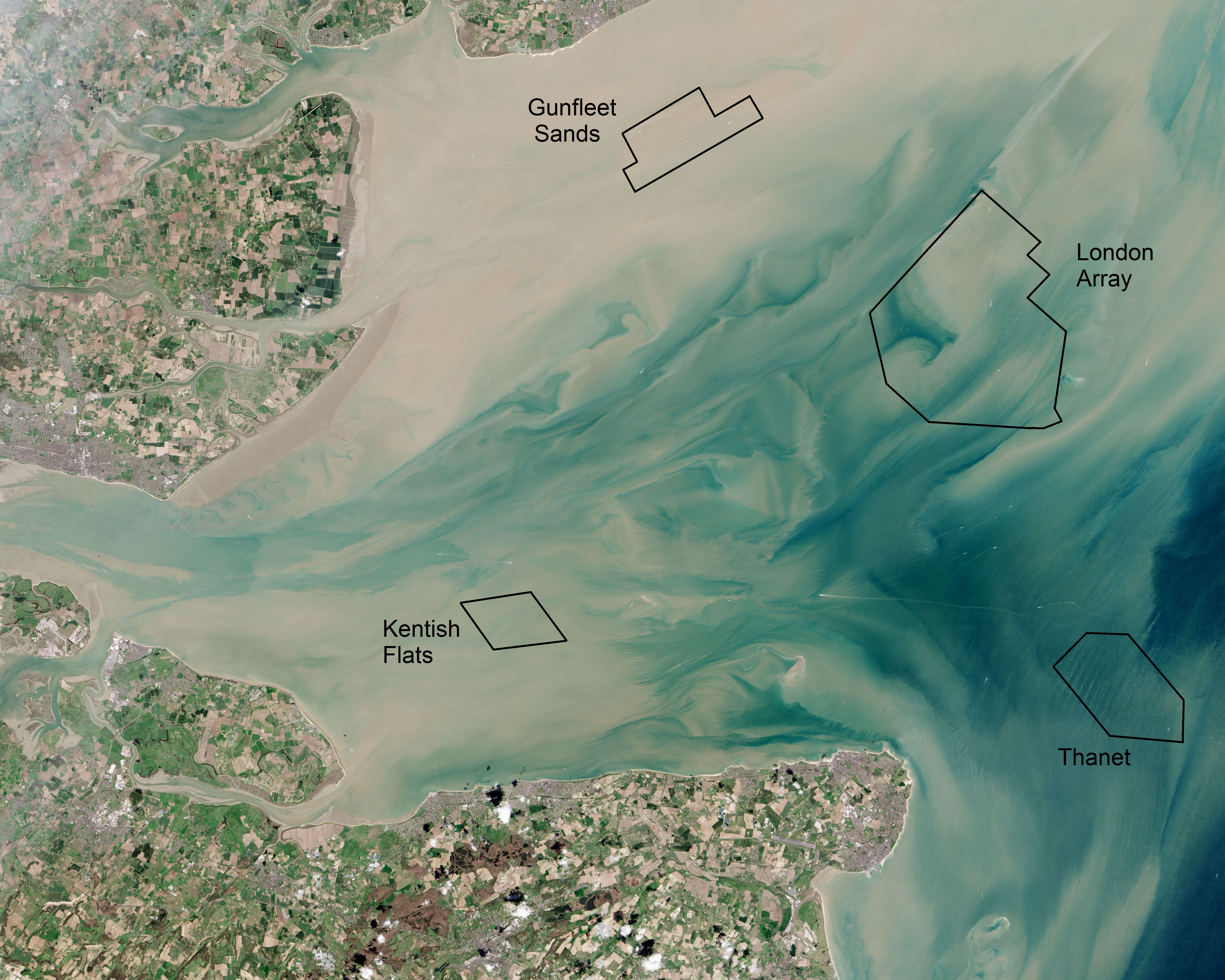
Four offshore wind farms are in the Thames Estuary area: Kentish Flats, Gunfleet Sands, Thanet and London Array. The latter was the largest in the world from April 2013 to September 2018.

=== Round 2 ===
Lessons learnt from Round 1, particularly the difficulty in getting planning consent for offshore wind farms, together with the increasing pressure to reduce CO_{2} emissions, prompted the then Department of Trade and Industry (DTI) to develop a strategic framework for the offshore wind industry. This identified three restricted areas for larger scale development, Liverpool Bay, the Thames Estuary and the area beyond the Wash, called the Greater Wash, in the North Sea. Development was prevented in an exclusion zone between 8 and 13 km offshore to reduce visual impact and avoid shallow feeding grounds for sea birds. The new areas were tendered to prospective developers in a competitive bid process known as Round 2. The results were announced in December 2003 with 15 projects awarded with a combined power generating capacity of 7.2 GW. By far the largest of these is the 900 MW Triton Knoll. As before a full Environmental Impact Assessment (EIA) would be needed along with an application for planning consent.

The first of the Round 2 projects was Gunfleet Sands II, completed in April 2010 and six others are now operational including the London Array, formerly the largest wind farm in the world. Four other Round 2 sites are currently under construction.

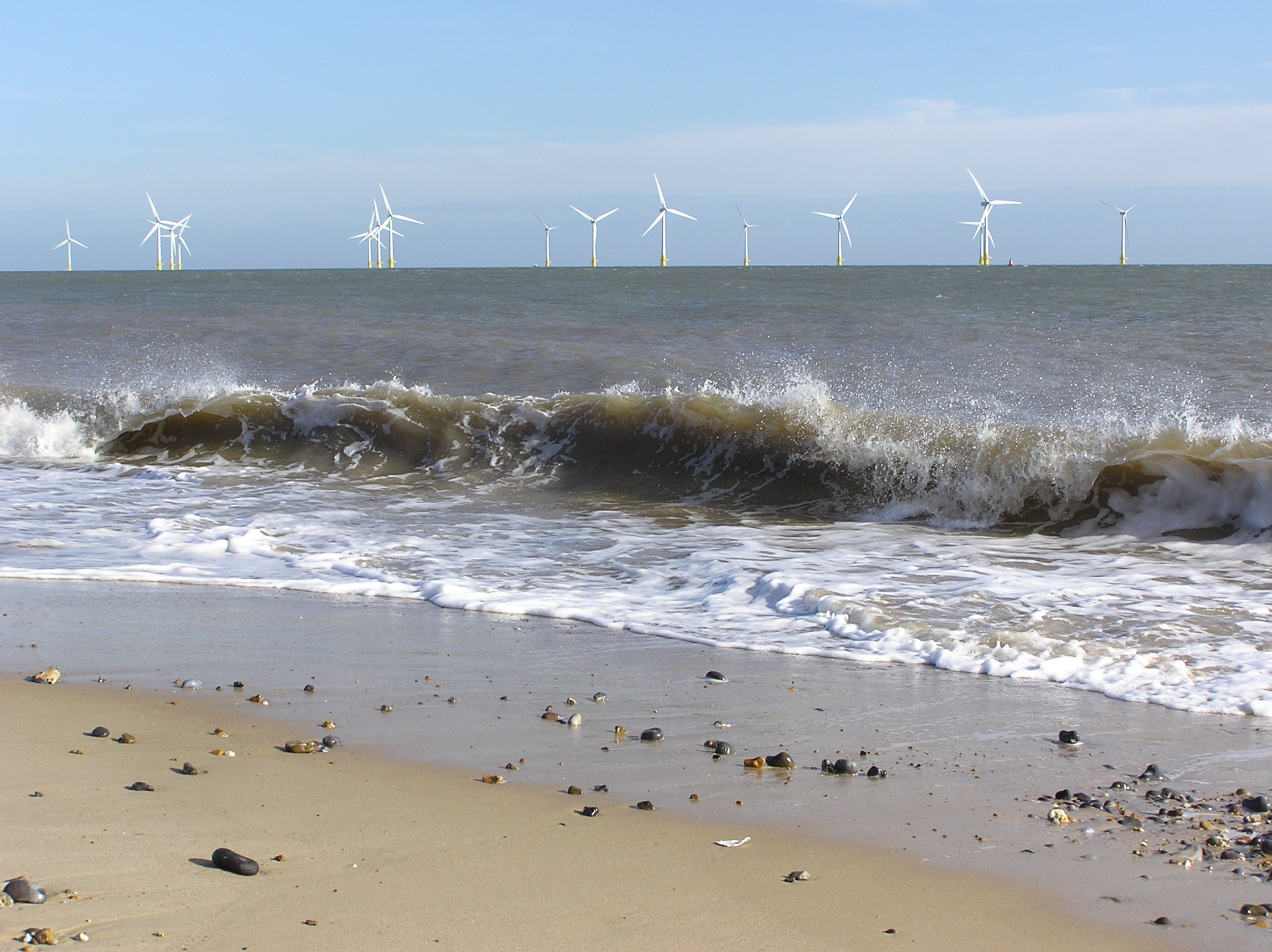
Scroby Sands wind farm from Great Yarmouth

=== Round 1 and 2 Extensions ===
In May 2010, the Crown Estate gave approval for seven Round 1 and 2 sites to be extended creating an additional 2 GW of offshore wind capacity. Each wind farm extension required a complete new planning application including an Environmental Impact Assessment and full consultation. The sites are:

- Burbo Bank and Walney: DONG Energy UK.
- Kentish Flats and Thanet: Vattenfall.
- Greater Gabbard: SSE Renewables and RWE Npower Renewables.
- Race Bank: Centrica Renewable Energy.
- Dudgeon: Statoil and Statkraft.

=== Round 3 ===
Following on from the Offshore wind SEA announced by the Government in December 2007, the Crown Estate launched a third round of site allocations in June 2008. It followed the success of Rounds 1 and 2, from which important lessons were learnt; Round 3 was on a much bigger scale than the combined total of its predecessors (Rounds 1 and 2 allocated 8 GW of sites, while Round 3 alone could identify up to 25 GW).

The Crown Estate proposed nine offshore zones, within which a number of individual wind farms would be situated. It ran a competitive tender process to award leases to consortia of potential developers. The bidding closed in March 2009 with over 40 applications from companies and consortia and multiple tenders for each zone. The successful bidders were announced on 8 January 2010.

Following the allocation of zones, individual planning applications still had to be sought by developers. The first zone came on stream in 2018; several more have still to be completed, and some have been abandoned (see below).

==== Round 3 consortia ====
During the bidding process there was considerable speculation over which companies had bid for the zones. The Crown Estate did not make the list public and most of the consortia also remained silent. The successful bidders for each zone were eventually announced as follows:

Round 3 wind farms
Zone	Zone name	Wind farm site names	Potential power (GW)	Developer	Notes
1	Moray Firth	Beatrice	1.3 (0.58)	Moray Offshore Renewables Ltd	Formed from EDP Renováveis and SeaEnergy Renewables Ltd (SERL); Project scaled down to 588 MW; Commenced commercial operation in 2018
2	Firth of Forth	Alpha/Bravo	3.5	Seagreen Wind Energy Ltd	Partnership between SSE Renewables and Fluor Ltd. SSE withdrawing support beyond the consent process.
3	Dogger Bank	Crekye A/B & Teesside A/B/C/D	7.2	Forewind Ltd	A consortium made up of SSE Renewables, RWE npower, Statkraft and Statoil. SSE withdrawing support beyond the consent process. Project scaled down to 4.8 GW in 2015; Expected to commence commercial operation in 2024
4	Hornsea	Hornsea One, Two, Three and Four (formerly Heron/Njord/Breesea/Optimus & SPC5/6/7/8)	6	Ørsted (formerly SMart Wind Ltd)	SMart Wind was a joint venture between Mainstream Renewable Power and Siemens Project Ventures. 100% acquired in 2015 by DONG Energy, which rebranded as Ørsted in 2017. Hornsea One (1.2 GW) became fully operational in December 2019. Hornsea Two (1.32 GW) became fully operational on 31 August 2022. Development consent for Hornsea Three (2.4 GW) was granted on 31 December 2020 and Ørsted signed the CfD for the project on 3 August 2022. Hornsea Four remains in development.
5	East Anglia	East Anglia ONE/TWO/THREE/ONE NORTH	7.2	East Anglia Offshore Wind Limited	Joint venture between ScottishPower Renewables and Vattenfall AB; ONE commenced commercial operations in 2020. THREE is currently under construction with commissioning planned for late 2026 Onshore groundwork for TWO and ONE NORTH started in 2025
6	Southern Array	Rampion	0.6 (0.4)	E.ON Climate & Renewables / UK Southern Array Ltd	Located south of Shoreham-by-Sea and Worthing in the English Channel; Commenced commercial operation in 2018
7	West of Isle of Wight	Navitus Bay	0.9	Eneco Round 3 Development Ltd	West of the Isle of Wight; partnership between Eneco and EDF. Planning permission refused by government in September 2015 due to visual impact.
8	Atlantic Array	Atlantic Array		Channel Energy Ltd (Innogy)	Withdrawn in November 2013 as "project uneconomic at current time"
9	Irish Sea	Celtic Array		Celtic Array Limited	Withdrawn in July 2014 due to "challenging ground conditions that make the project economically unviable".
Total			26.7		

In 2009, during the Round 3 initial proposal stage 26.7 GW of potential capacity was planned. However, due to government planning permission refusal, challenging ground conditions and project financing issues, a number of proposed sites were withdrawn. A number of other sites were also reduced in scope.

=== Round 4 ===
The Offshore Wind Leasing Round 4 Agreements for Lease signing concluded in January 2023, meaning six new projects could begin to generate renewable electricity by the end of the 2020s.

Three of the six projects are located off the North Wales, Cumbria and Lancashire coast, and three are located in the North Sea off the Yorkshire and Lincolnshire coast.

Round 4 wind farms
Zone	Zone name	Wind farm site names	Potential power (GW)	Developer	Notes
1	Dogger Bank	South (West)/ South (East)	3	RWE Renewables	
2	South East	Outer Dowsing	1.5	Total Energies and Corio Generation	
3	Northern Wales & Irish Sea	Mona & Morgan	3	EnBW and BP	
4	Northern Wales & Irish Sea	Morecambe	0.5	Morecambe offshore windfarm LTD	
Total			8		

=== Contracts for Difference Allocation Round 1 ===
Announced in 2014 with winners notified in February 2015, Contracts for Difference (CfD) Allocation Round 1 raised 1.1 GW of offshore wind development in two locations, East Anglia 1 (EA 1) and Neart na Gaoithe. The strike prices were £114.39 and £119.89.

=== Contracts for Difference Allocation Round 2 ===
Announced in 2017, the winners of Allocation Round 2 had three offshore wind developments giving 3.2 GW of power, Triton Knoll, Hornsea 2 and Moray Offshore. the strike price was £74.75 and £57.50.

=== Contracts for Difference Allocation Round 3 ===
Called by the Government Contracts for Difference (CfD) Allocation Round 3 was announced in 2019 and represented the first large scale new leasing round in a decade. This offers the opportunity for up to 7 GW of new offshore capacity to be developed in the waters around England and Wales. This is split into four bidding areas, Dogger Bank, Eastern Regions, South East and Northern Wales and Irish Sea.

Five commercial winners that would give a total capacity of 5.46 GW by 2024/25 at a strike price of £39 to £41 MWh were announced later in the year. Three at Doggerbank, Sofia Offshore Wind Farm Phase 1 and Seagreen Phase 1.

=== Contracts for Difference Allocation Round 4 ===
Announced in 2021, the CfD Allocation Round 4 results, which included winners for all types of renewable energy, were announced in July 2022 with 6.99 GW by 2026/27 and included Inch Cape Phase 1, EA3 Phase 1, Norfolk Boreas Phase 1, Hornsea Project Three and Moray West Offshore all at a strike price of £37.35.

=== Contracts for Difference Allocation Round 5 ===
Announced in 2022, the CfD Allocation Round 5 results announced in 2023 did not have any offshore wind, as the potential bidders did not believe the government had taken inflation and supply chain problems sufficiently into account.

=== Contracts for Difference Allocation Round 6 ===
A consultation was announced in late 2023 with comments requested by January 2024, with plans for a CfD Allocation Round 6 being announced in March 2024.

== Future plans ==
The UK has accelerated its decommissioning of coal power stations aiming for a 2024 phase-out date, and recent British nuclear power stations have encountered significant technical issues and project overruns that have resulted in significant increases in project costs. These issues have resulted in new UK nuclear projects failing to secure project financing. Similarly, SMR technology is not currently economically competitive with offshore wind in the UK. Following the Fukushima nuclear disaster public support for new nuclear has fallen. In response, the UK government increased its previous commitment for 40 GW of Offshore wind capacity by 2030. As of 2020, this represents a 355% increase over current capacity in 10 years. It is expected the Crown Estate will announce multiple new leasing Rounds and increases to existing bidding areas throughout the 2020–2030 period to achieve the government's aim of 40 GW.

== Scottish offshore ==
In addition to the 25 GW scoped under the Round 3 SEA, the Scottish Government and the Crown Estate also called for bids on potential sites within Scottish territorial waters. These were originally considered as too deep to provide viable sites, but 17 companies submitted tenders and the Crown Estate initially signed exclusivity agreements with 9 companies for 6 GW worth of sites. Following publication of the Scottish Government's sectoral marine plan for offshore wind energy in Scottish territorial waters in March 2010, six sites were given approval subject to securing detailed consent. Subsequently, 4 sites have been granted agreements for lease.

In 2022 Crown Estate announced the outcome of its application process for ScotWind Leasing, the first Scottish offshore wind leasing round in over a decade and the first ever since the management of offshore wind rights were devolved to Scotland. 17 projects were selected with a capacity of 25 GW.

== List of newly operational and proposed offshore wind farms ==
Operational
Under construction
Pre-construction
Planned

UK Offshore wind farms
Farm	Commissioned	Estimated completion	Power (MW)	No. Turbines	Operator	Notes	Round
Race Bank	February 2018		573	91	Ørsted and Macquarie Group	Consent granted July 2012	2
Aberdeen Bay (EOWDC)	September 2018		92	11	Vattenfall	Demonstration site for new turbines. Consent granted March 2013. Project under construction. Use of 8 MW turbines planned utilising the Vestas "short tower" option.	Demo
Kincardine (Phase 1)	October 2018		2	1	Kincardine Offshore Wind	Consent granted March 2017 Commercial scale demonstration of a floating wind farm.	Demo
Rampion	November 2018		400	116	RWE, Green Investment Bank, Enbridge	Construction began in January 2016. First electricity delivered to the grid in November 2017. RWE (50.1%) Green Investment Bank (25%) Enbridge (24.9%)	3
Beatrice	July 2019		588	84	SSE plc, Copenhagen Infrastructure Partners and Red Rock Power LTD	Offshore pile construction has started. Eligible for government CfD. First power generated in July 2018. Fully operational in June 2019 Uses Siemens Gamesa 7 MW turbines.	STW.
Hornsea Project One	January 2020		1218	174	Ørsted, Global Infrastructure Partners	Offshore construction began in January 2018. First power in March 2019. Eligible for government CfD. Use of Siemens Gamesa 7 MW turbines.	3
East Anglia ONE	July 2020		714	102	Vattenfall and Scottish Power Renewables	Consent granted June 2014. Uses Siemens Gamesa 7 MW turbines. Turbine installation was completed in April 2020.	3
Kincardine (Phase 2)	August 2021		48	5	Kincardine Offshore Wind	Consent granted March 2017 First turbine towed into place in August 2018 and first power generated in October 2018. Commercial scale demonstration of a floating wind farm.	Demo
Moray East	April 2022		950	100	EDP Renewables, Engie, Diamond Green, China Three Gorges	Consent granted March 2014. Use of Vestas 9.5MW turbines planned. First turbine installed January 2021. EDP Renewables (33.3%), Engie (23.3%), Diamond Green Limited (33.4%) and China Three Gorges (10%)	3
Triton Knoll	April 2022		855	90	RWE, J-Power, Kansai Electric Power	Consent granted July 2013 Uses Vestas 9.5MW turbines. All foundations completed in August 2020, first power in March 2021. RWE (59%), J-Power (24%) and Kansai Electric Power (16%)	2
Hornsea Project Two	August 2022		1386	165	Ørsted	Consent granted August 2016 for phase 2 (Breesea & Optimus Wind – 900MW each). Use of Siemens Gamesa 8.4MW turbines. First power in December 2021.	3
Seagreen (Phase 1)	October 2023		1140	114	SSE and Total	Consent granted October 2014 for phase 1 (Alpha & Bravo – 525MW each) Successful in the spring 2019 capacity auction. The project is projected to grow to 1,500 MW after phase 1. Vestas 10 MW turbines to be used. First foundation laid October 2021. First power in August 2022.	3
Moray West	April 2025		882	60	EDP Renewables, ENGIE	Consent granted June 2019. Partially successful ln CFD Round 4 for 294 MW of the project Offshore construction started early October 2023	
Neart Na Gaoithe	July 2025		448	54	EDF Renewables, ESB	Consent granted October 2014. Use of Siemens Gamesa 8MW turbines planned. Construction began in August 2020. EDF (50%) and ESB (50%).	STW
Dogger Bank A		2024	1235	95	SSE, Equinor, Eni	Consent granted February 2015 for phase 1 (Creyke Beck A & B – 1235MW each) Successful in the spring 2019 capacity auction. The wind farm will use 95 of the GE Haliade-X 13 MW. Equinor (40%), SSE Renewables (40%) and Eni (20%). First foundation laid in July 2022. First power transmitted 10 October 2023	
Dogger Bank B		2024–25	1235	95	SSE, Equinor, Eni	Consent granted February 2015 for phase 1 (Creyke Beck A & B – 1235MW each) Successful in the spring 2019 capacity auction. The wind farm will use 95 of the GE Haliade-X 13 MW. Equinor (40%), SSE Renewables (40%) and Eni (20%).	3
Dogger Bank C		2024–25 (Phase 1), revised completion 2026	1218	87	SSE and Equinor	Formerly known as Teesside A. Consent granted August 2015. Successful in the spring 2019 capacity auction. The wind farm is planning to use the Haliade-X 14 MW from GE, the world's largest wind turbine.	3
East Anglia THREE		2026–27	1372	100	Scottish Power Renewables, Vattenfall and OPR	Consent granted August 2017. Successful ln CFD Round 4 Construction started July 2022.	3
Hornsea Project Three		2026–27	2852	231	Ørsted	Consent granted in 2020. Final investment decision confirmed December 2023 Successful in CFD Round 4	3
Inch Cape		2026–27	1080	72	Red Rock Power and ESB	Consent granted October 2014. RSPB Judicial Review overturned. Project downsized to 784 MW following issues raised during consultations. New application in August 2018 with fewer but taller turbines. Successful in CFD Round 4	STW
Sofia		2023–24 (Phase 1), revised completion 2026	1400	100	RWE	Consent granted August 2015. Formerly known as Dogger Bank Teesside B. Successful in the spring 2019 capacity auction. Use of Siemens Gamesa 14 MW turbines planned.	3
Norfolk Boreas		2026–27	1396	unknown	Vattenfall, now RWE	Consent Granted December 2021. Successful in CFD Round 4. Development was suspended in July 2023 due to rising costs. Development was purchased by RWE and is expected to resume.	4
Norfolk Vanguard West		2028–29	1545	92	Vattenfall, now RWE	A development consent order was given for the project in June 2020. The project aims to install all of the offshore cabling for the Vanguard location as well as the sister wind farm, Boreas which is located adjacent to the project.	7
Norfolk Vanguard East		2028–29	1545	92	Vattenfall, now RWE	A development consent order was given for the project in June 2020. The project aims to install all of the offshore cabling for the Vanguard location as well as the sister wind farm, Boreas which is located adjacent to the project.	7
Dounreay Trì		2026	10	2	Hexicon AB and Dounreay Tri	Consent granted March 2017. Has since been put on hold	
Dogger Bank D			1320	unknown	SSE and Equinor	Initial surveys started in mid-August and are expected to run until the end of November 2022	
Dogger Bank South			3000	unknown	RWE	Go ahead to enter lease agreement with Crown Estate July 2022. Survey work complete October 2022.	4
Seagreen 1A			500	36	SSE and Total	Consent from Scottish Government to increase the capacity of this phase from 360 MW to 500 MW October 2022	
Rampion 2		2026	1200	90	RWE	The project was approved in 2025	
North Falls		2030	504	up to 72	RWE	Secured Agreements for Lease with the Crown Estate in 2020	
Sheringham Shoal Wind Farm Extension			719	up to 56	Equinor	Application for Sheringham Shoal Wind Farm Extension submitted	
Dudgeon Wind Farm Extension			Shared with Sheringham Shoal	Shared with Sheringham Shoal	Equinor	Application for Dudgeon Offshore Wind Farm Extension submitted	
Awel y Môr		2030	estimated 500	up to 50	RWE	DCO granted September 2023. Application for Marine License submitted.	
