= Gardline Group =

Holding company based in Great Yarmouth, England

Gardline Group Ltd
- Company type: Private (Ltd)
- Founded: Great Yarmouth, England
- Headquarters: Great Yarmouth, Norfolk
- Revenue: £200m (2013)
- Number of employees: 1,000+
- Website: www.gardline.com

The Gardline Group is a holding company based in Great Yarmouth, England. Before the acquisition by Boskalis in 2017, the group consisted of more than 35 companies focused primarily on service industries. After the acquisition, Gardline sold some of its group companies. The holding company was established in 2009 to bring together a number of existing companies including the original Gardline Shipping, first established in 1969, which continues today, focussed on shipping and other maritime services.

== History ==
Gardline Shipping was first established in 1969 to provide marine support to the offshore oil and gas industry in the North Sea. In 2009, as part of 40th anniversary celebrations, the Gardline Group was established to bring together many multidisciplinary companies involved in a range of activities that include satellite communications, marine sciences, security, ship building, dry dock engineering, geographical information systems, digital mapping and vessel charters.

=== Offshore wind farms ===
In 2010, the company was awarded environmental survey work for the proposed Atlantic Array offshore wind farm project.

In 2013, Alicat Workboats, a former Gardline subsidiary, announced the construction of 4 high-speed catamarans to service the Robin Rigg Wind Farm.

== Group companies ==
Gardline Marine Sciences Logo

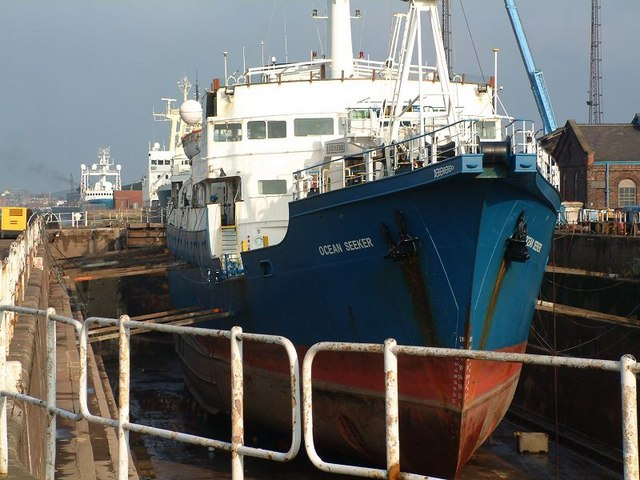
Three Gardline ships awaiting dry dock repairs in Hull, "Ocean Seeker", "Ocean Observer" and "Sea Explorer".

The Gardline Group is a multinational corporation with companies and offices around the world.

=== America ===
In the United States, the company was represented by GComm and Gardline Surveys Inc, which became an independently owned and managed company in May 2018 and is no longer a part of the Gardline group.

=== Europe ===
In Europe, the company has a number of major subsidiaries including, Titan Environmental Surveys Ltd.

=== Australasia ===
In Malaysia, Gardline was represented by Asian Geos Sdn Bhd (Java Offshore Sdn Bhd completed the acquisition of a majority stake in Asian Geos Sdn Bhd from Gardline Geosciences Ltd and Helms Geomarine Sdn Bhd in 2017.

== Gardline Shipping ==
As the original foundation entity of the Gardline Group, Gardline Shipping retains the core businesses of the Gardline Group.

The company operates a fleet of 11 vessels. The fleet is capable of carrying out geotechnical, geophysical, and environmental surveys.

=== Current fleet ===
Ocean Discovery - Decommissioned

Ship	Built	Reconfigured	Accommodation	Length	Tonnage	Flag	IMO Number	Image
Ocean Vantage	1985	2016	35 berths	68m	2,191 GT	Panama	8405440 8405440	
Ocean Resolution	2015	2019	48 berths	79.2m	4,657 GT	United Kingdom	9779446	
Ocean Endeavour (ex RMAS Salmaster)	1986	2004	32 berths	77.1 m	1,967 GT	United Kingdom	8402008	
Ocean Observer	1986	2007	39 berths	80.4 m	2,820 GT	United Kingdom	8511275	
Kommandor	1986	2011	44 + hospital berth	68.5 m	1,573 GT	United Kingdom	8517205	
Ocean Reliance	1987	2012	40 berths	85.4 m	1,814 GT	Panama	8616609	
Geodiscovery	2002			83.9m	3,360 GT	Panama	9263514	
Ocean Geograph	2007	2021	48 berths	70m	2,733 GT	Panama	9267388	
Ocean Researcher (ex RRS Charles Darwin)	1984	2005	39 berths	69.4 m	2,556 GT	United Kingdom	8207941	
Horizon Geobay	1978			87.0 m	3,502 GT	Panama	7801556	
Kommandor Susan	1999		30 berths	83.70m	3,388 GT	United Kingdom	9177844	

=== Past Gardline Vessels ===
Vessel	Image
Surveyor (Gardline's first ship)	
The Profiler in Falmouth, October 1973, while on contract to the Institute of Geological Sciences for geophysical surveys of the Southwestern Approaches. The vessel was equipped with an Askania GSS3 marine gravity meter mounted in the centre of the ship (the former saloon) on a gyrostabilised gimbal platform. Shallow profiling of the sub-bottom sediments was achieved with a sparker source and single-channel hydrophone streamer. A magnetometer was towed.	
Sea Profiler (ex RRS Shackleton, British Antarctic Survey ship)	
Sea Searcher (ex Johan Mansson, a Swedish Government hydrographic research vessel)	
Gardline Seeker (later used as pirate radio station vessel with Laser 558)	
Gardline Tracker	
Gardline Endurer	
Resolution (ex German deep sea trawler)	
Researcher (ex INGØY, built 1950 as local passenger/cargo vessel in Norway, sold to Gardline in 1970)	
Gallion	
Gardian 1	
Gardian 2	
Gardian 7	
Gardian 9	
Marianarray	
Smeaton Array	
Waterfall	

=== Gallery ===
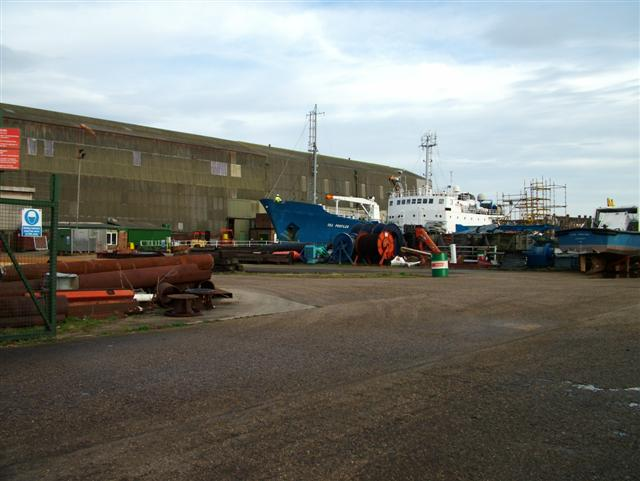
Sea Profiler In Great Yarmouth dry dock

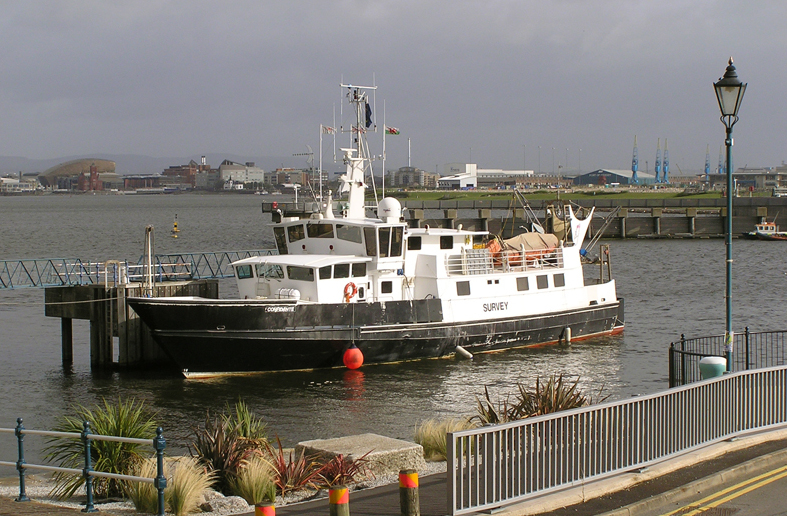
Confidante in old black colours

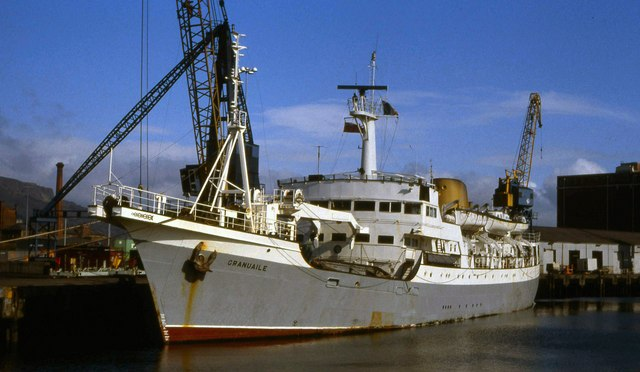
Ocean Seeker was Granuaile prior to purchase from Gardline
