= RRS Shackleton =

British Antarctic research vessel

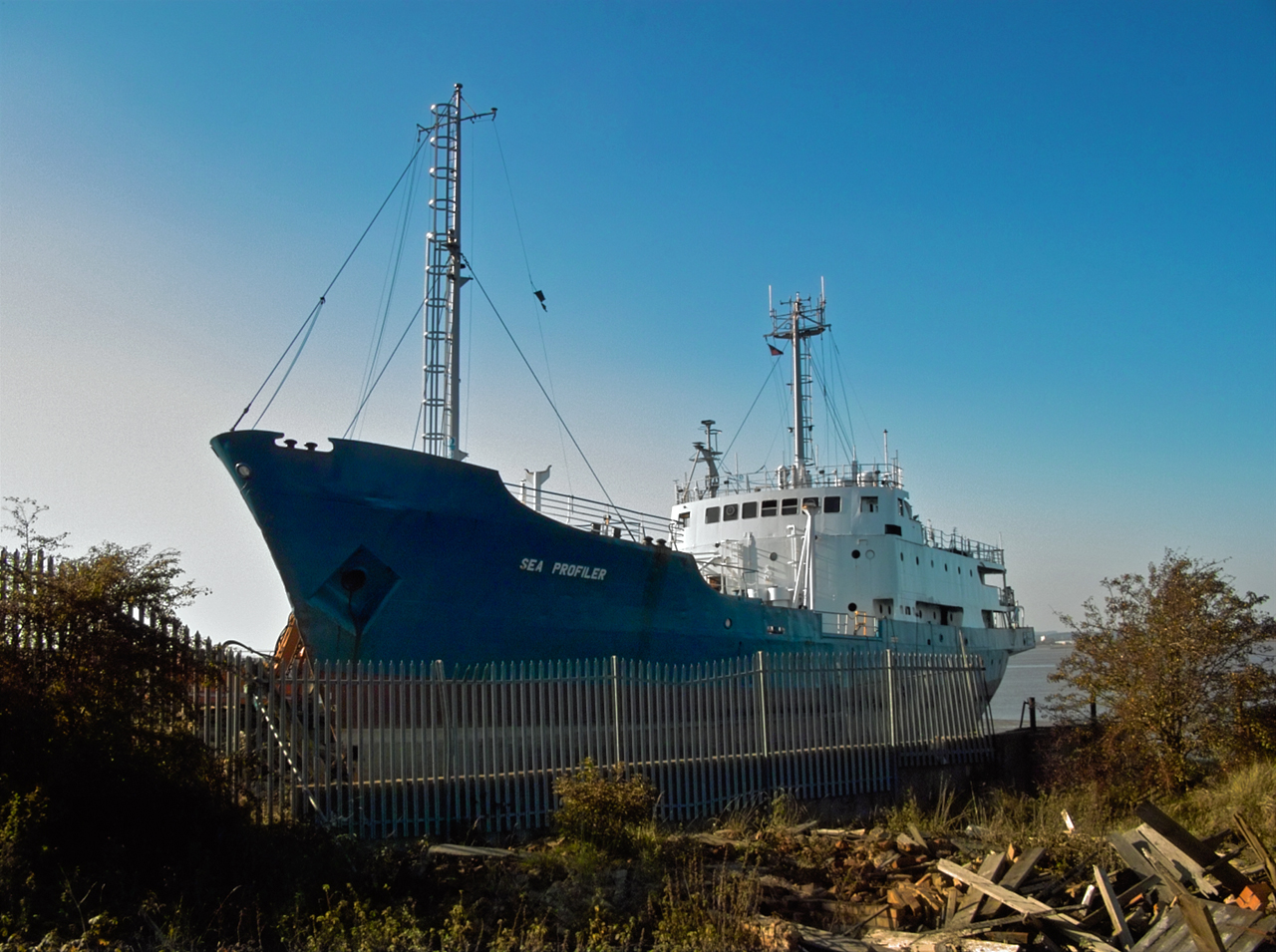
- Sea Profiler awaiting scrapping in 2011

History

United Kingdom
- Name: RRS Shackleton
- Namesake: Ernest Shackleton
- Operator: Falkland Islands Dependency Survey / British Antarctic Survey / NERC
- Builder: Solvesborgs Varv A/B at Sölvesborg, Sweden
- Yard number: 41
- Launched: 11 November 1954
- Completed: February 1955
- Acquired: 1955
- In service: 1955
- Out of service: 1992
- Refit: 1971

Panama
- Name: MV Sea Profiler
- Operator: Gardline Shipping Limited., Great Yarmouth
- Acquired: 1992
- Identification: IMO number: 5321576; MMSI number: 351133000; Callsign: HP6791
- Fate: Scrapped in 2011

General characteristics
- Type: Research ship
- Tonnage: 1,082 GT
- Length: 65.78 m (215.8 ft)
- Beam: 11.08 m (36.4 ft)
- Draught: 4.66 m (15.3 ft)
- Propulsion: MAN 6-cylinder diesel, 785 BHP at 275 RPM, Kamena reversible pitch propeller
- Speed: 9.7 knots (18.0 km/h; 11.2 mph) (maximum); 7.8 knots (14.4 km/h; 9.0 mph) (average)
- Endurance: 28 days
- Complement: 31 berths

RRS Shackleton was a Royal Research Ship operated by the British scientific research organisations the Falkland Islands Dependencies Survey (FIDS), British Antarctic Survey (BAS) and Natural Environment Research Council (NERC) in the Antarctic from 1955 to 1983. She was subsequently operated as a seismic survey vessel under the names Geotek Beta, Profiler and finally Sea Profiler before being scrapped in 2011.

== History ==
Built in 1954 by Sölvesborgs Varv A/B at Sölvesborg, Sweden, she was launched as MV Arendal (III) for work in the Baltic. She was purchased in 1955 by the Falkland Islands Dependency Survey (FIDS. British Antarctic Survey (BAS) from 1962) as a supply vessel to re-stock British research stations. After conversion to carry more passengers, she was renamed RRS Shackleton and sailed to the Antarctic for the 1955/56 season.

On 29 Nov 1957 Shackleton, having completed the relief of the FIDS research station on Signy Island, was seriously damaged when she hit an iceberg off Coronation Island and was holed in two places below the waterline. The ship started to take on water and was almost lost. Temporary repairs allowed the vessel to reach the whaling station of Stromness on South Georgia, more than 500 miles from the accident, where the hull was repaired. She was met en-route by HMS Protector, which provided an additional pump and shipwrights to help contain the damage and took off scientists and other passengers.

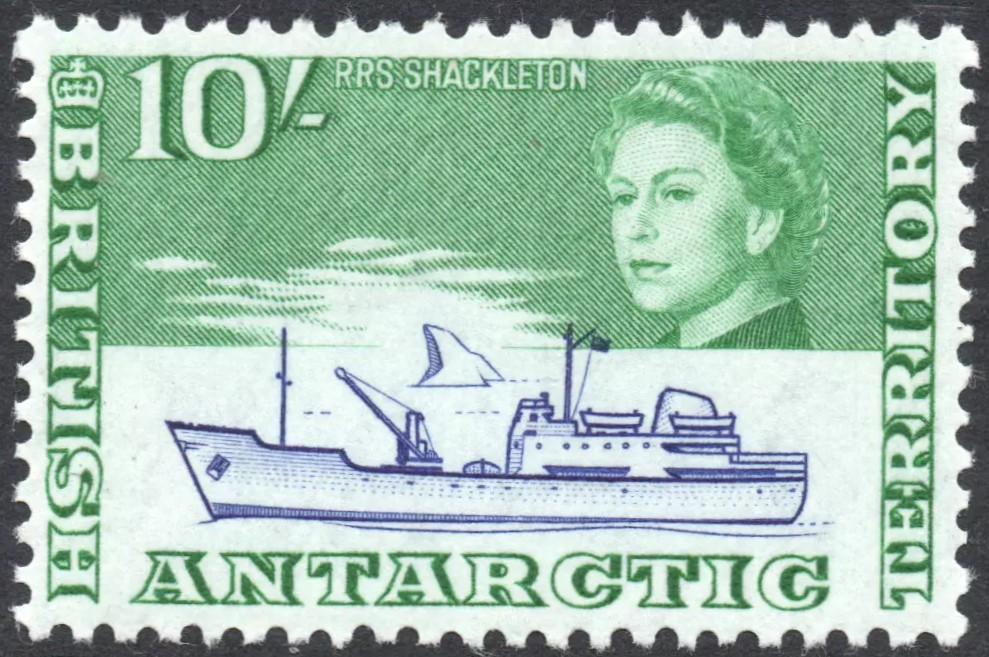
1963 British Antarctic Territory stamp featuring Shackleton

From 1959 scientists from Birmingham University's Sub-department of Geophysics regularly undertook research from Shackleton, focusing on the marine geophysics of the Scotia Arc. This included two-ship seismic refraction experiments working with HMS Protector, sonobuoy work and magnetic surveys.

At Deception Island in 1966 the Shackleton met and provisioned Bill Tilman's SV Mischief, the first private expedition to visit a British Antarctic base. Shackleton joined the rescue of Deception Island base members when the volcano erupted in December 1967 and again in February 1969. She was withdrawn from service by BAS at the end of the 1968/69 season. following a decision to replace her with a new vessel.

Shackleton was operated by the NERC after 1969, and underwent major conversion to fit her as a oceanographic research ship, starting in November 1970 at the shipyard of James Lamont, Greenock. Construction work was completed in 1971 and her first Antarctic cruise with NERC was in 1971/72, continuing geophysical and marine geology work on the Scotia Arc. On 4 February 1976, while taking part in a British economic survey of the Falkland Islands led by Lord Shackleton (son of the Antarctic explorer Sir Ernest Shackleton), RRS Shackleton was fired on by the Argentine destroyer ARA Almirante Storni in a precursor to the Falklands Conflict. She was withdrawn from service in May 1983 and sold. During her service with NERC the ship carried out cruises in the Antarctic, Arctic, Atlantic, Pacific and Indian Oceans, the Mediterranean and Red Sea.

Shackleton was renamed Geotek Beta in 1983. In 1984 she was purchased by Gardline Shipping Limited and renamed Profiler. She was 'retired' from the South Atlantic in 1989 and reconfigured as a soils and high resolution seismic survey vessel, operated by Gardline Shipping Limited. They renamed her Sea Profiler in 1992. She was scrapped in New Holland on the Humber estuary in 2011.

== Sources ==
- BAS (1968). British Antarctic Survey Annual Report 1967-68. BAS.
- BAS (1969). British Antarctic Survey Annual Report 1968-69. BAS.
- BAS (1979). British Antarctic Survey Annual Report 1969-70. BAS.
- Fuchs, Vivian (1982). Of Ice and Men. Oswestry: Anthony Nelson. ISBN 0-904614-06-9.
- NERC (1971). Natural Environment Research Council Report of the Council for the Year 1 April 1970 - 31 March 1971. NERC.
- NERC (1972). Natural Environment Research Council Report of the Council for the Year 1 April 1971 - 31 March 1972. NERC.
- NERC (1983). Natural Environment Research Council Report of the Council for the Year 1 April 1982 - 31 March 1983. NERC.
- NERC (1984). Natural Environment Research Council Report of the Council for the Year 1 April 1983 - 31 March 1984. NERC.
- Woodfield, Thomas (2016). Polar Mariner. Beyond the Limits in Antarctica. Scotland: Whittles Publishing. ISBN 978-184995-166-1.
