= EVgo =

American electric vehicle charging company

EVgo Inc.
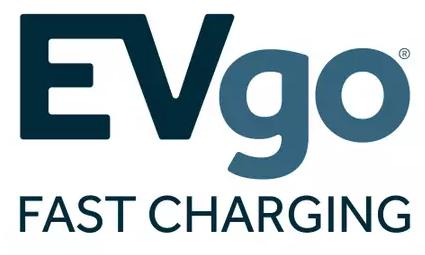
- Type: Public
- Traded as: Nasdaq: EVGO
- Industry: Electric vehicle charging infrastructure
- Founded: October 2010; 16 years ago
- Headquarters: El Segundo, California, United States
- Area served: United States
- Key people: Badar Khan (CEO); Dennis Kish (president); David Nanus (chairman)
- Services: DC fast charging services; Electric vehicle charging infrastructure development and operation; Charging network management and software services
- Revenue: US$384.1 million (2025)
- Net income: −US$95.4 million (2025)
- Owner: LS Power (controlling shareholder)
- Number of employees: 376 (2025)
- Subsidiaries: PlugShare (PlugShare LLC)
- Website: www.evgo.com

EVgo Inc. is an American company that operates a public electric vehicle DC fast charging network in the United States. As of June 2026, EVgo reported more than 1,200 fast-charging locations across 47 states. Its charging stations support CCS, CHAdeMO, and NACS connectors, with connector availability varying by location.

== History ==
EVgo was created in 2010 as part of a settlement between NRG Energy and the California Public Utilities Commission in the aftermath of the Enron scandal. The company was required to invest $100 million in the installation of public electric vehicle chargers. In 2016, EVgo was sold to investment group Vision Ridge Partners, and then again, in 2020, to LS Power.

EVgo's common stock began trading on the NASDAQ on July 2, 2021, under the ticker symbol EVGO. The same month, EVgo acquired Recargo, the California company which develops the PlugShare electric vehicle charging station locator application, for US$25 million.

In June 2022, the company announced a partnership with General Motors (GM) to expand compatibility and access for GM vehicles. Along with this announcement, EVgo also unveiled the EVgo eXtend project in collaboration with General Motors (GM) and Pilot Company. This initiative aims to deploy 2,000 high-power fast charging stalls at Pilot and Flying J locations across the U.S. The charging stalls, with a capacity of 350 kW, will be installed, operated, and maintained by EVgo and networked through EVgo eXtend. These sites are planned among major charging corridors and current Pilot/Flying J travel stops with canopies, pull-through stations, and other amenities. At the annual CES tech trade show in January 2023, EVgo announced a partnership with online retailer Amazon to allow drivers with Alexa-equipped cars to locate, schedule and pay for charging using Alexa, with a planned roll-out later in 2023. The company installed its 1000th fast DC charger on August 1, 2023, in Woodridge, Illinois. As of December 2023, these new stations are now available in 13 states with 17 locations available to the public.

In May 2024, EVgo reported surpassing one million registered customer accounts, an increase of 400% since April 2020. In September 2024, EVgo and General Motors (GM) announced plans to deploy 400 fast-charging stalls at flagship locations in major U.S. metropolitan areas. The planned stations would feature chargers capable of delivering up to 350 kW, overhead canopies, improved lighting, and pull-through stalls for vehicles towing trailers. In December 2024, the companies surpassed 2,000 operational fast-charging stalls through their metropolitan charging collaboration, spanning more than 390 locations across 32 states.

By June 2026, EVgo reported more than 1.8 million customer accounts. In August 2026, EVgo, GM, and Pilot Company announced that their highway charging collaboration had surpassed 300 locations and 1,300 fast-charging stalls across 40 states.

Also in August 2026, EVgo announced an agreement with Tesla to deploy Tesla V4 Supercharger equipment under license. The chargers, capable of delivering up to 500 kW, were planned to support both NACS and CCS connectors and be integrated into Tesla's vehicle navigation system. That month, EVgo and GM also opened a flagship charging station in Warren, Michigan, bringing the flagship program to more than 40 operational charging stalls nationwide.

In September 2026, EVgo unveiled plans for a next-generation charging system capable of delivering up to 750 kW, developed with Delta Electronics. The system uses dynamic power sharing between charging stalls and was expected to begin deployment in 2027.

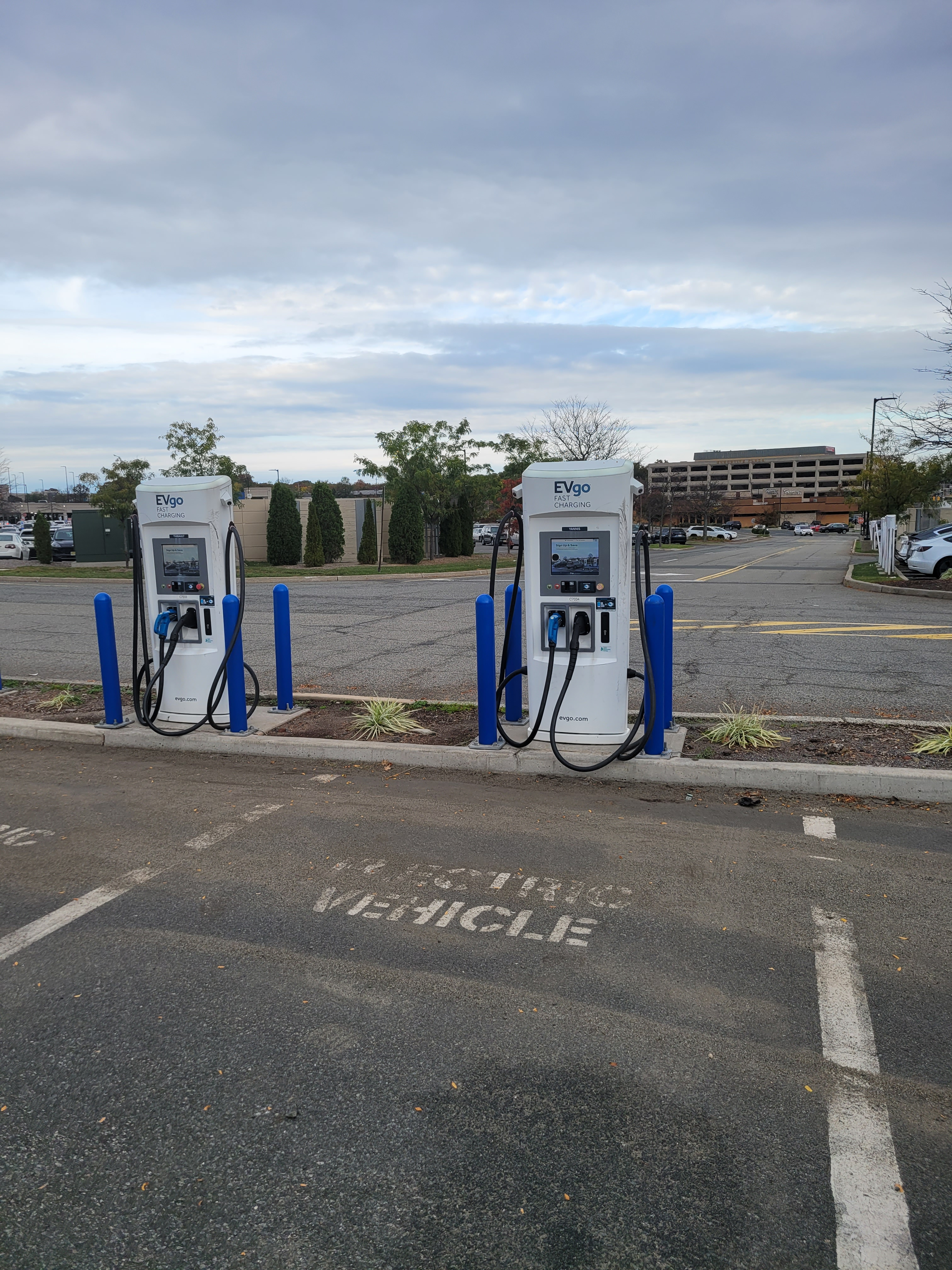
An EVgo charging station

== Operations ==
EVgo charging stations use CCS Combo 1 and CHAdeMO connectors, and at some locations, North American Charging System (Tesla) connectors. (Tesla drivers can also use their own CCS and CHAdeMO adapters).

EVgo currently has agreements with various automakers for their electric vehicles to use its network of chargers or provide discounted charging rates or complimentary charging, including GM, Honda, and Toyota. In 2022, EVgo launched Plug and Charge for compatible General Motors vehicles, and Autocharge+ for compatible CCS and Tesla vehicles when using a CCS adapter. These protocols automatically arrange for payment when a car is plugged in.

EVgo stations tend to be located at convenience stores and other retail establishments which already have parking lots, allowing drivers to make purchases while their cars are charging. It is also receiving funding to build stations near apartment buildings in California, among other government accelerated-build programs. EVgo also provides chargers for a fleet of Kenworth T680E semi-tractor trailers at the Fontana, California facility of logistics company MHX. Various government agencies and car manufactures have discount programs on the EVgo network, as do ridesharing companies Uber and Lyft. EVgo also partners with Hertz, providing special charging rates to drivers renting any EV model at a Hertz location across the country.

In November 2023, EVgo announced an expansion of its partnership with Meijer, a regional grocery retailer, to install new fast-charging stations in Ohio featuring up to six charging stalls and 350 kW chargers. In November 2024, the companies further expanded their agreement, announcing plans to install up to 480 additional fast-charging stalls at as many as 60 Meijer properties across six Midwestern states, with deployments targeted through 2027.

In December 2024, EVgo closed a $1.25 billion loan facility guaranteed by the United States Department of Energy to support expansion of its charging network. At the time, the company projected that the financing would support approximately 7,500 new fast-charging stalls nationwide by 2029.

In July 2025, EVgo secured an additional $225 million commercial-bank credit facility, with an option to increase the amount to $300 million, to support the construction of more than 1,500 charging stalls across its public and fleet charging networks.

In January 2026, EVgo announced an expansion of its collaboration with Kroger, planning to install at least 150 fast-charging stalls annually through 2035 at Kroger-affiliated grocery stores across the United States. The first station under the expanded program opened in Salt Lake City, Utah.

In April 2026, EVgo amended its Department of Energy loan agreement, reducing the maximum guaranteed facility amount from approximately $1.25 billion to $750 million, consisting of $625 million in borrowing principal and up to $125 million in capitalized interest.

In August 2026, EVgo and Brixmor Property Group announced an expansion of their partnership to install more than 500 additional fast-charging stalls at shopping centers nationwide, bringing the planned network to at least 90 Brixmor properties. That month, EVgo also opened a new flagship charging station at a Meijer store in Warren, Michigan, in collaboration with General Motors. The station features 12 high-power charging stalls with CCS and NACS connectors.

In September 2026, EVgo and Regency Centers announced plans to install more than 400 additional fast-charging stalls at grocery-anchored shopping centers across the United States, expanding a partnership that began in 2020.

=== Mobile application ===
EVgo operates a mobile application for iOS and Android that allows electric vehicle drivers to locate charging stations, check real-time charger availability, initiate and monitor charging sessions, and manage their accounts. The app provides navigation to charging locations, station pricing information, and filters for connector type and charging speed. At participating locations, drivers can also reserve charging stalls.

In October 2017, EVgo introduced a mobile application that allowed drivers to initiate charging sessions without using a physical access card. In December 2021, the company launched a redesigned application featuring vehicle-specific charging station recommendations, improved search functionality, and integration with its customer loyalty program.

The app also supports enrollment in EVgo's Autocharge+ service, introduced in September 2022, which enables compatible vehicles to initiate charging automatically after being connected to an EVgo fast charger.

=== PlugShare ===
EVgo owns PlugShare, a mobile application and online platform that allows electric vehicle drivers to locate charging stations, plan trips, and share information about charging locations. Through its subsidiary PlugShare LLC, EVgo also provides charging infrastructure data, analytics, and advertising services to automakers and other commercial customers.

EVgo acquired PlugShare through its purchase of Recargo in July 2021 for approximately $25 million. By December 2025, PlugShare had approximately 7.8 million registered users.

== See also ==
- Charging station
- Electric vehicle network
