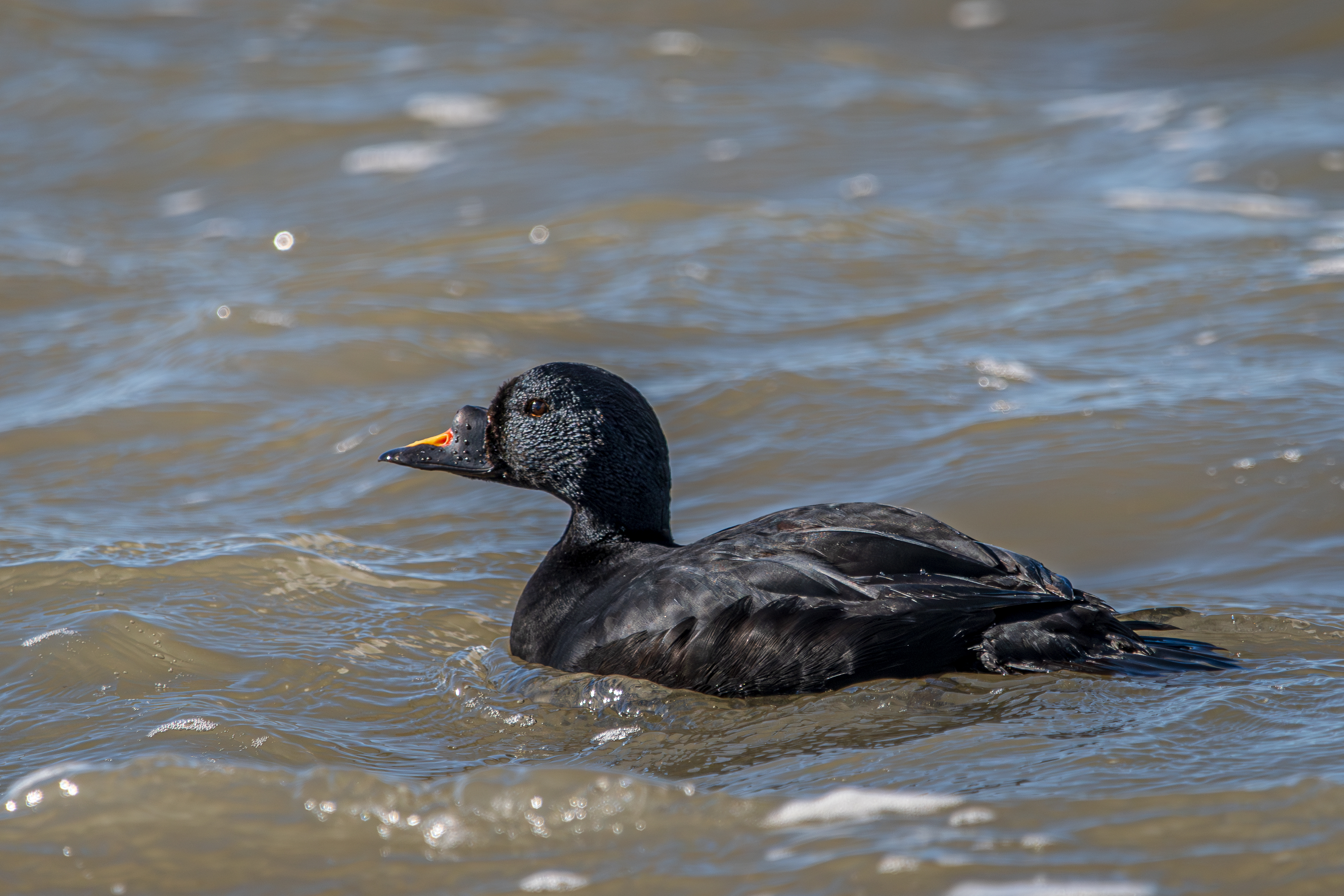
- Male in Lower Saxon Wadden Sea National Park, Germany

Conservation status
- Least Concern (IUCN 3.1)

Scientific classification
- Kingdom: Animalia
- Phylum: Chordata
- Class: Aves
- Order: Anseriformes
- Family: Anatidae
- Genus: Melanitta
- Subgenus: Oidemia
- Species: M. nigra

Binomial name
- Melanitta nigra (Linnaeus, 1758)
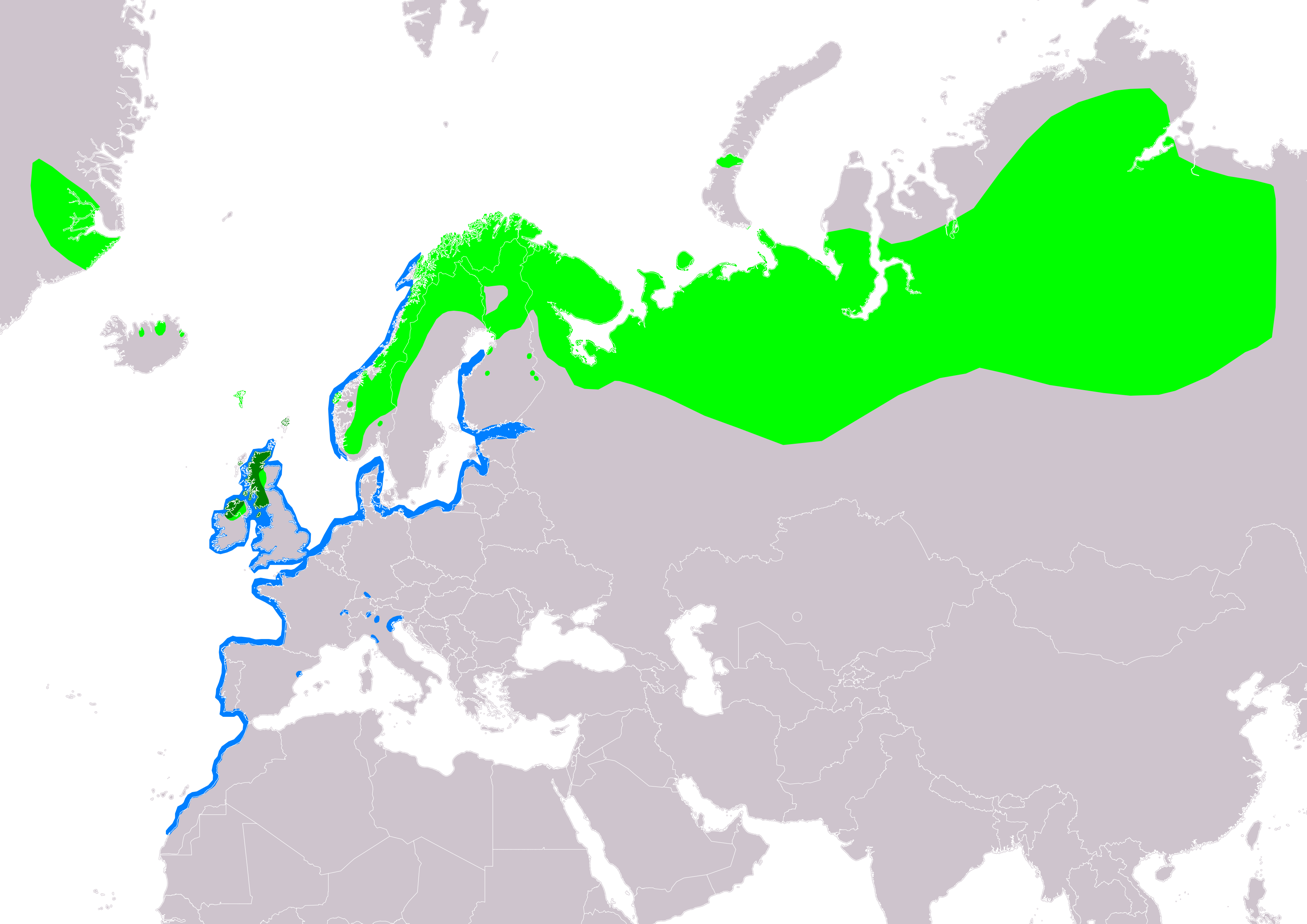
- Range of M. nigra Breeding Resident Non-breeding

Synonyms
- Anas nigra Linnaeus, 1758

= Common scoter =

Species of bird

The common scoter (Melanitta nigra) is a large sea duck, 43–54 cm (17–21 in) in length, which breeds over the far north of Europe and the Palearctic east to the Olenyok River. The black scoter (M. americana) of North America and eastern Siberia was formerly considered to be a subspecies.

== Taxonomy ==
The common scoter was formally described in 1758 by the Swedish naturalist Carl Linnaeus in the tenth edition of his Systema Naturae under the binomial name Anas nigra. Linnaeus specified the type locality as Lapland, England. The common scoter is now one of six species placed in the genus Melanitta that was introduced in 1822 by the German zoologist Friedrich Boie. The genus name combines the Ancient Greek melas meaning "black" and netta meaning "duck". The common scoter was formerly considered to be conspecific with the black scoter (Melanitta americana) but the two taxa are now treated as separate species. The common scoter is monotypic: no subspecies are recognised.

== Description ==
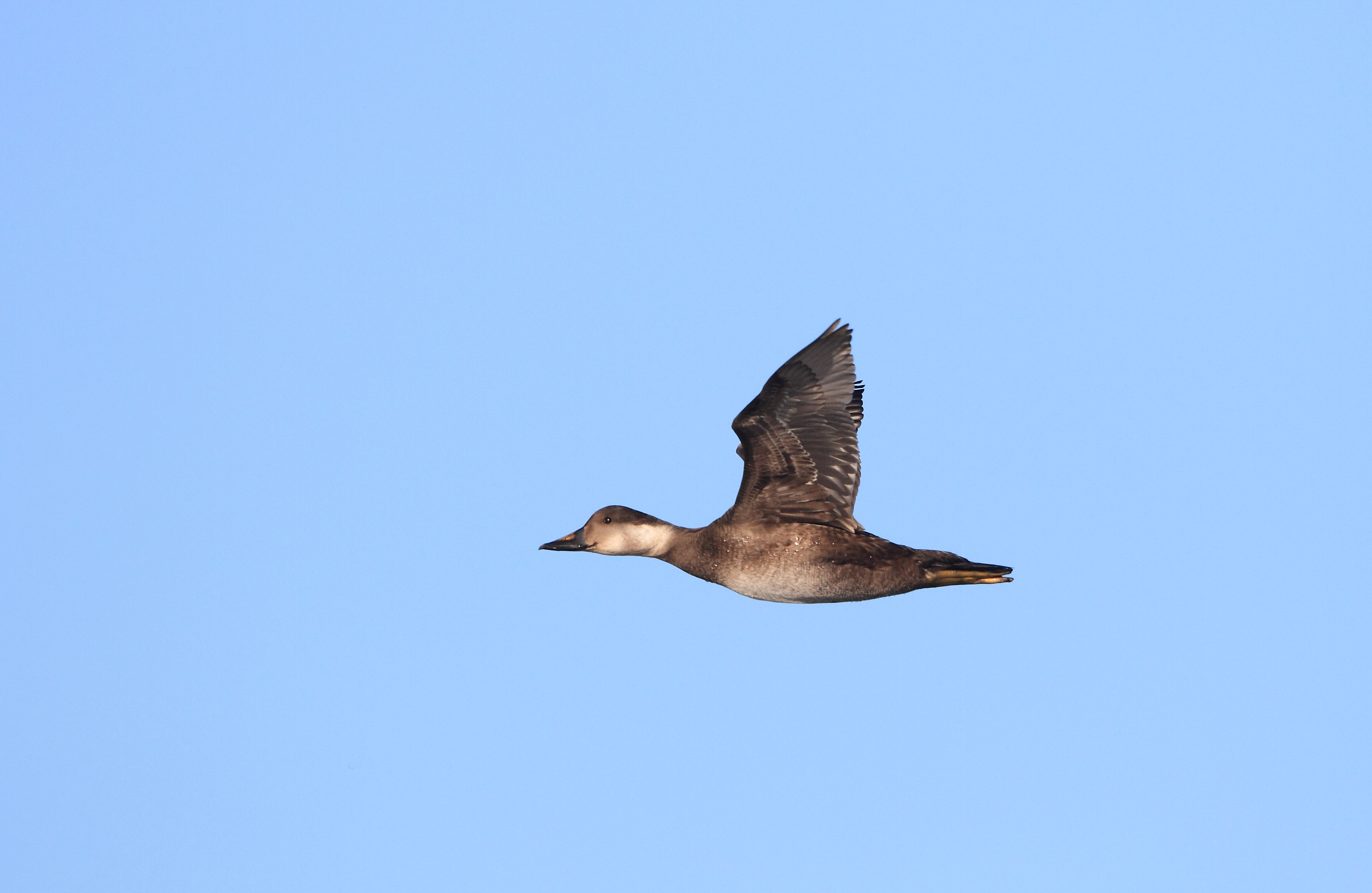
Juvenile in flight, Norway

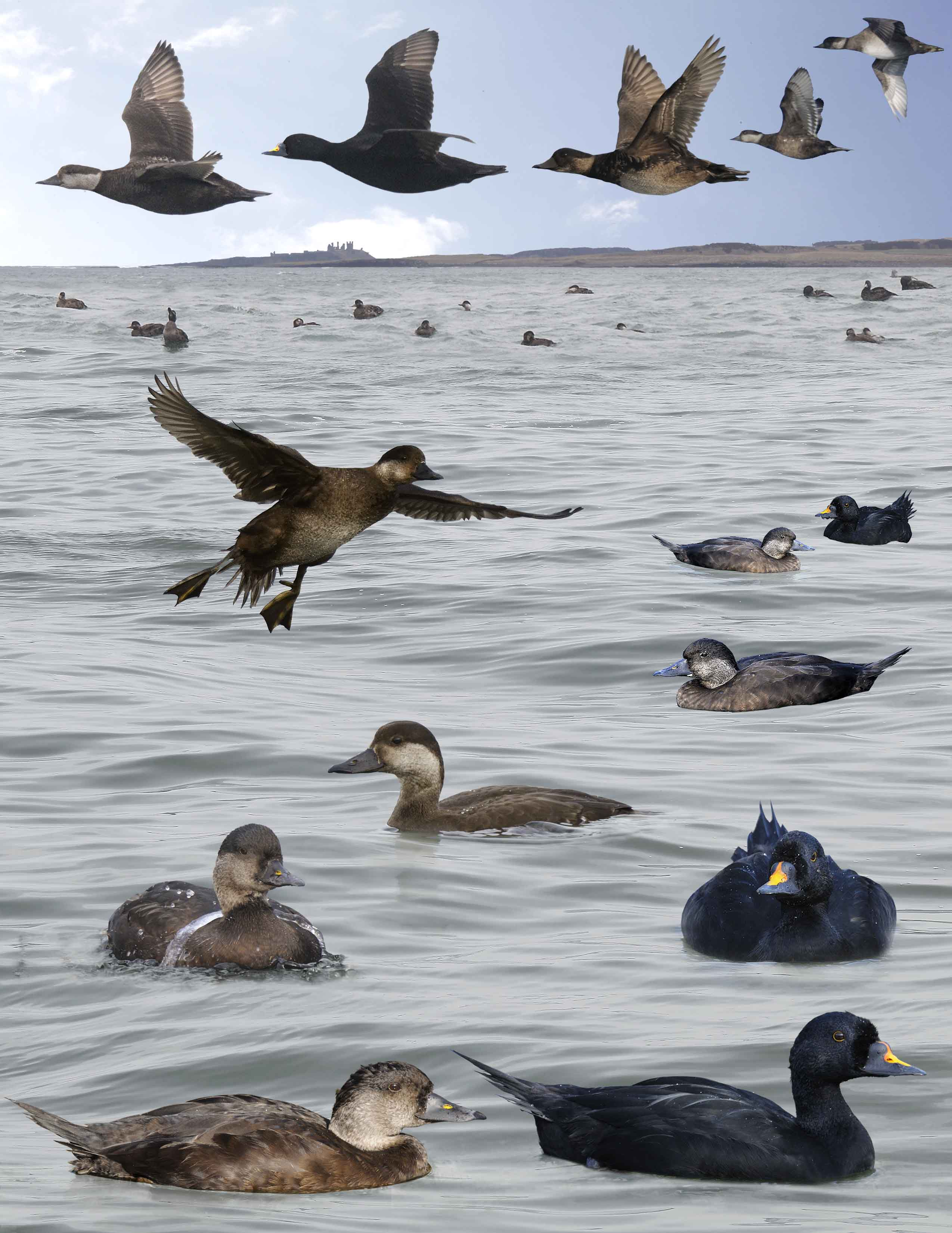
Composite image of common scoter

The common scoter is characterised by its bulky shape and large bill. The male is all black with a bulbous bill which shows some yellow coloration around the nostrils. The female is a brown bird with pale cheeks, very similar to female black scoter. This species can be distinguished from other scoters, apart from black scoter, by the lack of white anywhere on the drake and the more extensive pale areas on the female. The black scoter and common scoter have diagnosably distinct vocalisations.

== Behaviour and ecology ==
It winters farther south in temperate zones, on the coasts of Europe as far south as Morocco. It forms large flocks on suitable coastal waters. These are tightly packed, and the birds tend to take off and dive together.

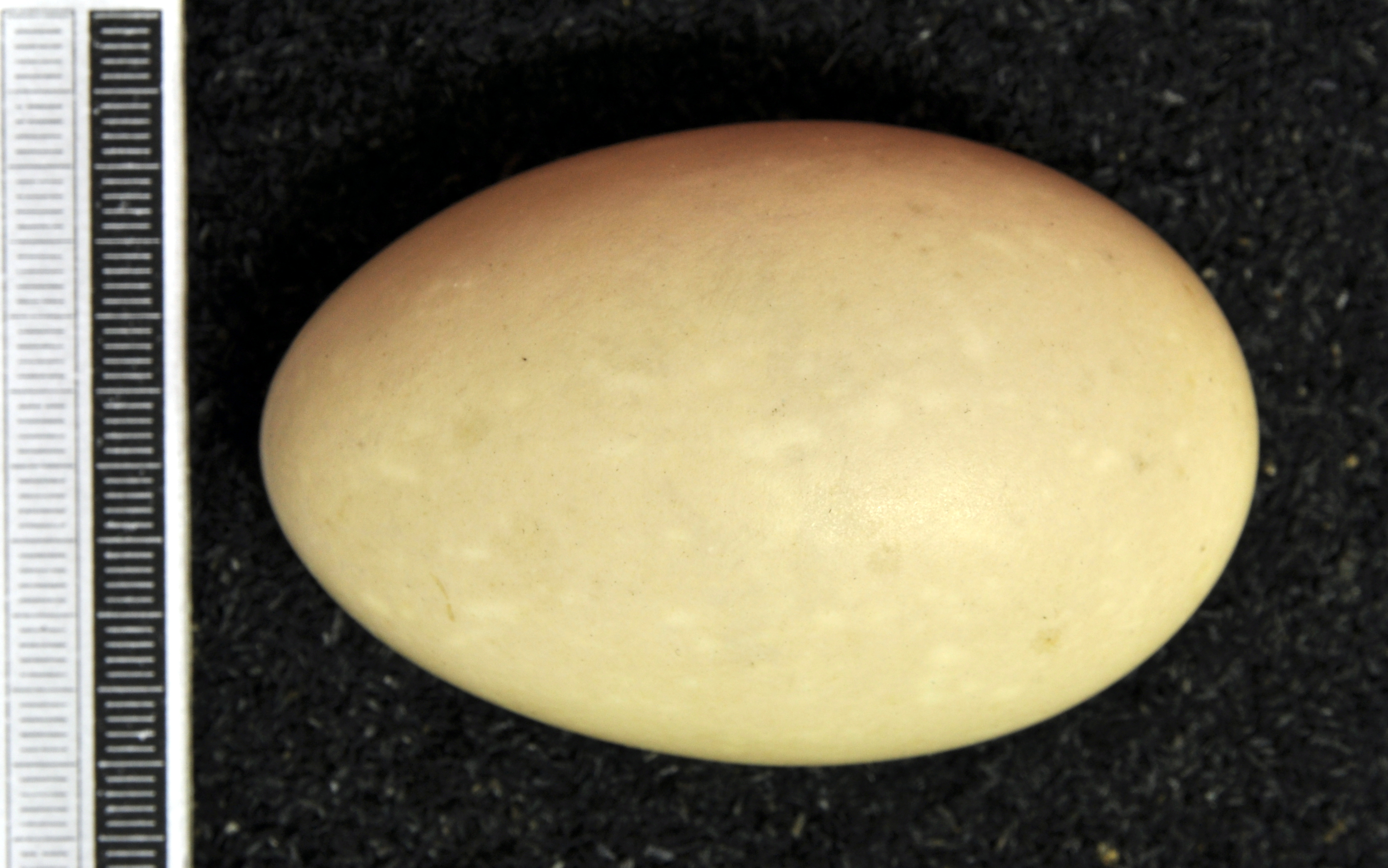
Egg, Collection Museum Wiesbaden

The lined nest is built on the ground close to the sea, lakes or rivers, in woodland or tundra. 6–8 eggs are laid.

This species dives for crustaceans and molluscs; it also eats aquatic insects and small fish when on fresh water.

The common scoter is one of the species to which the Agreement on the Conservation of African-Eurasian Migratory Waterbirds (AEWA) applies.

== UK population and current issues ==
In 1977, the ornithologist Bruce Campbell estimated the wintering population in north-western Europe to be about 130,000, mostly in the Baltic area, and the UK population at about 20,000. There is a marked passage in spring through the Straits of Dover.

In 2003, a previously unknown wintering population of 50,000+ was found on Shell Flat in the north west of England by Cirrus Energy whilst surveying the area for a new wind farm. Due to this development and an oil spill off the coast of Wales in 1996, questions about the common scoter population have been asked in the UK Parliament.

Although the common scoter is a winter visitor to the UK, there are some breeding pairs in the north of Scotland. The species has been placed on the RSPB conservation Red List because of a greater than 50% decline in the UK breeding population. In 1998, the UK Government agreed to a biodiversity action plan (BAP) for the common scoter to increase the breeding population to 100 pairs by 2008. The Northern Irish population, which had reached a peak of 150–200 pairs in the 1970s, crashed disastrously in the 1990s and by 2010 there were no confirmed reports of breeding. However, 100 pairs were recorded in the south of Ireland in a 1995 survey. UK breeding pairs have declined to 35 as of 2015 and attempts are being made to research why.

At the third steering group meeting of the UK Common Scoter Biodiversity Action Plan (BAP), the population in the Shell Flat area was put at 16,500 wintering scoter and 5,000 moulting birds, of which 4,000 used the footprint area of the proposed wind farm.

== Scoters and meatless Fridays in France ==
In parts of France, in the nineteenth century and earlier, the common scoter was accepted by the Roman Catholic Church as a substitute for fish during the Friday fast.

The scoters are said to appear on the coasts of France in great numbers, to which they are attracted by a certain kind of small bivalve shell fish called vaimeaux ... At the flowing of the tide the scoters approach in great numbers, diving after their favourite food, and soon get entangled in the nets. ... These are sold to the Roman Catholics, who eat them on those days on which they are forbidden by their religion the use of animal food, fish excepted; these birds and a few others of the same fishy flavour, having been exempted from the interdict ...
