= PlugShare =

Mobile and web application

- PlugShare logo
- Developers: Recargo, Inc.; EVgo Inc.
- Release: 2009; 17 years ago
- Operating system: Android; iOS
- Platform: Mobile app; Web application
- Available in: 29 languages
- Website: plugshare.com

PlugShare is a mobile and web application which provides information on the location and details of charging stations for electric automobiles. The application was developed and continues to be maintained by Recargo, Inc. – which has been a part of EVgo Inc. since mid-2021.

== About ==
PlugShare was introduced in 2009, the same year its developer, Recargo, Inc., was founded.

The application and its developer, Recargo, Inc., were acquired by Innogy in October 2018. They were then acquired by EVgo Inc. in July 2021 for US$25 million.

The number of charging stations available via the application grew by 50% from June 2021 to June 2022 to approximately 600,000 stations. By this time, the application had 2.5 million registered users who had collectively checked in on the application over 5 million times.

== Overview ==
PlugShare utilizes the user's location or a provided address to show a map or list charging stations for electric automobiles. The application provides basic information on the station's specifications and fees. It also provides information on amenities nearby the station, such as hotels, parks, restaurants, or retail.

The application utilizes the databases of numerous electric vehicle charging networks as well user submissions - including home chargers available for public usage.

As of August 2023, PlugShare is available in 29 languages. It is available for free, but users may pay to upgrade and avoid seeing advertisements within the application. The application is available on its website and as a mobile application on iOS and Android.

Users may register to check into charging stations, track which stations they have used, and enter information about their electric vehicle to help filter results to show stations compatible with the user's vehicle. Registered users may also submit new stations, update information on existing stations, add notes for other drivers, and add photographs.

PlugShare also facilitates payment for fees at the charging stations of certain electric vehicle charging networks.

== See also ==
- Charging station
- Electric vehicle charging network
