= Dogger Bank Wind Farm =

Wind farm cluster off the coast of England

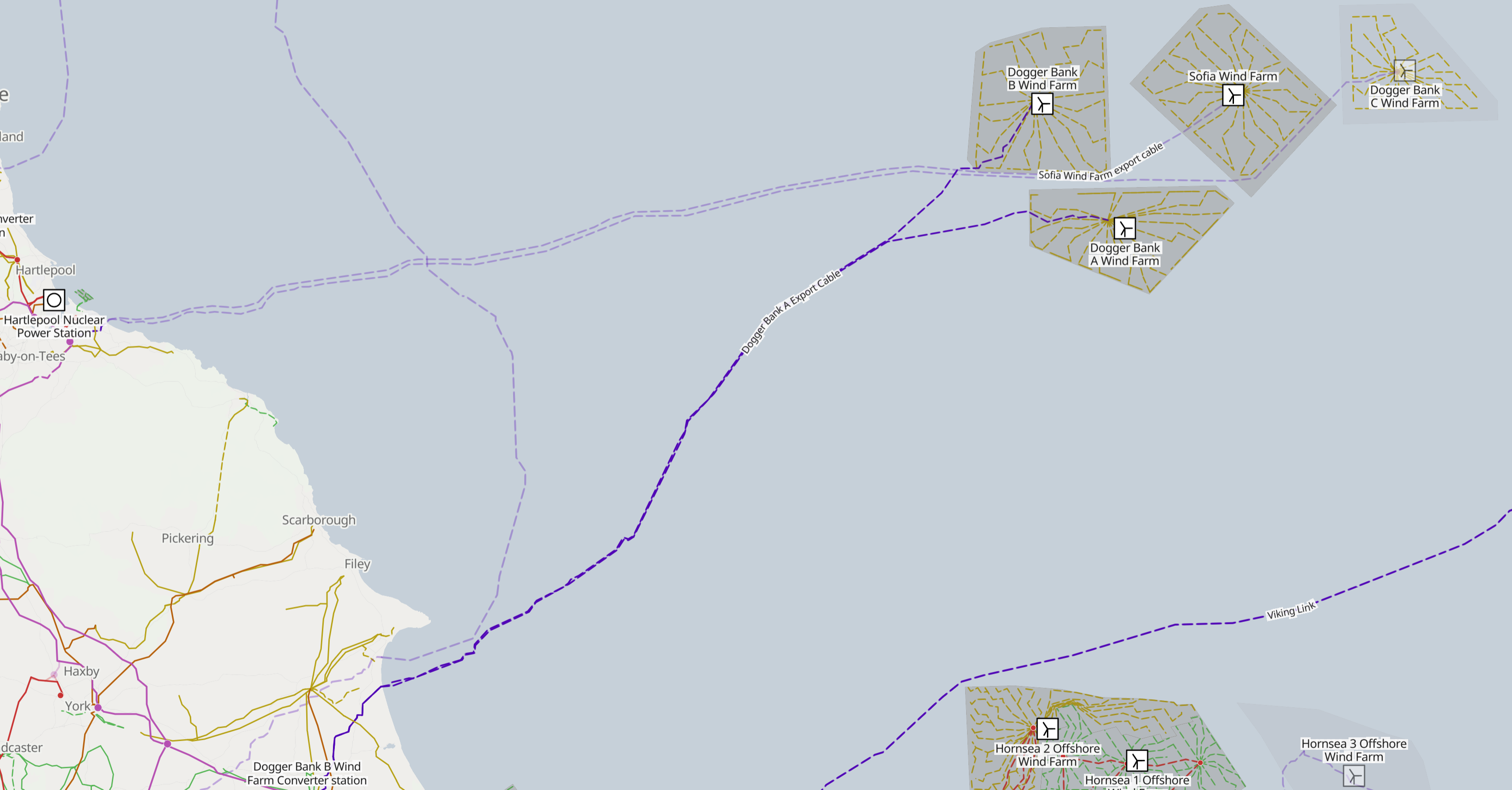
- Country: England
- Location: Dogger Bank
- Coordinates: 54°45′N 1°55′E
- Status: Under construction
- Owner: multiple

Wind farm
- Type: Offshore
- Distance from shore: 125 km (78 mi)

Power generation
- Make and model: GE Haliade-X 13 MW (A and B); GE Haliade-X 14.7 MW (C); Siemens Gamesa 14-222 DD (Sofia)
- Units planned: 95 × 13 MW (A); 95 × 13 MW (B); 87 × 14.7 MW (C); 100 × 14 MW (Sofia)
- Nameplate capacity: 1235 MW (A); 1235 MW (B); 1218 MW (C); 1400 MW (Sofia); 3000 MW (South)

External links
- Website: doggerbank.com

Dogger Bank Wind Farm is a group of offshore wind farms under construction 130 to 200 kilometres (81 to 124 mi) off the east coast of Yorkshire, England in the North Sea. It is considered to be the world's largest offshore windfarm. As of 2024, a total of 8.1 GW generating capacity is expected to be installed on Dogger Bank.

Since 2017 Creyke Beck A and B and Teesside A are developed by Dogger Bank Wind Farm Limited as Dogger Bank A, B and C, while Teesside B is developed by Sofia Offshore Wind Farm Limited as Sofia Offshore Wind Farm. All four farms were successful in the 2019 contract for difference auction and have a delivery date between 2023 and 2025.

On 10 October 2023, Dogger Bank wind farm started producing electricity for the first time.

== Project overview ==
Dogger Bank is in the North Sea, located between 130 and 200 kilometres (81 and 124 mi) off the east coast of Yorkshire. It is one of nine offshore zones belonging to the Crown Estate which formed part of the third licence round for UK offshore wind farms.

The Dogger Bank is an attractive location for offshore wind farms because it is far away from shore, avoiding complaints about the visual impact of wind turbines, yet the water depth is shallow enough for traditional fixed foundation wind turbine designs. Fixed-foundation wind turbines are economically limited to maximum water depths of 40 to 50 metres (130 to 160 ft), at greater water depths new floating wind turbine designs are required, which currently cost significantly more to build.

The Forewind consortium was formed by the four owner companies – SSE, RWE, Statoil and Statkraft – in November 2008 in response to the third licence round. In January 2010, Forewind was announced as the developer for the Dogger Bank Zone, the largest of the Round 3 zones. Statoil increases its share from Statkraft, beginning in 2017. In August 2017 new ownership arrangements were announced, SSE and Equinor (formerly Statoil) have each taken 50% share in Dogger Bank Creyke Beck A, B and Teesside A, while Innogy (RWE subsidiary) has taken Teesside B and renamed it to Sofia Offshore Wind Farm.

The Forewind Consortium originally planned to produce up to 9 GW of power, their plans were scaled down to 7.2 GW in 2014, and scaled down even further to 4.8 GW in 2015. Some of the steel used is from Port Talbot Steelworks.

In 2022 it was announced that the Dogger Bank A, B and C wind farms would be expanded to add an additional wind farm Dogger Bank D. Additionally the Crown Estate leased out a 1.3 GW zone named Dogger Bank South.

At the COP28 summit on 1 December 2023, it was agreed that energy firms RWE and Masdar would significantly fund the Dogger Bank wind farm projects through an £11 billion investment.

As of 2026, Dogger Bank A, B and C together with Sofia are expected to produce 5 GW of power. An additional 3 GW is under development at the two Dogger Bank South projects, a combined total of 8 GW.

== Final design and construction ==
As of November 2022, there are four zones in the Dogger Bank Wind Farm project that are either in the pre-construction or full construction phase. They are Dogger Bank A, B and C as well as Sofia.

=== Dogger Bank A and B ===
The first phase was called Dogger Bank Creyke Beck A and B. The original plan called for two offshore wind farms each generating up to 1.2 GW of electricity, with a total installed capacity of up to 2.4 GW. They would connect to the existing Creyke Beck substation near Cottingham, in the East Riding of Yorkshire. The two sites lie 131 kilometres (81 mi) from the East Yorkshire coast. Dogger Bank Creyke Beck A will cover an area of 515 square kilometres (199 sq mi) and Dogger Bank Creyke Beck B will cover an area of 599 square kilometres (231 sq mi). Planning consent was granted for up to 400 turbines on 17 February 2015. These two projects were owned by SSE and Equinor, in December 2020 Eni acquired 20% stake. ABB was chosen for the HVDC power transfer cables to shore.

On 21 September 2020, it was announced that Dogger Bank A and B will use 190 GE Haliade-X 13 MW offshore wind turbines over both sites, meaning that 95 turbines will be used on each site. The availability of upgraded Haliade-X turbines rated at 13 MW rather than 12 MW means that each site will be capable of generating up to 1.235 GW, for a total of 2.47 GW. Turbines will be pre-assembled at Able Seaton Port in Hartlepool, an activity that will lead to the creation of 120 skilled jobs at the port during construction. Turbine installation commenced in August 2023 at Dogger Bank A. Power Purchase Agreements for 15 years were signed in November 2020. Offshore cable laying started in April 2022. Installation of the turbine foundations was started in July 2022.

In April 2023, SSE announced that the world's first unmanned High Voltage Direct Current (HVDC) substation had been installed at Dogger Bank A, with similar infrastructure to be completed for Dogger Bank B and C.

A 107m long wind turbine blade failed during commissioning of the Dogger Bank A wind farm.

Dogger Bank A wind farm was expected to be complete in the second half of 2025. On 16 February 2026, SSE reported in its "Weekly Notice of Operations – Rev 206" that all 95 turbines had been installed.

Dogger Bank B wind farm is expected to be complete in 2027. As of 27 July 2026, SSE reported in its "Weekly Notice of Operations – Rev 173" that 33 out of 95 turbines had been installed.

=== Dogger Bank C ===
Dogger Bank C (formerly "Dogger Bank Teesside A") will use GE Haliade 14 MW turbines. Installation of the turbines is set to begin in 2025 with completion of the overall project in 2026. Similar to Dogger Bank A and B, a 15-year Power Purchase Agreement was agreed in November 2021. All output (estimated at 18 TWh/year) from A, B and C were thus in contract, a stepping stone towards financing.

As a first for UK offshore wind, Dogger Bank C onshore converter station was a winner of an auction to provide the affordable options for reactive power to stabilize the grid and reduce grid cost. The converter will provide up to 200 megavolt amperes with a price of 0.34 £/MVAr/SP from April 2025 and ten years on.

As of 27 July 2026, Dogger Bank Windfarm Ltd. reported in its "Weekly Notice of Operations – Rev 096" that all 87 foundation and transition pieces and 58 out of 87 inter array cables were installed.

=== Sofia ===
Sofia (formerly "Dogger Bank Teesside B") will use 100 Siemens Gamesa 14 MW turbines. Offshore construction was set to begin in 2023 with completion of the overall project in 2026. 44 turbines use recyclable blades made in Hull.

As of 22 June 2026, RWE Renewable UK Wind Service Ltd. reported in its "Weekly Notice of Operations no 025 of 2026" that all foundations, wind turbine generators and inter array cables were installed.

On 16 August 2026, the Sofia Windfarm started generating electricity.

=== Dogger Bank South ===
RWE is moving forward with two new offshore wind farms in the Dogger Bank area, Dogger Bank South West and Dogger Bank South East. Each will have a capacity of 1.5 GW generation. Following the Round 4 leasing process, RWE obtained approval from the UK Secretary of State for Business, Energy and Industrial Strategy (BEIS) to enter into an Agreement for Lease with The Crown Estate in summer 2022. In December 2023, RWE and UAE firm Masdar signed an agreement to develop a 3GW windfarm at Dogger Bank South. In January 2026, RWE and Masdar won a CfD auction for 3 GW to be delivered in 2030/2031 (first phase). Planning permission was received in May 2026.

== Potential additional zones ==
=== Dogger Bank D ===
SSE Renewables and Equinor are investigating the potential deployment of an additional 1.5 GW of turbines in the Eastern portion of the original Dogger Bank C area and launched a consultation during June 2026. This additional phase is known as Dogger Bank D. The grid has the capability to support up to 1320 MW.

== Initial plans ==
This section provides the historical context for the development of the Dogger Bank Wind Farm and the various name and design changes that have occurred since it was first proposed.

Dogger Bank Teesside were intended to be the second and third stage of development of the Dogger Bank Zone. It was divided into two phases of development: Dogger Bank Teesside A and B and Dogger Bank Teesside C and D. These would connect to the National Grid at a substation in Redcar and Cleveland, Teesside.

=== Dogger Bank Teesside A and B (Dogger Bank C and Sofia Offshore Wind Farm) ===
Dogger Bank Teesside A & B comprised two wind farms, each generating up to 1.2 GW of electricity. Dogger Bank Teesside A lies 196 kilometres (122 mi) from the shore and will cover an area of 560 square kilometres (220 sq mi). Dogger Bank Teesside B lies 165 kilometres (103 mi) from the shore and will cover an area of 593 square kilometres (229 sq mi). Planning consent was granted for 400 turbines on 5 August 2015. Since 2017, SSE and Equinor own Dogger Bank Teesside A (renamed to Dogger Bank C), while Dogger Bank Teesside B was taken by Innogy and renamed to Sofia Offshore Wind Farm.

=== Dogger Bank Teesside C and D ===
This second application (C and D) was planned to comprise two wind farms, each generating up to 1.2 GW of electricity. It was originally expected that planning consent would be determined in 2017. However, in August 2015 Forewind scrapped the final phase and returned the remaining area of the Dogger Bank development zone to the Crown Estate.

== North Sea Wind Power Hub ==
Dutch, German and Danish electrical grid operators are cooperating in a project to build a North Sea Wind Power Hub complex on one or more artificial islands to be constructed on Dogger Bank as part of a European system for sustainable electricity. The power hub would interconnect the three national power grids with each other and with the Dogger Bank Wind Farm.

A study commissioned by Dutch electrical grid operator TenneT reported in February 2017 that as much as 110 gigawatts of wind energy generating capacity could ultimately be developed at the Dogger Bank location.

At the North Seas Energy Forum in Brussels on 23 March 2017, Energinet will sign a contract to work with the German and Dutch branches of TenneT; thereafter a feasibility study will be produced.

As of 2026, it is still unsure as to whether Dogger Bank will become a part of the North Sea Wind Power Hub, with little development having been made since 2017.

== Battery storage ==
Adjacent to Creyke Beck substation for the wind farm, near Cottingham in the East Riding of Yorkshire, the Pillswood 196 MWh battery storage power station was installed in 2022 using Tesla Megapack LFP batteries, capable of producing 98 MW for 2 hours.
