= Oxxio =

Utility company in the Netherlands

- Company type: Subsidiary
- Industry: Electricity
- Headquarters: Rotterdam, Netherlands
- Products: Electric power Natural gas Internet; Television
- Parent: Eneco Energie

Oxxio is an electricity, natural gas, internet and television utility located in Rotterdam, Netherlands. It is a subsidiary of Eneco Energie.

Oxxio serves about 800,000 customers in the Netherlands. It is the fourth largest supplier and the largest of the companies that entered the market since the energy market liberalisation in 2000.

In 2005, Centrica acquired Oxxio. In March 2011, Oxxio was acquired by Eneco Energie for €72 million.
