= Celtic Array =

- Country: United Kingdom
- Location: Irish Sea
- Coordinates: 53.771°N 4.411°W
- Status: Cancelled
- Owners: Centrica, DONG Energy

Wind farm
- Type: Offshore

The Celtic Array was a proposed UK round 3 offshore wind farm in the Irish Sea south east of the Isle of Man.

The wind farm zone was awarded to Centrica for development in 2012, and in 2012 Centrica formed a joint venture with DONG Energy to develop the zone; a "zone appraisal report" published in 2012 split the area into 3 development zones, with large scale gaps between, primarily to prevent disruption to shipping; the three development zones were estimated to have a total capacity of between 2.9 and 5.4 GW. In 2012 a planning application for the southeastern zone was submitted, as the Rhiannon Wind Farm, with an estimated capacity of 2.2 GW.

In July 2014 the developers terminated plans for the wind farm due to unviable turbine foundation costs.

== History and development ==
In late 2007 the UK Department for Business, Enterprise and Regulatory Reform instigated studies to identify offshore wind sites for around 25 GW of generating capacity; the study, the Offshore Energy Strategic Environmental Assessment (OESEA1, 2009) identified up to 33 GW of potential offshore wind power within English and Welsh territorial waters at sea bed depth of less than 60 m (200 ft); In June 2008 the "Round 3" phase of UK offshore development was announced, subsequently the OESEA plan was adopted, and the Crown Estate designated several areas of potential development, and began a competitive tender process to allocate the sites to developers. Zone development agreements were made in December 2009.

In January 2010 Centrica was awarded the license to develop the Irish Sea round 3 zone; the zone had a total area of 2,200 km^{2} (850 sq mi) with an estimated potential of 4.2 GW through wind power generation. In March 2012 Centrica and DONG Energy formed a joint venture to develop the wind farm zone, acquiring 50% of Centrica Energy Renewable Investments Ltd., the Irish Sea wind farm development subsidiary, at a cost of £40 million.

The site was split into three zones: a north-east zone of 359 km^{2} (139 sq mi) with 1 to 2 GW estimated capacity; a south-west zone of 255 km^{2} (98 sq mi) with 0.5 to 0.8 GW; and a south-eastern zone of 617 km^{2} (238 sq mi) with 1.4 to 2.6 GW.

The sea bed of the wind farm zone consisted of sand/gravel, or glacial material including sand/gravel and boulders in Diamicton (mud/sand); below the sea bed surface strata include boulder clays and tills. Bedrock was located at between sea bed level and 100m below sea bed, with deeper levels at the west of the zone.

Significant shipping routes crossed the wind farm zone at several points, including: Liverpool to Belfast shipping crosses the zone roughly between the south-eastern and north-eastern development areas; shipping mainly tankers to the Mersey ports via the pilot station at Point Lynas cross the zone roughly between the southwestern and southeastern development zones; additional Liverpool to Dublin shipping skirted close to the southern edge of the zone, as well as crossing the southeastern zone. To reduce collision risk an additional shipping buffer zone was recommended at the southern and southwestern edges of the southeastern development zone (Rhiannon). Considerations of the main shipping routes were a major factor in forming shapes of the development zones.

The south-east zone was the first to be taken forward, with a planning scoping report submitted to the Infrastructure Planning Commission in 2012 as the Rhiannon Wind Farm. In late 2012 the wind farm plan application for the northeast block was delayed based on concerns on its impact on shipping to the Isle of Man (such as that affecting the Isle of Man Steam Packet Company).

In July 2014 plans for the wind farm were terminated by Centrica and Dong, due to the foundation requirements being beyond what was currently financially viable. One factor was the differing ground conditions (sand/rock) which would have required different foundation types, increasing costs.

=== Rhiannon wind farm ===
53.675°N 4.238°W

An initial scoping report was submitted in 2012; the proposed wind farm was on a site ~19 km from Anglesey, ~34 km from the Isle of Man and ~60 km from Cumbria, with a capacity of up to 2.2 GW; initial planning assumed a National grid connection at Anglesey. The initial scoping report supposed wind turbines with between 5 MW and 15 MW capacity.

The wind farm site had a maximum area of 497 km^{2} (192 sq mi) with water depths of 36 to 83 m (118 to 272 ft) with a tidal range of up to 8.5m.

Public consultation began in late 2012, the second consultation phase began in March 2014.

By the stage 2 consultation (March 2014) the wind farm power export cables, landfall and national grid connection had been narrowed from 16 export cables with potential landfall and grid connection sites along the west English and north Welsh coasts, to 12 export cables making landfall at 4 sites in North Anglesey connected by an underground cable to a substation at Rhosgoch. The National Grid expects to construct a 400 kV substation adjacent to the onshore Celtic Array wind farm substation, and to make the connection to the mainland electrical gridon the Wylfa Pentir overhead line. The wind farm at stage 2 was expected to consist of between 146 and 440 (15 MW to 4 MW) wind turbines, with up to 8 HVAC offshore substations plus potentially up to 4 HVDC offshore substations; the use of HVDC was not a preferred option. The wind farm would potentially have had up to 4 offshore accommodation platforms for servicing.
