= Navitus Bay wind farm =

Navitus Bay offshore wind farm
- Official name: Navitus Bay Wind Park
- Country: United Kingdom
- Location: ~10 km south of Dorset and the Isle of Wight
- Coordinates: 50°34′33″N 1°42′47″W
- Status: Planning refused
- Owners: Eneco Wind UK Ltd (Eneco), EDF Energy

Wind farm
- Type: Offshore
- Max. water depth: 32 to 53 m (105 to 174 ft)
- Distance from shore: 14.3 km (8.9 mi)
- Site area: 155 km^{2} (60 sq mi)

Power generation
- Units planned: 78–121
- Nameplate capacity: 624–968 MW

External links
- Website: navitusbaywindpark.co.uk (Archived)

Navitus Bay Wind Park was a proposed 970 MW Round 3 offshore wind farm, to be situated off the English coast approximately 10 km south of Dorset and the Isle of Wight. The wind farm was refused planning permission in September 2015.

== History and development ==
Eneco Energie was awarded seabed land rights to develop a Round 3 offshore wind farm by The Crown Estate in 2010. Initial estimates were that around 30% of the 723 km^{2} (279 sq mi) zone could be used for wind farm development, giving a capacity of ~900 MW. An initial "Zone Appraisal and Planning" (ZAP) report was published in December 2010. The report proposed a single 77 square miles (200 km^{2}) wind farm located in the middle northern part of the development zone, over 8 miles from both Durlston Head (Isle of Purbeck), and The Needles (Isle of Wight), with water depths of 28 to 55 metres (92 to 180 ft). In 2011 the name "Navitus Bay" was chosen by a public poll conducted by Eneco. Eneco (Eneco Wind UK Ltd) and EDF Energy formed a 50:50 joint venture in 2012 to develop the project.

By mid-2012 a cable landfall location had been selected at Taddiford Gap between Barton on Sea and Milford on Sea; with an underground onshore cable route of approximately 35 kilometres (22 mi) connecting to a new substation at Mannington, where a connection at 400 kV to the existing National Grid would be made. (agreed with National Grid October 2011.)

In December 2012, after public consultation, the wind farm was reduced in size from 76.4 to 67.5 square miles (198 to 175 km^{2}) to reduce visual impact from coastal areas, with the maximum number of turbines cut from 333 to 218, and the maximum turbine height reduced from 210 to 200 metres (690 to 660 ft). The reduced wind farm had an estimated maximum capacity of around 1100 MW. Design expectations were for turbines of 5 to 8 MW capacity, foundation design was not finalised, but monopile foundations had been excluded from use in the southern half of the site. The offshore development would also include up to three (33 or 66 kV to 132 or 275 kV AC) offshore substations, and a meteorological mast.

In late 2013, Robert Syms (MP for Poole) argued against the project in parliament, citing concerns including impact on the tourism industry; the wind farm was also opposed by group "Challenge Navitus" on the basis that it was too large and inappropriately placed, as well concerns about a potential negative environmental impact. In February 2014, the area was further reduced in scope, to mitigate visual impact to the northeast, with the area reduced to 60 mi^{2} (160 km^{2}), resulting in 24 fewer estimated turbines, resulting in a reduced maximum capacity of 970 MW.

In May 2014, the application to the Planning Inspectorate was formally accepted. An altered and reduced 630 MW alternative proposal was produced in November 2014.

In May 2015, the developers announced that their preferred plan was to use 121 8MW turbines generating a maximum of 968 MW. They also stated that the alternative plan would have a maximum of 78 turbines (generating up to 624 MW). MHI Vestas was awarded preferred supplier status for the development, with V164-8MW machines being selected. If it had been approved, construction (of a 900 MW scheme) was expected to take 3 to 4.5 years, split into two or three phases.

In September 2015 planning permission for the wind farm was refused by the Planning Inspectorate, due to the visual impact effect the development would have had on the region – a tourist area which included a World Heritage Site (Jurassic Coast).
