= Forewind =

Coordinates: 54°44′N 2°43′E

Forewind Limited (Forewind) is a consortium comprising four leading international energy companies SSE, RWE, Equinor and Statkraft - which joined forces to bid for a Zone Development Agreement as part of The Crown Estate’s third licence round for UK offshore wind farms (Round 3).

On 8 January 2010, following a competitive tender process, The Crown Estate announced that Forewind had been awarded development rights for the largest zone: Dogger Bank. The Dogger Bank zone is 8660 km^{2} and is located in the North Sea off the Yorkshire coast, between 125 and 290 kilometres offshore.

Originally projected to produce up to 9 gigawatts of power, the plan was scaled down to 7.2 gigawatts in 2014, and scaled down even further to 4.8 gigawatts in 2015. The zone has a potential for up to 13GW. This figure is equivalent to almost 10 percent of the UK's projected electricity requirements.

Planning consent for the first phase of the project (Dogger Bank Creyke Beck) was granted by the UK government in February 2015, and consent for the second phase (Dogger Bank Teesside) was granted in August 2015.
