= Eneco =

Utility company in the Netherlands

Coordinates: 51°54′20.0″N 4°29′10″E

- Type: Public (Naamloze Vennootschap)
- Industry: Electricity
- Founded: 1995
- Headquarters: Rotterdam, Netherlands
- Key people: As Tempelman (CEO)
- Products: Electric power Natural gas
- Services: Heating; Waste management and processing
- Revenue: €5,300 million (2012)
- Net income: €233 million (2012)
- Number of employees: 2,775 (2019)
- Parent: Mitsubishi Corporation (80%); Chubu Electric Power (20 %)
- Subsidiaries: Oxxio
- Website: www.eneco.nl

Eneco, the trading name of Eneco Groep N.V., is a producer and supplier of natural gas, electricity and heat in the Netherlands, serving more than 2 million business and residential customers. The company's headquarters are located in Rotterdam. It also carries out energy trading and is involved in sustainable energy projects. Eneco is the largest power company in South Holland.

== Overview ==
The company is divided into five business units:

- Eneco New Energy – responsible for sustainable generation and sustainable energy projects
- Eneco Energy Trade – responsible for trade in energy and biomass
- Eneco Netherlands – the main company, supplying gas and electricity to the Netherlands
- Eneco Installation Companies – responsible for heating installations and the supply of energy to customers
- Eneco International – responsible for projects outside of the Netherlands

== History ==
Eneco was founded on January 1, 1995 under the name ENECO, as a merger of the municipal energy companies of The Hague, Dordrecht and Rotterdam. ENECO stands for "Energy and Communication". In July 2000, ENECO N.V. merged with six other regional energy companies as a result of the liberalization policy of the Dutch government. Because the cable activities were sold to UPC in the same year, the name was changed to ENECO Energie. In 2000, Eneco Energiebedrijf Midden-Holland took over EMH from Gouda and Gasdistributie Zeist en Omstreken (GZO). In 2003, Eneco acquired the Utrecht energy company REMU. This was made possible by the capital released by the sale of the cable activities to UPC, now Ziggo. ENECO Energie became the third-largest energy company in the Netherlands and a supplier in three of the four major cities.

In mid-2008, the company started to pay more attention to renewable energy. On 15 June 2009 it was announced that Eneco Holding had taken over parts of the bankrupt Econcern. Eneco Holding also bought parts of the companies Evelop with wind farms and part of the biomass activities, Ecostream for solar energy and Ecofys for advice in the field of sustainability. This added a sustainable package of activities in the Netherlands, Germany, Belgium, France and the United Kingdom to the company. Ecofys was placed in a separate (fourth) core company to guarantee independence in the consultancy work. 400 employees joined the takeover.

On 8 January 2010 the United Kingdom Crown Estate awarded Eneco New Energy the Zone 7 offshore wind farm licence for UK waters. This gave the company exclusive rights to create a 900 MW offshore wind farm (Navitus Bay) off the west coast of the Isle of Wight. The wind farm was refused planning permission in 2015 and was thus cancelled.

In March 2011, it was announced that Oxxio had been bought from the British Centrica for 72 million euros. As a result, Eneco's customer base grew by 426,000 to 2.1 million. Oxxio will continue to operate as an independent brand in the consumer market. Since August 2011, Eneco has also been active in Belgium on the private market for the supply of electricity and gas.

In February 2014, Eneco took over the Dutch sales office of DONG Energy, including its 90,000 customers.

In January 2017, Eneco took a 50% share interest in the German LichtBlick. The Hamburg-based company supplies green energy to 645,000 customers and also develops software in the energy field. LichtBlick does not have any production facilities of its own and supplies electricity from South German hydroelectric power stations. LichtBlick achieved a turnover of 670 million euros in 2015. The acquisition price has not been disclosed. At the end of 2018, the option was exercised to acquire the remaining shares of LichtBlick.

On 10 July 2017, Eneco took over the Belgian branch of Eni. The acquisition brought the company's total customer base to 1.1 million individuals. Eneco may use the Eni brand name for another year.

In December 2016, the company was awarded the Brussels 3 and 4 project, along with consortium partners Shell, Van Oord, and Mitsubishi/DGE. It was obtained for the lowest-ever strike price at the time (54.50 euro cents per megawatt-hour).

On February 21, 2018, Eneco and E.ON announced that Eneco, with 200,000 private customers, is taking over the sales office of E.ON. E.ON has been the owner of competitor Essent since September 2019.

The company was 100% owned by the local governments of the Netherlands. On 25 March 2020, Eneco Groep NV announced that it would be acquired by a joint venture, jointly owned by the Japanese companies Mitsubishi Corporation (80%) and Chubu Electric Power (20%). Eneco installed a new board of directors following the acquisition.
