= Atlantic Array =

Atlantic Array Offshore Wind Farm
- Country: England, United Kingdom
- Location: Bristol Channel, off North Devon and South Wales
- Coordinates: 51°16′19″N 3°39′43″W
- Status: Cancelled
- Owner: RWE Npower Renewables

Wind farm
- Type: Offshore
- Max. water depth: 25–60 m (80–200 ft)
- Distance from shore: 15.5 km (9.6 mi)
- Site area: 200 km^{2} (77 sq mi)

Power generation
- Units cancelled: up to 240
- Nameplate capacity: 1,200 MW

External links
- Website: www.rwe.com/web/cms/en/354738/rwe-innogy/sites/wind-offshore/developing-sites/atlantic-array-offshore-wind-farm/

Atlantic Array was a proposed offshore wind farm in the Bristol Channel, off the coast of North Devon and South Wales, United Kingdom. It was a development by RWE Npower Renewables. With a planned 1.2 gigawatt capacity, it would have been one of the world's largest offshore wind farms. The project was cancelled in November 2013.

== Proposals ==
A site within the UK's third round of offshore wind developments, it was to be located 9.6 miles (15 km) off the coast of north Devon, and around 13.5 miles (22 km) off the coast of South Wales, quite close to the island of Lundy. Originally proposed by Farm Energy, now part of RWE npower renewables, the company won the lease development rights from the Crown Estate (which owns the UK seabed).

The proposals included up to 240 wind turbines, which RWE npower said was enough to power up to 900,000 homes with renewable energy. The capacity was expected to be 1.2 gigawatts, so it would have been one of the world's largest offshore wind farms.

== Planning and cancellation ==
Originally proposed in 2007, the developers made a formal application on 14 June 2013 for a Development Consent Order under the 2008 Planning Act, which would have required a decision (by the Secretary of State for Energy and Climate Change) in autumn 2014. The developers announced the cancellation of the wind farm on 25 November 2013, citing technical and financial reasons.

The wealth of data and information that was gathered as part of the process of planning and assessing the impact of the wind farm is now available online for free using The Crown Estate's Marine Data Exchange.
