= Shell Flat =

Cirrus Shell Flat Array
- Country: England
- Location: Irish Sea, between Blackpool and Cleveleys
- Coordinates: 53°51′0″N 3°10′1″W
- Status: Cancelled
- Owners: Cirrus Energy (original developer); ScottishPower

Wind farm
- Distance from shore: 8 km (5 mi)

Power generation
- Units operational: 60
- Nameplate capacity: 180 MW

The Shell Flat Sandbank was the site of a proposed Cirrus Shell Flat Array offshore wind farm in Lancashire, England. It is located about 8 kilometres (5.0 mi) off the coast between Blackpool and Cleveleys. The wind farm project was canceled in 2008.

== History ==
The original application was submitted in 2003. The permission for the site studies was granted on 16 June 2004. The new application with changed location was submitted in 2007. The application for planning permission was withdrawn in 2008.

== Description ==
The Cirrus Shell Flat Array would contain 90 turbines rated at 180 MW. A later redesign of the scheme, by ScottishPower, for 284 MW, was withdrawn from the planning process in November 2008.

== Developers ==
The developer, Cirrus Energy, was a consortium made up of CeltPower Ltd (subsidiary of ScottishPower), Elsam A/S (now DONG Energy) and Shell Wind Energy Aegir Ltd. Shell's interest in the project has subsequently been reported sold to the project's partners, ScottishPower and DONG Energy. However, this was denied by Shell.

== Reasons for cancellation ==
The project was canceled due safety and environmental concerns. The application was withdrawn after the developers failed to reach an agreement with BAE Systems and the Ministry of Defence over concerns of an interference with their radar systems and a potential physical obstruction for low flying aircraft. There were concerns that the wind farm would interfere with BAE Systems test flying at Warton. Also potential risk to shipping was one of concerns.

Construction of the wind farm was objected by the Royal Society for the Protection of Birds. A large population of common scoters (sea duck) was found near the site. This cause the relocation of site in 2005 more close to Fleetwood. However, the new site was in addition to BAE Systems and the Ministry of Defence also objected by the Blackpool International Airport and local fishermen.
