= Innogy =

German company

innogy SE
- Company type: Societas Europaea (SE)
- Industry: Electricity
- Founded: 1 April 2016; 10 years ago
- Defunct: 2020
- Fate: Acquired by E.ON
- Headquarters: Essen, Germany
- Key people: Uwe Tigges (CEO)
- Revenue: €36.98 billion (2018)
- Owner: E.ON
- Number of employees: 42,904 (2018)
- Website: www.innogy.com (redirects to E.ON)

innogy SE was an energy company based in Essen, Germany. It is now merged and integrated into German energy company E.ON.

== History ==
The company was created on 1 April 2016, by splitting the renewable, network and retail businesses of RWE into a separate entity. The new entity combined RWE subsidiaries RWE innogy, RWE Deutschland, RWE Effizienz, RWE Vertrieb and RWE Energiedienstleistungen.

On 7 October 2016, it was listed at the Frankfurt Stock Exchange. They served 23 million customers in Europe. In November 2017, it was announced that innogy was looking to merge its energy retail subsidiary npower in the United Kingdom, with the equivalent division of rival SSE.

It was planned that innogy shareholders would own 34% of the demerged entity, however, the deal fell through, and in November 2019, it was announced that npower would ultimately be wound down following the acquisition of innogy by E.ON.

In March 2018, it was announced that E.ON would acquire innogy, in a complex deal of assets swap with RWE. The transfer of shares was completed in September 2019.

The innogy brand still prevails on the Czech market as the incumbent gas supplier to households and industrial consumers. The Czech subsidiary, originally part of RWE since 2003 has been divested during merger between innogy and eon in Germany in 2020. The owner of innogy Czech is MVM, the Hungarian energy corporation. This means that the global innogy brand aspiring for another "100 years" of history has shrunk to single central European market.

== eMobility ==
In December 2016, Innogy combined its electric vehicles related activities into a new subsidiary called innogy eMobility Solutions GmbH. It operates one of the largest charging points network in Europe, which includes 7,000 charging points in over twenty countries. Since September 2008, it operated in cooperation with Daimler AG test project in Berlin called e-mobility Berlin. It also cooperated with an Italian company called Be Charge.

In July 2018, the subsidiary in the United States, innogy eMobility US, announced the acquisition of California-based BTCPower, a manufacturer of DC fast chargers and AC Level 2 chargers. In October 2018, the acquisition of California-based Recargo, an electric mobility software company, was announced. Recargo produces the popular PlugShare platform that helps electric vehicle (EV) drivers find public charging stations.
